= Manitoba Provincial Road 205 =

Provincial road in Manitoba, Canada

Provincial Road 205
- PR 205 highlighted in red

Route information
- Maintained by Manitoba Infrastructure
- Length: 84.7 km (52.6 mi)
- Existed: 1966–present

Major junctions
- West end: PTH 3 / PR 336 in Sperling
- PTH 75 near Aubigny; PTH 59 in St. Pierre-Jolys
- East end: PTH 12 near Sarto

Location
- Country: Canada
- Province: Manitoba
- Rural municipalities: De Salaberry; Hanover; Morris
- Villages: St. Pierre-Jolys

Highway system
- Provincial highways in Manitoba; Winnipeg City Routes
← PR 204	→ PR 206

Provincial Road 205 (PR 205) is a 84.7-kilometre-long (52.6 mi) provincial road in the Canadian province of Manitoba. Spanning the Pembina Valley and Eastman regions in the south, it connects the communities of Sperling, Rosenort, Aubigny, St. Pierre-Jolys, and Grunthal with PTH 75 (Lord Selkirk Highway), while also spanning the Red River.

== Route description ==
PR 205 begins in the Rural Municipality of Morris at an intersection between PTH 3 (Boundary Commission Trail) and PR 336 in Sperling on the south side of town. The highway quickly leaves the town and heads due east as a gravel road for several kilometres, where it has a short concurrency with PR 332, before making a sharp turn to the south and crossing the Morris River twice. After a few kilometres, it curves due eastward again to enter Rosenort at an intersection with PR 422, where PR 205 becomes paved. PR 205 travels through some neighbourhoods as it crosses the Morris River for the final time, along with its spillway, before travelling through downtown along Main Street. Passing through another small neighbourhood, the highway leaves Rosenort and almost immediately passes through the small community of McTavish, where it junctions with PR 330. PR 205 crosses a railroad line and PTH 75 (Lord Selkirk Highway) before traversing a bridge over the Red River of the North to enter Aubigny, where it has an intersection with PR 246 (St. Mary's Road).

Leaving Aubigny, PR 205 heads east for a few more kilometres to enter the Rural Municipality of De Salaberry. Immediately it crosses the Marsh River just shortly before becoming concurrent with PR 200 and heading south. After only 1.7 kilometres (1.1 mi), PR 205 separates and heads east again to cross a railroad line at Carey and the Rat River to enter the village of St-Pierre-Jolys. The highway passes through neighbourhoods along Jolys Avenue W, crossing Joubert Creek before entering downtown and becoming concurrent with PTH 59 (Sabourin Street). The pair head south as a four-lane divided highway for a short distance to cross Joubert Creek once again before narrowing to two lanes and leaving the village.

PR 205 leaves PTH 59 and winds its way southeast to enter the Rural Municipality of Hanover and pass through downtown Grunthal along Main Street and Froese Road, while also being concurrent with PR 216. PR 205 continues east through rural farmland for the next several kilometres, travelling past the small community of Sarto before coming to and end at an intersection with PTH 12 (MOM's Way), with the road continuing east as Sarto Road.

With the exception of St-Pierre-Jolys, the entire length of PR 205 is a rural two-lane highway.

== Major intersections ==
Division	Location	km	mi	Destinations	Notes
Morris	Sperling	0.0	0.0	PTH 3 (Boundary Commission Trail) – Carman, Winnipeg; PR 336 south / Road 11W – Sperling, Kane	Western terminus of PR 205; northern terminus of PR 336; western end of unpaved section
Morris		8.2	5.1	PR 332 south – Lowe Farm	Western end of PR 332 concurrency (overlap)
Morris		9.8	6.1	PR 332 north – Brunkild	Eastern end of PR 332 concurrency
Morris		15.1	9.4	Bridge over the Morris River	
Morris		17.8	11.1	Bridge over the Morris River	
Morris	Rosenort	22.7	14.1	PR 422 south (Meridian Road)	Northern terminus of PR 422; eastern end of unpaved section
Morris	Rosenort	24.2	15.0	Bridge over the Morris River	
Morris	McTavish	29.3	18.2	PR 330 – Osborne, Morris	
Morris		35.8	22.2	PTH 75 (Lord Selkirk Highway) – Winnipeg, Morris	
Morris		36.6– 36.9	22.7– 22.9	Bridge over the Red River	
Morris	Aubigny	38.2	23.7	PR 246 (St. Mary's Road) – Morris, St. Adolphe	
De Salaberry		43.8	27.2	Bridge over the Marsh River	
De Salaberry		44.0	27.3	PR 200 north – St. Adolphe	Western end of PR 200 concurrency
De Salaberry		45.7	28.4	PR 200 south – Dominion City	Eastern end of PR 200 concurrency
De Salaberry		56.8	35.3	Bridge over the Rat River	
City of St-Pierre-Jolys		58.6	36.4	Bridge over Joubert Creek	
City of St-Pierre-Jolys		58.9	36.6	PTH 59 north – Winnipeg	Western end of PTH 59 concurrency
City of St-Pierre-Jolys		59.2	36.8	Bridge over Joubert Creek	
De Salaberry		60.1	37.3	PTH 59 south – St. Malo	Eastern end of PTH 59 concurrency
De Salaberry		64.2	39.9	Bridge over Joubert Creek	
Hanover		68.4	42.5	PR 216 north – Kleefeld	Western end of PR 216 concurrency
Hanover	Grunthal	73.2	45.5	PR 216 south – Rosa	Eastern end of PR 216 concurrency
Hanover		84.7	52.6	PTH 12 (MOM's Way) – Steinbach, Warroad	Eastern terminus; road continues east as Sarto Road
1.000 mi = 1.609 km; 1.000 km = 0.621 mi: Concurrency terminus
