= Manitoba Provincial Road 216 =

Provincial road in Manitoba, Canada

Provincial Road 216
- PR 200 highlighted in red

Route information
- Maintained by Manitoba Infrastructure
- Length: 40.9 km (25.4 mi)
- Existed: 1966–present

Major junctions
- North end: PR 311 near New Bothwell
- PTH 52 near Kleefeld
- South end: PTH 59 near Rosa

Location
- Country: Canada
- Province: Manitoba
- Rural municipalities: De Salaberry; Emerson – Franklin; Hanover

Highway system
- Provincial highways in Manitoba; Winnipeg City Routes
← PR 215	→ PR 217

Provincial Road 216 (PR 216) is a provincial road in the Canadian province of Manitoba. The north-south road lies mostly within the Rural Municipality of Hanover, beginning at PR 311 near New Bothwell and ending at PTH 59 near Rosa. PR 216 has a one-kilometre concurrency with PTH 52, between New Bothwell and Kleefeld, and a five-kilometre concurrency with Provincial Road 205 through Grunthal.

PR 216 forms the Main Streets for the communities of New Bothwell, Kleefeld, and Grunthal.

== Route description ==
PR 216 begins in the Rural Municipality of Emerson-Franklin at a junction with PTH 59 just northwest of the community of Rosa. The highway immediately enters into the Rural Municipality of De Salaberry, crossing the Rat River and passing through a mix of rural farmland and wooded areas for the next several kilometres, where it has an intersection with PR 403. It now crosses into the Rural Municipality of Hanover, entering the town of Grunthal at a junction with PR 205, with which it becomes concurrent with. The two overlapped highways head north through neighbourhoods along Froese Road before making a sharp left and going through downtown along Main Street. The pair then leave downtown and curve northward again, leaving Grunthal before PR 205 splits off and heads west.

PR 216 continues north to pass by Hochstadt shortly before travelling straight through the centre of Kleefeld along Main Street. Shortly thereafter, it has a short concurrency with PTH 52 before passing through the town of New Bothwell along Main Street and coming to an end at a junction with PR 311.

The entire length of Provincial Road 216 is a rural, paved, two-lane highway.

== Major intersections ==
Division	Location	km	mi	Destinations	Notes
Emerson-Franklin		0.0	0.0	PTH 59 – Tolstoi, St. Malo	Southern terminus; road continues south as Road 27E
De Salaberry		1.1	0.68	Bridge over the Rat River	
De Salaberry		7.0	4.3	PR 403 – St. Malo, Pansy	
Hanover	Grunthal	15.2	9.4	PR 205 east – Sarto	Southern end of PR 205 concurrency (overlap)
Hanover		20.0	12.4	PR 205 west – St-Pierre-Jolys	Northern end of PR 205 concurrency
Hanover		31.5	19.6	PTH 52 east – Steinbach	Southern end of PTH 52 concurrency
Hanover		32.7	20.3	PTH 52 west – St-Pierre-Jolys	Northern end of PTH 52 concurrency
Hanover		40.9	25.4	PR 311 – Niverville, Blumenort	Northern terminus; road continues north as Road 216E
1.000 mi = 1.609 km; 1.000 km = 0.621 mi: Concurrency terminus
