= Manitoba Highway 52 =

Highway in Manitoba

Provincial Trunk Highway 52
- PTH 52 highlighted in red

Route information
- Maintained by Department of Infrastructure
- Length: 35 km (22 mi)
- Existed: 1959–present

Major junctions
- West end: PTH 59 near Tourond
- PTH 12 in Steinbach
- East end: PR 210 / PR 302 at La Broquerie

Location
- Country: Canada
- Province: Manitoba
- Rural municipalities: De Salaberry; La Broquerie; Hanover
- Major cities: Steinbach

Highway system
- Provincial highways in Manitoba; Winnipeg City Routes
← PTH 50	→ PTH 57

Provincial Trunk Highway 52 (PTH 52) is a provincial highway in the Canadian province of Manitoba. It runs east from PTH 59, through the city of Steinbach, to La Broquerie where it ends at its junction with PR 210 and PR 302. It is a two-lane highway, except from Mitchell to the eastern edge of Steinbach, where it is a divided, four-lane road.

The speed limit is 100 km/h (62 mph), except within Steinbach city limits and the community of Mitchell.

== Route description ==
PTH 52 begins in the Rural Municipality of Hanover at a junction with PTH 59 just south of Tourond. It heads east, passing a weigh station as it travels along the border with the Rural Municipality of De Salaberry for few kilometers before having a short concurrency (overlap) with PR 216 just north of Kleefeld. The highway has an intersection with PR 206 south of Randolph before widening to a four-lane divided highway and traveling through Mitchell.

PTH 52 enters the city of Steinbach along Main Street and immediately passes through a major business district. It makes a sharp turn to the southeast, where it has an intersection with PTH 12 (Brandt Street / MOM's Way) before passing straight through the center of downtown. The highway exits downtown and travels through neighborhoods for a few kilometers, where it makes a sharp curve to the east, before leaving Steinbach and narrowing to two-lanes.

Entering the Rural Municipality of La Broquerie, PTH 52 travels past several past several suburbs and subdivisions for several kilometers to enter the town of La Broquerie. The highway comes to an end on the south side of town at an intersection between PR 210 and PR 302, with the road continuing east as PR 210.

The entire length of Manitoba Highway 52 is a paved provincially maintained highway.

== Major intersections ==
Division	Location	km	mi	Destinations	Notes
Hanover		0	0.0	PTH 59 – St. Malo, St. Pierre-Jolys, Winnipeg	
De Salaberry / Hanover	No major junctions				
Hanover		7	4.3	PR 216 north – New Bothwell	West end of PR 216 concurrency
Hanover		8	5.0	PR 216 south – Grunthal, Kleefeld	East end of PR 216 concurrency
Hanover		12	7.5	PR 206 north – Dugald, Landmark, Oakbank	
Hanover	Mitchell	15	9.3	Rosedale Road	Four-lane highway begins
City of Steinbach		21	13	Industrial Road	
City of Steinbach		22	14	Loewen Boulevard	West end of Main Street concurrency; PTH 52 turns southeast
City of Steinbach		22	14	PTH 12 (Brandt Street / MOM's Way) – Beausejour, Sprague, Ste. Anne	
City of Steinbach		24	15	Hespeler Street / McKenzie Avenue	PTH 52 turns east
↑ / ↓		25	16	Herschfeld Road	East end of Main Street concurrency; four-lane highway ends
La Broquerie	La Broquerie	35	22	PR 210 / PR 302 – Marchand, Richer, Ste. Anne	
1.000 mi = 1.609 km; 1.000 km = 0.621 mi: Concurrency terminus
