= Manitoba Provincial Road 210 =

Provincial road in Manitoba, Canada

Provincial Road 210
- PR 210 highlighted in red

Route information
- Maintained by Manitoba Infrastructure
- Length: 117.2 km (72.8 mi)
- Existed: 1966–present

Major junctions
- South end: PTH 12 near Piney
- PTH 52 at La Broquerie; PTH 12 near Ste. Anne; PTH 59 near Île-des-Chênes
- West end: PTH 75 near St. Adolphe

Location
- Country: Canada
- Province: Manitoba
- Rural municipalities: La Broquerie; Piney; Ritchot; Ste. Anne; Taché
- Towns: Ste. Anne

Highway system
- Provincial highways in Manitoba; Winnipeg City Routes
← PR 209	→ PR 211

Provincial Road 210 (PR 210) is a 117.2-kilometre-long (72.8 mi) provincial road in the Eastman Region of southeastern Manitoba, Canada. It serves to connect the towns and communities of Woodridge, Marchand, La Broquerie, Ste. Anne, Landmark, Linden, Île-des-Chênes, and St, Adolphe with PTH 12 (MOM's Way), PTH 59, and PTH 75 (Lord Selkirk Highway).

Although numbered as a north-south route, PR 210 is both a north-south and an east-west route.

== Route description ==
PR 210 begins at Provincial Trunk Highway (PTH) 12 approximately 14 kilometres (8.7 mi) northwest of Piney in the southeastern corner of Manitoba. It runs north to Woodridge, then turns northwest, passing through the Sandilands Provincial Forest to La Broquerie, where it meets PR 302 and the eastern terminus of PTH 52. It runs through La Broquerie and then continues northwest to the town of Ste. Anne.

At Ste. Anne, PR 210 becomes an east-west route. It meets PTH 12 again just west of Ste. Anne before continuing west to Landmark, PTH 59, and St. Adolphe. PR 210 crosses the Pierre Delorme Bridge over the Red River at St. Adolphe and ends one kilometre west at PTH 75.

PR 210 runs short concurrences with other provincial roads on three occasions: with PR 302 through La Broquerie, with PR 207 through Ste. Anne, and with PR 206 through Landmark. While the majority of PR 210 is now paved, the road south of Woodridge remains a gravel road. PR 210 between PTH 59 and PTH 75 was formerly a separate route prior to 1985, designated as PR 429.

Between PR 206 and PTH 59, PR 210 has a Class A1 loading designation from the Manitoba highways department. This allows trucks to continue using this stretch of PR 210 even when springtime weight restrictions are in effect.

== Major intersections ==
Division	Location	km	mi	Destinations	Notes
Piney		0.0	0.0	PTH 12 (MOM's Way) – Steinbach, Warroad; Road 59E – Menisino	Southern terminus; southern end of unpaved section; road continues south as Road 59E
Piney		6.1	3.8	Bridge over the Rat River	
Piney	Woodridge	13.6	8.5	Woodridge Drive	Northern end of unpaved section
Piney	Woodridge	13.9– 14.0	8.6– 8.7	PR 203	Extremely short concurrency (overlap) with PR 203 over a railroad crossing
Piney	Sandilands Provincial Forest	17.3	10.7	Whitemouth Lake Road – Whitemouth Lake	
Piney	Sandilands Provincial Forest	29.3	18.2	St. Labre Road – St. Labre	
Reynolds	Marchand Provincial Park	34.1	21.2	Marchand Provincial Park	Access road into park
Reynolds	Marchand Provincial Park	34.6	21.5	PR 404 south – Sandilands	Northern terminus of PR 404
La Broquerie	Marchand	45.3	28.1	Bridge over the Seine River	
La Broquerie	La Broquerie	55.6	34.5	PTH 52 west – Steinbach; PR 302 south (Rue Principale Street) – Zhoda	Southern end of PR 302 concurrency; eastern terminus of PTH 52
La Broquerie / Ste. Anne boundary	La Broquerie	57.3	35.6	PR 302 north – Richer	Northern end of PR 302 concurrency
Ste. Anne	Giroux	64.0	39.8	PR 311 – Richer, Blumenort	
City of Ste. Anne		74.5	46.3	Bridge over the Seine River	
City of Ste. Anne		75.4	46.9	PR 207 east (Dawson Road) – La Coulée	Eastern end of PR 207 concurrency; PR 210 switches cardinal directions from north-south to east-west
City of Ste. Anne		77.3	48.0	PR 207 west (Dawson Road) – Dufrense	Western end of PR 207 concurrency
City of Ste. Anne		77.9	48.4	Bridge over the Seine River	
Ste. Anne		78.9	49.0	PTH 12 (MOM's Way) – Beausejour, Steinbach	
Taché		87.7	54.5	Bridge over the Seine River Diversion	
Taché	Landmark	90.3	56.1	PR 206 north (Main Street) – Lorette	Eastern end of PR 206 concurrency
Taché	Landmark	91.9	57.1	PR 206 south (Main Street) – Randolph	Western end of PR 206 concurrency
Taché / Ritchot boundary		104.1	64.7	Bridge over the Manning Canal	
Ritchot	Île-des-Chênes	104.4	64.9	Old PTH 59 – Île-des-Chênes	
Ritchot	Île-des-Chênes	106.3	66.1	PTH 59 – St-Pierre-Jolys, Winnipeg	
Ritchot	St. Adolphe	115.8	72.0	PR 200 (St. Mary's Road) – Winnipeg, Ste. Agathe	
Ritchot	St. Adolphe	116.2– 116.4	72.2– 72.3	Pierre Delorme Bridge over the Red River	
Ritchot		117.2	72.8	PTH 75 (Lord Selkirk Highway) – Winnipeg, Morris	Western terminus; road continues west as Cartier Road
1.000 mi = 1.609 km; 1.000 km = 0.621 mi: Concurrency terminus; Route transition
