= Manitoba Provincial Road 206 =

Provincial road in Manitoba, Canada

Provincial Road 206
- PR 206 highlighted in red

Route information
- Maintained by Manitoba Infrastructure
- Length: 61.7 km (38.3 mi)
- Existed: 1966–present

Major junctions
- North end: PTH 44 near Kirkness
- PR 213 near Oakbank; PTH 15 at Dugald; PTH 1 (TCH) near Lorette
- South end: PTH 52 near Randolph

Location
- Country: Canada
- Province: Manitoba
- Rural municipalities: Hanover; Springfield; St. Clements; Taché

Highway system
- Provincial highways in Manitoba; Winnipeg City Routes
← PR 205	→ PR 207

Provincial Road 206 (PR 206) is a 61.7-kilometre-long (38.3 mi) north-south provincial road in the Eastman Region of Manitoba, Canada, connecting the communities of Randolph, Landmark, Dugald, Oakbank and Lockport. It also passes by Birds Hill Provincial Park.

== Route description ==
PR 206 begins at PTH 44 northeast of Winnipeg and heads south, passing through the communities of Oakbank and Dugald. Once it reaches the Trans-Canada Highway (TCH), it turns southeast and begins a three-kilometre concurrence with the TCH. The road then turns south again, passing through the hamlet of Landmark, before reaching its end at PTH 52. Aside from the TCH concurrency, PR 206 is entirely a paved, two-lane road.

PR 206 forms the eastern boundary of Birds Hill Provincial Park. The park can be accessed via the eastern gate, located north of the PR 206 and PR 213 junction.

== Major intersections ==
Division	Location	km	mi	Destinations	Notes
Hanover		0.0	0.0	PTH 52 – Steinbach, Kleefeld	Southern terminus
Hanover		6.9	4.3	Bridge over the Manning Canal	
Hanover		8.1	5.0	PR 311 – Niverville, Blumenort	
Taché	Landmark	14.7	9.1	PR 210 west – Île-des-Chênes	Southern end of PR 210 concurrency (overlap)
Taché	Landmark	16.4	10.2	PR 210 east – St. Anne	Northern end of PR 210 concurrency
Taché		17.9	11.1	Bridge over the Seine River Diversion (Siphon)	
Taché		20.8	12.9	PR 405 west – Île-des-Chênes	Eastern terminus of PR 405
Taché		21.2	13.2	Bridge over the Seine River	
Taché		21.9	13.6	PR 207 (Dawson Road) – Lorette, Dufrense	
Taché		26.8	16.7	PTH 1 (TCH) east – Kenora	Southern end of PTH 1 concurrency
Taché		28.9	18.0	PTH 1 (TCH) west – Winnipeg	Northern end of PTH 1 concurrency
Springfield	Dugald	40.4	25.1	PTH 15 (Dugald Road) – Winnipeg, Elma	
Springfield		42.0	26.1	Bridge over the Cooks Creek Diversion	
Springfield		50.3	31.3	PR 213 (Garven Road) – Winnipeg, Cooks Creek	Roundabout
Springfield	Birds Hill Provincial Park	54.2	33.7	Festival Drive – Birds Hill Provincial Park	Access road into park
St. Clements		61.7	38.3	PTH 44 – Lockport, Garson	Northern terminus
1.000 mi = 1.609 km; 1.000 km = 0.621 mi: Concurrency terminus
