= Manitoba Provincial Road 200 =

Provincial road in Manitoba, Canada

Provincial Road 200
- St. Mary's Road
- PR 200 highlighted in red

Route information
- Maintained by Manitoba Infrastructure
- Length: 101 km (63 mi)
- Existed: 1966–present

Major junctions
- North end: PTH 100 (TCH) / Route 52 in Winnipeg
- PTH 23 near Morris
- South end: PTH 75 / PR 243 near the Canada–US border at Emerson

Location
- Country: Canada
- Province: Manitoba
- Rural municipalities: De Salaberry; Emerson – Franklin; Morris; Ritchot
- Major cities: Winnipeg

Highway system
- Provincial highways in Manitoba; Winnipeg City Routes
← PTH 190	→ PR 201

Provincial Road 200 (PR 200) is a provincial road in Manitoba. It runs from the Perimeter Highway (PTH 100) at Winnipeg to the border town of Emerson, ending at Manitoba Highway (PTH) 75 at Emerson, near the Canada–United States border.

== Route description ==
PR 200 begins as a continuation of Winnipeg Route 52 (St. Mary's Road) immediately south of the Perimeter Highway in Winnipeg and runs southward parallel to the flood plain of the meandering Red River. It passes through the community of St. Adolphe and passes by Ste. Agathe before leaving the Red River to run directly south through a heavily agricultural area to the community of Dominion City. There it turns east, joining with Provincial Road 201 for 1.6 kilometres (1 mile), before turning south again, towards Emerson. At the south end of Emerson, PR 200 stops at an intersection only 3 metres (9.8 ft) from the United States border and 150 metres (490 ft) from the former Noyes–Emerson East Border Crossing, barricaded since 2006. This intersection was PR 200's original junction with PTH 75 and southern terminus. Today, PR 200 extends west from this intersection following a decommissioned section of PTH 75 (added to PR 200 in 2012) and former local service road (added to PR 200 in 2019) to its present-day junction with PTH 75 and southern terminus two kilometres (1.2 miles) north of the Pembina–Emerson Border Crossing.

== History ==
The PR 200 designation first appeared on Manitoba's official map in 1966, the first map issued after Manitoba established the Provincial Road numbering system in 1965. The northern part was originally known as St. Mary's Road (French: Chemin St. Mary's or, rarely, Chemin Ste. Marie), one of the Red River Trails connecting the francophone settlements along the eastern shore of the Red River with St. Boniface, the centre of Manitoba's French community. Much of PR 200 is now paved, but sections of the road between PR 205 and PR 305 remain a gravel road.

St. Mary's Road is continued south of Ste. Agathe by PR 246.

== Major intersections ==
Division	Location	km	mi	Destinations	Notes
Emerson-Franklin	Emerson	0.0	0.0	PTH 75 (Lord Selkirk Highway) – Winnipeg, Grand Forks, Fargo; PR 243 west (Boundary Commission Trail) – Gretna	Southern terminus of PR 200; eastern terminus of both PR 243 and the Boundary Commission Trail; continues as PR 243 west
Emerson-Franklin	Emerson	2.4– 2.7	1.5– 1.7	Bridge over the Red River	
Emerson-Franklin	Emerson	3.1	1.9	International Avenue to US 75 – Noyes, Hallock	Noyes-Emerson East Border Crossing closed since 2006
Emerson-Franklin	Emerson	7.4– 7.5	4.6– 4.7	Bridge over the Joe River	
Emerson-Franklin		11.0	6.8	PR 218 north – Ridgeville	Southern terminus of PR 218
Emerson-Franklin	Dominion City	22.5	14.0	PR 201 east – Vita	Southern end of PR 201 concurrency (overlap)
Emerson-Franklin	Dominion City	23.3	14.5	Centennial Drive – Dominion City	
Emerson-Franklin	Dominion City	24.1	15.0	PR 201 west – Letellier	Northern end of PR 201 concurrency
Emerson-Franklin	Dominion City	25.1	15.6	Waddell Avenue – Dominion City	
Emerson-Franklin	Dominion City	25.5	15.8	Bridge over the Roseau River	
Emerson-Franklin		37.3	23.2	PR 217 east – Arnaud	Southern end of PR 217 concurrency
De Salaberry		38.9	24.2	PR 217 west	Northern end of PR 217 concurrency; formerly provided access to St. Jean Baptiste prior to PR 246's Red River bridge closure in 2013
De Salaberry	Ste. Elizabeth	48.8	30.3	PTH 23 – Morris, Dufrost	
De Salaberry		58.6	36.4	PR 205 east – St-Pierre-Jolys	Southern end of PR 205 concurrency; southern end of unpaved section
De Salaberry		60.3	37.5	PR 205 west – Aubigny	Northern end of PR 205 concurrency
De Salaberry		61.5	38.2	Bridge over the Marsh River	
Ritchot		65.2	40.5	Otterburne Road – Otterburne	Former PR 303
Morris	No major junctions				
Ritchot		70.9	44.1	PR 246 south (St. Mary's Road) – Aubigny	Northern terminus of PR 246
Ritchot		74.1	46.0	PR 305 – Ste. Agathe	Northern end of unpaved section
Ritchot		77.5– 77.7	48.2– 48.3	Bridge over the Rat River	
Ritchot		80.0	49.7	PR 311 east – Niverville	Western terminus of PR 311
Ritchot	St. Adolphe	88.8	55.2	PR 210 – Île-des-Chênes	
City of Winnipeg		99.4– 99.7	61.8– 62.0	Bridge over the Red River Floodway	
City of Winnipeg		99.9	62.1	Courchaine Road – Duff Roblin Provincial Park	
City of Winnipeg		101	63	PTH 100 (TCH) (South Perimeter Highway) – Brandon, Kenora; Route 52 north (St. Mary's Road)	Northern terminus of PR 200; dogbone interchange; southern terminus of Route 52; road continues as Route 52 north
1.000 mi = 1.609 km; 1.000 km = 0.621 mi: Closed/former; Concurrency terminus
