= Manitoba Provincial Road 311 =

Provincial road in Manitoba, Canada

Provincial Road 311
- PR 311 highlighted in red

Route information
- Maintained by Department of Infrastructure
- Length: 49.1 km (30.5 mi)
- Existed: 1966–present

Major junctions
- West end: PR 200 near Niverville
- PTH 59 near Niverville; PTH 12 in Blumenort
- East end: PR 302 near Giroux

Location
- Country: Canada
- Province: Manitoba
- Rural municipalities: Hanover; Ritchot; Ste. Anne
- Towns: Niverville

Highway system
- Provincial highways in Manitoba; Winnipeg City Routes
← PR 310	→ PR 312

Provincial Road 311 (PR 311) is a 49.1-kilometre-long (30.5 mi) east-west highway in the Eastman Region of Manitoba. Lying mostly within the Rural Municipality of Hanover, it connects the towns of Niverville, New Bothwell, Blumenort, and Giroux.

== Route description ==
PR 311 begins at PR 200 in the RM of Ritchot and runs a short distance east to the town of Niverville. After passing through the town, it enters the RM of Hanover and continues eastward, intersecting with PTH 59, PR 216, and PR 206. At Blumenort, it meets PTH 12 and turns south, beginning a three kilometre concurrence between the two, after which PR 311 turns east again. It enters into the RM of Ste. Anne and continues east until it reaches PR 210 at Giroux. After crossing PR 210, PR 311 becomes a gravel road and continues a short distance further before ending at PR 302.

Manitoba Infrastructure classifies PR 311 between PTH 59 and Niverville as an RTAC route, which allows full truck and trailer access to the town.

PR 311's junction with PTH 59 is known to area residents for having a high number of vehicle collisions, prompting the addition of traffic lights and reduced speed zone at that intersection in 2015.

== Major intersections ==
Division	Location	km	mi	Destinations	Notes
Ritchot		0.0	0.0	PR 200 (St. Mary's Road) – Dominion City, St. Adolphe	Western terminus
Town of Niverville	No major junctions				
Hanover		10.8	6.7	PTH 59 – Winnipeg, St-Pierre-Jolys	
Hanover		17.4	10.8	PR 216 south (Main Street) – New Bothwell	Northern terminus of PR 216
Hanover		20.4	12.7	Bridge over Manning Canal	
Hanover		22.3	13.9	PR 206 – Landmark, Randolph	
Hanover	Blumenort	33.3	20.7	PTH 12 north (MOM's Way) – Ste. Anne	Western end of PTH 12 concurrency
Hanover		35.6	22.1	PTH 12 south (MOM's Way) – Steinbach	Eastern end of PTH 12 concurrency
Ste. Anne	Giroux	44.3	27.5	PR 210 – Ste. Anne, La Broquerie	Western end of unpaved section
Ste. Anne		46.1	28.6	Bridge over the Seine River	
Ste. Anne		49.1	30.5	PR 302 – Richer, La Broquerie	Eastern terminus; eastern end of unpaved section
1.000 mi = 1.609 km; 1.000 km = 0.621 mi: Concurrency terminus
