= Manitoba Provincial Road 336 =

Provincial Road in Manitoba, Canada

Provincial Road 336
- PR 336 highlighted in red

Route information
- Maintained by Department of Infrastructure
- Length: 16.4 km (10.2 mi)
- Existed: 1966–present

Major junctions
- South end: PTH 23 near Kane
- North end: PTH 3 / PR 205 in Sperling

Location
- Country: Canada
- Province: Manitoba
- Rural municipalities: Morris

Highway system
- Provincial highways in Manitoba; Winnipeg City Routes
← PR 334	→ PR 338

Provincial Road 336 (PR 336) is a 16.4-kilometre-long (10.2 mi) north–south highway in the western part of the Rural Municipality of Morris, Manitoba. It connects the towns of Kane and Sperling.

== Route description ==
PR 336 begins at an intersection with PTH 23 just east of the community of Kane. It heads due north along Road 11W, crossing a couple of small creeks via bridges as it travels through rural farmland for several kilometres as a two-lane gravel road. The highway now has an intersection with PR 205 before immediately coming to an end at an intersection with PTH 3, and Road 11W continues north into Sperling as a paved, two-lane highway.

== History ==
PR 336 is currently a shadow of its former self, previously stretching for 57.5 kilometres (35.7 mi), running from PR 201 near Altona, through Horndean, ran concurrently with PTH 23 westbound, then through Sperling to come to an end at a junction with PR 305. It traversed portions of the rural municipalities of Rhineland, Morris, and Macdonald. In 1992, much of PR 336 was decommissioned, like many other highways across the province, leaving only the short section between Kane and Sperling to remain.

== Major intersections ==
Division	Location	km	mi	Destinations	Notes
Morris		0.0	0.0	PTH 23 – Morris, Roland	Southern terminus; road continues south as Road 11W
Morris	Sperling	16.4	10.2	PTH 3 – Carman, Winnipeg PR 205 east – Rosenort Road 11W – Sperling	Northern terminus; western terminus of PR 205; road continues north as Road 11W
1.000 mi = 1.609 km; 1.000 km = 0.621 mi
