= Linden, Manitoba =

Linden
- Village
- Location of Linden in Manitoba.
- Coordinates: 49°39′53″N 96°52′33″W
- Country: Canada
- Province: Manitoba

Government
  - MP (Provencher): Ted Falk (CPC)
  - MLA (Dawson Trail): Bob Lagassé (Independent)
  - Mayor (RM of Taché): Justin Bohemier
  - Councillor (Ward 1): Jacques Trudeau
- Elevation: 239 m (784 ft)
- Time zone: UTC-6 (CST)
  - Summer (DST): UTC-5 (CDT)
- Postal Code: R0A 0X0

Linden is an unincorporated community in Manitoba, Canada, within the Rural Municipality of Taché. The community is centred on PR 210, approximately 4 kilometres (2.5 mi) west of Landmark and 11 kilometres (6.8 mi) south-east of Ile des Chenes.

== Notable residents ==
- Pat Falloon, professional hockey player
