= Manitoba Provincial Road 422 =

Provincial road in Manitoba, Canada

Provincial Road 422
- Meridian Road
- PR 422 highlighted in red

Route information
- Maintained by Department of Infrastructure
- Length: 11.6 km (7.2 mi)
- Existed: 1966–present

Major junctions
- South end: PTH 23 near Morris
- North end: PR 205 in Rosenort

Location
- Country: Canada
- Province: Manitoba
- Rural municipalities: Morris

Highway system
- Provincial highways in Manitoba; Winnipeg City Routes
← PR 421	→ PR 423

Provincial Road 422 (PR 422) is a provincial road in the Pembina Valley Region of the Canadian province of Manitoba. Located entirely within the Rural Municipality of Morris, it runs from Highway 23 near the town of Morris to Provincial Road 205 in Rosenort. It is a paved two-lane highway for its entire length.

Provincial Road 422 is also known as Meridian Road, as its road allowance contains the prime meridian (or first meridian) established in 1869 as part of the Dominion Land Survey of Western Canada. The prime meridian was established at 97°27′28.41″ west, with its southern end being exactly ten miles west of where the Red River crosses the border from the United States into Canada.

== Major intersections ==
Division	Location	km	mi	Destinations	Notes
Morris		0.0	0.0	PTH 23 – Morris, Lowe Farm	Southern terminus
Morris	Rosenort	11.6	7.2	PR 205 – Sperling, Rosenort	Northern terminus; road continues north as Meridian Road
1.000 mi = 1.609 km; 1.000 km = 0.621 mi
