= Manitoba Provincial Road 217 =

Provincial road in Manitoba, Canada

Provincial Road 217
- PR 200 highlighted in red

Route information
- Maintained by Manitoba Infrastructure
- Length: 26.3 km (16.3 mi)
- Existed: 1966–present

Major junctions
- West end: PR 246 near St. Jean Baptiste
- PR 200 near Arnaud
- East end: PR 218 near Carlowrie

Location
- Country: Canada
- Province: Manitoba
- Rural municipalities: De Salaberry; Emerson – Franklin; Montcalm

Highway system
- Provincial highways in Manitoba; Winnipeg City Routes
← PR 216	→ PR 218

Provincial Road 217 (PR 217) is a short provincial road in the Canadian province of Manitoba. It begins at PR 246 (St. Mary's Road) near St. Jean Baptiste and runs east to PR 219 near Carlowrie, passing through the community of Arnaud. It is mostly a gravel road.

== Major intersections ==
Division	Location	km	mi	Destinations	Notes
Montcalm		0.0	0.0	PR 246 (St. Mary's Road) – St. Jean Baptiste, Aubigny	Western terminus, western end of unpaved section, access to St. Jean Baptiste has been cut-off since the 2015 closing of PR 246's Red River bridge
De Salaberry		11.4	7.1	PR 200 north – Ste. Agathe	Western end of PR 200 concurrency (overlap); eastern end of unpaved section
Emerson-Franklin		13.1	8.1	PR 200 south – Dominion City	Eastern end of PR 200 concurrency
Emerson-Franklin		26.3	16.3	PR 218 – Ridgeville, St. Malo	Eastern terminus
1.000 mi = 1.609 km; 1.000 km = 0.621 mi: Concurrency terminus
