= Manitoba Provincial Road 246 =

Provincial road in Manitoba, Canada

Provincial Road 246
- St. Mary's Road; Caron Street
- PR 246 highlighted in red

Route information
- Maintained by Manitoba Infrastructure
- Length: 36 km (22 mi)

Major junctions
- North end: PR 200 near Ste. Agathe
- PTH 23 near Morris
- South end: PTH 75 at St. Jean Baptiste

Location
- Country: Canada
- Province: Manitoba
- Rural municipalities: Montcalm; Morris; Ritchot

Highway system
- Provincial highways in Manitoba; Winnipeg City Routes
← PR 245	→ PR 247

Provincial Road 246 (PR 246) is a 36.0-kilometre-long (22.4 mi) provincial road in both the Pembina Valley and Eastman regions of the Canadian province of Manitoba. It runs from PR 200 near Ste. Agathe to PTH 75 at St. Jean Baptiste.

Both PR 246 and PR 200 are often referred to as St. Mary's Road, as the two roads mostly follow the old St. Mary's Road that once connected Winnipeg and Emerson on the east side of the Red River. Today, most of PR 246 is gravel road; only a short section near St. Jean Baptiste is paved. The southern terminus of PR 246 at St. Jean Baptiste has been cut off from the rest of the road since the bridge over the Red River was closed in 2013 and later demolished.

A 13-kilometre (8.1 mi) section between PR 205 and Provincial Trunk Highway (PTH) 23 was upgraded and paved in 2021 by the Manitoba government to serve as a detour for when PTH 75, a major transportation route that runs along the west side of the river, is closed at Morris due to flooding.

== History ==
Prior to 1992, PR 246 continued 18.9 kilometres (11.7 mi) southwest from St. Jean Baptiste along Road 18N and Road 3E, crossing PTH 14 along its way to St. Joseph, where it came to an end at an intersection with PR 201. The 6.5 kilometres (4.0 mi) section between PR 201 in St. Joseph and PTH 14 is now known as PR 426, being known as PR 420 between 1994 and 2008.

== Major intersections ==
Division	Location	km	mi	Destinations	Notes
Montcalm	St. Jean Baptiste	0.0	0.0	PTH 75 (Lord Selkirk Highway) – Letellier, Morris	Southern terminus; road continues as Road 18 NE
Montcalm	St. Jean Baptiste	0.6	0.37	Bridge over the Plum River	
Montcalm	St. Jean Baptiste	1.6	0.99	Caron Street to PTH 75	
Montcalm	St. Jean Baptiste	1.7– 2.0	1.1– 1.2	Bridge over the Red River (closed in 2013)	
Montcalm		3.0	1.9	PR 217 east – Arnaud	Western terminus of PR 217; southern end of unpaved section; begins following St. Mary's Road
Montcalm - Morris boundary		13.0	8.1	PTH 23 – Morris, Dufrost	Northern end of unpaved section
Morris	Aubigny	26.1	16.2	PR 205 – Rosenort, St-Pierre-Jolys	Southern end of unpaved section
Ritchot		36.0	22.4	PR 200 (St. Mary's Road) – Ste. Agathe, Dominion City	Northern terminus; northern end of unpaved section; St. Mary's Road follows PR 200 northbound
1.000 mi = 1.609 km; 1.000 km = 0.621 mi: Closed/former
