= New Bothwell, Manitoba =

New Bothwell
- Local urban district
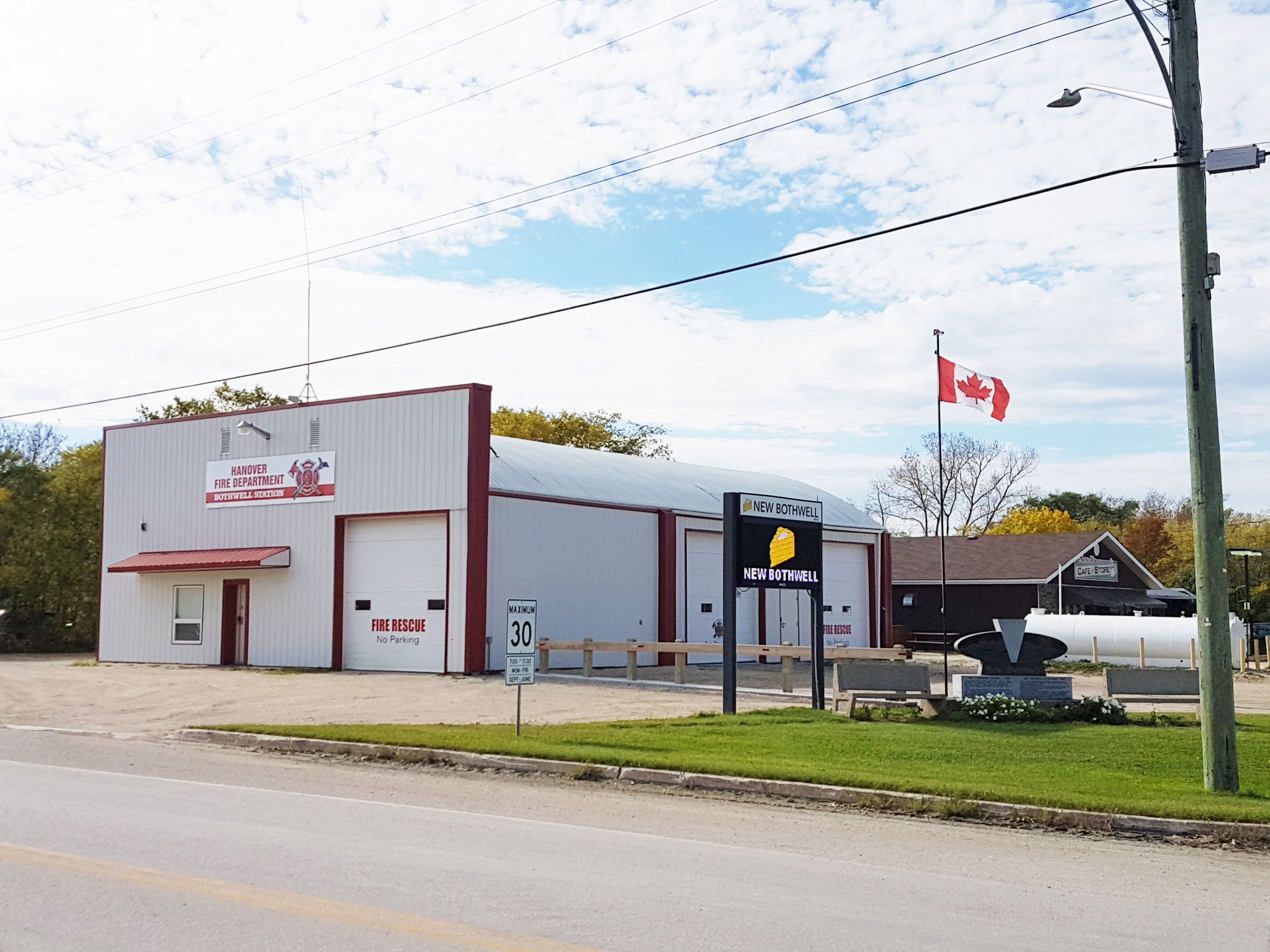
- The New Bothwell Town Centre with the local Hanover Fire Department hall in the background.
- Nickname: The Cheese Capital
- Location of New Bothwell in Manitoba
- Coordinates: 49°35′26.9″N 96°53′20.9″W
- Country: Canada
- Province: Manitoba
- Region: Eastman
- Rural Municipality: Hanover
- Established: 1874

Government
  - MP (Provencher): Ted Falk (CPC)
  - MLA (La Verendrye): Konrad Narth (PC)

Population
  - Estimate (2021): 855
- Time zone: UTC-6 (CST)
  - Summer (DST): UTC-5 (CDT)
- Postal Code: R0A 1C0
- Website: newbothwell.ca

New Bothwell, originally called Kronsthal, is a local urban district in the Rural Municipality of Hanover, Manitoba, Canada. It is located approximately 15 kilometres (9 miles) northwest of Steinbach on Provincial Road 216, one kilometre (1 mile) south of Provincial Road 311 and six kilometres (4 miles) north of Highway 52. It has a population of approximately 500.

New Bothwell is serviced by a post office, a restaurant/convenience store (now closed), recreation centre, an elementary/junior high school, a fire station, and two nearby churches. The local Chamber of Commerce and the local recreation committee organize community events such as an annual fall dinner and the winter carnival.

== History ==
The New Bothwell area were originally lands of the nomadic Ojibway-speaking Anishinabe people. The Anishinabe people signed Treaty 1 in 1871 and moved onto reserves such as the Brokenhead Indian Reserve and Roseau River Anishinabe First Nation Reserve. In 1874, Mennonites began immigrating to the area from the Bergthal Colony in southern Russia (now Ukraine). Several small villages were established throughout the East Reserve, although nearly all have disappeared. One of the original East Reserve villages was Kronsthal (generally translated as 'Crown Valley' although local historians suggest 'Crane Valley' may have been the intent), which was located on the western edge of what is now New Bothwell. It consisted of a few farms and a private school, among other things.

The first public school districts in the area—Arran, Moray, Seaton, and Bothwell—were created in 1919. The Bothwell School was located a half mile east of Kronsthal. Not long after the school was opened, businesses (such as the cheese factory in 1936) and families began to locate themselves near the school, and the entire village ended up moving a half mile east. Over the years, New Bothwell did eventually expand westward to encompass the former site of Kronstal.

The name Bothwell originates with the establishment of the Bothwell School in 1919. The Canadian government deliberately chose British names, such as Mitchell, Randolph, Bothwell, and others in an attempt to assimilate the Mennonites into Canadian culture. The town, however, remained under the name Kronsthal until 1939, when the post office was established. "Bothwell" had been the first choice to register as the community's official name, as it was the name of the public school. However, this name was already registered in Ontario, so the word "New" was added to the town name.

By the 1960s, New Bothwell remained as the only village in the surrounding area. The old school districts that served the area were eliminated and replaced with a new government run school at New Bothwell, part of the new Hanover School Division. Although no longer in existence, the old villages and school districts are still referred to by those who remember them.

In the 1990s, the Rural Municipality of Hanover established a fire station at New Bothwell, one of four operated by the municipality's fire department. New Bothwell was organized as a local urban district within the R.M. of Hanover in 2022.

== Bothwell Cheese ==
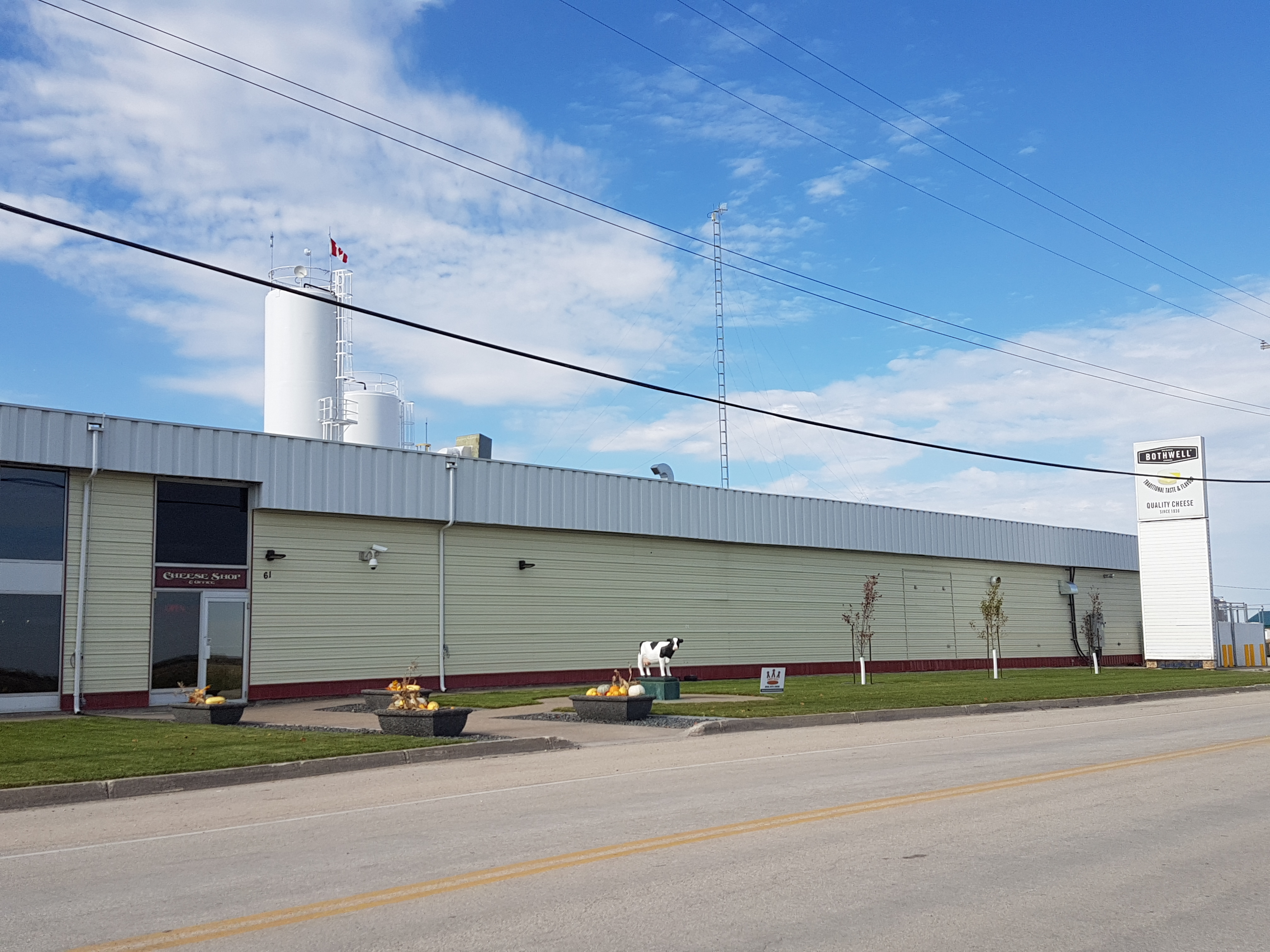
Bothwell Cheese Factory located in the town.

New Bothwell is home to award-winning cheese producer Bothwell Cheese. Established in 1936, Bothwell Cheese was originally a co-operative owned by the local dairy producers. Over the years, Bothwell Cheese has earned a solid reputation as a world-class cheese maker, producing over 25 varieties of cheese, and made the community known for its cheese.

== Notable people ==
- Kate Cameron, curler
- Joe Doerksen, former mixed-martial artist for the UFC
- Audrey Poetker, poet
- Jack Thiessen, writer, academic
