= Sarto, Manitoba =

Sarto
- Village
- Location of Sarto in Manitoba.
- Coordinates: 49°23′57″N 96°44′37″W
- Country: Canada
- Province: Manitoba
- Named for: Giuseppe Melchiorre Sarto (Pope Pius X)

Government
  - MP (Provencher): Ted Falk (CPC)
  - MLA (La Verendrye): Konrad Narth (PC)
  - Reeve (Hanover): Stan Toews
  - Councillor (Ward 4): John Giesbrecht
- Elevation: 287 m (942 ft)
- Time zone: UTC-6 (CST)
  - Summer (DST): UTC-5 (CDT)
- Postal Code: R0A 1X0

Sarto is an unincorporated community in Manitoba, Canada, within the Rural Municipality of Hanover. The community is centred on PR 205, 7.5 kilometres (4.7 miles) west of Grunthal and 16 kilometres (10 miles) south-west of Steinbach.

It was originally called New York by the French Canadians who settled there. The post office was opened in 1904, and it was named after Pope Pius X, born Giuseppe Melchiorre Sarto. Some have claimed that the community had been named after Andrea del Sarto, a noted Italian Renaissance painter.

Sarto has two churches, St. Michael's Ukrainian Catholic Church and Sts. Peter and Paul Ukrainian Orthodox Church.
