= Dugald, Manitoba =

Dugald
- Unincorporated community
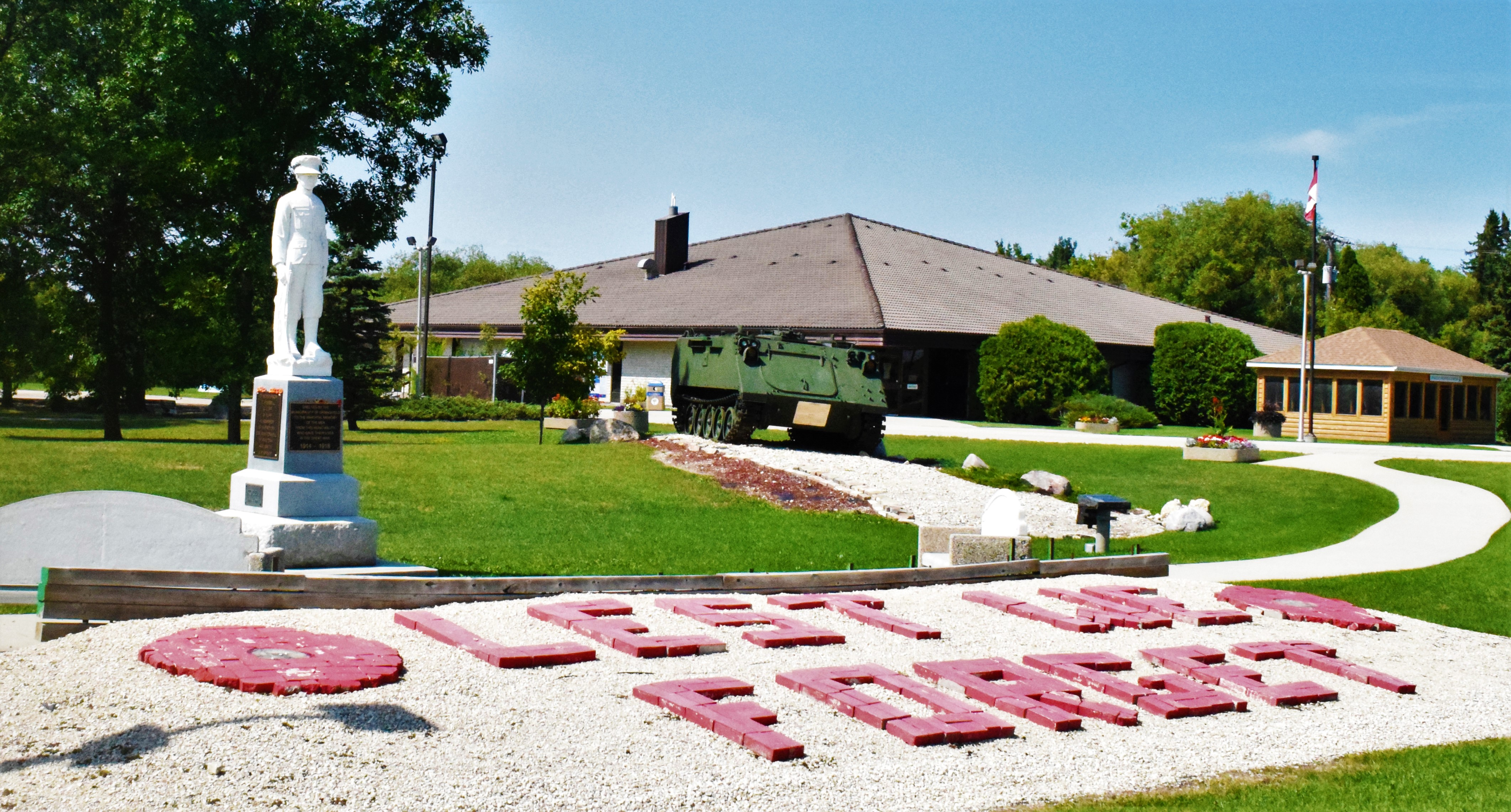
- The war memorial and public library in Dugald.

- Location of Dugald in Manitoba
- Coordinates: 49°53′08″N 96°50′21″W
- Country: Canada
- Province: Manitoba
- Region: Eastman
- Rural Municipality: R.M. of Springfield

Government
  - MP (Provencher): Ted Falk (CPC)
  - MLA (Springfield-Ritchot): Ron Schuler (PC)

Area
  - Total: 3.02 km^{2} (1.17 sq mi)
- Elevation: 242 m (794 ft)

Population (2016)
  - Total: 580
  - Density: 190/km^{2} (500/sq mi)
- Time zone: UTC-6 (CST)
  - Summer (DST): UTC-5 (CDT)
- Postal code: R0E 0K0
- FSA: R5P
- Area codes: 204, 431, 584
- Website: http://dugaldmb.ca

Dugald is a community in Manitoba, Canada, located 10 kilometres east of Winnipeg at the junction of PTH 15 and Provincial Road 206 in the Rural Municipality of Springfield. It was the site of a railway accident in 1947.

In the Dugald train disaster of September 1947, a Canadian National Railway passenger train consisting of older wooden-bodied passenger cars collided with a transcontinental passenger train made up of newer steel cars, resulting in severe damage and fatalities on the older train. This accident led to the retirement of the less crashworthy wooden cars.

Dugald was also the home to the Costume Museum, a museum dedicated to Canadian fashion. The museum relocated to downtown Winnipeg in 2006.

Dugald is the birthplace of former National Hockey League goaltender Trevor Kidd, who played in 387 regular season games for four teams.

== Demographics ==
In the 2021 Census of Population conducted by Statistics Canada, Dugald had a population of 614 living in 279 of its 284 total private dwellings, a change of 5.9% from its 2016 population of 580. With a land area of 3.02 km^{2} (1.17 sq mi), it had a population density of 203.3/km^{2} (526.6/sq mi) in 2021.

== See also ==
- Lists of rail accidents
