= The Robb Nash Project =

Canadian rock band

- Origin: Winnipeg, Manitoba, Canada
- Genre: alternative/modern rock
- Years active: 2007-present
- Members: Robb Nash; Jonny Holliday; Anthony Anderson
- Website: www.robbnash.com

The Robb Nash Project is a Canadian rock band from Winnipeg, Manitoba.

== History ==
Musician Bobby Reimer grew up in the Mennonite farming community of Kleefeld, Manitoba. While still in high school, he suffered major head injuries in an automobile accident. Surviving the crash impacted Reimer to become a musician and motivational speaker. Reimer adopted the stage name Robb Nash and formed the band I Witness, which released a number of singles in the early 2000s. He later changed the name of the band to Live On Arrival as a reference to his accident.

== Live On Arrival ==
Nash formed Live On Arrival with Bobby McKay (guitar), Jonny Holiday (drums), Lenard Penner (bass), and Matt Cairns (guitar). The band released a number of singles in 2007 and 2008 including "Hello Goodbye", "Ready Set No", and "Wanna Be." They toured with Hedley, Finger Eleven, Buckcherry and others. The band has played over 1000 shows, including We Day alongside Lights, Hedley, Marianas Trench and speakers such as Larry King and Martin Sheen.

The band is currently known as the Robb Nash Project. In 2018, Nash was given the Order of Manitoba, while in 2019 he was awarded the Meritorious Service Medal by Canadian Governor General Julie Payette.

== Members ==
- Robb Nash - Lead Vocals, Rhythm Guitar
- Jonny Holliday - Drums
- Anthony Anderson - Lead Guitar, Keys/Synth
