= Bothwell Cheese =

Award winning cheese manufacturer based in New Bothwell, Manitoba, Canada

Bothwell Cheese, Inc.
- Type: Private
- Industry: Food processing
- Founded: 1936
- Headquarters: New Bothwell, Manitoba, Canada
- Number of employees: 60
- Website: bothwellcheese.com/

Bothwell Cheese is known for its cheeses which are branded under the same name. The company, located in New Bothwell, Manitoba, was founded in 1936 as a co-operative by local farmers. It operated as such until 2002, when it was purchased by a group of private investors.

== Products ==
Bothwell Cheese produces over 25 varieties of cheddar, mozzarella, smoked, traditional, and specialty cheeses. It also sells cheese curds, different flavors of shredded cheese, and variety packages.

The company operates retail shops in New Bothwell and Winnipeg where it sells fresh cheese and company branded merchandise. It also ships more than two million kilograms of cheese to grocery retailers throughout Canada each year, including major grocery chains Costco, Sobeys, Safeway, Giant Tiger and Loblaws.

== Awards ==
In 2014, Bothwell Cheese took top prize for its Marble in the cheddar class at the British Empire Cheese Show, a title it has earned eight of the past nine years. It was also awarded first place in the Monterrey Jack class the previous year. This competition is one of Canada's most prestigious cheese competitions and features distinguished cheese makers from around the world.

Bothwell Cheese also took home three awards at the 2006 Canadian Western Agribition Cheese Competition in Regina, Saskatchewan. Bothwell was named Grand Champion in the two-year-old aged white cheddar class, while also receiving awards in the cheddar and open classes.

The Manitoba Chamber of Commerce named Bothwell Cheese the 2011 Business of the Year and their Manitoba Business Awards. It has also been nominated in the category of Outstanding Manitoba Ambassador.

== See also ==
- List of cheesemakers
