= La Rochelle, Manitoba =

La Rochelle
- Location of La Rochelle in Manitoba
- Coordinates: 49°21′20″N 96°58′48″W
- Country: Canada
- Province: Manitoba
- Region: Eastman
- Census Division: No. 2

Government
  - Governing Body: Rural Municipality of De Salaberry Council
  - MP: Ted Falk
  - MLA: Konrad Narth
- Time zone: UTC−6 (CST)
  - Summer (DST): UTC−5 (CDT)
- Area codes: 204, 431
- NTS Map: 062H07
- GNBC Code: GAOFK

La Rochelle is a locality within the Rural Municipality of De Salaberry in south-eastern Manitoba, Canada. It is located approximately 60 kilometers (37 miles) south of Winnipeg. Established by Métis families in 1859, La Rochelle is the oldest community of the Rural Municipality of De Salaberry.

La Rochelle was the site of a small prisoner-of-war camp that held German soldiers captured during World War II. The camp was located just north of the intersection of Highway 59 and 23. It was a work camp that provided labour for working in sugar beets fields.
