= Manitoba Provincial Road 421 =

Provincial Road in Manitoba, Canada

Provincial Road 421
- PR 421 highlighted in red

Route information
- Maintained by Department of Infrastructure
- Length: 20.5 km (12.7 mi)
- Existed: 1966–present

Major junctions
- West end: PTH 30 near Altona
- East end: PTH 75 north of Emerson

Location
- Country: Canada
- Province: Manitoba
- Rural municipalities: Rhineland, Montcalm

Highway system
- Provincial highways in Manitoba; Winnipeg City Routes
← PR 419	→ PR 422

Provincial Road 421 (PR 421) is a 20.5-kilometre-long (12.7 mi) east–west highway in the Pembina Valley Region of Manitoba. It connects Altona with Letellier and Emerson via Gnadenfeld, Neubergthal, and Sommerfeld.

== Route description ==
PR 421 begins in the Municipality of Rhineland at a junction with PTH 30 just south of Altona. It heads due east, travelling through the centre of both Gnadenfeld and Neubergthal before grazing along the northern side of Sommerfeld. The highway now travels through rural farmland for several kilometres, crossing Road 4E (former PR 522), which provides access to the hamlet of Halbstadt, before entering the Rural Municipality of Montcalm. After crossing a bridge over the Marais River, PR 421 comes to an end a short distance later at an intersection with PTH 75 (Lord Selkirk Highway), roughly halfway between Emerson and Letellier. The entire length of PR 421 is a paved two-lane highway.

== Major intersections ==
Division	Location	km	mi	Destinations	Notes
Rhineland		0.0	0.0	PTH 30 – Gretna, Altona	Western terminus; road continues west as Road 5N
Rhineland	Sommerfeld	7.2	4.5	Rhineland Street – Sommerfeld	
Rhineland		13.2	8.2	Road 4E – Halbstadt	Former PR 522 south
Montcalm		17.9	11.1	Bridge over the Marais River	
Montcalm		20.5	12.7	PTH 75 (Lord Selkirk Highway) – Winnipeg, Emerson	Eastern terminus; road continues east as Road 5N
1.000 mi = 1.609 km; 1.000 km = 0.621 mi
