= James Urry =

New Zealand historian

James Urry (born 25 March 1949 in London, England) is a New Zealand anthropologist, historian, author and professor at the School of Social and Cultural Studies at Victoria University of Wellington in Wellington, New Zealand. Urry is considered an authority on the history of Russian Mennonites.

Urry did his undergraduate studies at the University College London and his DPhil. at Oxford University. He has published extensively on the history of anthropology and Russian Mennonites in Canada, including None But Saints: the Transformation of Mennonite Life in Russia, 1789-1989 (1989), Before Social Anthropology: Essays on the History of British Anthropology (1993), Mennonites, Politics, and Peoplehood: Europe, Russia, Canada, 1525-1980 (2006).
