= Aubigny, Manitoba =

Aubigny
- Location of Aubigny in Manitoba
- Coordinates: 49°27′29.1″N 97°14′47.9″W
- Country: Canada
- Province: Manitoba
- Region: Pembina Valley
- Census Division: No. 3
- Rural Municipality: R.M. of Morris

Government
  - Mayor: Mayor Miguel Laroche
  - MP (Provencher): Ted Falk
  - MLA (Midland): Lauren Stone
- Time zone: UTC−6 (CST)
  - Summer (DST): UTC−5 (CDT)

Aubigny is a small, unincorporated community in the Rural Municipality of Morris, Manitoba, Canada. It is located approximately 31 kilometres (19 miles) south of Winnipeg along the Red River, at the junction of Provincial Road (PR) 205 and St. Mary's Road (PR 246).

Aubigny is still a mostly French-speaking community that consists of several homes and a Roman Catholic church. The bridge over the Red River provides primary access to Aubigny, as it links the community to Highway 75 2 kilometres (1.2 miles) to the west.

== Etymology ==
Aubigny is named in 1903 for Count Antoine d'Aubigny, a French nobleman, who established the local parish with his wealth. Before this, the community was known as La Grande Pointe de la Saline, which translates from French to mean The Large Pointe of the Salt Marsh.

== History ==
The first settlers, all of Québécois-heritage, came from Nashua, New Hampshire in 1877, more francophone settlers from Eastern Canada arrived throughout the 1880s. The Aubigny post office was opened in 1885 and was closed in 1970. The Provencher School served the area from 1898 to 1968 and was taught by nuns from the Sisters of Holy Cross order from 1932 until its closure. The parish was founded in 1903, with the original church, a wooden structure, was constructed in 1904. St. Anthony of Padua was declared patron of the church in 1911. It was later replaced by a brick one in 1932, which was rebuilt in 1978 after a tornado destroyed it. In the 1950 flood, the centre of the village was spared, however all roads leading to Aubigny were inundated, necessitating the evacuation of the community. A local credit union was founded in 1961. A bridge was completed across the Red River in 1966, replacing the succession of ferries which had served the community since 1884.

=== Tornado ===
On June 19, 1978, Aubigny, among other communities, was struck by a severe tornado. It damaged or destroyed three quarters of all the buildings in the village, including the church, the post office and the credit union. 19 locals had to be treated in hospital, but none were seriously hurt or perished. While the church suffered severe damage, most of the sacred objects within were left untouched, including the tabernacle and most of the statues.

== Population ==
In 1903, the Catholic parish comprised 32 families with a total population of 255. This increased to 60 families in 1953, but by 1978, had decreased to 56.Including families not belonging to the parish, 73 families resided in the Aubigny district in 1979.
