= St. Malo Provincial Park =

Provincial park in Manitoba, Canada

- Location within Manitoba
- Interactive map of St. Malo Provincial Park
- Location: Manitoba, Canada
- Nearest city: St. Malo, Manitoba
- Coordinates: 49°19′11″N 96°55′42″W
- Area: 148.35 ha (366.6 acres)
- Established: 1961
- Governing body: Government of Manitoba

St. Malo Provincial Park is a provincial park on the Rat River near St. Malo, Manitoba, Canada. The 148.35 ha (0.5728 sq mi) park is located adjacent to St. Malo Lake in the Interlake Plain Ecoregion.

== History ==
St. Malo Provincial Park was designated a provincial park by the Government of Manitoba in 1961.

== See also ==
- List of provincial parks in Manitoba
