= Blumenort, Manitoba =

Blumenort
- Local urban district
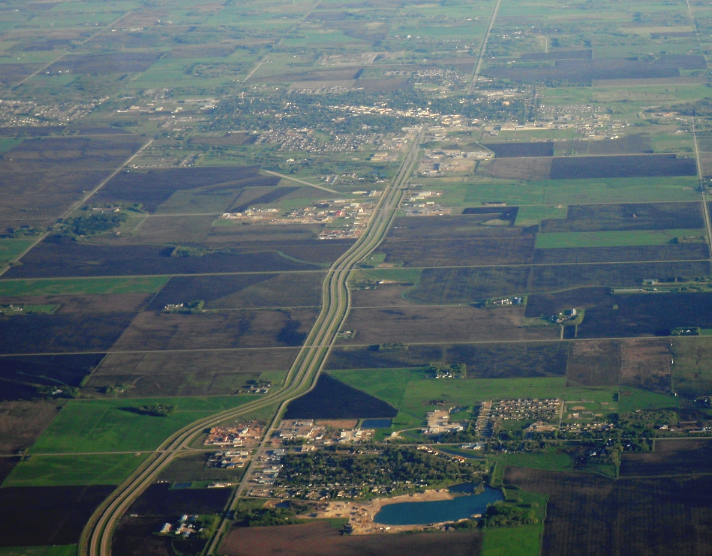
- Blumenort (located in the lower portion) as seen from the air with Steinbach (upper) seen to the southern part of the picture.

- Location of Blumenort in Manitoba
- Coordinates: 49°36′16″N 96°41′20″W
- Country: Canada
- Province: Manitoba
- Region: Eastman
- Rural Municipality: Hanover
- Established: 1876

Government
  - MP (Provencher): Ted Falk (CPC)
  - MLA (Steinbach): Kelvin Goertzen (PC)

Area
  - Total: 3.17 km^{2} (1.22 sq mi)
- Elevation: 268 m (879 ft)

Population (2021 Census)
  - Total: 1,738
  - Density: 548.2/km^{2} (1,420/sq mi)
  - Change 2011-16: ▲19.3%
- Time zone: UTC-6 (CST)
  - Summer (DST): UTC-5 (CDT)
- Website: https://blumenortmb.com

Blumenort (Plautdietsch: [ˈblœmn̩ˌuɐ̯t]) is a local urban district in the Canadian province of Manitoba. It is located in the Rural Municipality of Hanover, 4.1 kilometres (2.5 miles) north of the city of Steinbach. It was founded in 1874 by Plautdietsch-speaking Mennonite farmers from the Russian Empire. Today, its economy is based on agriculture and the service industry.

== Etymology ==
Blumenort comes from the German Blumenort, meaning flower place.

== History ==
Prior to about 1870, south-eastern Manitoba, including the Blumenort area, were hunting, fishing, and trapping grounds used by the nomadic Ojibway people. In 1871, the government began negotiating the articles of the Ojibway land claims for this region of Manitoba. After signing Treaty 1, the First Nations people of south-eastern Manitoba moved onto the Brokenhead and Rousseau River Reserves. Soon, the Canadian government surveyed the land and readied it for expansion by European settlers.

In 1873, Plautdietsch-speaking Mennonites from the Russian Empire sent a delegation to investigate land in North America. Four of the delegates decided to advise their people to settle in Manitoba and a Privilegium was signed between with the Canadian government. The document guaranteed Mennonites religious freedom, private school, military exemption and land that became known as the East Reserve. The East Reserve contained dozens of villages, only a few of which still exist today. One of those villages was Blumenort. The first Mennonite settlers were of the conservative Kleine Gemeinde church who founded Blumenort in the summer of 1874. In 1875, Blumenort consisted of 24 families, but had dropped to 18 by 1878.

The original settlement form was the traditional linear settlement, or street village, of Plautdietsch-speaking Russian Mennonites. A blacksmith shop was established in 1874, but the first store only opened in 1896. A cheese factory was built in 1892 and a milk skimming station in 1914, but the former closed by 1920.

The street village began breaking up around 1904, a process which was completed by 1910, as the farmers disbursed to move onto the land they farmed and to seek new land elsewhere. Within a few years, little evidence of the former community remained, its street serving as a driveway for two farming families.

In 1932, the farmers of the Blumenort area decided to build a cheese factory on a ridge, about a mile from the site of the former community, which brought further development. By 1940, there were 16 families and six businesses located along or near the mile road now called Blumenort's Centre Avenue. In 1947, a poultry-killing and processing plant opened. In 1962, a post office was opened and in 1971, a 12-room school was erected. By 1971, the population had grown to 275.

Blumenort has continued to expand, growing to 1738 people by 2021, up from 1404 in 2011 and 1675 in 2016.

The community provides a local elementary school as well as the Blumenort Community Church, an Evangelical Mennonite Conference Church and Hope Church Blumenort, a non-denominational Church.

== Demographics ==
In the 2021 Census of Population conducted by Statistics Canada, Blumenort had a population of 1,738 living in 564 of its 578 total private dwellings, a change of 3.8% from its 2016 population of 1,675. With a land area of 3.17 km^{2} (1.22 sq mi), it had a population density of 548.3/km^{2} (1,420.0/sq mi) in 2021.

== Economy ==
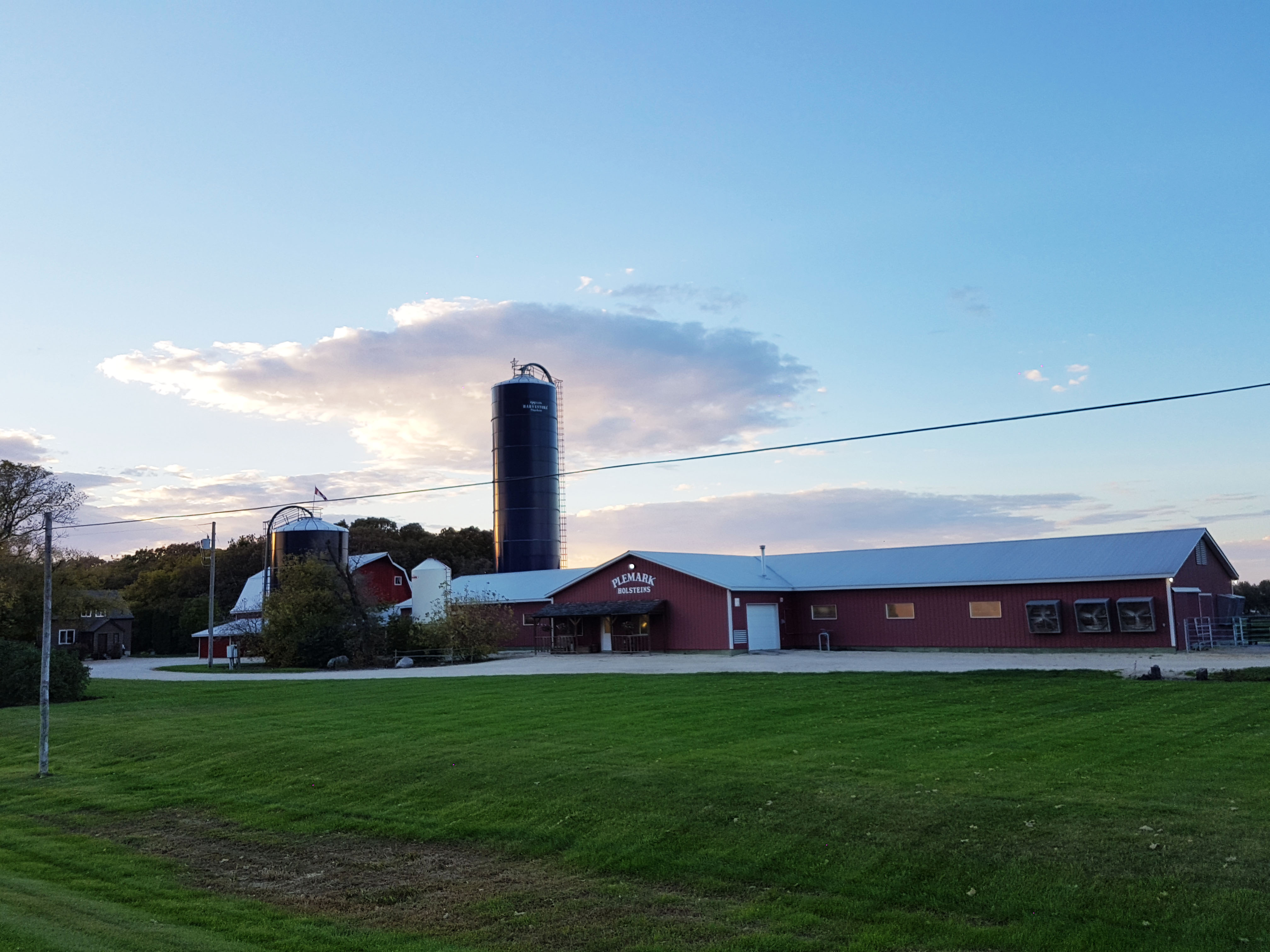
A dairy farm in Blumenort

Blumenort is supported by several local businesses including magazine companies, poultry producers, transport companies, and vehicle repair companies. In addition to this, because of its proximity to Steinbach, many people from Blumenort commute to Steinbach for shopping, work and sometimes school. As a small town in southern Manitoba, much of the commercial business is related to the agricultural sector and several dairy farms are located in and near the town of Blumenort.

== Transportation ==
Blumenort is located on Manitoba Provincial Road 311, near its intersection with Provincial Trunk Highway 12. PTH 12 once passed through Blumenort, but now bypasses around the east side of the community.

== Notable people ==
- Royden Loewen, historian

== See also ==
- Blumenort, Saskatchewan
