= Rural Municipality of Taché =

Taché
- Rural municipality
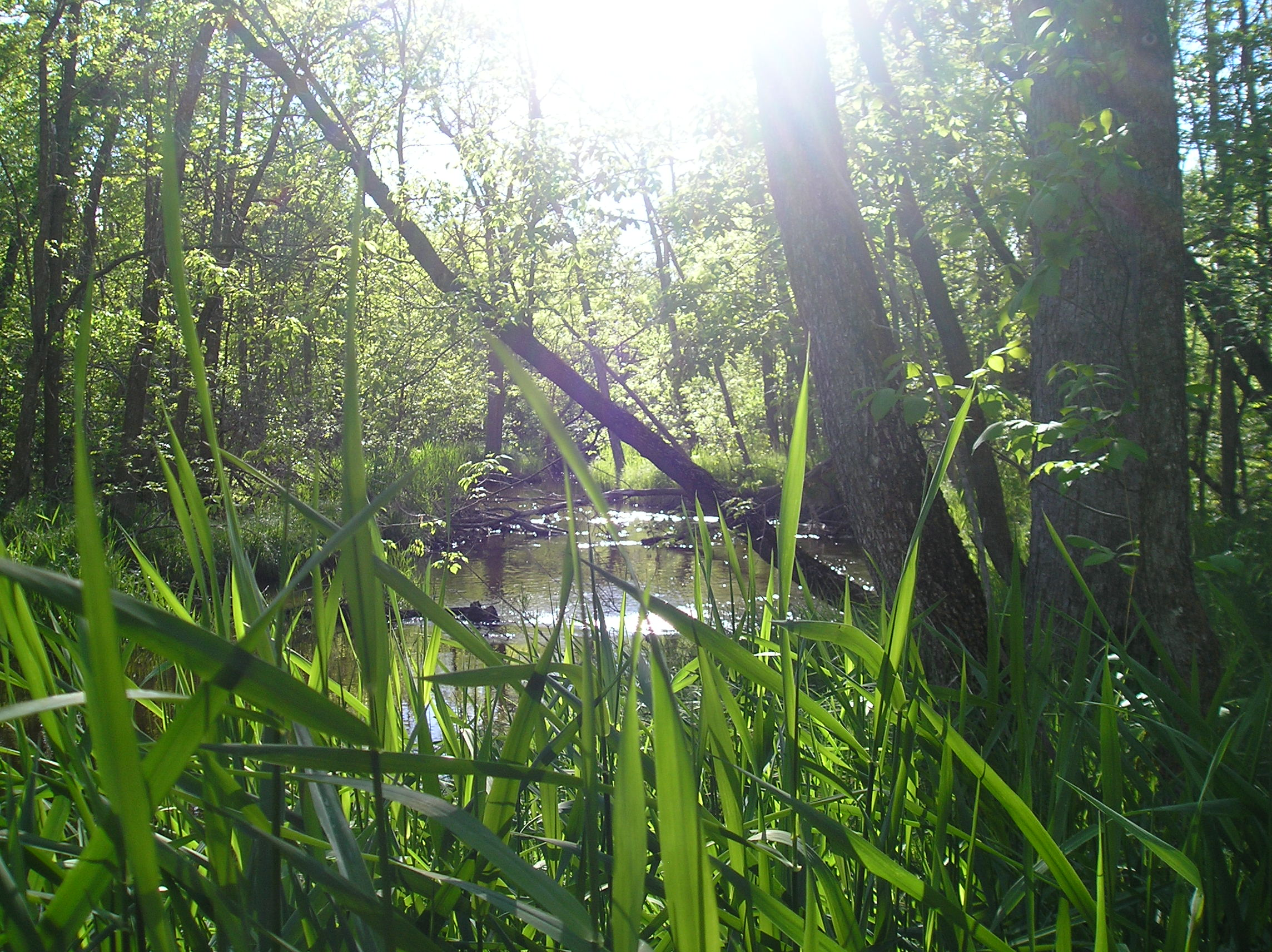
- La Coulée River is a tributary of the Seine River, in Taché

- Location of the RM of Taché in Manitoba
- Coordinates: 49°42′29″N 96°40′25″W
- Country: Canada
- Province: Manitoba
- Region: Eastman and Winnipeg Metro
- First settled: 1880
- Named for: Alexandre-Antonin Taché

Government
  - Mayor: Armand Poirier

Area
  - Rural municipality: 581.23 km^{2} (224.41 sq mi)
  - Metro: 5,306.79 km^{2} (2,048.96 sq mi)
- Elevation: 246 m (807 ft)

Population (2016)
  - Rural municipality: 11,568
  - Density: 19.903/km^{2} (51.548/sq mi)
  - Metro: 778,489
- Time zone: UTC−6 (CST)
  - Summer (DST): UTC−5 (CDT)
- Forward Sortation Area: R5J, R5K, R0A
- Area codes: 204, 431
- Website: rmtache.ca

Taché (French: Municipalité rurale de Taché) is a rural municipality in Manitoba, Canada, incorporated in 1880.

Named after the Bishop Taché (one of the first bishops in Manitoba), it is located to the south-east of Winnipeg, stretching from the Red River Floodway in the west to the beginning of the Canadian Shield in the east. Trees line the Seine River as it meanders through the centre of the municipality and acts as an oasis of oak and elm trees in the primarily agricultural fields of the area. Lorette and Landmark are the main residential and commercial hubs of the municipality with Ste-Genevieve, Dufresne, Ross, and Linden as other noteworthy communities.

In 1998 a new high school, Collège Lorette Collegiate, was completed in the town of Lorette. The town is also home to the municipal office and to the board offices of the Seine River School Division and the Franco-manitoban School Division.

As per Statistics Canada, Taché's population in 2016 was 11,568.

== History ==
In 1891, the subdistrict of Taché had a population of 910.

== Communities ==
- Dufresne
- Landmark
- Linden
- Lorette
- Rosewood
- Ross
- Ste-Geneviève

== Demographics ==
Ethnic Origins (2011)
	Population	Percentage
French	3,455	33.7%
Canadian	2,830	27.6%
German	2,465	24.0%
Scottish	1,995	19.5%
English	1,975	19.3%
Ukrainian	1,655	16.1%
Metis	1,520	14.8%
Irish	1,365	13.3%
Russian	955	9.3%
Dutch	735	7.2%
Note that more than one ethnic origin can be reported per person

In the 2021 Census of Population conducted by Statistics Canada, Taché had a population of 11,916 living in 3,999 of its 4,117 total private dwellings, a change of 3% from its 2016 population of 11,568. With a land area of 580.64 km^{2} (224.19 sq mi), it had a population density of 20.5/km^{2} (53.2/sq mi) in 2021.

The median worth of a dwelling is $319,779 in Taché, a bit lower than the provincial median at $275,473. The average household has 3.1 people. The median (after-tax) household income in the area is $79,026, quite higher than the provincial amount at $59,093. The median age of Taché is 34.8, significantly younger than then national median at 41.2 years old, and the provincial median at 38.3 years old.

The census also reports that 73.9% of the residents mother tongue was English, followed by; French (11.6%) and German (5.4%).

Language	Population	Pct (%)
English only	8,800	73.9%
French only	1,395	11.7%
Both English and French	265	2.2%
Other languages	1,280	10.7%

Taché is mostly inhabited by European descendants, however has a large Aboriginal population as well, particularly Métis people. It has the second largest Metis population ratio (second to Prince Albert, Saskatchewan) for any settlements with more than 10,000 residents, at 14.3%. The racial make up is:

Panethnic groups in the Rural Municipality of Taché (2001−2021)
Panethnic group	2021		2016		2011		2006		2001	
Panethnic group	Pop.	%	Pop.	%	Pop.	%	Pop.	%	Pop.	%
European (Note: Statistic includes all persons that did not make up part of a visible minority or an indigenous identity.)	9,310	78.33%	9,385	81.36%	8,450	82.4%	7,930	87.29%	7,750	90.38%
Indigenous	2,105	17.71%	1,870	16.21%	1,590	15.5%	1,025	11.28%	675	7.87%
African	220	1.85%	100	0.87%	110	1.07%	65	0.72%	55	0.64%
Middle Eastern (Note: Statistic includes total responses of "West Asian" and "Arab" under visible minority section on census.)	80	0.67%	10	0.09%	0	0%	10	0.11%	65	0.76%
Southeast Asian (Note: Statistic includes total responses of "Filipino" and "Southeast Asian" under visible minority section on census.)	65	0.55%	70	0.61%	25	0.24%	10	0.11%	10	0.12%
Latin American	35	0.29%	15	0.13%	0	0%	10	0.11%	0	0%
South Asian	25	0.21%	40	0.35%	0	0%	25	0.28%	10	0.12%
East Asian (Note: Statistic includes total responses of "Chinese", "Korean", and "Japanese" under visible minority section on census.)	20	0.17%	15	0.13%	20	0.2%	15	0.17%	25	0.29%
Other/multiracial (Note: Statistic includes total responses of "Visible minority, n.i.e." and "Multiple visible minorities" under visible minority section on census.)	10	0.08%	45	0.39%	10	0.1%	0	0%	0	0%
Total responses	11,885	99.74%	11,535	99.71%	10,255	99.72%	9,085	100.02%	8,575	99.97%
Total population	11,916	100%	11,568	100%	10,284	100%	9,083	100%	8,578	100%
Note: Totals greater than 100% due to multiple origin responses

Religiously speaking, most of the residents either practice a form of Christianity (71.4%) or have no religious affiliation at all (27.7%).

== Water ==
The R.M. of Taché operates water services out of two separate locations — Lorette and Landmark.

In 2005 the R.M. had issued a boil water advisory due to the poor quality of water coming from the well due to the well and infrastructure reaching end of life. In 2009 the R.M. had received approval to for a $5.3 million Lorette Water Supply Project, which included construction of a new well at Lorette, a 1 megalitre underground Reservoir, and new distribution infrastructure.

== See also ==
- List of francophone communities in Manitoba
