= East Reserve =

Coordinates: 49.5516°N 96.6871°W

- block settlement
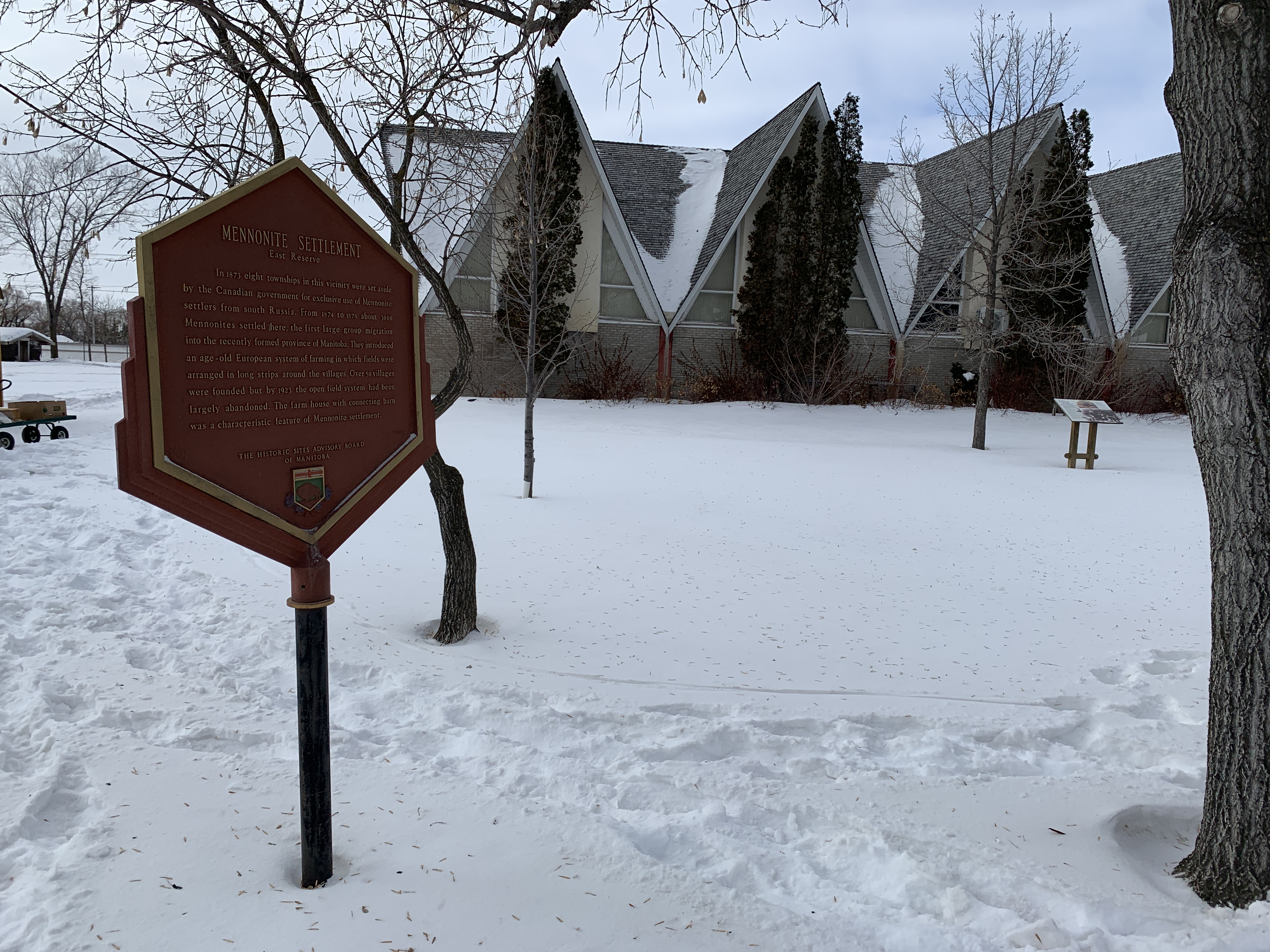
- East Reserve marker at Mennonite Heritage Village in Steinbach, Manitoba, 2020
- Interactive map of East Reserve
- Country: Canada
- Province: Manitoba
- Region: Eastern Manitoba
- Established: March 3, 1873
- First settled: 1874

Population (1878)
  - Total: 3,000
- Other names: The Mennonite Reserve (1874); Hespeler (1880)
- Fate: Now part of Steinbach and the Rural Municipality of Hanover

The East Reserve was a block settlement in Eastern Manitoba initially set aside by the Government of Canada exclusively for settlement by Russian Mennonite settlers in 1873 (although settlement did not occur until 1874).

Most of the East Reserve's earliest settlers were from the Kleine Gemeinde or Bergthaler Mennonite churches.

Settlers of the East Reserve established over 50 villages, a few of which remain today, including the current-day City of Steinbach, as well as Grunthal, Kleefeld, and Blumenort.

== History ==
After signing Treaty 1 with the Anishinabe and Swampy Cree First Nations in 1871, the Government of Canada sent William Hespeler to Russia to recruit Mennonite farmers to the region of Manitoba, which had just joined Confederation. The first Mennonites to visit the area in 1872 were Bernhard Warkentin and Jacob Yost Shantz, a Swiss Mennonite from Ontario, who wrote a Narrative of a journey to Manitoba, a report which helped convince Russian Mennonites to move to the area.

In 1873, twelve Mennonite delegates from the Russian Empire, toured Manitoba and Kansas. The group looked at various locations in Manitoba, including the western part of the province, but chose the eastern region because of its proximity to Winnipeg.

On March 3, 1873, the Canadian government set aside eight townships in the area for exclusive use of Russian Mennonite settlers, with the area initially being named "The Mennonite Reserve".

Despite inferior farming land compared to Kansas, four delegates, representing the Bergthaler and Kleine Gemeinde churches, decided to recommend their people move to Manitoba because of the guarantees offered by the Canadian government. David Klassen, Jacob Peters, Heinrich Wiebe, and Cornelius Toews signed what they called a Privilegium, or agreement, with the Canadian government outlining religious freedom, military exemption, and land. This land became known as the East Reserve, because it was east of the Red River.

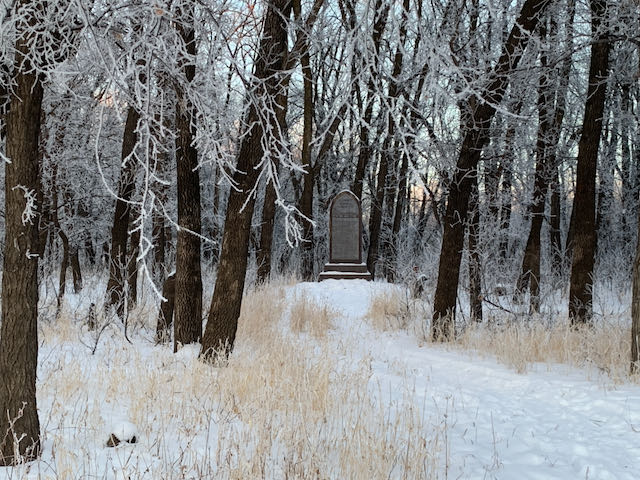
Mennonite settlers landed here at the forks of the Rat and Red River in 1874.

In 1874, Mennonite settlers first arrived in the confluence of the Red River and Rat River and gathered in immigration sheds that Shantz had set up nearby before spreading across the region and selecting numerous village sites. In the years that followed, thousands of Mennonites settled in this area.

The Mennonite settlers established dozens of villages, a few of which remain today, including Steinbach, now an independent municipality, as well as Grunthal, Kleefeld, and Blumenort. The first village settled was Gruenfeld, now Kleefeld, though most of the other villages were settled within months.

The reserve was governed using the system the Mennonites had learned in Prussia. Each village had a Schulz, or mayor, while the whole reserve had an Oberschulz. Delegate Jacob Peters of Vollwerk (now part of Mitchell, Manitoba) was the first oberschulz.

As the home of the Bergthaler Bishop Gerhard Wiebe, the village of Chortitz (now Randolph, Manitoba) quickly became the centre for trade and local government and an unofficial "capital" of the East Reserve, though over time the Kleine Gemeinde village of Steinbach overtook Chortitz in prominence. East Reserve Bergthalers adopted the named Chortitzer Mennonite Conference in 1878.

In 1876, a second larger reserve, called the West Reserve on the west side of the Red River, was established as the land of East Reserve was viewed by many as limited and unsuitable for farming. As such, "The Mennonite Reserve" name was quickly changed to "East Reserve" following this second reserve. A smaller Scratching River settlement was also established in 1875 on the Morris River.

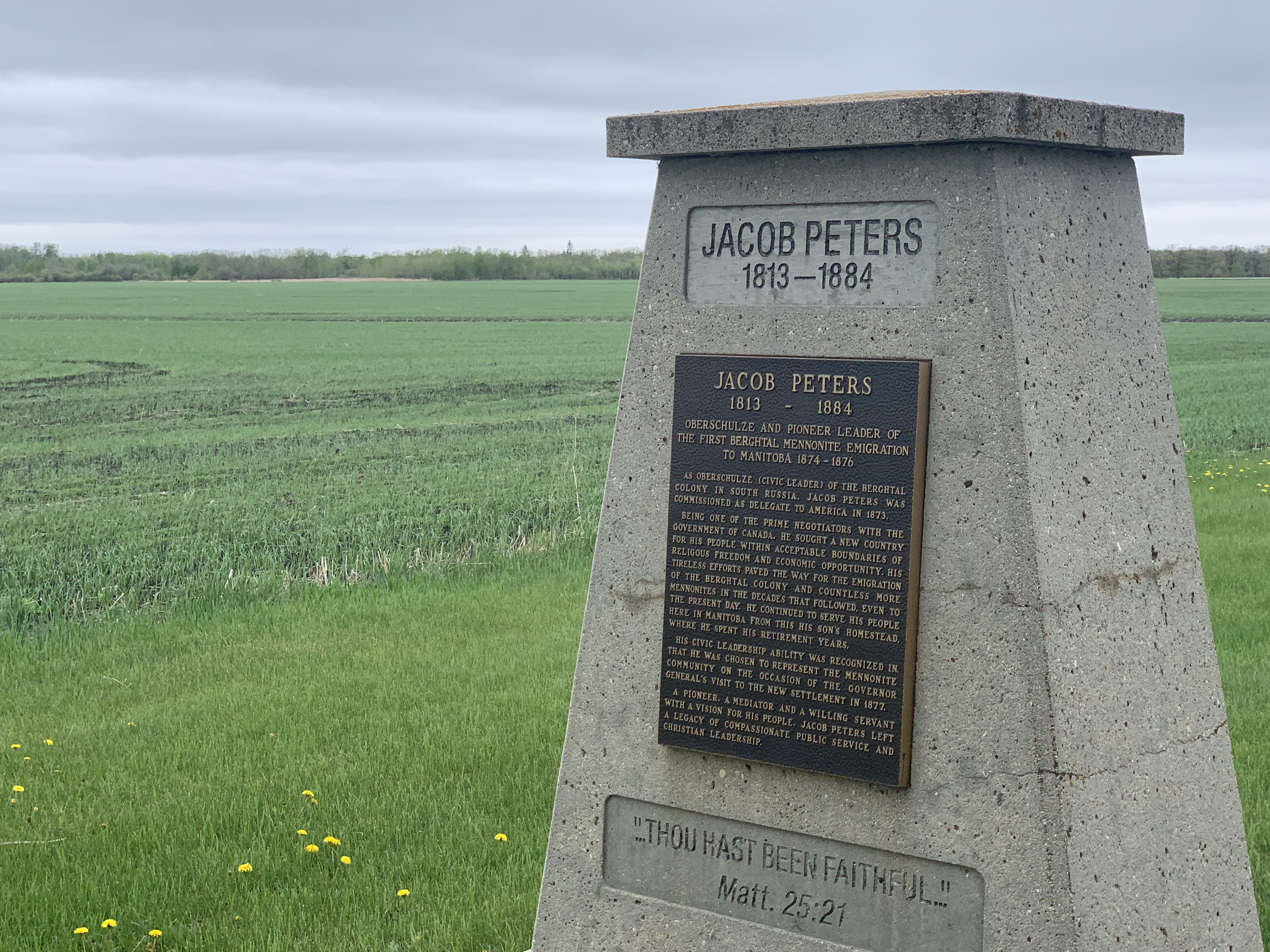
Cairn honouring Jacob Peters, obserschulze of East Reserve, in Mitchell, Manitoba

In 1877, Lord Dufferin visited the Mennonite villages of the East Reserve and, from a rise just west of Steinbach could see "half a dozen villages" in the distance. Lord Dufferin was greeted by Oberschulz Jacob Peters along with more than a 1000 local residents who showed up to greet him.

The East Reserve eventually opened up to settlement from other groups and became known as the Rural Municipality of Hanover. In 1880, the Manitoba government renamed the East Reserve as Hespeler and a year later, in 1881, the reserve was divided between the R.M. of Hespeler, no longer in existence, and the Rural Municipality of Hanover, which is slightly larger than the original East Reserve. By the 1880s, approximately half the population of the East Reserve moved to the West Reserve due to superior soil conditions.

Rather than using open field farming, Mennonites lived in street villages called Strassendorfs, and built housebarns, none of which are extant and in situ in the East Reserve, though two original examples can be seen at the Mennonite Heritage Village in Steinbach. Beginning in 1909, the villages began to be disbanded in favour of open-field farming and by the 1920s no traditional Strassendorfs were left in the region, with some dissolving completely and others, such as Steinbach, evolving into modern communities. Almost 150 years later, the area still retains a significant presence of Mennonites to this day.
