= Giroux, Manitoba =

Human settlement in Manitoba, Canada

Coordinates: 49.575°N 96.569°W

Giroux is an unincorporated community located in the Rural Municipality of Ste. Anne, Manitoba, Canada.

It is located 14 kilometers north-east of Steinbach, and 13 kilometers south-east of Ste. Anne. Originally established as railway stop in the 1890s called "Steinbach Station", it was later renamed Giroux and a small community grew around the station, which provided a key link to Winnipeg for Mennonite, Métis, and French settlers in the area. The rail station closed in the 1950s, but the villages continues to exist with a population of around 100 people.
