= Grunthal, Manitoba =

Grunthal
- Location of Grunthal in Manitoba
- Coordinates: 49°24′24″N 96°51′29″W
- Country: Canada
- Province: Manitoba
- Region: Eastman
- Established: 1876

Government
  - MP (Provencher): Ted Falk (CPC)
  - MLA (La Verendrye): Konrad Narth (PC)

Area
  - Total: 2.70 km^{2} (1.04 sq mi)
- Elevation: 268 m (879 ft)

Population (2021)
  - Total: 1,782
  - Density: 661.2/km^{2} (1,713/sq mi)
  - Change 2016-21: ▲6.1%
- Time zone: UTC-6 (CST)
  - Summer (DST): UTC-5 (CDT)
- Postal code: R0A 0R0
- Website: http://www.grunthal.ca

Grunthal (German: Grünthal, 'Green Valley') is a local urban district in the Rural Municipality of Hanover, Manitoba, located 24 kilometres southwest of Steinbach, and about 50 minutes south of Winnipeg. It had a population of 1,680 in 2016.

Tourist attractions include Grunthal's Annual Fairdays held on the third weekend in August; it features a parade and a rodeo, among other activities. Schools include the K to Grade 4 South Oaks School and the Grades 5 to 12 Green Valley School, all part of the Hanover School Division. Grunthal includes a variety of Mennonite churches, and businesses. Its economy is primarily agrarian-based. Grunthal is also host to one of the best motocross tracks in Manitoba, in past years the track hosted numerous Canadian Motocross National events with the country's top riders coming to race. Grunthal is home to the Grunthal Red Wings, hockey teams ranging from squirts to senior.

== History ==
The area that is now known as Grunthal was originally lands of the nomadic Ojibway-speaking Anishinabe people. On 3 August 1871 the Anishinabe people signed Treaty 1 and moved onto reserves such as the Brokenhead Indian Reserve and Roseau River Anishinabe First Nation Reserve.

The community of Grunthal was settled in 1876 by Plautdietsch-speaking Mennonites immigrants, from Imperial Russia, specifically the Bergthal Colony.

Grunthal was one of dozens of village of what was known as the East Reserve, an area set aside by the Government of Canada for Mennonite settlement, and it is now populated with their descendants, as well as people of Ukrainian and German descent and other ethnicities. The name Grünthal means 'Green Valley' in German, and is called Grientol, (/ˈ jrintol/), in Plautdietsch, with the same meaning.

== Demographics ==
In the 2021 Census of Population conducted by Statistics Canada, Grunthal had a population of 1,782 living in 618 of its 636 total private dwellings, a change of 6.1% from its 2016 population of 1,680. With a land area of 2.69 km^{2} (1.04 sq mi), it had a population density of 662.5/km^{2} (1,715.7/sq mi) in 2021.

== In popular culture ==
Grunthal has inspired literary works by author Jack Thiessen, who grew up nearby, as well as satirist Andrew Unger and poet Chimwemwe Undi. It has also been the subject of historic writing by New Zealand scholar James Urry.

== Notable people ==
- Albert Driedger, politician
- Jack Thiessen, linguist and writer
