= Île-des-Chênes =

- Nickname: Island of Oaks
- Location of Île-des-Chênes in Manitoba.
- Coordinates: 49°42′38″N 96°59′18″W
- Country: Canada
- Province: Manitoba
- Region: Eastman
- Rural Municipality: Ritchot
- Established: 1880s

Government
  - Mayor: Chris Ewen
  - Councillor (Ward 1): Shane Pelletier
  - Governing Body: R.M. of Ritchot Council
  - MP (Provencher): Ted Falk
  - MLA (Springfield-Ritchot): Ron Schuler

Area
  - Total: 1.79 km^{2} (0.69 sq mi)

Population (2021)
  - Total: 1,606
  - Density: 885.5/km^{2} (2,293/sq mi)
- postal code: R0A 0T0

Île-des-Chênes is an unincorporated community in Manitoba, Canada, within the Rural Municipality of Ritchot. The community is located 13 kilometres south-east of the provincial capital Winnipeg, just east of Highway 59. Île-des-Chênes is a French name, translating to Island of the Oaks, coming from a nearby stand of oaks on higher ground, where early settlers sought refuge from the annual spring floodwaters.

== History ==
The first settlers, francophones from Quebec, arrived in the 1880s. The post office was established in 1890 and the local Catholic parish was founded in 1905. Telephone service came to Île-des-Chênes in 1920, but electricity only arrived in 1946. The credit union was established in 1945.

== Demographics ==
In the 2021 Census of Population conducted by Statistics Canada, Iles des Chenes had a population of 1,606 living in 634 of its 657 total private dwellings, a change of 3.9% from its 2016 population of 1,546. With a land area of 2.03 km^{2} (0.78 sq mi), it had a population density of 791.1/km^{2} (2,049.0/sq mi) in 2021.

== Water ==
On 31 August 2000, a boil-water advisory was issued for the Île-des-Chênes community by Manitoba Health after water testing found the water supply well to be contaminated. The next year, a C$6-million program funded through the Canada-Manitoba Infrastructure Program paid for the replacement of the supply pipes, distribution pipes, water treatment plant was undertaken and the project completed in 2002.

== Politics ==
In politics, Île-des-Chênes is located in the ridings of Provencher (federal), represented by Conservative MP Ted Falk and Springfield-Ritchot (provincial), represented by Progressive Conservative MLA Ron Schuler. As well, Île-des-Chênes resides in Ward 1 of the R.M. of Ritchot, represented by Shane Pelletier, who also serves as deputy mayor. Chris Ewen is currently mayor, after having been elected in a by-election in 2017 and acclaimed in the 2018 election.

== Hockey ==
The community is home to the Île-des-Chênes North Stars ice hockey team, which captured the Allan Cup national senior men's championship in 2003.
