= St. Malo, Manitoba =

Coordinates: 49°19′02″N 96°56′56″W

St. Malo
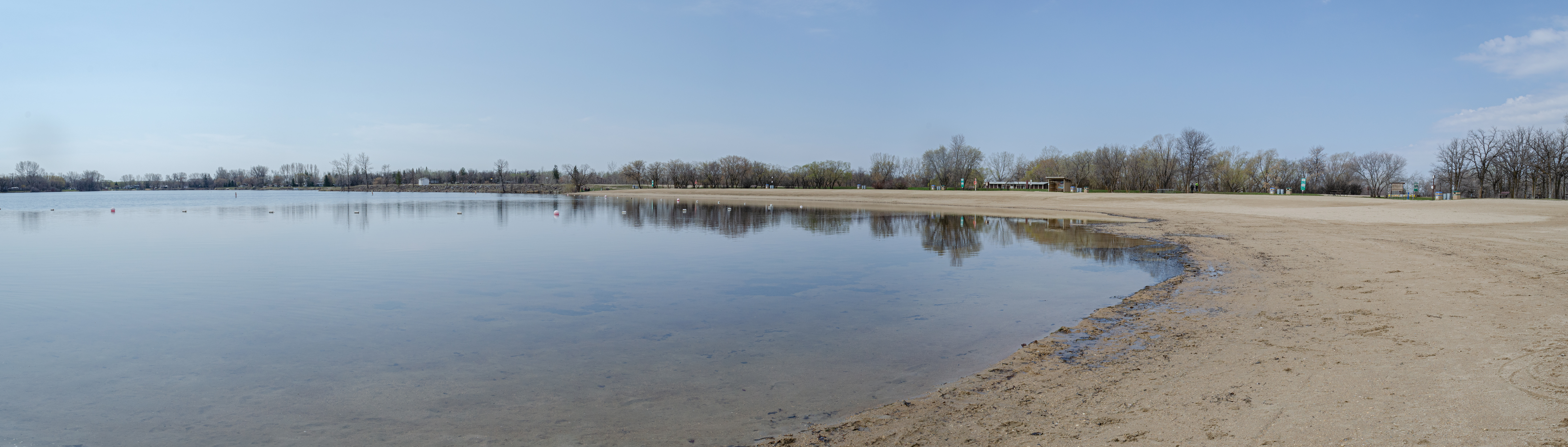
- St. Malo Provincial Park and a number of privately-owned campgrounds are located near the community.
- Interactive map of St. Malo
- Country: Canada
- Province: Manitoba
- RM: De Salaberry
- Established: 1877

Government
  - Type: Local urban district (L.U.D.)

Area
  - Total: 7.34 km^{2} (2.83 sq mi)
- Elevation.(St Malo & Bourgeois): 252 m (827 ft)

Population (2016)
  - Total: 1,227
  - Density: 167/km^{2} (430/sq mi)
- Time zone: UTC-6 (CST)
  - Summer (DST): UTC-5 (CDT)
- Postal code: ROA 1T0
- Area code: 204

St. Malo is a local urban district located in the Rural Municipality of De Salaberry, approximately 70 km south of The Forks, Winnipeg, Manitoba, Canada. Most of the community's residents are bilingual francophone of Métis or Québécois heritage.

== Early history ==
Chronology of the early settlement of St. Malo:

- 1877 — Born in Varennes, Quebec, Louis Malo is the first pioneer to settle in St. Malo.
- 1878 — Opening of the Pembina Branch rail line from St. Boniface to Dominion City through nearby Dufrost station. The new rail route resulted in the phasing-out of the generations-old Crow Wing Ox Trail through St. Malo; Dufrost became part of St. Malo parish.
- 1884 — Surveying of the St. Malo Settlement of lots along the Rat River (a tributary of the Red River) from the southern edge of the village of St. Malo to La Rochelle.
- 1892 — Opening of register for the St. Malo parish of the Manitoban archdiocese of St. Boniface. St. Malo Post Office established 1 February 1892.
- 1977 - On July 18, a violent F4 tornado ripped through the community, killing three and destroying several houses. Asphalt was peeled off of highway roads.

== Geography ==
St. Malo lies in the eastern edge of the remarkably flat Red River flood plain, which was once the lake shore of Lake Agassiz at the transition between southeastern Manitoba's upland woodlands to the east and the flat prairie grasslands to the west.

== Demographics ==
In the 2021 Census of Population conducted by Statistics Canada, St. Malo had a population of 1,323 living in 492 of its 563 total private dwellings, a change of 7.8% from its 2016 population of 1,227. With a land area of 6.91 km^{2} (2.67 sq mi), it had a population density of 191.5/km^{2} (495.9/sq mi) in 2021.

== Amenities ==
St. Malo is a shopping and services centre for the surrounding rural area; it is also recognized for its tourist attractions and farming.

Popular activities in St. Malo during the winter months include snowmobiling, cross-country skiing, hockey, as well as ice-fishing and car racing on the lake. In February 2008, the Friends of the Park ("Les Amis du Parc") organized its first annual Festival of Friends ("Festival des Amis").

École Saint-Malo School is the community's elementary and middle school and is part of the Red River Valley School Division. The school offers both French Immersion and English programs.

== Notable people ==
- Travis Hamonic, NHL player
- Daniel Joseph Marion, politician

== See also ==
- Red River Trails

== Friendship communities ==
- Rural Municipality of De Salaberry, Manitoba, Canada
- Community of La Rochelle, Manitoba, Canada
- Village of Saint-Pierre-Jolys, Manitoba, Canada
- Village of Saint-Malo, Quebec, Canada
- Port city of Saint-Malo, Brittany, France

== Bibliography ==
- Census Profile, 2016 Census (online). "St. Malo, Local urban district".
- Canada. Dept. of the Interior (1890). "Annual Report of the Department of the Interior for the Fiscal Year 1890".
- L&A Canada (online). "Library and Archives Canada, Post Offices and Postmasters". Library and Archives Canada.
- Parks Canada (2008). "Manitoba History: Commemorating the First Railway in Western Canada". Manitoba Historical Society.
- The De Salaberry-St Pierre Heritage Advisory Committee (online). "Landmarks: Significant Heritage Buildings of De Salaberry and St. Pierre" (PDF).
- Ledohowski (pdf 1), E.M. (2003). "The Heritage Landscape of the Crow Wing Study Region of Southeastern Manitoba - Introduction" (PDF).
- Ledohowski (pdf 3), E.M. (2003). "The Heritage Landscape of the Crow Wing Study Region of Southeastern Manitoba - Settlement Groups" (PDF).
- Malo, Jean-Pierre (2015). Olivier, Réjean (ed.). Les Hayet (Ayet) dit Malo de la rive-nord: forts et fertiles!. Collection Oeuvres bibliophiliques de Lanaudière (in French) (Private ed.). ISBN 978-2-924448-52-6. 68 pages, L&A Canada link
- Manitoba LUDR (online). "Local Urban Districts Regulation". Government of Manitoba.
- PRDH (online). "List of the pioneers, Jean-Baptiste Ayet-Malo". Programme de recherche en démographie historique (Research Program in Historical Demography), Montreal University.
- Manitoba Historical Society (online). "Historic Sites of Manitoba: St. Malo Grotto (RM of DeSalaberry)".
- Rivers West (online). "Routes of the Red, Shores of Lake Agassiz" (PDF). Red River Corridor Inc.
- SHSB (1940). Saint-Malo: paroisse manitobaine. Saint-Boniface, Man.: Société historique de Saint-Boniface / Peel Library, University of Alberta.
- Livre du centenaire de la paroisse Saint-Malo (1994). Saint-Malo, Dufrost, La Rochelle: À l'ombre de nos clochers.
- Therrien, Joanne (2007). Saint-Malo : la beauté de la nature / St. Malo : nature's beauty. Winnipeg: Vidacom. ISBN 978-2-923653-03-7.
- Worldwide Elevation Map Finder (online). "Saint Malo, MB R0A 1T0, Canada".
