= Kleefeld, Manitoba =

Kleefeld
- Local urban district
- Nickname: Honey Capital of Manitoba
- Motto(s): Land of Milk and Honey
- Location of Kleefeld in Manitoba
- Coordinates: 49°30′05″N 96°52′29″W
- Country: Canada
- Province: Manitoba
- Region: Eastman
- Rural Municipality: Hanover
- Established: 1874

Government
  - Governing body: R.M. of Hanover
  - MP (Provencher): Ted Falk (CPC)
  - MLA (La Verendrye): Konrad Narth (PC)

Area
  - Total: 3.1 km^{2} (1.21 sq mi)
- Elevation: 268 m (879 ft)

Population
  - Estimate (2021): 1,904
- Time zone: UTC-6 (CST)
  - Summer (DST): UTC-5 (CDT)
- Postal Code: R0A 0V0
- Website: Kleefeld.ca

Kleefeld (/ˈklifɛld/; German pronunciation: [ˈkleːfɛlt]; German: clover field, Plautdietsch: Kleefelt /ˈklɔɪ̯fɛlt/) is a local urban district located in the Rural Municipality of Hanover, Manitoba, Canada.

It was settled in 1874, the first Mennonite settlement in Western Canada, and was originally called Gruenfeld (German: Grünfeld, 'green field').

== History ==
The area now known as Kleefeld was originally lands of the nomadic Ojibway-speaking Anishinabe people. On 3 August 1871, the Anishinabe people signed Treaty 1 and moved onto reserves such as the Brokenhead Indian Reserve and Roseau River Anishinabe First Nation Reserve. The East Reserve was established in 1873 after delegates from Imperial Russia were persuaded by William Hespeler to immigrate to Canada rather than the United States. The delegates signed the Privilegium with the Canadian government that guaranteed religious freedom, military exemption, private schools, and land. Mennonite settlers began to arrive a year later, and Gruenfeld, now Kleefeld, was the first Mennonite settlement in Western Canada. The original settlers of Gruenfeld, neighbouring Steinbach, and Blumenort were Mennonites of the Kleine Gemeinde denomination, fleeing religious persecution in Imperial Russia.

Gruenfeld took its name from a village just north of the Borozenko colony in southern Russia, which was the original home for many settlers. It was initially settled in 1874 by 16 families and surrounded by six smaller satellite communities – Heuboden, Schoenau, Rosenfeld, Blumenfeld, Steinreich and Hochstadt – each with populations ranging from two to eighteen inhabitants. In 1877, Lord Dufferin visited the Mennonite communities of Manitoba and stopped near Gruenfeld, where he viewed "half a dozen villages" in the distance. More than 1,000 people came to greet his arrival.

The community's name slowly changed in 1896 thanks to Peter W. Reimer, the first postmaster. The name of Kleefeld was chosen for the post office to avoid confusion as Gruenfeld mail was being routinely sent to another community in western Canada named Grenfell. He was likely influenced by his choice of the ancestral Reimer family village in Molotschna, Russia, also named Kleefeld.

The community of Gruenfeld originally existed one mile north of Kleefeld's present location in what is now a farmer's field. The original cemetery and several buildings, most notably an old gas station, still stand on the original roadway but most of the community has long since disappeared beneath the earth. The original village failed to grow and by 1896 only three original settlers remained in the village. The village concept did not catch on with the children of the original settlers who preferred more isolated farms.

In 1903, the village council decided to disband the village and within the next five years the few remaining homes were moved to nearby farm properties. However several businesses remained near the Gruenfeld School at the south end of the settlement. These businesses were the Fast Blacksmith Shop, Barkman general store, Wiebe general store and the Kleefeld post office.

The present location of the community was influenced largely by J. R. Schellenberg, who purchased the Wiebe general store in 1924 and moved it one mile south to its current location in Kleefeld. A few years later the Co-op cheese factory was built and in 1940, Jacob Koop opened a blacksmith shop. When H. L. Fast retired as blacksmith and postmaster in 1947 the Kleefeld post office was moved from the original settlement of Gruenfeld to the J.R. Schellenberg store, bringing the name of Kleefeld along with it. As time passed and houses were built, moved or abandoned, residents who did not farm chose to live near their places of work or at least near to services, so the community moved. The last use of the name Gruenfeld disappeared in 1962 when the Gruenfeld and Hochstadt school districts were amalgamated into the Consolidated School district of Cloverfield. In 1973, a school was constructed in the present community, and the old school house at the south end of Gruenfeld was finally retired.

Presently only the EMC (Kleine Gemeinde) and Church of God in Christ (Holdeman) churches remain near the original site of the community.

With the recent trend toward "country lots" the area around the churches and original community is now more populous than it ever was during the life of the original village with 44 homes located on the same square mile.

Kleefeld was organized as a local urban district within the R.M. of Hanover in 2022.

== Residents ==
Kleefeld was and is home to a mainly Mennonite population, although the recent population growth has brought in many families of other ethnic or religious backgrounds. Due to its proximity to Winnipeg and Steinbach, most of the population commutes to work. Some main industries are woodworking, cabinetry, farming, sauna sales, and large diesel repair. The community has a central park, which includes tennis courts, playground, baseball and soccer fields, a hockey rink and large skating oval in the winter. The rink is turned into a skate park for the summer, and they are currently raising funds for new playground equipment, a toboggan slide and other park upgrades. There is a K–9 public school (453 students in 2009–2010) with students bused from neighboring countryside. There is a local volunteer fire department. On the second weekend of August, Kleefeld holds its annual Honey Festival.

== Notable people ==
- Robb Nash Project, Bobby Reimer of the Robb Nash band
- The Undecided, Matt Fast, lead singer of The Undecided

== In literature ==
- Fast, Henry: Gruenfeld: First Mennonite Village in Western Canada (ISBN 0-9782038-0-1) (2006)
- Friesen, Ronald: Gruenfeld Chronicles (ISBN 1550991310) (2002)
- Friesen, Ronald: John R. and Maria Friesen: Kleefeld Pilgrims of a Mennonite Tradition (ISBN 0921002173) (1999)
- Friesen, Louella: "Great is God's Faithfulness" (1999)
- Dueck, Cornelius B: "40 Years in the Land of Milk and Honey" (1997)
