= Sperling, Manitoba =

Sperling
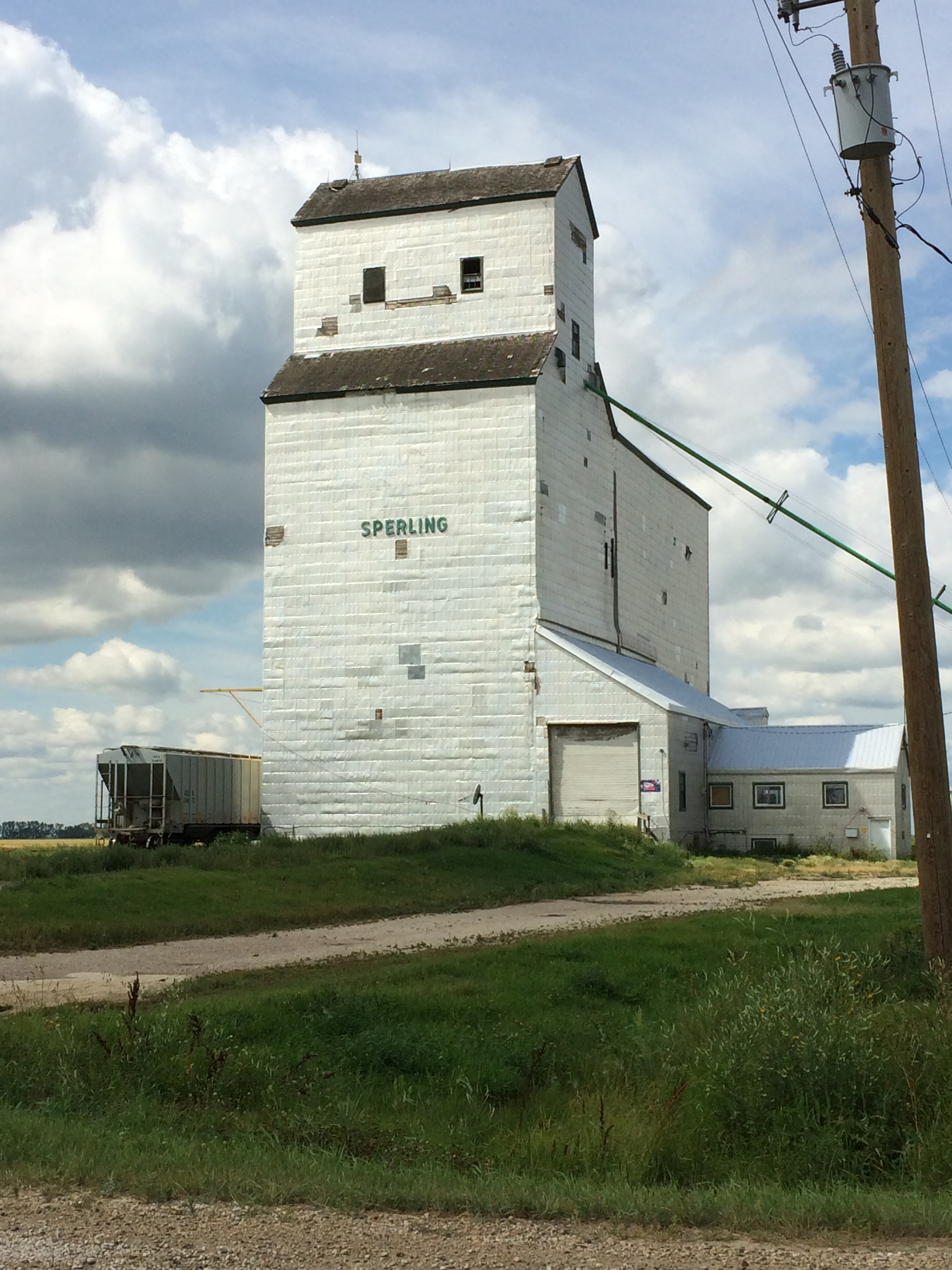
- Grain Elevator at Sperling (Demolished 2015)

- Location of Sperling in Manitoba
- Coordinates: 49°30′29″N 97°42′17″W
- Country: Canada
- Province: Manitoba
- Region: Pembina Valley
- Census Division: No. 3

Government
  - Governing Body: Rural Municipality of Morris Council
  - MP: Candice Hoeppner
  - MLA: Lauren Stone
- Time zone: UTC−6 (CST)
  - Summer (DST): UTC−5 (CDT)
- Postal Code: R0G 2M0
- Area code: 204
- NTS Map: 062H12
- GNBC Code: GBACH

Sperling is an unincorporated community in south central Manitoba, Canada. It is located on Provincial Trunk Highway 3 approximately 56 kilometers (36 miles) southwest of Winnipeg, Manitoba in the Rural Municipality of Morris.
