= Rural Municipality of De Salaberry =

Rural municipality in Manitoba, Canada

De Salaberry
- Rural municipality
- Rural Municipality of De Salaberry
- Location of De Salaberry in Manitoba
- Coordinates: 49.353°N 97.063°W
- Country: Canada
- Province: Manitoba
- Region: Eastman
- Incorporated: December 22, 1883
- Named for: Charles de Salaberry

Area
  - Total: 667.57 km^{2} (257.75 sq mi)

Population (2021)
  - Total: 3,918
  - Density: 5.869/km^{2} (15.20/sq mi)
- Area codes: Area codes 204 and 431
- Website: www.rmdesalaberry.mb.ca

De Salaberry (French: Municipalité rurale De Salaberry) is a rural municipality in the province of Manitoba in western Canada. The administratively separate village of St-Pierre-Jolys and St. Malo Provincial Park lie within the geographical borders of the municipality. The municipality is named after Charles de Salaberry.

== Communities ==
- Carey
- Dufrost
- La Rochelle
- Otterburne
- St-Pierre-Jolys
- St-Malo

== Demographics ==
In the 2021 Census of Population conducted by Statistics Canada, De Salaberry had a population of 3,918 living in 1,191 of its 1,295 total private dwellings, a change of 9.4% from its 2016 population of 3,580. With a land area of 667.57 km^{2} (257.75 sq mi), it was sparsely populated, with a population density of 5.9/km^{2} (15.2/sq mi) in 2021.

== See also ==
- List of francophone communities in Manitoba
