= Rural Municipality of Hanover =

Rural municipality in Manitoba, Canada

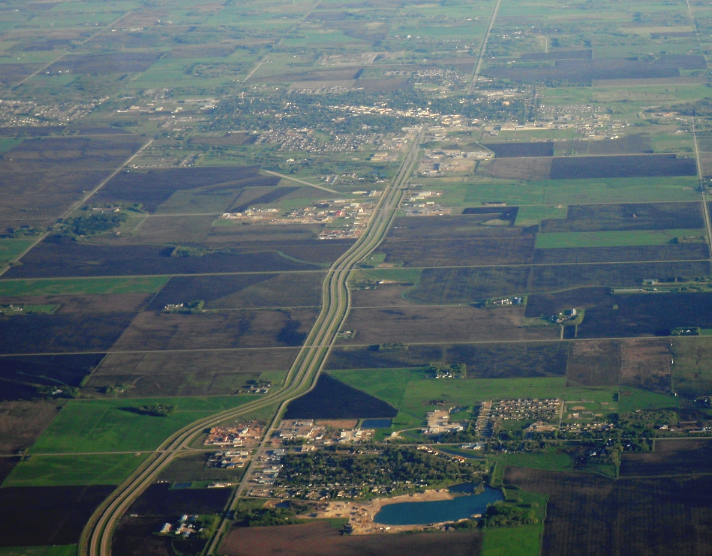
- Steinbach (upper) and Blumenort (lower) as seen from the air.

- The Location of the RM of Hanover in Manitoba
- Coordinates: 49°26′36″N 96°50′57″W
- Country: Canada
- Province: Manitoba
- Region: Eastman
- Incorporated: May 25, 1881
- Amalgamated: 1890

Government
  - Reeve: Jim Funk

Area
  - Total: 730.44 km^{2} (282.02 sq mi)
- Elevation: 268 m (879 ft)

Population (2021 Census)
  - Total: 17,216
  - Density: 23.6/km^{2} (61/sq mi)
- Time zone: UTC-6 (CST)
  - Summer (DST): UTC-5 (CDT)
- Website: http://www.hanovermb.ca/

The Rural Municipality of Hanover is a rural municipality (RM) in southeastern Manitoba, Canada, located southeast of Winnipeg in Division No. 2.

It is Manitoba's most populous rural municipality and fourth-most populous municipality overall (behind the cities of Winnipeg, Brandon, and Steinbach) as of the 2021 census.

== History ==
The area of Hanover was part of the traditional lands of the Ojibway-speaking natives. In the summer of 1871, the federal government signed treaties with these people and relocated them to reserves such as the Roseau River Anishinabe First Nation to the south and the Brokenhead Ojibway Nation to the north. The Manitoba government set aside the East Reserve, slightly smaller than what is now the RM of Hanover, from the lands left behind for Plautdietsch-speaking Mennonites immigrants from the Russian Empire. In 1873, these Mennonites signed an agreement with the Canadian government known as the Privilegium, which guaranteed land, freedom of religion, private schools, and military exemption.

The East Reserve was divided into two municipalities in the early 1880s, as most of the southern Manitoba was organizing itself into new rural municipalities. In 1880, the north part of the East Reserve became the Rural Municipality of Hespeler, named in honour of William Hespeler, who had brought many of the Mennonite immigrants to the area. The RM of Hanover, to the south, was established on 25 May 1881. The two municipalities shared administrative staff and merged into the single municipality of Hanover in 1890.

Other settlers in the area were mainly French and Anglo-Saxons.

The neighbouring city of Steinbach and town of Niverville were originally within Hanover but have since become separate urban municipalities. Steinbach was incorporated (as a Town) in 1946 and Niverville in 1969. These three municipalities now have a combined population of over 40,000 residents. Hanover's municipal headquarters were located in Steinbach until a new office building near Mitchell was constructed in 2001.

== Demographics ==
Hanover is the province's most populated rural municipality, ahead of the Rural Municipality of Springfield, and fourth-most populated municipality overall, slightly behind the City of Steinbach. In the 2021 Census of Population conducted by Statistics Canada, Hanover had a population of 17,216 living in 5,141 of its 5,305 total private dwellings, a change of 10.8% from its 2016 population of 15,540. With a land area of 730.44 km^{2} (282.02 sq mi), it had a population density of 23.6/km^{2} (61.0/sq mi) in 2021. The largest communities in Hanover are the local urban districts of Mitchell, Grunthal and Blumenort, which have populations of 2,828, 1,782 and 1,778, respectively.

Historical population

Year	Pop.	±%
1881	1,000	—
1891	2,300	+130.0%
1896	2,614	+13.7%
1901	3,438	+31.5%
1911	3,884	+13.0%
1921	4,795	+23.5%
1931	5,833	+21.6%
1941	8,190	+40.4%
1951	6,570	−19.8%
1956	6,696	+1.9%
1961	6,771	+1.1%
1966	6,739	−0.5%

Year	Pop.	±%
1971	6,237	−7.4%
1976	6,645	+6.5%
1981	7,428	+11.8%
1986	8,033	+8.1%
1991	8,905	+10.9%
1996	9,833	+10.4%
2001	10,789	+9.7%
2006	11,871	+10.0%
2011	14,026	+18.2%
2016	15,540	+10.8%
2021	17,216	+10.8%

Panethnic groups in the Rural Municipality of Hanover (2001−2021)
Panethnic group	2021		2016		2011		2006		2001	
Panethnic group	Pop.	%	Pop.	%	Pop.	%	Pop.	%	Pop.	%
European (Note: Statistic includes all persons that did not make up part of a visible minority or an indigenous identity.)	14,915	87.07%	14,440	92.21%	13,015	93.4%	11,455	96.95%	10,460	97.71%
Indigenous	1,410	8.23%	995	6.35%	740	5.31%	305	2.58%	185	1.73%
Southeast Asian (Note: Statistic includes total responses of "Filipino" and "Southeast Asian" under visible minority section on census.)	265	1.55%	25	0.16%	15	0.11%	0	0%	0	0%
African	220	1.28%	105	0.67%	45	0.32%	35	0.3%	10	0.09%
Latin American	95	0.55%	50	0.32%	55	0.39%	15	0.13%	15	0.14%
South Asian	65	0.38%	10	0.06%	35	0.25%	10	0.08%	10	0.09%
East Asian (Note: Statistic includes total responses of "Chinese", "Korean", and "Japanese" under visible minority section on census.)	45	0.26%	20	0.13%	15	0.11%	0	0%	30	0.28%
Middle Eastern (Note: Statistic includes total responses of "West Asian" and "Arab" under visible minority section on census.)	45	0.26%	10	0.06%	0	0%	0	0%	0	0%
Other/multiracial (Note: Statistic includes total responses of "Visible minority, n.i.e." and "Multiple visible minorities" under visible minority section on census.)	20	0.12%	10	0.06%	0	0%	0	0%	0	0%
Total responses	17,130	99.5%	15,660	99.54%	13,935	99.35%	11,815	99.53%	10,705	99.22%
Total population	17,216	100%	15,733	100%	14,026	100%	11,871	100%	10,789	100%
Note: Totals greater than 100% due to multiple origin responses

== Transportation ==
Hanover is served by three provincial highways: PTH 52, PTH 12, and PTH 59; the latter two link the municipality with the City of Winnipeg, the provincial capital. There are no major rivers or rail lines running through Hanover; however, the Canadian Pacific Railway's Emerson subdivision forms a portion of the municipality's boundary with the Rural Municipality of Ritchot.

The Steinbach South Airport is a privately-run airport located within municipal boundaries near Steinbach.

== Communities ==
Local urban districts

- Blumenort
- Grunthal
- Kleefeld
- Mitchell
- New Bothwell

Other communities

- Barkfield
- Blumenhoff
- Bristol
- Friedensfeld
- Hochstadt
- Pansy
- Randolph
- Rosengard
- Sarto
- Tourond
