= Landmark, Manitoba =

Landmark
- Unincorporated community
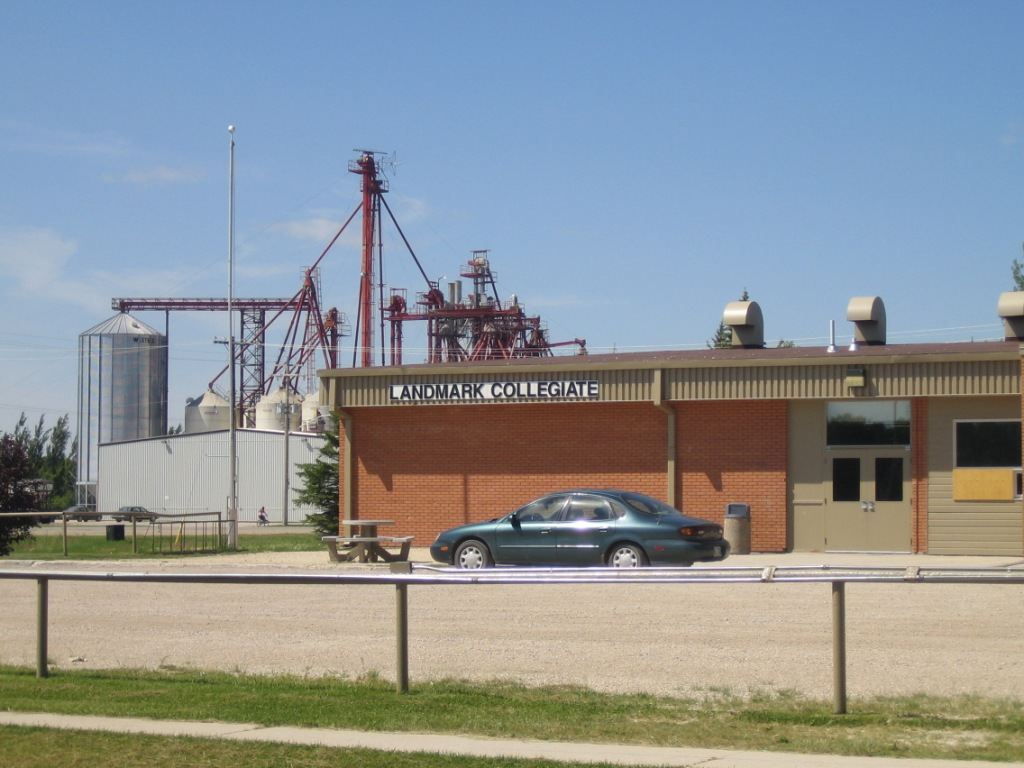
- Landmark high school with Landmark Feeds in the background
- Interactive map of Landmark
- Coordinates: 49°40′18″N 96°49′18″W
- Settled: 1907

Area
  - Total: 2.98 km^{2} (1.15 sq mi)
- Elevation: 242 m (794 ft)

Population (2021)
  - Total: 1,326
  - Density: 445/km^{2} (1,150/sq mi)
- Postal Code: R0A 0X0
- Area codes: 204, 431

Landmark, originally called Prairie Rose, is a local urban district in the Rural Municipality of Taché, Manitoba, Canada, located about 30 km (18.6 mi) southeast of the provincial capital, Winnipeg. Landmark's population as of the 2021 census was 1,326. The community lies on the longitudinal centre of Canada.

== History ==
Although at least four homesteads were established in about 1907, much of the area was barren until just after World War I. It was at this time that a number of Mennonite families living in the neighbouring East Reserve faced shortages of land for agricultural expansion. By 1920, a dozen Mennonite families had purchased land in the area and had begun establishing their new farms. Within a year of that, the area had its first church building, and by 1925 a school district had been organized.

The main transportation link in the Landmark area in the early years was the Old Dawson Trail, a crude road that led westward to Winnipeg and eastward to Ste. Anne.

In about 1920, the east part of the area of Prairie Rose was registered as the name "Landmark", being picked at random from a list of names in the "Farmer's Advocate" by early resident Peter M. Penner and his eldest son.

Numerous businesses sprung up in Landmark in the 1950s. One of the first businesses in the Landmark area, a repair shop named Landmark Motors, opened in 1950, followed the next year by the Landmark General Store. Landmark’s largest business, a livestock and poultry feed supplier called Landmark Feeds Inc, was established in 1954. In 1957, a plumbing and heating business opened, followed a year later by a second repair shop, Lincoln Sales & Service (now Giesbrecht Mechanical).

In 1961, Landmark Collegiate Institute opened in Landmark, largely due to the efforts of local farmer and businessman John J Hildebrand. He worked tirelessly to promote Landmark as the location of the new school, rather than on the prairie between several population centres.

== Demographics ==
According to the 2021 census conducted by Statistics Canada, Landmark had a population of 1,326 living in 458 of its 474 total private dwellings, a change of 2.6% from its 2016 population of 1,292. With a land area of 2.97 km^{2} (1.15 sq mi), it had a population density of 446.5/km^{2} (1,156.3/sq mi) in 2021.

== Economy ==
While Landmark is predominantly a farming community, with many dairy, hog, poultry, and grain farming operations, it offers a number of services. These include a gift shop and ceramic painting studio, livestock and poultry feed supplier, a swine management company with a truck and trailer wash, a credit union, a post office, insurance company, fire hall, youth centre, an arena, a new Kinsmen rec centre, and baseball diamond, two repair garages, one restaurant, a convenience store and gas station, as well as two schools (K–6) and (7–12), and four churches. Landmark lies in an area with rich black soil known to yield fine crops. Situated in a low-lying area, the community relies on drainage provided by the constructed Seine River Diversion to minimize flooding caused by the spring melt.

== Notable people ==
- Sarah Ens, poet
- Don Plett, senator
- Al Reimer, writer
