= Rosenort, Manitoba =

Coordinates: 49°27′31″N 97°26′03″W

Rosenort, Manitoba, is an unincorporated community recognized as a local urban district within the Rural Municipality of Morris about 17 kilometres from the town of Morris and about 47 kilometres south of Winnipeg.

Rosenort is named after a Mennonite village in Imperial Russia, meaning 'Rose Garden' in German. A post office was located on 32-5-1E and was opened in 1899. Rosenort has a K-12 school that is a part of the Red River Valley School Division.

Rosenort was established in 1874 after David Klassen, a Kleine Gemeinde Mennonite delegate and signer of the Privilegium decided to establish a settlement along what is now called the Morris River rather than settle in the nearby East Reserve. The area became known the Scratching River Settlement. The community was settled by 31 Plautdietsch-speaking families of Mennonites of Dutch descent, who came from the Molotschna colony in the Russian Empire, whose descendants continue to have a significant presence in the community.

== Demographics ==
In the 2021 Census of Population conducted by Statistics Canada, Rosenort had a population of 798 living in 275 of its 283 total private dwellings, a change of 13.8% from its 2016 population of 701. With a land area of 10.54 km^{2} (4.07 sq mi), it had a population density of 75.7/km^{2} (196.1/sq mi) in 2021.

== Notable people ==
- Jordan Peters, curler
