= Rural Municipality of Morris =

Rural municipality in Manitoba, Canada

- Rural municipality
- Location of the RM of Morris in Manitoba
- Coordinates: 49°23′55″N 97°27′33″W
- Country: Canada
- Province: Manitoba
- Region: Pembina Valley

Area
  - Land: 1,038.32 km^{2} (400.90 sq mi)

Population (2016)
  - Total: 3,047
- Time zone: UTC-6 (CST)
  - Summer (DST): UTC-5 (CDT)
- Area codes: 204 and 431
- Website: rmofmorris.ca

Morris is a rural municipality (RM) in the province of Manitoba in Western Canada. The town of Morris, a separate urban municipality, is located in the southeastern corner of the RM.

The RM has a population of 3,047 persons as of the 2016 Canada Census.

== History ==
In 1891, the subdistrict of Morris had a population of 739.

== Communities ==
- Aubigny
- Kane
- Lowe Farm
- McTavish
- Riverside is a small hamlet located between the town of Morris and the community of Rosenort, it is 45 kilometres (28 mi) southwest of the city of Winnipeg. The Morris River passes through the community on its western side. The hamlet is the site of the Riverside Centennial Park.
- Rosenort
- Sewell
- Silver Plains
- Sperling
- Union Point

== Demographics ==
In the 2021 Census of Population conducted by Statistics Canada, Morris had a population of 3,049 living in 923 of its 992 total private dwellings, a change of 0.1% from its 2016 population of 3,047. With a land area of 1,035.32 km^{2} (399.74 sq mi), it had a population density of 2.9/km^{2} (7.6/sq mi) in 2021.

== See also ==
- List of francophone communities in Manitoba
