= St-Pierre-Jolys =

- Village
- Nickname: St-Pierre
- Village boundaries

- Location of St. Pierre-Jolys in Manitoba
- Coordinates: 49°26′25″N 96°59′04″W
- Country: Canada
- Province: Manitoba
- Region: Eastman
- Founded: 1877
- Incorporated: January 4, 1947

Government
  - City Mayor: Elizabeth Karpinchick
  - MP (Provencher): Ted Falk
  - MLA: Konrad Narth

Area
  - Total: 2.66 km^{2} (1.03 sq mi)
- Elevation: 242 m (795 ft)

Population (2016)
  - Total: 1,170
  - Density: 440.5/km^{2} (1,141/sq mi)
- Time zone: UTC-6 (CST)
  - Summer (DST): UTC-5 (CDT)
- Website: villagestpierrejolys.ca

St-Pierre-Jolys (formerly Rivière-aux-Rats/Rat River, St-Pierre/St. Pierre) is a village in the Canadian province of Manitoba, located 50 km (31 mi) southeast of Winnipeg on Highway 59 near the Rat River. It is surrounded by the Rural Municipality of De Salaberry, and the nearest communities to it are Steinbach, St. Malo, Morris and Niverville.

Agriculture is the dominant industry: primarily dairy farming and livestock. Being important sectors for the life of the community, the local businesses, services, and hospitality are strong.

Tourism is also important to the village: the former Crow Wing Trail is now part of the Trans-Canada Trail, and St. Pierre-Jolys hosts several popular festivals, such as la Cabane à Sucre (maple syrup festival) in April; le Festival Chantecler, a celebration of Francophone arts; and the signature St-Pierre-Jolys Frog Follies and Ag Fair (les Folies Grenouilles et Foire Agricoles), a village fair featuring the Canadian frog jumping competition.

There are 2 schools, a hospital, and a sizable Royal Canadian Mounted Police detachment in the village.

Bilingual St-Pierre-Jolys has collaborated with the nearby St. Malo on several ventures, including a trade show and a hockey league.

The dramatic sequences for the 2012 documentary We Were Children were shot there.

== History ==
Part of the 19th-century Crow Wing Trail linking Upper Fort Garry with St. Paul (now MN), the area was initially settled by francophone people of Métis and Québécois heritage. English settlers later came as well, in smaller numbers. Father Noel-Joseph Ritchot and Mr. Joseph Dubuc both helped with St. Pierre's founding. The Brittany-born Father Jean-Marie Jolys started a parish and encouraged many Quebec families to move here. The name "Jolys" was added to "St. Pierre" around 1922 to recognize the 40 years of Father Jolys as parish priest of St. Pierre. The Roman Catholic faith has been inextricably linked to the settlement's growth. A former convent of the Sisters of the Holy Names of Jesus and Mary is now the village museum. Though the post office opened in 1879, St. Pierre-Jolys was only incorporated as a village in 1947.

A unique part of the area's history was the establishment of a POW camp that held German soldiers captured during World War II. Located 6 miles south of St. Pierre in 1943, the camp held about 200 prisoners working on a sugar beet farm.

== Demographics ==
In the 2021 Census of Population conducted by Statistics Canada, St-Pierre-Jolys had a population of 1,305 living in 508 of its 518 total private dwellings, a change of 11.5% from its 2016 population of 1,170. With a land area of 2.61 km^{2} (1.01 sq mi), it had a population density of 500.0/km^{2} (1,295.0/sq mi) in 2021.

Canada census – St-Pierre-Jolys community profile

	2011
Population	1,099 (+31.0% from 2006)
Land area	2.60 km^{2} (1.00 sq mi)
Population density	422.7/km^{2} (1,095/sq mi)
Median age	34.2 (M: 32.3, F: 36.2)
Private dwellings	434 (total)
Median household income

References: 2011

== Notable people ==
- Raymonde Gagné, senator
- Rich Gosselin, hockey player
- Mariette Mulaire, businesswoman

== See also ==
- Franco-Manitoban
- List of francophone communities in Manitoba
