= Ted Falk =

Canadian politician

Ted Falk MP
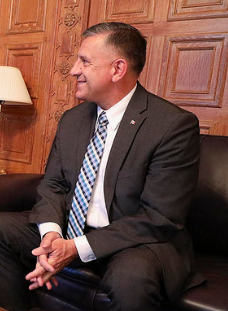

Member of Parliament for Provencher
- Incumbent
- Assumed office November 25, 2013
- Preceded by: Vic Toews

Personal details
- Born: May 23, 1960 (age 66) Winnipeg, Manitoba, Canada
- Party: Conservative

Theodore J. "Ted" Falk MP (born May 23, 1960) is a Canadian politician, who currently represents the electoral district of Provencher, Manitoba, in the House of Commons of Canada. A member of the Conservative Party of Canada, he was first elected in a by-election on November 25, 2013.

== Political career ==
Prior to his election, Falk was the owner of a construction and gravel-crushing company and also served 24 years (16 as president) on the board of the Steinbach Credit Union (SCU), Manitoba's largest credit union.

Falk was first elected as Member of Parliament in the 2013 Provencher by-election, succeeding former cabinet minister Vic Toews, who had retired from politics three months earlier after almost 13 years as the area's MP. Falk was re-elected in the 2015, 2019, and 2021 federal elections.

In February 2016, Falk introduced his first private member’s bill, C-239 An act to amend the Income Tax Act (charitable gifts), or the Fairness in Charitable Gifts Act. The bill called for a correction to be made to the deductibility/refund gap between donations made to charities and those given to political parties. The bill was defeated at second reading in the House.

As MP for Provencher, Falk has served on numerous parliamentary committees. In his first term, under Prime Minister Stephen Harper, he served on Canadian Heritage, Public Accounts, and Public Safety and National Security. In the 42nd Parliament, under interim Conservative leader Rona Ambrose, he was appointed Vice Chair of the Justice Committee where he was the only MP to vote against Bill C-16, An act to amend the Criminal Code of Canada to enshrine gender identity rights. Under newly elected Conservative leader Andrew Scheer, Falk was appointed Deputy Shadow Minister for Employment, Workforce Development and Labour. He was then appointed to the prestigious new National Security and Intelligence Committee of Parliamentarians which does top secret work overseeing Canada’s military and intelligence apparatus. Falk has also served on the Agriculture and Agrifood committee, Natural Resources, Scrutiny of Regulations and Finance.

In 2017, the small community of Emerson, MB in Falk’s riding made international headlines as hundreds of individuals began to cross illegally into Canada from the United States. Falk raised this issue in the House of Commons sparking a fierce debate as to whether they should be considered “refugees, given the safe Third Country Agreement between Canada and the United States—a rule that requires asylum seekers to make their asylum claim in the first of the two countries they reached. Falk argued that many of those crossing at Emerson (and to an even greater extent at Roxham Road in Quebec), were not genuine refugees as many had lived for years in the United States and they were “hedging their bets” given the policies of the incoming Donald Trump administration. He and other Conservative politicians also argued that a tweet by Prime Minister Justin Trudeau that appeared to welcome the migrants to Canada had caused the crisis.

Falk is a staunch social conservative who opposes abortion. The Conservative Party of Canada has no official policy on abortion.

When the first Pride Parade took place in Steinbach in 2016, Falk did not attend, citing other commitments. When pressed, he responded with a statement:

"I've been clear on this issue many times and have made my position public on my values of faith, family and community. I will not be attending the Pride march taking place in Steinbach on July 9, nor do I intend to participate in any other events organized by this group. Just as I respect the right of people to participate in this event, I am hopeful the event organizers will be respectful of my choice, and the choice of many others, not to participate. Even without a scheduling conflict, my decision to not attend would be the same."

During the COVID-19 pandemic, Falk was a strong opponent of public health restrictions, unprecedented government spending, and vaccine mandates. During the 2021 election, Falk was reported to have made erroneous statements about COVID-19 vaccines, for which he apologized. However, Falk said his comments had been misrepresented and the apology was the product of party operatives working on the national campaign, not his own. Falk was a strong supporter of the “Freedom Convoy” against federal vaccine mandates. He refused to disclose his own vaccination status on the grounds of personal privacy.

As a result, Falk worked virtually as he was unable to take his seat in the House of Commons. Falk’s’ was one of the few federal offices that stayed open for business as usual throughout the pandemic. He has consistently called for a national public inquiry into government overreach during the pandemic.

At the time of the 2025 Canadian federal election, he lived in Friedensfeld, Manitoba.

== Electoral record ==
2025 Canadian federal election: Provencher
Party	Candidate	Votes	%	±%	Expenditures
Conservative	Ted Falk	34,364	66.34	+18.00	
Liberal	Trevor Kirczenow	13,394	25.86	+9.36	
New Democratic	Brandy Schmidt	2,398	4.63	–7.58	
People's	Noël Gautron	942	1.82	–15.67	
Green	Blair Mahaffy	705	1.36	–1.20	
Total valid votes/expense limit		51,803	99.27		
Total rejected ballots		383	0.73		
Turnout		52,186	71.73		
Eligible voters		72,752			
Conservative notional hold		Swing		+4.32	
Source: Elections Canada

2021 Canadian federal election: Provencher
Party	Candidate	Votes	%	±%	Expenditures
Conservative	Ted Falk	24,294	48.7	-17.2	$83,776.96
Liberal	Trevor Kirczenow	8,472	17.0	+3.9	$25,158.99
People's	Nöel Gautron	8,168	16.4	+14.2	$24,179.71
New Democratic	Serina Pottinger	6,270	12.6	-0.2	$0.00
Independent	Rick Loewen	1,366	2.7	N/A	$0.00
Green	Janine G. Gibson	1,272	2.6	-3.4	$1,596.00
Total valid votes/expense limit		49,901	99.5	–	$117,118.32
Total rejected ballots		355	0.5		
Turnout		50,156	67.4		
Eligible voters		74,468			
Conservative hold		Swing		-10.6	
Source: Elections Canada

2019 Canadian federal election: Provencher
Party	Candidate	Votes	%	±%	Expenditures
Conservative	Ted Falk	31,821	65.9	+9.84	$91,792.89
Liberal	Trevor Kirczenow	6,347	13.1	-21.56	$13,417.34
New Democratic	Erin McGee	6,187	12.8	+7.50	none listed
Green	Janine G. Gibson	2,884	6.0	+2.02	none listed
People's	Wayne Sturby	1,066	2.2		none listed
Total valid votes/expense limit		48,305	100.0		
Total rejected ballots		322			
Turnout		48,627	70.5		
Eligible voters		68,979			
Conservative hold		Swing		+7.85	
Source: Elections Canada

2015 Canadian federal election: Provencher
Party	Candidate	Votes	%	±%	Expenditures
Conservative	Ted Falk	25,086	56.06	-14.30	$116,699.56
Liberal	Terry Hayward	15,509	34.66	+27.93	$28,135.06
New Democratic	Les Lilley	2,371	5.30	-12.87	$4,287.04
Green	Jeff Wheeldon	1,779	3.98	+1.01	$6,485.90
Total valid votes/expense limit		44,745	100.00		$216,321.86
Total rejected ballots		169	0.38		
Turnout		44,914	69.53		
Eligible voters		64,598			
Conservative hold		Swing		-21.11	
Source: Elections Canada

Canadian federal by-election, November 25, 2013: Provencher Resignation of Vic Toews
Party	Candidate	Votes	%	±%	Expenditures
Conservative	Ted Falk	13,046	58.20	−12.40	$ 83,542.19
Liberal	Terry Hayward	6,711	29.94	+23.23	66,455.27
New Democratic	Natalie Courcelles Beaudry	1,843	8.22	−9.67	17,878.16
Green	Janine Gibson	817	3.64	+0.69	1,074.97
Total valid votes/expense limit		22,417	100.0	–	$ 97,453.98
Total rejected ballots		136	0.60	+0.17	
Turnout		22,553	33.85	−27.88	
Eligible voters		66,624			
Conservative hold		Swing		−17.86	
By-election due to the resignation of Vic Toews.
Source(s) "November 25, 2013 By-elections". Elections Canada. November 26, 2013. "November 25, 2013 By-election – Financial Reports".
