= 405 (disambiguation) =

405 was a common year starting on Sunday of the Julian calendar.

405 may also refer to:

- Interstate 405 (disambiguation), several United States freeways
  - There are other highways numbered 405, see the List of highways numbered 405
- Area code 405, which serves Central Oklahoma and Oklahoma City
- 405-line television system
- 405 (HTTP status code)
- Peugeot 405, a large family car
- The 405 (magazine), a UK-based music and culture website
- Bristol 405, a luxury car
- 405 (film), 3-minute short released in May 2000 by Bruce Branit and Jeremy Hunt
- "405", a song by Death Cab for Cutie from their 2000 album We Have the Facts and We're Voting Yes
- "The 405", a song by Isaac Hayes off his Raw and Refined album
- .405 Winchester, or .405 WCF, a firearm cartridge

== See also ==
- 405th (disambiguation)
