= Likhon =

Free and open-source Bangla input method

- The Layouts page of Likhon's Settings window on Windows
- Developer: Agniflux Enterprise
- Release: November 21, 2026; 1 day ago
- Stable release: 0.2.1 (alpha) / November 21, 2026; 1 day ago
- Written in: Rust, Swift, C, TypeScript
- Operating system: Windows 10 and 11, macOS 13 or later, Linux (IBus)
- Type: Input method
- License: MPL-2.0
- Website: likhon.agniflux.com
- Repository: github.com/Agniflux/Likhon/

Likhon (লিখন) is a free and open-source Bangla typing tool, an input method for Windows, macOS and Linux. It lets a person type Bangla with an English keyboard (for example, typing ami produces আমি) and also supports fixed keyboard layouts. It is developed by Agniflux Enterprise of Dhaka, Bangladesh, and released under the Mozilla Public License 2.0.

Phonetic typing: English letters become Bangla, and a suggestion list appears while a word is typed (illustration)

== Features ==
- Phonetic typing with a word-suggestion list, automatic correction of common spelling slips, and next-word prediction.
- Fixed layouts: Probhat and Jatiya are built in; others (such as Munir Optima, Avro Easy and Khipro) are available from an in-app library.
- Conversion tools between Unicode and the legacy Bijoy and Proshika encodings, a text cleaner, amounts written in words, Bangla numbers and dates.
- Privacy: the program states that what a person types stays on the computer, and that it has no analytics or telemetry and goes online only when the user asks (update check, library, dictionary download, donating words).
- A community library of layouts, themes, fonts and word lists, reviewed before publication.

The Library page of the Settings window

== Platforms ==
On Windows, Likhon is distributed as a single portable executable and as an installer that can add it to the Windows keyboard list. The Linux version is an IBus input method packaged as a .deb, and the macOS version is an input method distributed as a universal disk image. The Linux and macOS versions are labelled alpha.

== Technology ==
The typing engine is written in Rust and is shared by the Windows, macOS and Linux versions and by the browser tools on the project's website (through WebAssembly). Parts of the layouts, word list and converter are derived from Avro Keyboard, which is also published under the Mozilla Public License.

== History ==
Likhon's first public test builds appeared in 2026. Version 0.2.1 (21 November 2026) added the Windows installer and the first Linux and macOS versions.
