= List of highways numbered 405 =

Route 405 or Highway 405 may refer to:

== Canada ==
- Manitoba Provincial Road 405
- Newfoundland and Labrador Route 405
- Ontario Highway 405

== Costa Rica ==
- National Route 405

== Japan ==
- Japan National Route 405

== United Kingdom ==
- A405 road

== United States ==
- Interstate 405
  - Interstate 405 (California), a bypass of Los Angeles, California
  - Interstate 405 (Oregon), a bypass of Portland, Oregon
  - Interstate 405 (Washington), a bypass of Seattle, Washington
- Florida:
  - Florida State Road 405
  - County Road 405 (Brevard County, Florida)
- Georgia State Route 405 (unsigned designation for Interstate 95)
- Maryland Route 405
- New York:
  - New York State Route 405 (former)
  - County Route 405 (Albany County, New York)
  - County Route 405 (Erie County, New York)
- Pennsylvania Route 405
- Puerto Rico Highway 405
- Virginia State Route 405

Preceded by 404	Lists of highways 405	Succeeded by 406
