= 405th =

405th may refer to:

- 405th Air Expeditionary Group, the flying component of the 405th Air Expeditionary Wing
- 405th Air Expeditionary Wing, provisional United States Air Force unit assigned to Air Combat Command
- 405th Tactical Missile Squadron ("Green Dragons"), an inactive United States Air Force unit

== See also ==
- 405 (number)
- 405 (disambiguation)
- 405, the year 405 (CDV) of the Julian calendar
- 405 BC
