= Ibus =

Ibus or IBus may refer to:

- Intelligent Input Bus (IBus), an input-method framework for Unix-like computer operating-systems
- iBus (London), an Automatic Vehicle Location system used on London's buses
- iBus (Indore), BRT buses of Indore
- International Bitterness Units scale (IBUs), a measure of the bitterness of beer
- iBUS (device), a bus-monitoring and -management device for road transport systems

== See also ==
- Ibis
