= Interstate 405 =

Interstate 405 may refer to:

- Interstate 405 (California), a bypass of Los Angeles, California
- Interstate 405 (Oregon), western side of a loop around Portland, Oregon
- Interstate 405 (Washington), a bypass of Seattle, Washington

== See also ==
- Highway 405
- Ontario Highway 405
