= IBUS (device) =

iBUS, or Intelligent BUS Utility System, is a bus monitoring and management system device. It helps solve traffic problem in the worsening traffic congestion of mass transport systems in the developing country metro cities.

== Overview ==
iBUS digitally identifies a vehicle by using machine readable tags that will be part of a database. Its operation is managed through computers which system offers a playing field for everyone involved in the traffic problem: the bus drivers, the enforcers, the operators, the passengers. This would make the buses load and unload passengers in the proper designated areas only.

The iBUS system can organize the buses based on the machine readable tags. It can group the buses and allocate designated stop or pick up points. It will also impose a time limit on a bus stop usage. The bus will be programmed to stop and open its doors at allocated areas only. It also prides on the Real Time Location System (RTLS) to track the buses and project the exact arrival of buses at the designated loading and unloading areas.
