= Manitoba Provincial Road 405 =

Provincial Road in Manitoba, Canada

Provincial Road 405
- Van Gorp Road, Brule Road, Manning Road, River Road
- PR 405 highlighted in red

Route information
- Maintained by Department of Infrastructure
- Length: 15.5 km (9.6 mi)
- Existed: 1966–present

Major junctions
- West end: PTH 59 in Île-des-Chênes
- East end: PR 206 near Lorette

Location
- Country: Canada
- Province: Manitoba
- Rural municipalities: Ritchot, Taché

Highway system
- Provincial highways in Manitoba; Winnipeg City Routes
← PR 404	→ PR 406

Provincial Road 405 (PR 405) is a 15.5-kilometre-long (9.6 mi) east–west highway in both the Eastman and Winnipeg Metropolitan Regions of Manitoba, connecting the towns of Île-des-Chênes and Lorette. The majority of the highway is paved.

== Route description ==
PR 405 begins in the Rural Municipality of Ritchot at a junction with PTH 59 on the north side of Île-des-Chênes, heading due east as a paved two-lane highway to have an intersection with Main Street before leaving town heading through rural farmland for a few kilometres to enter the Rural Municipality of Taché. It makes both a sharp left then a sharp right as it begins following both the south bank of the Seine River and the southern edge of Lorette, where it has an intersection with St. Amant Avenue. With the asphalt turning to gravel shortly thereafter, PR 405 leaves Lorette behind and continues east, paralleling the river for several more kilometres before coming to an end at a junction with PR 206. Portions of the highway go by the street names Van Gorp Road, Brule Road, Manning Road, and River Road.

== Major intersections ==
Division	Location	km	mi	Destinations	Notes
Ritchot	Île-des-Chênes	0.0	0.0	PTH 59 – St-Pierre-Jolys, Winnipeg	Western terminus; road continues west as Van Gorp Road
Ritchot	Île-des-Chênes	0.5	0.31	Main Street – Île-des-Chênes	
Taché		10.4	6.5	St. Amant Avenue – Lorette	
		10.8	6.7	Pavement ends	
		15.5	9.6	PR 206 – Dugald, Landmark	Eastern terminus; road continues east as River Road
1.000 mi = 1.609 km; 1.000 km = 0.621 mi
