= List of highways numbered 404 =

The following highways are numbered 404:

== Australia ==
- Victoria

== Canada ==
- Manitoba Provincial Road 404
- Newfoundland and Labrador Route 404
- Ontario Highway 404

== Costa Rica ==
- National Route 404

== Israel ==
- Route 404 (Israel)

== Japan ==
- Japan National Route 404

== United Kingdom ==
- A404 road London - Maidenhead
- A404(M) Berkshire

== United States ==
- Delaware Route 404
  - Delaware Route 404 Alternate (former)
  - Delaware Route 404 Business
  - Delaware Route 404 Truck
- Florida State Road 404
- Georgia State Route 404 (unsigned designation for Interstate 16)
  - Georgia State Route 404 Spur
- Iowa Highway 404 (unsigned designation for U.S. Route 75 Business)
- Maryland Route 404
  - Maryland Route 404 Alternate
  - Maryland Route 404 Business
- New Mexico State Road 404
- New York:
  - New York State Route 404
    - New York State Route 404 (former)
  - County Route 404 (Albany County, New York)
  - County Route 404 (Erie County, New York)
- Puerto Rico Highway 404
- Texas:
- Texas State Highway Loop 404
- Farm to Market Road 404 (former)
- Virginia State Route 404

Preceded by 403	Lists of highways 404	Succeeded by 405
