= Manitoba Highway 11 =

Highway in Manitoba

Provincial Trunk Highway 11
- PTH 11 highlighted in red

Route information
- Maintained by Manitoba Infrastructure
- Length: 140 km (87 mi)
- Existed: 1926–present

Major junctions
- South end: PTH 1 (TCH) south of Hadashville
- PTH 15 in Elma; PTH 44 from Whitemouth to Siegs Corner
- North end: PTH 59 south of Victoria Beach

Location
- Country: Canada
- Province: Manitoba
- Rural municipalities: Alexander; Lac du Bonnet; Reynolds; Whitemouth
- Towns: Lac du Bonnet; Powerview-Pine Falls

Highway system
- Provincial highways in Manitoba; Winnipeg City Routes
← PTH 10A	→ PTH 12

Provincial Trunk Highway 11 (PTH 11) is a provincial primary highway located in the Eastman Region of the Canadian province of Manitoba. It runs from an intersection with PTH 59 near Victoria Beach to an intersection with PTH 1.

== Route description ==
PTH 11 begins at an intersection with PTH 1 (Trans-Canada Highway) in the hamlet of Hadashville, located in the Rural Municipality of Reynolds. The highway heads north through the hamlet, running parallel to the western banks of the Whitemouth River, eventually leaving and traveling just to the west of Medika, having intersections with PR 507 and PR 506, before crossing into the Rural Municipality of Whitemouth.

PTH 11 travels straight through the town of Elma, where it has a junction with PTH 15 and makes its first crossing of the Whitemouth River, before becoming concurrent with PTH 44 and making its second crossing of the river as the two head west. The highway curves northwestward to follow along the western banks of the river, having an intersection with PR 406 as they travel through the town of Whitemouth. PTH 11/PTH 44 have an intersection with PR 408 as they wind up the riverbanks for several kilometers before PTH 11 splits off and heads north at a junction in Siegs Corner. PTH 11 has an intersection with PR 307 near Seven Sisters Falls, where the highway joins the La Vérendrye Trail, as well as passes by the Whiteshell Provincial Park (the site of where the Whitemouth River merged into the Winnipeg River).

PTH 11 follows the Winnipeg river northward to cross into the Rural Municipality of Lac du Bonnet immediately before having an intersection with PR 211 (leads to Pinawa and Pinawa Provincial Wayside Park) and traveling through Brookfield. The highway passes briefly through the Pinawa Local Government District before re-entering the Rural Municipality of Lac du Bonnet and having an intersection with PR 214. It now travels through the town of Lac du Bonnet, mostly following a western bypass of the town as it has intersections with PR 502 and PR 317. The highway travels along the coastline of Lac du Bonnet and has an intersection with PR 313 before crossing into the Rural Municipality of Alexander.

PTH 11 passes by several reservoirs along the Winnipeg River for the next several kilometers, traveling through Crescent Bay and past McArthur Falls Generating Station. The highway curves to the west, as it travels through the hamlet of Great Falls and passes by the Great Falls Generating Station, before winding its way northwest along the riverbanks, passing through White Mud Falls, Silver Falls, and St. Georges. It enters the town of Powerview-Pine Falls at an intersection with PR 304, passing directly through both sectors of town before leaving Powerview-Pine Falls and traveling through the Sagkeeng First Nation for the next several kilometers.

PTH 11 re-enters the Rural Municipality of Alexander as it starts following the southeastern coastline of Lake Winnipeg, which follows westward for a few kilometers before coming to an end at an intersection with PTH 59, just south of the border with the Rural Municipality of Victoria Beach. La Vérendrye Trail follows PTH 59 southbound.

With the exclusion of an extremely short section of 4-land divided highway at the junction between PTH 44 and PTH 11 in Siegs Corner, the entire length Provincial Trunk Highway 11 is a paved, rural, two lane highway.

== History ==
PTH 11 is one of the original numbered highways within the province of Manitoba, first appearing on the original 1926 Manitoba Highway Map. Originally a short connector highway spanning 32 kilometres (20 mi) between PTH 1 at Seddons Corner and Lac du Bonnet, the highway was extended north to Pine Falls in 1947.

In 1954, PTH 11 obtained the distinction of being both a north–south and east–west highway much like current PTH 5, PTH 20, and PTH 50. That year, the highway was extended south through Whitemouth (running in concurrence with PTH 1), Elma and Hadashville before turning west to meet PTH 12 just north of Ste. Anne. The following year, the section between PR 214 and PTH 44 was completed and opened to traffic. The former east–west section of PTH 11 was redesignated as PTH 1 in 1958 in preparation for its inclusion in the Trans-Canada Highway system four years later. This redesignated PTH 11 to its current southbound terminus near Hadashville.

PTH 11 was extended farther north from Pine Falls to its current northbound terminus with PTH 59 in 1966, replacing what had been previously designated as PTH 12.

== Major intersections ==
Division	Location	km	mi	Destinations	Notes
Reynolds		0	0.0	PTH 1 (TCH) – Winnipeg, Falcon Lake	
Reynolds		9	5.6	PR 507 east – Medika	
Reynolds–Whitemouth boundary		16	9.9	PR 506 south / Spruce Siding Road (Road 54 North)	
Whitemouth	Elma	24	15	PTH 15 west – Anola, Winnipeg	
Whitemouth		32	20	PTH 44 east – West Hawk Lake	Southern end of PTH 44 concurrency
Whitemouth		36	22	PR 406 south – Elma	
Whitemouth		44	27	PR 408 north – River Hills	
Whitemouth	Siegs Corner	54	34	PTH 44 west – Beausejour, Winnipeg	Northern end of PTH 44 concurrency
Whitemouth		59	37	PR 307 east – Seven Sisters Falls, Whiteshell Provincial Park	La Vérendrye Trail branches east onto PR 307
Lac du Bonnet	Brookfield	63	39	PR 211 east – Pinawa	
Pinawa L.G.D.	No major junctions				
Lac du Bonnet		73	45	PR 214 south (Milner Ridge Road)	
Town of Lac du Bonnet		78	48	PR 502 north	
Town of Lac du Bonnet		79	49	PR 317 – Libau	
Lac du Bonnet		82	51	PR 313 east – Pointe du Bois	
Alexander	Great Falls	92	57	Great Falls Road – Great Falls	
Alexander	Silver Falls	103	64	Silver Falls Airport	Access road into airport
Alexander	Silver Falls	104	65	Silverdale Drive – Silver Falls	
Alexander	St. Georges	109	68	Bouvier Trail	Former PR 219 west
Town of Powerview-Pine Falls		114	71	PR 304 – Stead, Beaconia, Bissett	Former PR 219 west
Sagkeeng First Nation	No major junctions				
Alexander		140	87	PTH 59 – Winnipeg, Victoria Beach	La Vérendrye Trail continues east on PTH 59 south
1.000 mi = 1.609 km; 1.000 km = 0.621 mi: Concurrency terminus; Route transition

== Related routes ==
=== Provincial Road 406 ===
Provincial Road 406
- Location: Elma–Whitemouth
- Length: 8.7 km (5.4 mi)
- Existed: 1966–present

Provincial Road 406 (PR 406) is a 8.7-kilometre-long (5.4 mi) north–south highway in the Rural Municipality of Whitemouth. Being a gravel two-lane road for its entire length, it serves as an alternative to PTH 11 between the towns of Elma and Whitemouth while paralleling the west bank of the Whitemouth River.

Division	Location	km	mi	Destinations	Notes
Whitemouth		0.0	0.0	PTH 15 (Dugald Road) – Elma, Winnipeg	Southern terminus
Whitemouth		8.7	5.4	PTH 11 / PTH 44 – Lac du Bonnet, Beausejour, West Hawk Lake	Northern terminus
1.000 mi = 1.609 km; 1.000 km = 0.621 mi

=== Provincial Road 408 ===
Provincial Road 408
- Location: Rural Municipality of Whitemouth
- Length: 13.5 km (8.4 mi)
- Existed: 1966–present

Provincial Road 408 (PR 408) is a 13.5-kilometre-long (8.4 mi) north–south spur of PTH 11 in the Rural Municipality of Whitemouth, connecting the highway with the hamlets of Oldenburg and River Hills, as well as the town Seven Sisters Falls.

PR 408 begins at an intersection with PTH 11 just north of the town of Whitemouth, heading north as a two-lane gravel road to immediately cross a bridge over the Whitemouth River. Now paralleling the east bank of the river, it travels through the communities of Oldenburg and River Hills, where it becomes a paved two-lane highway, before entering the town of Seven Sisters Falls, where it comes to an end at an intersection with PR 307 (La Vérendrye Trail). The road continues north for a short distance into Whitemouth Falls Provincial Park as Two Rivers Drive.

Division	Location	km	mi	Destinations	Notes
Whitemouth		0.0	0.0	PTH 11 – Whitemouth, Lac du Bonnet	Southern terminus
Whitemouth		0.3– 0.4	0.19– 0.25	Bridge over the Whitemouth River	
Whitemouth	River Hills	9.6	6.0	Pavement begins	
Whitemouth	Seven Sisters Falls	13.5	8.4	PR 307 (La Vérendrye Trail) to PTH 11 – Whiteshell Provincial Park; Two Rivers Drive – Whitemouth Falls Provincial Park	Northern terminus; road continues north as Two Rivers Drive
1.000 mi = 1.609 km; 1.000 km = 0.621 mi

=== Provincial Road 502 ===
Provincial Road 502
- Minnewawa Street, McArthur Avenue, First Street
- Location: Lac du Bonnet
- Length: 5.6 km (3.5 mi)
- Existed: 1966–present

Provincial Road 502 (PR 502) is a 5.6-kilometre-long (3.5 mi) north–south business loop off of PTH 11 in the town of Lac du Bonnet.

PR 502 begins at an intersection with PTH 11 (La Vérendrye Trail) on the south side of town, heading east through an industrial area along Minnewawa Street before making a left onto McArthur Avenue. After heading northward through neighbourhoods, the highway enters downtown and makes a right onto First Street at a junction with PR 317. Now leaving the town proper, PR 502 enters the Rural Municipality of Lac du Bonnet and heads northeast along the coastline of Lac du Bonnet past several lakeside cottages and businesses. PR 502 has an intersection with Tinant Road, a short connector to PTH 11, before curving more eastward to come to an end at a junction with PR 313 via a sharp left. The entire length of PR 502 is a paved two-lane highway.

Division	Location	km	mi	Destinations	Notes
Town of Lac du Bonnet		0.0	0.0	PTH 11 (La Vérendrye Trail) – Whitemouth, Powerview-Pine Falls	Southern terminus; road continues west as Minnewawa Street W
Town of Lac du Bonnet		1.3	0.81	PR 317 west (McArthur Avenue) – Libau	Eastern terminus of PR 317
Lac du Bonnet		3.7	2.3	Tinant Road to PTH 11	Short access road to PTH 11
Lac du Bonnet		5.6	3.5	PR 313 – Lac du Bonnet, Pointe du Bois	Northern terminus; road continues north as Blueberry Rock Road
1.000 mi = 1.609 km; 1.000 km = 0.621 mi

=== Provincial Road 506 ===
Provincial Road 506
- Location: Elma - Prawda
- Length: 22.4 km (13.9 mi)
- Existed: 1966–present

Provincial Road 506 (PR 506) is a 22.4-kilometre-long (13.9 mi) north–south spur of PTH 11, mostly located in the Rural Municipality of Reynolds. It provides a connection between the towns of Elma and Prawda. The highway is entirely a two-lane gravel road except in Prawda, where it is paved, and includes a bridge over the Whitemouth River. PR 506 runs parallel to the left bank of the Birch River for nearly its entire length.

Division	Location	km	mi	Destinations	Notes
Reynolds	Prawda	0.0	0.0	PTH 1 (TCH) – Kenora, Winnipeg	Southern terminus; southern end of paved section; road continues south as McKinley Road 73E
Reynolds	Prawda	0.8	0.50	Northern end of paved section	
Reynolds		11.6	7.2	PR 507 west – Medika	Eastern terminus of PR 507
Reynolds / Whitemouth boundary		20.5	12.7	Bridge over the Whitemouth River	
Reynolds / Whitemouth boundary		22.4	13.9	PTH 11 – Hadashville, Whitemouth; Spruce Siding Road (Road 54N) – Spruce Siding	Northern terminus; road continues west as Spruce Siding Road
1.000 mi = 1.609 km; 1.000 km = 0.621 mi

=== Provincial Road 507 ===
Provincial Road 507
- Road 50N
- Location: Medika
- Length: 4.0 km (2.5 mi)
- Existed: 1966–present

Provincial Road 507 (PR 507) is a short 4.0-kilometre-long (2.5 mi) east–west spur of PTH 11 in the Rural Municipality of Reynolds, providing access to the community of Medika. It is entirely a gravel two-lane road, and includes a bridge across the Whitemouth River.

Division	Location	km	mi	Destinations	Notes
Reynolds		0.0	0.0	PTH 11 to PTH 1 (TCH) – Hadashville, Elma	Western terminus; road continues west as Road 50N
Reynolds	Medika	2.0	1.2	Bridge over the Whitemouth River	
Reynolds		4.0	2.5	PR 506 – Elma, Prawda	Eastern terminus; road continues east as Road 50N
1.000 mi = 1.609 km; 1.000 km = 0.621 mi
