= La Vérendrye Trail =

- La Vérendrye Trail highlighted in red

Route information
- Component highways: PTH 11 (section); PTH 44 (section); PTH 59 (section); PR 204 (section); PR 212 (section); PR 307; PR 508

Major junctions
- West end: PTH 101 near Winnipeg
- East end: PTH 1 (TCH) near West Hawk Lake

Location
- Country: Canada
- Province: Manitoba
- Rural municipalities: Alexander, East St. Paul, Lac du Bonnet, Reynolds, St. Clements, Whitemouth
- Towns: Lac du Bonnet, Powerview-Pine Falls

Highway system
- Provincial highways in Manitoba; Winnipeg City Routes

The La Vérendrye Trail (French: Le chemin La Vérendrye) is a series of highways in the Canadian province of Manitoba commemorating the oldest waterway fur-trading route in the province. It is named after Pierre Gaultier de Varennes, sieur de La Vérendrye, an explorer and fur-trader who is often credited as being the first European to visit what is now southern Manitoba.

== Route description ==
The La Vérendrye Trail generally follows the Red and Winnipeg River systems used by early fur-traders to travel through eastern Manitoba. The vehicular route begins at Provincial Trunk Highway (PTH) 101 (Winnipeg's Perimeter Highway) and comprises the following roads:

- Provincial Road 204 – PTH 101 (Perimeter Highway) to Provincial Road 212
- Provincial Road 212 – Provincial Road 204 to Provincial Road 508
- Provincial Road 508 – entire route
- PTH 59 – Provincial Road 508 to PTH 11
- PTH 11 – PTH 59 to Provincial Road 307
- Provincial Road 307 – entire route
- PTH 44 – Provincial Road 307 to PTH 1 (Trans-Canada Highway)

Communities along the trail include Lockport, East Selkirk, Powerview-Pine Falls, St. Georges, Lac du Bonnet, and Seven Sisters Falls. The trail also passes through three First Nations territories. The easternmost part of the trail lies within Whiteshell Provincial Park.

== Other uses ==
The La Vérendrye Trail is also the name of a 16-kilometre (9.9 mi) hiking trail located within Whiteshell Provincial Park.

A monument in the Municipality of Pembina commemorates Sieur de La Vérendrye's further travels through south-central Manitoba.

== Major intersections ==
Division	Location	km	mi	Destinations	Notes
East St. Paul		0	0.0	PTH 101 (Perimeter Highway) – Brandon; Route 42 south (Henderson Highway) – Winnipeg	Interchange, western terminus of La Vérendrye Trail; La Vérendrye Trail follows PR 204 north
St. Clements	Lockport	17	11	PTH 44 west	West end of PR 204/PTH 44 concurrency
St. Clements	Lockport	18	11	Crosses the Red River Floodway	
St. Clements	Lockport	19	12	PTH 44 east – Beausejour	Interchange; east end of PR 204/PTH 44 concurrency
St. Clements	East Selkirk	28	17	PR 204 north – Selkirk	La Vérendrye Trail follows PR 212 east
St. Clements	East Selkirk	28	17	PR 212 east	La Vérendrye Trail follows PR 508 north
St. Clements		35	22	PTH 4 – To PTH 59, To PTH 9 – Selkirk	
St. Clements		42	26	PTH 59 south – Winnipeg	La Vérendrye Trail follows PTH 59 north
Brokenhead Ojibway Nation	No major junctions				
Alexander / St. Clements		73	45	PTH 12 south – Beausejour, Steinbach	South end of PTH 12/59 concurrency
Alexander / St. Clements		75	47	PR 304 north / PR 500 west – Powerview-Pine Falls	
Alexander / St. Clements		83	52	PTH 12 north – Grand Beach Provincial Park	North end of PTH 12/59 concurrency
Alexander		96	60	PTH 59 north – Victoria Beach	La Vérendrye Trail follows PTH 11 south
Sagkeeng First Nation	No major junctions				
Town of Powerview-Pine Falls		125	78	PR 304 – Bissett	
Alexander	No major junctions				
Lac du Bonnet		165	103	PR 313 east	
Town of Lac du Bonnet		167	104	PR 317	
Lac du Bonnet		182	113	PR 211 east – Pinawa	
Lac du Bonnet		186	116	PTH 11 south – Elma, Whitemouth	La Vérendrye Trail follows PR 307 east
Lac du Bonnet		198	123	Enters Whiteshell Provincial Park	
No. 1		240	150	PR 309 north – Big Whiteshell Lake	
Reynolds		264	164	PTH 44 west – Beausejour	La Vérendrye Trail follows PTH 44 east
No. 1	West Hawk Lake	297	185	PTH 1 (TCH) – Winnipeg, Kenora	Interchange; eastern terminus of La Vérendrye Trail
1.000 mi = 1.609 km; 1.000 km = 0.621 mi: Concurrency terminus; Route transition
