= Manitoba Highway 44 =

Provincial highway in Manitoba, Canada

Provincial Trunk Highway 44
- Historic Highway No. 1 Lockport Rd
- PTH 44 highlighted in red

Route information
- Maintained by Department of Infrastructure
- Length: 149 km (93 mi)
- Existed: 1968–present

Major junctions
- West end: PTH 9 at Lockport
- PTH 59 at Kirkness; PTH 12 at Beausejour; PTH 11 near Whitemouth
- East end: PTH 1 (TCH) near West Hawk Lake

Location
- Country: Canada
- Province: Manitoba
- Rural municipalities: Brokenhead; Lac du Bonnet; Reynolds; St. Andrews; St. Clements; Whitemouth
- Towns: Beausejour

Highway system
- Provincial highways in Manitoba; Winnipeg City Routes
← PTH 42	→ PTH 45

Provincial Trunk Highway 44 (PTH 44) is an east–west provincial highway in the Eastman Region of the Canadian province of Manitoba.

It begins at Highway 9 near Lockport, north of Winnipeg. The highway travels east through Beausejour before heading southeast in concurrency with Highway 11 for approximately 20 kilometres (12 miles) and then continues southeast through Whiteshell Provincial Park. PTH 44 ends at the Trans-Canada Highway near the Ontario boundary. It is a substandard highway through Whiteshell Park, more comparable to a Provincial Road with little to no shoulder and an uneven driving surface. The speed limit along Highway 44 is 100 kilometres per hour (62 mph) outside Whiteshell Park and between 60 kilometres per hour (37 mph) and 90 kilometres per hour (56 mph) within the park.

== Route description ==
PTH 44 begins in the Rural Municipality of St. Andrews at an intersection with PTH 9 in Lockport, with the road heading southeast as a two-lane highway through neighborhoods to have an intersection with PR 238 (River Road) and cross the Red River via the St. Andrews Caméré Curtain Bridge Dam. The highway enters the Rural Municipality of St. Clements, passing by Lockport Provincial Park and several businesses, where it has a short concurrency (overlap) with PR 204 (Henderson Highway) as it crosses the Red River Floodway to leave Lockport. After PR 204 splits off at an interchange, PTH 44 heads east to pass through Kirkness, where it has an interchange with PTH 59 and widens to a four lane divided highway. It has an intersection with PR 206 just prior to traveling through Highland Glen, where it junctions with PR 212.

PTH 44 enters the Rural Municipality of Brokenhead as it travels through Garson and Tyndall, becoming concurrent with PTH 12 and the two run along the northern edge of the town of Beausejour, where PTH 44 splits off and heads south as a two-lane. PTH 44 runs along the eastern edge of town before heading east at an intersection with Park Avenue (PR 215) and PR 302. It leaves Beausejour, traveling across the Brokenhead River and past the communities of St. Ouens and Golden Bay to start straddling the border between the Rural Municipalities of Lac du Bonnet and Reynolds for the next several kilometers.

PTH 44 travels through woodlands, passing by Molson and Seddons Corner (where it has an intersection with PR 214), before entering the Rural Municipality of Whitemouth at Seigs Corner. The highway begins a concurrency with PTH 11 here and the two head southeast along the banks of the Whitemouth River for several kilometers, having an intersection with PR 408 before passing straight through the town of Whitemouth. PTH 11 / 44 junction with PR 406 just prior to crossing the Whitemouth River, with PTH 11 splitting and heading south towards Elma a short distance later.

The highway enters the Rural Municipality of Reynolds and begins traveling through remote woodlands for the next several kilometers. PTH 44 travels through the community of Rennie before entering Whiteshell Provincial Park, with the road becoming narrow and windy for the next 31 kilometres (19 mi) after an intersection with PR 307. It joins the La Vérendrye Trail here, traveling through remote sections of the park, junctioning with PR 312 as it goes around the western side of West Hawk Lake. PTH 44 travels through the community of West Hawk Lake, where the highway make a sharp right before coming to an end at an interchange with PTH 1 (Trans-Canada Highway).

== History ==
PTH 44 was originally part of Highway 1. When the new Highway 1 route was completed as part of the Trans-Canada Highway project in 1958, this section became part of transprovincial Highway 4 (along with current Highways 9, 16, and 26). The highway was renumbered to its current designation in 1968.

== Major intersections ==
Division	Location	km	mi	Destinations	Notes
St. Andrews	Lockport	0.0	0.0	PTH 9 – Gimli, Selkirk, Winnipeg	PTH 44 western terminus
St. Andrews	Lockport	0.9	0.56	PR 238 south (River Road)	
↑ / ↓	Lockport	1.1– 1.6	0.68– 0.99	Crosses the Red River (St. Andrews Caméré Curtain Bridge Dam)	
St. Clements	Lockport	1.8	1.1	PR 204 south (Henderson Highway) – Winnipeg	West end of PR 204 concurrency
St. Clements		2.1– 2.4	1.3– 1.5	Crosses the Red River Floodway	
St. Clements		2.4– 2.8	1.5– 1.7	PR 204 north (Henderson Highway) – Selkirk	Interchange; east end of PR 204 concurrency
St. Clements	Kirkness	6.0– 6.8	3.7– 4.2	PTH 59 – Grand Beach, Victoria Beach, Winnipeg	Interchange
St. Clements		8.6	5.3	PR 206 south – Dugald, Landmark, Oakbank	
St. Clements	Highland Glen	13.5	8.4	PR 212 – Cooks Creek, East Selkirk	
Brokenhead	Garson	18.5	11.5	Gillis Street – Garson	Former PR 306 south
Brokenhead	Tyndall	21.8	13.5	Pierson Drive (Road 35E) – Tyndall	Former PR 510 north
Brokenhead		23.4	14.5	PTH 12 south – Steinbach, Ste. Anne	West end of PTH 12 concurrency
Town of Beausejour		31.6	19.6	First Street	Former PTH 4B
Town of Beausejour		33.2	20.6	PTH 12 north – Grand Beach	PTH 44 branches south; East end of PTH 12 concurrency
Town of Beausejour		34.9	21.7	PR 215 west (Park Avenue); PR 302 south – Richer, La Broquerie	PTH 44 branches east; former PTH 4B
Brokenhead	St. Ouens	36.1	22.4	Bridge over the Brokenhead River	
Brokenhead	St. Ouens	37.1	23.1	Road 44E – St. Ouens	
↑ / ↓		44.6	27.7	Road 48E	Former PR 316 north
Lac du Bonnet / Reynolds		48.0	29.8	Molson Road (Road 50E) – Molson	
Lac du Bonnet / Reynolds	Seddons Corner	49.6	30.8	PR 214 north (Milner Ridge Road)	Former PTH 11
Whitemouth		65.2	40.5	PTH 11 north – Lac du Bonnet, Powerview-Pine Falls	PTH 44 turns southeast; west end of PTH 11 concurrency
Whitemouth		75.0	46.6	PR 408 north – River Hills	
Whitemouth		81.7	50.8	PR 406 south – Elma	PTH 11 / PTH 44 turns east
Whitemouth		85.2	52.9	PTH 11 south – Hadashville, Elma	East end of PTH 11 concurrency
Reynolds		115.0	71.5	Enters Whiteshell Provincial Park	
Reynolds		115.9	72.0	PR 307 west – Brereton Lake, White Lake	La Vérendrye Trail branches west on PR 307
No. 1		141.3	87.8	PR 312 east – Ingolf	PTH 44 turns south before PR 312 junction
No. 1		146.4	91.0	PR 301 west – Falcon Lake	
No. 1	West Hawk Lake	147.2	91.5	unnamed road	Former PTH 1; PTH 44 turns south
No. 1		148.7	92.4	PTH 1 (TCH) – Kenora, Winnipeg	Interchange; PTH 44 and La Vérendrye Trail eastern terminus
1.000 mi = 1.609 km; 1.000 km = 0.621 mi: Concurrency terminus; Route transition

== Related route ==
Provincial Road 312
- Location: Whiteshell Provincial Park
- Length: 5.5 km (3.4 mi)
- Existed: 1966–present

Provincial Road 312 (PR 312) is a short 5.5-kilometre-long (3.4 mi) east-west spur of PTH 44 located entirely inside Whiteshell Provincial Park, serving as the only road connection to the hamlet of Ingolf, Ontario, as well as several lakes, trails and the Whiteshell Fish Hatchery. It is an paved two-lane road for its entire length.

Division	Location	km	mi	Destinations	Notes
No. 1	Whiteshell Provincial Park	0.0	0.0	PTH 44 (La Vérendrye Trail) – West Hawk Lake, Rennie	Western terminus
No. 1	Whiteshell Provincial Park	5.5	3.4	Ingolf Road – Ingolf	Continuation into Ontario; eastern terminus
1.000 mi = 1.609 km; 1.000 km = 0.621 mi
