= Manitoba Highway 15 =

Highway in Manitoba

Provincial Trunk Highway 15
- Dugald Road
- PTH 15 highlighted in red

Route information
- Maintained by Manitoba Infrastructure
- Length: 75.5 km (46.9 mi)
- Existed: 1953–present

Major junctions
- West end: PTH 101 / Route 115 in Winnipeg
- PTH 12 at Anola
- East end: PTH 11 at Elma

Location
- Country: Canada
- Province: Manitoba
- Rural municipalities: Reynolds; Springfield; Whitemouth
- Major cities: Winnipeg

Highway system
- Provincial highways in Manitoba; Winnipeg City Routes
← PTH 14	→ PTH 16

Provincial Trunk Highway 15 (PTH 15) is a provincial highway in the Canadian province of Manitoba. It runs from Winnipeg's Perimeter Highway (where it meets with the city's Route 115) east to Elma where it ends at PTH 11. PTH 15 and the portion of Route 115 east of PTH 59 are collectively known as Dugald Road.

On the trip between Winnipeg and Elma, several significant landmarks exist, as well as the towns of Dugald and Anola. Also along that stretch of picturesque highway lies the longitudinal Centre of Canada, which is marked on PTH 1 several kilometres south.

== Route description ==
PTH 15 begins on the eastern side of the city of Winnipeg at an intersection with PTH 101 (Perimeter Highway), with the road continuing westward into the city as Winnipeg Route 115 (Dugald Road). The highway heads east to immediately cross a bridge over the Red River Floodway to enter the Rural Municipality of Springfield, as a 2-lane divided highway, meeting a junction with PR 207 (Deacon Road). PTH 15 becomes undivided and heads due east through farmland to travel straight through the center of Dugald, where it has an intersection with PR 206 and crosses a railroad. The road crosses Edie Creek and travels through Anola, where it has an intersection with PTH 12, Vivian, where it has a short concurrency (overlap) with PR 302, and Nourse, where it crosses the Brokenhead River into the Rural Municipality of Reynolds.

PTH 15 now begins traveling through woodlands for the next several kilometers as it passes through the communities of Ste. Rita and Contour before entering the Rural Municipality of Whitemouth. The highway passes through Lewis and Stony Hill as it re-enters farmland as well as the town of Elma. PTH 15 has an intersection with PR 406 before traveling straight through the center of town, coming to an end at an intersection with PTH 11 along the banks of the Whitemouth River.

Throughout its length, PTH 15 runs parallel to, and even crosses in Dugald, a Canadian National Railway line.

== History ==
PTH 15 was originally designated as a road from PTH 12 south to Steinbach then east, southeast and south via Piney to the Minnesota border. This was eliminated in 1939 as a result of the elimination of Municipal Roads. It is now PTH 12, PTH 52, PR 210, PR 203, and Highway 89.

PTH 15 formerly extended into the present-day city of Winnipeg. Prior to 1966, PTH 15 followed Dugald Road through Transcona to PTH 59 (Lagimodiere Boulevard) in St. Boniface; both were amalgamated into Winnipeg in 1971. When the Winnipeg Metro Routes were established in c. 1966, the section of PTH 15 inside the Perimeter Highway became Winnipeg Route 115.

== Major intersections ==
Division	Location	km	mi	Destinations	Notes
City of Winnipeg		−8.2	−5.1	Lagimodiere Boulevard (PTH 59) / Route 20 / Route 115 west / Dugald Road	Former PTH 15 western terminus
City of Winnipeg		0.0	0.0	Route 115 ends Perimeter Highway (PTH 101)	PTH 15 western terminus; Route 115 eastern terminus
Springfield		0.4	0.25	Crosses the Red River Floodway	
Springfield		1.8	1.1	PR 207 (Deacon Road) – Lorette	
Springfield	Dugald	8.3	5.2	PR 206 – Landmark, Oakbank	
Springfield		18.1	11.2	Dundee Garson Road (Road 33E)	Former PR 306 north
Springfield	Anola	23.0	14.3	PTH 12 – Beausejour, Steinbach	
Springfield		33.0	20.5	PR 302 north – Beausejour	West end of PR 302 concurrency
Springfield		34.3	21.3	PR 302 south – Richer, La Broquerie	East end of PR 302 concurrency
Reynolds	No major junctions				
Whitemouth		75.0	46.6	PR 406 north – Whitemouth	
Whitemouth	Elma	75.5	46.9	PTH 11 – Hadashville, Lac du Bonnet	PTH 15 eastern terminus
1.000 mi = 1.609 km; 1.000 km = 0.621 mi: Closed/former; Concurrency terminus; Route transition
