= Manitoba Provincial Road 307 =

Provincial road in Manitoba, Canada

Provincial Road 307
- La Vérendrye Trail
- PR 307 highlighted in red

Route information
- Maintained by Department of Infrastructure
- Length: 77 km (48 mi)
- Existed: 1966–present

Major junctions
- West end: PTH 11 near Seven Sister Falls
- East end: PTH 44 near Rennie

Location
- Country: Canada
- Province: Manitoba
- Rural municipalities: Reynolds; Whitemouth

Highway system
- Provincial highways in Manitoba; Winnipeg City Routes
← PR 306	→ PR 308

Provincial Road 307 (PR 307) is a provincial road in the Eastman Region of the Canadian province of Manitoba. It is part of the La Vérendrye Trail in eastern Manitoba and lies mostly within Whiteshell Provincial Park. For the majority of its length, the highway is both paralleled by, as well as part of, the Trans Canada Trail (North Whiteshell Trail section).

== Route description ==
PR 307 begins at Provincial Trunk Highway 11 (PTH 11) and heads east approximately 12 kilometres (7.5 mi), passing through the community of Seven Sister Falls, before entering Whiteshell Provincial Park. It then winds through the west-central region of the park before ending at PTH 44 near Rennie.

The western part of PR 307 provides access to the Seven Sisters Falls Generating Station and Whitemouth Falls Provincial Park. Within the Whiteshell, PR 307 provides access to numerous lakes and cottage areas, including Brereton Lake, Dorothy Lake, Nutamik Lake, Betula Lake, White Lake, Otter Falls, and Red Rock Lake. Big Whiteshell Lake can be reached from PR 307 via PR 309.

== Major intersections ==
Division	Location	km	mi	Destinations	Notes
Whitemouth		0.0	0.0	PTH 11 (La Vérendrye Trail west) – Winnipeg, Lac du Bonnet	Western terminus; La Vérendrye Trail follows PTH 11 northbound
Whitemouth	Seven Sisters Falls	2.1– 2.2	1.3– 1.4	Bridge over the Whitemouth River	
Whitemouth	Seven Sisters Falls	2.7	1.7	PR 408 south – River Hills; Two Rivers Drive – Whitemouth Falls Provincial Park	Northern terminus of PR 408
Whitemouth	Seven Sisters Falls	3.5	2.2	Townsite Road – Seven Sisters Generating Station	
Whiteshell Provincial Park		39.2	24.4	Bridge over the Rennie River	
Whiteshell Provincial Park		52.3	32.5	Bridge over the Whiteshell River	
Whiteshell Provincial Park		54.7	34.0	PR 309 east – Big Whiteshell Lake	Western terminus of PR 309
Whiteshell Provincial Park		55.6	34.5	Bridge over the Whiteshell River	
Whiteshell Provincial Park		65.9	40.9	Bridge over the Rennie River	
Whiteshell Provincial Park		69.5	43.2	Bridge over the Rennie River	
Reynolds		77.0	47.8	PTH 44 (La Vérendrye Trail east) – Rennie, West Hawk Lake	Eastern terminus; La Vérendrye Trail continues along PTH 44 eastbound
1.000 mi = 1.609 km; 1.000 km = 0.621 mi

== Related route ==
Provincial Road 309
- Location: Whiteshell Provincial Park
- Length: 12.2 km (7.6 mi)
- Existed: 1966–present

Provincial Road 309 (PR 309) is a 12.2-kilometre-long (7.6 mi) east-west spur of PR 307, located entirely within Whiteshell Provincial Park. It provides access to several trails and picnic areas of the park, as well as Big Whiteshell Lake and Big Whiteshell Lake Lodge at its eastern end. It is entirely a paved two-lane highway, paralleling the course of the Whiteshell River for the majority of its length.

Division	Location	km	mi	Destinations	Notes
Whiteshell Provincial Park		0.0	0.0	PR 307 (La Vérendrye Trail) – Seven Sisters Falls, Rennie	Western terminus
Whiteshell Provincial Park		12.2	7.6	Big Whiteshell Lake Lodge, Mantario Trail North Trailhead	Eastern terminus
1.000 mi = 1.609 km; 1.000 km = 0.621 mi
