= Manitoba Provincial Road 317 =

Provincial road in Manitoba, Canada

Provincial Road 317
- PR 317 highlighted in red

Route information
- Maintained by Department of Infrastructure
- Length: 50.3 km (31.3 mi)
- Existed: 1966–present

Major junctions
- West end: Road 32E at Libau
- PTH 59 near Libau; PTH 12 at Dencross; PTH 11 at Lac du Bonnet
- East end: PR 502 at Lac du Bonnet

Location
- Country: Canada
- Province: Manitoba
- Rural municipalities: Lac du Bonnet; Brokenhead; St. Clements
- Towns: Lac du Bonnet

Highway system
- Provincial highways in Manitoba; Winnipeg City Routes
← PR 315	→ PR 319

Provincial Road 317 (PR 317) is a provincial road in the Interlake and Eastman regions of the Canadian province of Manitoba. It begins at Libau near Manitoba Highway 59 northeast of Winnipeg and ends in the town of Lac du Bonnet. It is a paved two-lane highway with a distance of 50.3 kilometres (31.3 mi)

== Major intersections ==
Division	Location	km	mi	Destinations	Notes
St. Clements	Libau	0.0	0.0	Road 32E	Western terminus; road continues west as Road 86N
St. Clements		1.3– 1.4	0.81– 0.87	PTH 59 – Grand Beach, Winnipeg	
Brokenhead	Dencross	16.6	10.3	PTH 12 – Grand Beach, Beausejour	
Brokenhead	Dencross	17.0	10.6	Bridge over the Brokenhead River	
Lac du Bonnet	No major junctions				
Town of Lac du Bonnet		49.4	30.7	PTH 11 (La Vérendrye Trail) – Powerview-Pine Falls, Whitemouth	
Town of Lac du Bonnet		50.3	31.3	PR 502 (McArthur Avenue / First Street)	Eastern terminus
1.000 mi = 1.609 km; 1.000 km = 0.621 mi
