= Manitoba Provincial Road 214 =

Provincial road in Manitoba, Canada

Provincial Road 214
- Milner Ridge Road
- PR 214 highlighted in red

Route information
- Maintained by Manitoba Infrastructure
- Length: 25.7 km (16.0 mi)
- Existed: 1966–present

Major junctions
- South end: PTH 44 at Seddons Corner
- North end: PTH 11 near Lac Du Bonnet

Location
- Country: Canada
- Province: Manitoba
- Rural municipalities: Lac du Bonnet

Highway system
- Provincial highways in Manitoba; Winnipeg City Routes
| ← PR 213 | → PR 215 |

Provincial Road 214 (PR 214), also called Milner Ridge Road, is a short provincial road in the province of Manitoba, Canada. It runs through the Agassiz Provincial Forest from PTH 44 at Seddons Corner (east of Beausejour) to PTH 11.

PR 214 provides access to the Milner Ridge Correction Facility, a medium and minimum-security prison operated by the Manitoba Department of Justice. The prison is located on the former CFS Beausejour site, which was a NORAD surveillance base. PR 214 also serves as a shortcut for those travelling between Beausejour and Lac Du Bonnet via PTH 44 and PTH 11.

== Route History ==
PR 214 was originally part of PTH 11 before its current configuration was completed and opened to traffic in 1955.

== Major intersections ==
| Division | Location | km | mi | Destinations | Notes |
|---|---|---|---|---|---|
| Lac du Bonnet | Seddons Corner | 0.0 | 0.0 | PTH 44 – Whitemouth, Winnipeg | Southern terminus; road continues for a short distance as Baker Road |
| Lac du Bonnet | Agassiz Provincial Forest | 9.8 | 6.1 | Correction Facility Road – Milner Ridge Correction Facility | |
| Lac du Bonnet | Agassiz Provincial Forest | 10.4 | 6.5 | PR 435 west | Eastern terminus of PR 435 |
| Lac du Bonnet | | 25.7 | 16.0 | PTH 11 (La Vérendrye Trail) – Lac du Bonnet, Whitemouth | Northern terminus |
1.000 mi = 1.609 km; 1.000 km = 0.621 mi
