= Manitoba Highway 59 =

Provincial road in Manitoba, Canada

Provincial Trunk Highway 59
- Lagemodiere Blvd; Arthur Rd
- PTH 59 highlighted in red

Route information
- Maintained by Manitoba Infrastructure
- Length: 215.3 km (133.8 mi)
- Existed: 1952–present

Major junctions
- South end: US 59 at the U.S. border near Tolstoi
- PTH 23 at La Rochelle; PTH 52 near Tourond; PTH 100 (TCH) in Winnipeg; PTH 1 (TCH) in Winnipeg; PTH 101 near Winnipeg; PTH 44 near Lockport; PTH 4 near East Selkirk; PTH 12 near Grand Marais; PTH 11 near Victoria Beach
- North end: Victoria Beach on Lake Winnipeg

Location
- Country: Canada
- Province: Manitoba
- Rural municipalities: Alexander; De Salaberry; East St. Paul; Emerson – Franklin; Hanover; Ritchot; Springfield; St. Clements; Taché; Victoria Beach
- Major cities: Winnipeg
- Villages: St. Pierre-Jolys

Highway system
- Provincial highways in Manitoba; Winnipeg City Routes
← PTH 57	→ PTH 60

Provincial Trunk Highway 59 (PTH 59) is a major provincial highway in the Canadian province of Manitoba. It runs from the Lancaster-Tolstoi Border Crossing (where it meets with U.S. Highway 59), through the city of Winnipeg, north to 8th Avenue in Victoria Beach on Lake Winnipeg.

== Route description ==
PTH 59 is a four-lane at-grade expressway from Provincial Road 210 south of Île-des-Chênes, through Winnipeg, to the Brokenhead Ojibway Nation, except for a two-kilometre section of six-lane road between the North Perimeter Highway (PTH 101) and Provincial Road 202. The remainder of PTH 59 is a two-lane highway except within the communities of St. Pierre-Jolys and St. Malo.

PTH 59 coincides with City Route 20 (Lagimodière Boulevard) as it runs through the eastern part of Winnipeg. North of the city, PTH 59 is the main route to Grand Beach and the eastern side of Lake Winnipeg and part of the La Vérendrye Trail. To the south, PTH 59 is effectively the modern-day successor to the original Crow Wing Trail as one of two main roads between Winnipeg and the United States border, serving as an alternative to PTH 75. PTH 59 is also a main route on both sides of Winnipeg for rural Manitobans commuting to work in the city.

== Major intersections ==
Division	Location	km	mi	Destinations	Notes
Emerson – Franklin		0.0	0.0	US 59 south – Lancaster, Thief River Falls	Continuation into Minnesota
Emerson – Franklin		0.0	0.0	Canada–United States border at Lancaster–Tolstoi Border Crossing	
Emerson – Franklin	Tolstoi	8.5	5.3	PR 209 east – Gardenton	
Emerson – Franklin		15.2	9.4	PR 201 – Dominion City, Vita	
Emerson – Franklin	Rosa	27.1	16.8	Road 16 N	Former PR 217 west
Emerson – Franklin		30.6	19.0	PR 216 north – Grunthal, Kleefeld, New Bothwell	
De Salaberry	St. Malo	41.1	25.5	De La Grotte Avenue – St. Malo Provincial Park	
De Salaberry	St. Malo	41.3	25.7	PR 218 south	
De Salaberry	St. Malo	42.0	26.1	PR 403 east	
De Salaberry	La Rochelle	45.7	28.4	PTH 23 west – Morris	
De Salaberry		54.1	33.6	PR 205 east – Grunthal	South end of PR 205 concurrency
Village of St-Pierre-Jolys		55.3	34.4	PR 205 west – Aubigny, Rosenort	North end of PR 205 concurrency
De Salaberry		62.3	38.7	Road 34 N (Otterburne Road) – Otterburne, Kleefeld	Former PR 303
Hanover		65.8	40.9	PTH 52 east – Steinbach, Mitchell, La Broquerie	
Hanover		68.9	42.8	PR 305 west – Ste. Agathe	
Hanover		73.8	45.9	PR 311 – Niverville, Blumenort, New Bothwell	Traffic lights
Taché / Ritchot	No major junctions				
Ritchot		82.0	51.0	PR 210 – St. Adolphe, Landmark, Ste. Anne	
Ritchot	Ile des Chênes	85.5	53.1	Leclaire Road / Dumaine Road	
Ritchot		87.1	54.1	PR 405 east / Van Gorp Road – Lorette	
Ritchot		90.7	56.4	Oak Grove Road – Grande Pointe	Former PR 300 north
Ritchot		94.7	58.8	Hallama Drive / South Side Road – Grande Pointe	PR 300 south
Ritchot		95.8	59.5	Crosses the Red River Floodway	
Ritchot		96.3	59.8	Prairie Grove Road west	Interchange
City of Winnipeg		98.0– 98.8	60.9– 61.4	PTH 100 (TCH) (Perimeter Highway) / Route 20 begins	Interchange, PTH 100 exit 8; south end Route 20 concurrency
City of Winnipeg		101.2	62.9	Abinojii Mikanah (Route 165 west)	Traffic lights
City of Winnipeg		102.9	63.9	PTH 1 (TCH) / Fermor Avenue (Route 135)	Traffic lights
City of Winnipeg		106.5	66.2	Marion Street (Route 115 west)	Traffic lights; south end of Route 115 concurrency
City of Winnipeg		107.0	66.5	Dugald Road (Route 115 east)	Traffic lights; north end of Route 115 concurrency
City of Winnipeg		108.4	67.4	Regent Avenue (Route 37)	Traffic lights
City of Winnipeg		110.1	68.4	Concordia Avenue	Interchange
City of Winnipeg		112.1	69.7	Route 17 west (Chief Peguis Trail)	Traffic lights
City of Winnipeg		114.4	71.1	Route 20 ends	Winnipeg city limits; north end of Route 20 concurrency
East St. Paul		114.4– 115.5	71.1– 71.8	PTH 101 (Perimeter Highway)	Interchange
East St. Paul		117.1	72.8	PR 202 north (Birds Hill Road) – Birds Hill	Traffic lights; former PTH 59 north
Springfield		119.2	74.1	Crosses the Red River Floodway	
Springfield		119.5	74.3	Oasis Road	Interchange; northbound exit and southbound entrance
East St. Paul		120.7	75.0	PR 213 east (Garven Road) – Hazelridge, Oakbank	Traffic lights
St. Clements		126.6	78.7	Birds Hill Provincial Park	Interchange
St. Clements		134.8	83.8	PTH 44 – Lockport, Beausejour	Interchange
St. Clements		139.5	86.7	PR 509 west – Selkirk	
St. Clements		142.0	88.2	PR 212 – East Selkirk	
St. Clements		145.0	90.1	PR 435 east	
St. Clements		147.8	91.8	PTH 4 west – Selkirk	
St. Clements		151.8	94.3	PR 508 south	La Vérendrye Trail branches west onto PR 508
St. Clements		160.3	99.6	PR 317 – Libau, Lac du Bonnet	
Brokenhead Ojibway Nation	Scanterbury	172.5	107.2	Bear Road	Traffic lights
St. Clements		177.5	110.3	PR 319 west – Patricia Beach	
St. Clements		179.3	111.4	Stead Road east	Former PR 304 north; former PR 219 east
Alexander / St. Clements		182.5	113.4	PTH 12 south – Beausejour, Ste. Anne, Steinbach	South end of PTH 12 concurrency
Alexander / St. Clements		184.5	114.6	PR 304 north / PR 500 north – Beaconia, Powerview-Pine Falls	
Alexander / St. Clements		192.8	119.8	PTH 12 north – Grand Beach	North end of PTH 12 concurrency
Alexander		205.9	127.9	PTH 11 south – Powerview-Pine Falls	La Vérendrye Trail branches east onto PTH 11
Victoria Beach		213.7	132.8	PR 504 north – Sandy Bay, Wanasing Beach	
Victoria Beach		215.3	133.8	Eighth Avenue / Arthur Road	Northern terminus; road continues as Arthur Road
1.000 mi = 1.609 km; 1.000 km = 0.621 mi: Concurrency terminus; Incomplete access; Route transition

== Related routes ==
=== Provincial Road 319 ===
Provincial Road 319
- Location: Patricia Beach Provincial Park
- Length: 6.0 km (3.7 mi)
- Existed: 1966–present

Provincial Road 319 (PR 319) is a 6.0-kilometre-long (3.7 mi) east–west spur off of PTH 59 in the Rural Municipality of St. Clements, serving as the only road access into Patricia Beach Provincial Park, where it dead ends along the coastline of Lake Winnipeg. It is entirely a two-lane gravel road.

Division	Location	km	mi	Destinations	Notes
St. Clements	Patricia Beach Provincial Park	0.0	0.0	Dead end at Lake Winnipeg	Western terminus
St. Clements		6.0	3.7	PTH 59 – Grand Beach, Winnipeg	Eastern terminus
1.000 mi = 1.609 km; 1.000 km = 0.621 mi

=== Provincial Road 504 ===
Provincial Road 504
- Location: Rural Municipality of Victoria Beach
- Length: 2.3 km (1.4 mi)
- Existed: 1966–present

Provincial Road 504 (PR 504) is a short 2.3-kilometre-long (1.4 mi) north-south spur of PTH 59 in the Rural Municipality of Victoria Beach, connecting the communities of Victoria Beach itself and Wanasing Beach with both the community and beach of Sandy Bay on Lake Winnipeg. Between PTH 59 and the intersection with Olafsson Boulevard and Hampton Road, PR 504 is a paved two-lane highway. Past this intersection though, it is a narrow single lane gravel road for the 0.1 kilometres (0.062 mi) to the dead end at the beach on Lake Winnipeg. Throughout its length, PR 504 travels through a mix of woodlands and lakeside neighbourhoods.

Division	Location	km	mi	Destinations	Notes
Victoria Beach	Wanasing Beach	0.0	0.0	PTH 59 (Arthur Road) – Victoria Beach, Winnipeg; Arthur Road E – Wanasing Beach	Southern terminus; road continues as PTH 59 south
Victoria Beach	Sandy Bay	2.2	1.4	Olafsson Boulevard / Hampton Road – Sandy Bay Beach	Southern end of unpaved section
Victoria Beach	Sandy Bay	2.3	1.4	Dead end at Lake Winnipeg	Northern terminus; northern end of unpaved section
1.000 mi = 1.609 km; 1.000 km = 0.621 mi

=== Provincial Road 508 ===
Provincial Road 508
- La Vérendrye Trail, St. Peters Road, Road 82N
- Location: East Selkirk
- Length: 12.9 km (8.0 mi)
- Existed: 1966–present

Provincial Road 508 (PR 508), known as St. Peters Road for the majority of its length, is a 12.9-kilometre-long (8.0 mi) north–south spur of PTH 59 in the Rural Municipality of St. Clements, providing access to the town of East Selkirk and St. Peter Dynevor Church Provincial Historic Site. The highway also runs along a portion of the La Vérendrye Trail for its entire length.

PR 508 begins at the centre of East Selkirk at an intersection with PR 212 (Colville Road) along the banks of Cooks Creek, with the La Vérendrye Trail continuing west along PR 212 northbound. It heads north along St. Peters Road to travel through neighbourhoods for a few kilometres before leaving East Selkirk and crossing Dubas Creek. As it passes by the St. Peter Dynevor Church Provincial Historic Site, the highest begins following the east bank of the Red River, crossing PTH 4 before travelling through rural areas. Now turning away from the river via a sudden right turn onto Road 82N, travelling along the north side of Peguis 1H reserve of the Peguis First Nation for a few kilometres before coming to an end at a junction with PTH 59. La Vérendrye Trail continues east along PTH 59 northbound. The entire length of PR 508 is a paved, two-lane highway.

Division	Location	km	mi	Destinations	Notes
St. Clements	East Selkirk	0.0	0.0	PR 212 (Colville Road / La Vérendrye Trail west) – Highland Glen, Selkirk	Southern terminus; La Vérendrye Trail follows PR 212 northbound
St. Clements		2.6	1.6	Bridge over the Dubas Creek	
St. Clements		5.0	3.1	Stone Church Road – St. Peter Dynevor Church Provincial Historic Site	
St. Clements		5.7	3.5	PTH 4 to PTH 59 – Selkirk	
St. Clements		12.9	8.0	PTH 59 (La Vérendrye Trail east) – Grand Beach, Winnipeg	Northern terminus; La Vérendrye Trail follows PTH 59 northbound
1.000 mi = 1.609 km; 1.000 km = 0.621 mi

=== Provincial Road 509 ===
Provincial Road 509
- CIL Road
- Location: Rural Municipality of St. Clements
- Length: 1.6 km (0.99 mi)

Provincial Road 509 (PR 509), also known as CIL Road, is a short 1.6-kilometre-long (0.99 mi) east–west spur of PTH 59, serving as a connection to the city of Selkirk via PR 204 (La Vérendrye Trail). It is entirely a paved two-lane highway, and includes a railway crossing near its western end.

Between 1966 and 1968, PR 509 existed on an entirely different route, along a 11-kilometre-long (6.8 mi) spur of PR 308 in the Northwest Angle Provincial Forest, providing access to both Moose Lake and Birch Point Provincial Parks, as well as the coastline of Buffalo Bay on Lake of the Woods. Though now unnumbered, the road still exists as a two-lane gravel road and is still in use.

Division	Location	km	mi	Destinations	Notes
St. Clements		0.0	0.0	PR 204 (Henderson Highway / West Road / La Vérendrye Trail) – Lockport, Selkirk	Western terminus
St. Clements		1.6	0.99	PTH 59 – Grand Beach, Winnipeg	Eastern terminus; road continues east as CIL Road
1.000 mi = 1.609 km; 1.000 km = 0.621 mi

== See also ==
- Winnipeg Route 20
