= Manitoba Royal Canadian Mounted Police =

RCMP federal policing in Manitoba

Coordinates: 49.8847°N 97.1790°W

RCMP "D" Division

Jurisdictional structure
- Operations jurisdiction: Manitoba

Operational structure
- Headquarters: 1091 Portage Avenue, Winnipeg, Manitoba
- Police Constables: 1000
- Civilians: 450
- Agency executive: Scott McMurchy, Assistant Commissioner

Website
- rcmp-grc.gc.ca/mb

The D Division is the division of the Royal Canadian Mounted Police responsible for federal policing in Manitoba and, at times, northwestern Ontario. Headquartered in Winnipeg, the division is commanded by Assistant Commissioner Scott McMurchy and consists of 1089 police officers and 438 support staff.

As one of the 15 divisions of the RCMP, the D Division's federal policing duties include combating organized crime, border integrity, and VIP protection, among others.

D Division is also contracted by the Province of Manitoba to act as the provincial police. In that role, the division provides front-line policing to towns and rural areas which have not established their own police services. In addition, some municipalities which are responsible under Manitoba law for their own policing have chosen to contract the RCMP to provide that service. As a result, the division provides front-line policing services to over 500,000 people spread over nearly all of Manitoba's 650,000 square kilometres, including some of Canada's most remote areas.

== History ==
The D Division was created around 1874 by the North-West Mounted Police (NWMP)—predecessor of the Royal Canadian Mounted Police (RCMP)—when its 275 officers and men were divided into six troops (i.e., divisions), identified by letters 'A' through 'F'.

Initially located in Fort Dufferin, Manitoba, D Division was stationed at the following locations between 1876 and 1919: Fort Macleod, Alberta (1876-1877), Shoal Lake (1878-1879), Battleford, Saskatchewan (1880-1886), Fort Macleod (1886), Fort Steele, British Columbia (1887-1889), and Fort Macleod (1889-1919). In 1919, D Division was assigned to Winnipeg, Manitoba, where it remains today.

In 1932, the RCMP moved into a building on Winnipeg's Portage Avenue that was constructed in 1927 as a home for the Salvation Army's William Booth Territorial Training College. The building was eventually replaced by the structure that stands today as the D Division headquarters. This new facility was opened between 31 May and 1 June 1979, and cost around $12 million.

== Detachments ==
The RCMP in Manitoba provides policing services via 80 detachments, about 1000 regular members, and about 450 civilian and public service employees.

The division's federal units are almost all based out of the division's headquarters building in Winnipeg, but with an Integrated Border Enforcement Team based out of Altona.

=== Provincial policing ===
The Province of Manitoba contracts the RCMP D Division to act as the provincial police. In that role, the division provides front-line policing to towns and rural areas which have not established their own police services. In addition, some municipalities that are responsible under Manitoba law for their own policing have chosen to contract the RCMP to provide that service. As a result, the division provides front-line policing services to over 500,000 people spread over nearly all of Manitoba's 650,000 km^{2} (250,000 sq mi), including some of Canada's most remote areas.

The province is divided into three geographical districts; north, west, and east, and each is commanded by a Superintendent. The districts are then divided into a total of 80 detachments. Some detachments are amalgamated, pooling resources together to serve a wider area more efficiently. The offices of an amalgamated detachments are referred to as a host and satellite offices.

The division's provincial policing resources are mainly spread around the province, with some specialty and support units based out of the headquarters building. Few detachments within the division have the resources to have police officers on-duty 24 hours a day, but instead rely on on-call officers to respond during quieter hours. Telephone calls to the RCMP within Manitoba are often routed to the Operational Communication Centre, located within the headquarters building. The OCC is staffed 24 hours a day, 7 days a week, 365 days a year with telecommunications operators, specialized civilians who are trained to take calls from the public and dispatch police officers.

In addition to detachments, the RCMP maintains community offices in smaller communities which provides office space for RCMP members to use on a temporary basis, and patrol cabins which provide overnight accommodations to RCMP members travelling to remote communities where there is no permanent policing presence.

The following communities have a detachment or satellite office of a larger detachment area. (Winnipeg is home to the Manitoba Headquarters on Portage Avenue, as well as the Winnipeg Airport detachment.)

Areas without all-weather road access, instead accessible only by ice road, air, boat, or rail are denoted by a *, while district headquarters are in bold.

==== North District ====
- Chemawawin (office in Easterville)
- Churchill*
- Cranberry Portage
- Cross Lake
- Flin Flon
- Gillam
- Gods Lake Narrows*
- Grand Rapids
- Island Lake* (office in Stevenson Island)
- Leaf Rapids
- Lynn Lake
- Moose Lake
- Nelson House
- Norway House
- Oxford House*
- Pukatawagan*
- Shamattawa*
- Snow Lake
- The Pas
- **Thompson**
- Wabowden

==== West District ====
- Amaranth
- Boissevain
- Brandon (office in RM of Cornwallis)
- Carberry
- Carman (also serves Altona)
- **Dauphin** (also serves Ethelbert and Grandview)
- Deloraine
- Elphinstone
- Hamiota
- Killarney
- Manitou (also serves Crystal City)
- Melita
- Minnedosa
- Morden
- Neepawa
- Portage La Prairie
- Reston
- Roblin
- Russell (also serves Rossburn * Russell)
- Shoal Lake
- Souris
- Ste. Rose du Lac (also serves McCreary)
- Swan River
- Treherne
- Virden
- Wasagaming
- Winnipegosis

==== East District ====
- Arborg
- Ashern
- Beausejour
- Berens River*
- Bloodvein
- Emerson
- Falcon Beach
- Fisher Branch
- Gimli
- Grand Marais (office in RM of St. Clements)
- Gypsumville
- Headingley
- Lac du Bonnet
- Little Grand Rapids*
- Lundar
- Morris
- Oakbank
- Peguis (office in Fisher Branch)
- Pinawa
- Poplar River*
- Powerview
- Red River North (formerly East St. Paul)
- **Selkirk**
- Sprague
- St. Pierre-Jolys
- Steinbach
- Stonewall
- Teulon
- Whitemouth
- Winnipeg Airport

==== Former detachments ====
- Altona — this area is now served by the detachment in Carman (west district)
- Crystal City — this area is now served by the detachment in Manitou (west district)
- Ethelbert — this area is now served by the detachment in Dauphin (west district)
- Gladstone — this area is now served by the detachment in Neepawa (west district)
- Grandview — this area is now served by the detachment in Dauphin (west district)
- McCreary — this area is now served by the detachment in Ste. Rose du Lac (west district)
- Opaskwayak Cree Nation — policing transferred to the Manitoba First Nations Police Service in 2021
- Rossburn — this area is now served by the detachment in Russell (west district)

== Support Units ==
The division houses units composed of police officers trained in specialized policing skills to provide support to the rest of the division or other police services within Manitoba under the division's duties as the provincial police. Some of these units include:

- Emergency Response Team — providing advanced training and equipment to deal with situations such as armed and barricaded persons or high-risk search warrants
- Explosives Disposal Unit — providing disposal of found explosives and improvised explosive devices, along with chemical, biological, or radiological dissemination devices, and post-blast investigations
- Forensic Identification Services — collecting forensic evidence at crime scenes
- Search and Rescue — locating lost people in remote areas; Search and Rescue Manitoba (SARMAN) is a shared responsibility between D Division, Manitoba's Office of the Fire Commissioner, and the Emergency Measures Organization.
- Technological Crime — collecting evidence from technological devices
- Tactical Troop — providing crowd control
- Underwater Recovery Team — police diving unit for locating bodies or evidence underwater

== Transportation ==
Policing such a large and often remote area requires presents transportation challenges. While the division employs the use of traditional police cars, the division also has many pick-ups, some equipped to run on train tracks, boats, snowmobiles, quads, and three Pilatus PC-12 aircraft, two stationed in Winnipeg and one in Thompson.
