= Lac du Bonnet =

Lac du Bonnet may refer to:

- Lac du Bonnet, Manitoba, a community in Canada
  - Lac du Bonnet (electoral district)
  - Lac du Bonnet Airport

== See also ==
- Rural Municipality of Lac du Bonnet
