= Manitoba Provincial Road 435 =

Provincial road in Manitoba, Canada

Provincial Road 435

Route information
- Maintained by Department of Infrastructure
- Length: 38.8 km (24.1 mi)
- Existed: 1966–present

Major junctions
- West end: PTH 59 near East Selkirk
- PTH 12 near Ladywood

Location
- Country: Canada
- Province: Manitoba
- Rural municipalities: St. Clements, Brokenhead, Lac du Bonnet

Highway system
- Provincial highways in Manitoba; Winnipeg City Routes
← PR 433	→ PR 440

Provincial Road 435 (PR 435) is a 38.8-kilometre-long (24.1 mi) east–west highway Interlake and Eastman regions of Manitoba. It connects the town of East Selkirk with Ladywood, the Agassiz Provincial Forest, and the Milner Ridge Correctional Centre.

== Route description ==
PR 435 begins in the Rural Municipality of St. Clements just outside the town of East Selkirk at an intersection with PTH 59. It heads east through rural farmland for several kilometres, traversing a small switchback before entering the Rural Municipality of Brokenhead. The highway has an intersection with PTH 12 just south of the hamlet of Ladywood before going through a couple of curves as it crosses a bridge over the Brokenhead River. After traversing a few more kilometres of farmland, PR 435 begins rising slightly in elevation as it enters the woodlands of both the Agassiz Provincial Forest and the Rural Municipality of Lac du Bonnet. The highway passes by the Milner Ridge Pond before coming to an end at a junction with PR 214 (Milner Ridge Road) near the Milner Ridge Correctional Centre. The entire length of PR 435 is a two-lane gravel road.

== Major intersections ==
Division	Location	km	mi	Destinations	Notes
St. Clements		0.0	0.0	PTH 59 – Winnipeg, Grand Beach	Western terminus; road continues west as Road 78N
Brokenhead		9.9	6.2	Road 35E – Tyndall	Former PR 510 south
Brokenhead		21.3	13.2	PTH 12 – Grand Beach, Beausejour	
Brokenhead		25.7	16.0	Bridge over the Brokenhead River	
Lac du Bonnet	Agassiz Provincial Forest	38.8	24.1	PR 214 (Milner Ridge Road) – Lac du Bonnet, Seddons Corner	Eastern terminus
1.000 mi = 1.609 km; 1.000 km = 0.621 mi
