= Whitemouth Lake =

Lake in Manitoba, Canada

- Location in Manitoba Whitemouth Lake (Canada)
- Location: Eastman Manitoba
- Coordinates: 49°16′40″N 95°41′50″W
- Primary outflows: Whitemouth River
- Basin countries: Canada
- Islands: 3

Whitemouth Lake is a freshwater lake in the Eastman Region of Manitoba, located close to the United States and Ontario border of the southeast of the province.

The lake is situated in the Rural Municipality of Reynolds with the Rural Municipality of Piney on its western shore. The lake feeds the Whitemouth River, which is a large tributary of the Winnipeg River, while the lake itself is primarily fed by underground springs. The lake contains the Whitemouth Island Ecological Reserve, which is a relatively untouched and pristine example of a Great Lakes hardwood forest. Whitemouth is a large but shallow lake in Eastern Manitoba. The lake is a popular recreational fishery for walleye, though in recent years, as a result of shallow depths and high nutrient levels, the lake can be susceptible to winter die offs of the fish population as the oxygen supplies dwindle in the lake.

== See also ==
- List of lakes of Manitoba
