= Elma, Manitoba =

Elma
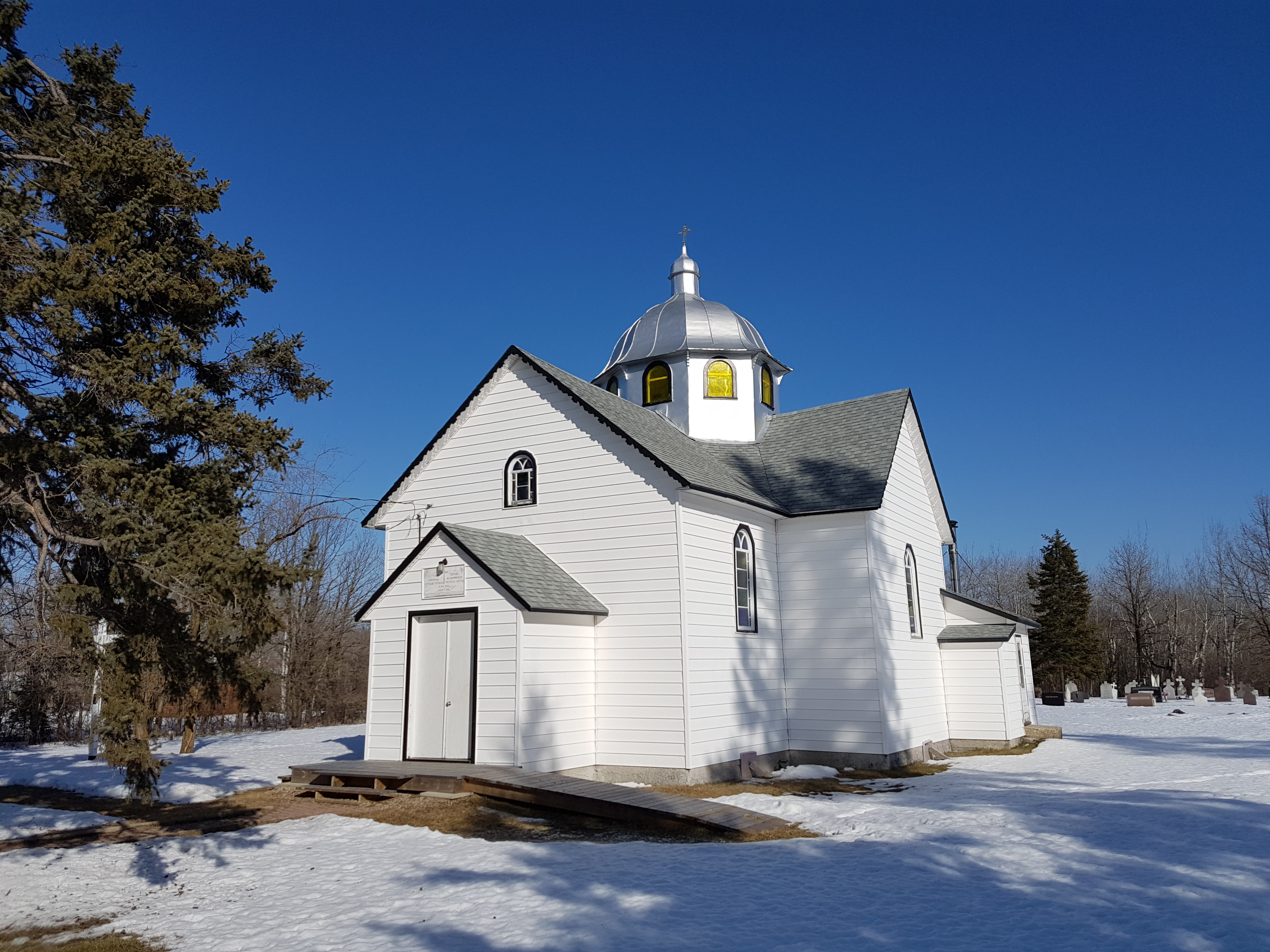
- Holy Cross Ukrainian Catholic Church in Elma.

- Location of Elma in Manitoba
- Coordinates: 49°52′30″N 95°54′29″W
- Country: Canada
- Province: Manitoba
- Region: Eastman
- Rural Municipality: Whitemouth

Government
  - MP (Provencher): Ted Falk (CPC)
  - MLA (La Verendrye): Konrad Narth (PC)

Area
  - Total: 25.59 km^{2} (9.88 sq mi)
- Elevation: 282 m (926 ft)
- Time zone: UTC-6 (CST)
  - Summer (DST): UTC-5 (CDT)
- Area codes: 204, 431

Elma, Manitoba, is an unincorporated community of approximately 100 people in southeast Manitoba. It is located on the Whitemouth River, at the junction of Highway 15 and Highway 11 in the Rural Municipality of Whitemouth.

== History ==
The area settlement was originally known as Janow, named after its post office; the name was agreed upon between the store owner, John Giliewich, and the inspector of the post offices. The preferred name, Yaroriw, was turned down as the inspector thought that it might be a difficult name.

The name changed to Elma after the railway was built, when the community became a railway town. This name is said to have originated from a man named Thomas Koivu and his wife Maria, who worked for the Canadian Pacific Railway and had a baby named Elma (1905)—a name the town all decided to adopt as their own. It is more likely, however, that the name was given when the National Transcontinental Railway (a predecessor of the Canadian National Railway) was built through the area in 1905. It was common for small railway towns to be named by the railroad engineers or other planners.

=== Transportation ===
Elma Station was demolished in the late 1960s and a small rail station (hut) was used frequently by people going to isolated cabins in the eastern Whiteshell and northwestern Manitoba. The station hut was removed in 2014 by Canadian National Railway.

List
- Preceding station	Via Rail	Following station
  Winnipeg toward Vancouver	The Canadian	Brereton Lake toward Toronto
  Former services
  Preceding station	Canadian National Railway	Following station
  Lewis toward Vancouver	Main Line	Hoctor toward Montreal

== Life and recreation ==
Elma is central to a large recreational area. Agassiz Forest, Sandilands, Lakes of the Whiteshell, snowmobile trails, and whitewater canoeing, kayaking, are all within a few minutes drive. Property costs in southeastern Manitoba remain at a level relatively low compared with nearby tourist destinations. The town of Whitemouth, a 7-minute drive from Elma, has several conveniences such as a clinic, dentist, pharmacy, hardware store, convenience store, school, RCMP station, credit union, and insurance agency.

The biggest employers in the area are the Canadian National Railways, Sun Gro Horticulture Income Fund, and Seer Logging, while many other residents commute to Winnipeg or Beausejour for work. A hemp plant located 25 minutes from Elma was planned to start up in 2019/2020, and expected to employ up to 200 workers.

== Municipal services and utilities ==
There were several debates in the town over sewer and water being installed over the years. In 2010, a bid by the RM of Whitemouth was quashed by the courts. Most of the residentially-funded opposition was due to the large cost.

In the fall of 2011, the RM of Whitemouth installed a municipal water pipeline—originating in Seven Sisters, 35 kilometres (22 mi) away—for those residents who wanted it. The costs, averaging $13,000 per household, were to be shared between those people and a small government grant. As of 2018, the Municipality passed a bylaw requiring homeowners to hire their own contractor to install water service also including a donation of $9000.00 to the RM plus the cost of a permit. This will mean a new connection will likely be in excess of $15000.00. The RM is presently correcting a decade old problem with invoicing errors and unaccounted usage as ordered by P.U.B. The 2021 Mill-Rate is 19.296.

Garbage Disposal can be done at the Waste Management Facility a short drive from Elma. Regular household waste fees are covered by your property taxes.

Elma did not have any reliable mobile service until September 2019, when the old microwave tower in Whitemouth was retrofitted with Bell MTS (voLTE only) and in 2021, 5G cell equipment. Elma residents report between 2 and 5 bars depending on location and provider. Internet Providers include Xplornet and Bell. Line of sight for these services is required. Another option is satellite internet which has mixed reviews. In June 2025 Valley Fiber began operating in the town providing full fiber optic service.

== See also ==
- Sitar family murders
