= Prawda, Manitoba =

Hamlet in Manitoba

Prawda
- Unincorporated community
- Location within Manitoba
- Coordinates: 49.65083°N 95.79361°W
- Country: Canada
- Province: Manitoba
- Municipality: RM of Reynolds
- First settled: 1907

Population
  - Total: 200
- Area code: 204

Prawda is an unincorporated community in the Rural Municipality of Reynolds, situated a few miles east of Hadashville on the Trans Canada Highway in eastern Manitoba. The population of this community is 200.

The area was settled by Ukrainian, Polish, and Russian settlers starting about 1907. By 1932, there was a post office opened which operated until 1969. The community's name comes from the Polish word prawda, which means 'truth'. The name may have come from Evangeline Andrusko, the postmistress who named the post office after a town of the same name in her native Poland.

A school district was part of the community with the school located on section NE 31-2-6E. Since the closure of Reynolds Elementary School, all students are bussed to Whitemouth, Manitoba.

The area is agricultural and has ties to the forestry industry. The community's amenities include two service stations/convenience stores, a restaurant, a Tesla Supercharger, and a campground. Prawda is also home to a livestock feed store, satellite services, a plumber, nurseries, and a community club.

Residents travel to Whitemouth, Ste. Anne, Steinbach, or Winnipeg for medical needs. Reynolds Fire Department, built in 2005, is located at Prawda. The telephone area code for Prawda is 204.
