= St. Georges, Manitoba =

Coordinates: 50°32′22″N 96°08′56″W

St. Georges is a small community in Manitoba, on the Winnipeg River. It is located in the Rural Municipality of Alexander and home to the municipality's administrative offices. The parish began in 1882 when Father Joachim Allard left from the Fort Alexander Indian reserve to live on the Winnipeg River. He invited residents of Chateauguay Quebec to join him so that they could create a French-Canadian parish in the middle of Manitoba. The first chapel was constructed in 1903 and from then on the area became known as Saint-Georges de Chateauguay parish. The first church built in what is now known as St. Georges was in 1909. In 2003 a monument was built to commemorate the hundredth anniversary of the founding of the parish.

The community is accessed by Manitoba Highway 11, which is part of the La Vérendrye Trail.
