= List of francophone communities in Manitoba =

This is a list of francophone communities in Manitoba, i.e., municipalities and neighbourhoods with a high percentage of French-speakers in the Canadian province of Manitoba.

The provincial average of Manitobans whose mother tongue is French is 2.8%, with a total of 36,740 people in Manitoba who identify French as their mother tongue in 2021. While several communities in these have sizeable French minorities, no municipalities have francophone majorities.

There are several Franco-Manitoban communities throughout Manitoba, although the majority are based in either the Winnipeg Metropolitan Region or the Eastman Region.

The centre of the Franco-Manitoban community is the Saint Boniface neighbourhood of Winnipeg, which also ranks as the largest francophone community in Western Canada.

== Francophone communities ==
Municipality	Type	County, district, or regional municipality	Total population (French and non-French speaking)	Percentage of population whose mother tongue is French
Alexander	Rural municipality	Eastman	3,854	8%
Cartier	Rural municipality	Winnipeg Metropolitan Region	3,344	6%
Cornwallis	Rural municipality	Westman	4,568	4%
De Salaberry	Rural municipality	Eastman	3,918	27%
Emerson-Franklin	Rural municipality	Pembina Valley	2,437	4%
Grey	Rural municipality	Pembina Valley	2,517	16%
Île-des-Chênes	Rural municipality	Eastman	1,606	13%
La Broquerie	Rural municipality	Eastman	6,725	11%
Lac du Bonnet	Rural municipality	Eastman	3,563	5%
Lakeshore	Rural municipality	Parkland	1,186	3%
Lorne	Rural municipality	Pembina Valley	2,904	28%
Macdonald	Rural municipality	Winnipeg Metropolitan Region	8,120	4%
Montcalm	Rural municipality	Pembina Valley	1,278	29%
Morris	Rural municipality	Pembina Valley	3,049	3%
Morris	Town	Pembina Valley	1,975	5%
Niverville	Town	Eastman	5,947	4%
Norfolk-Treherne	Rural municipality	Pembina Valley	1,770	13%
Pinawa	Local government district	Eastman	1,558	3%
Piney	Rural municipality	Eastman	1,843	8%
Powerview-Pine Falls	Town	Eastman	1,239	6%
Reynolds	Rural municipality	Eastman	1,344	4%
Ritchot	Rural municipality	Eastman	7,469	18%
Saint Boniface	Neighbourhood (provincial riding)	Winnipeg	22,345	24.4%
St. François Xavier	Rural municipality	Winnipeg Metropolitan Region	1,449	4%
St. Laurent	Rural municipality	Interlake	1,542	16%
St-Pierre-Jolys	Village	Eastman	1,305	39%
Ste. Anne	Rural municipality	Eastman	5,584	14%
Ste. Anne	Town	Eastman	2,891	21%
Ste. Rose	Rural municipality	Parkland	1,591	19%
Taché	Rural municipality	Eastman	11,916	12%
Victoria	Rural municipality	Central Plains	1,188	5%

A number of small municipalities also have high francophone populations. Small francophone-minority municipalities include: Argyle (4%), Buffalo Point (7%), Ellice-Archie (15%) and Victoria Beach (4%).

== See also ==
- French Canadians
- Geographical distribution of French speakers
- List of municipalities in Manitoba
- Saint Boniface, Winnipeg
