= Big Whiteshell Lake =

Lake in Manitoba, Canada

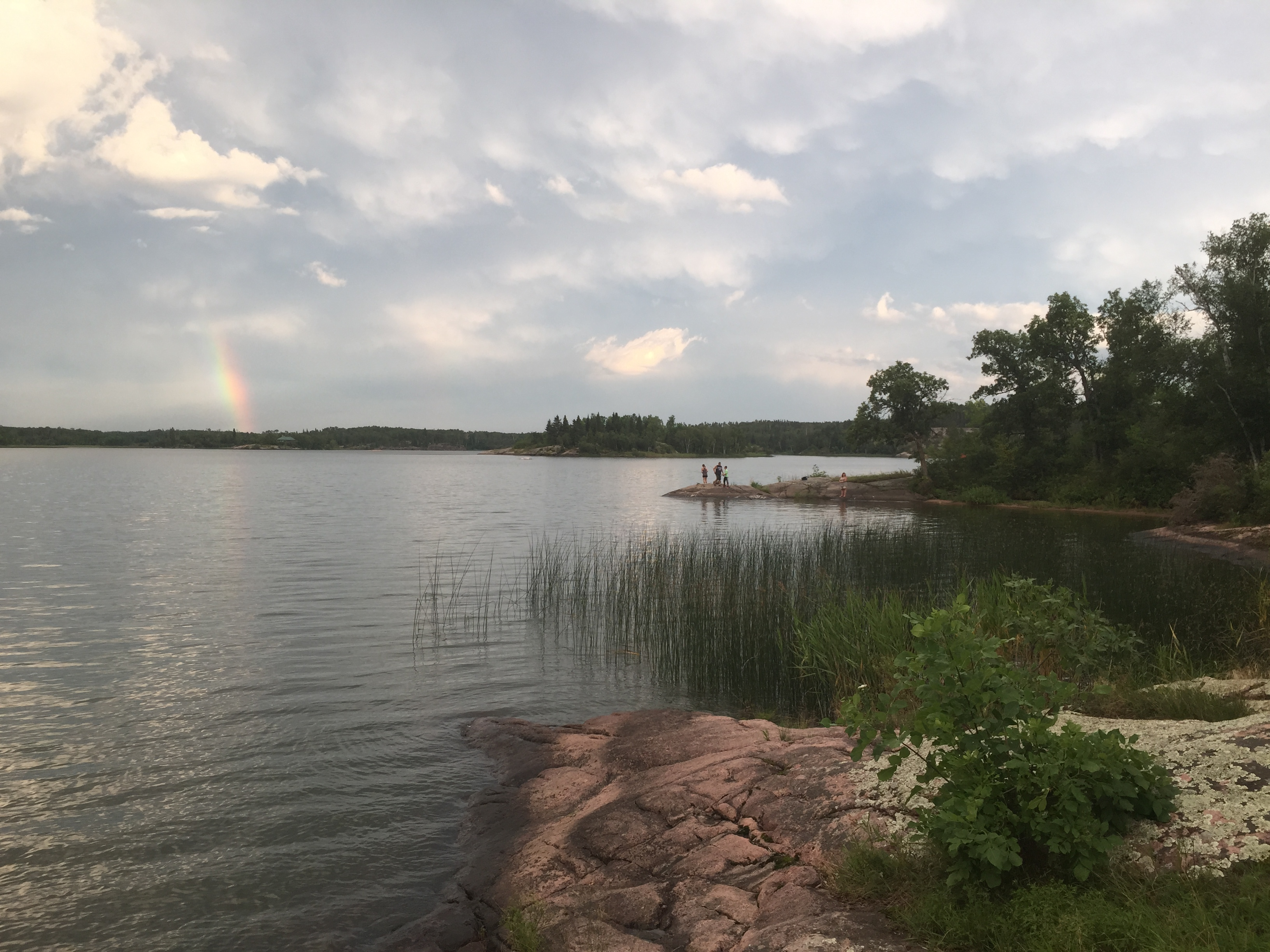
- Big Whiteshell Lake from its shore

- Location of lake in Manitoba, Canada Big Whiteshell Lake (Canada)
- Location: Manitoba, Canada
- Coordinates: 50.0862°N 95.3385°W
- Type: lake

Big Whiteshell Lake is located within the Whiteshell Provincial Park in southeastern Manitoba, Canada. The lake is about 162 kilometres (101 mi) east of Winnipeg at the terminus of Provincial Road 309.

The route from Rennie to Big Whiteshell Lake was originally constructed in the thirties, when workers from the Manitoba Home for Boys at Portage Le. Prairie attempted to cut a road through the Whiteshell Forest Reserve from Rennie to Green Lake. Further development of the lake and surrounding shoreline began in 1957, when the Manitoba Scout Association began looking for a larger campsite to accommodate their growing number of scouts. The provincial government offered a 118 acres (48 ha) tract of land at the southern end of Big Whiteshell Lake, and Camp Alloway was established. The lake is a popular local tourist destination for fishing, hiking, and other summer activities. Manitoba entertainer Larry Clark, better known under his pseudonym Uncle Smokey, composed several novelty campfire songs while working in a fire lookout tower on Big Whiteshell Lake.

== See also ==
- List of lakes of Manitoba
