= Pinawa =

- Local government district
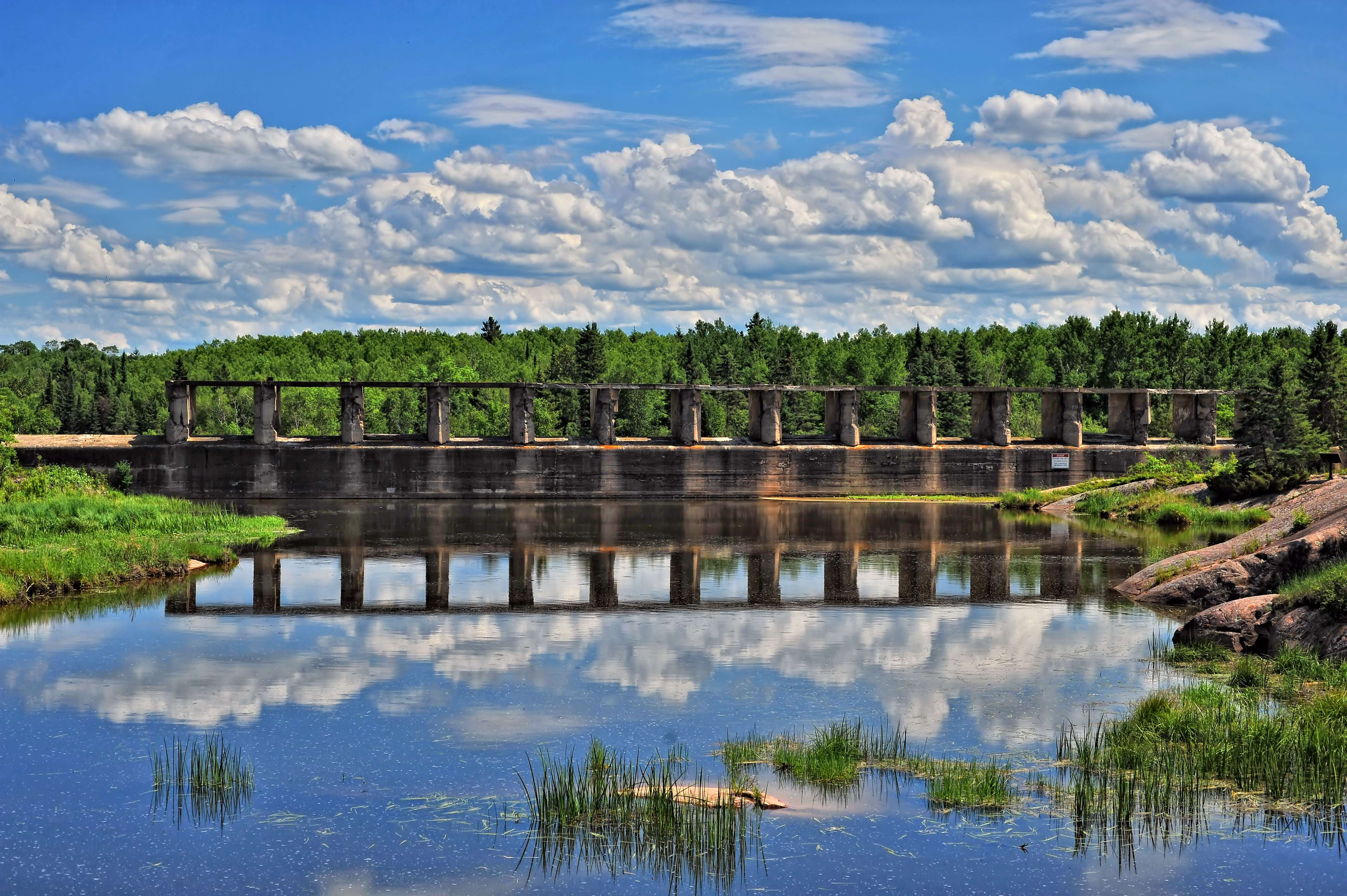
- Decommissioned hydroelectric dam at old Pinawa on the Lee River

- Location of Pinawa in Manitoba
- Coordinates: 50.1489°N 95.8806°W
- Country: Canada
- Province: Manitoba
- Region: Eastman

Government
  - MP (Selkirk—Interlake—Eastman): James Bezan (CPC)

Area
  - Land: 126.51 km^{2} (48.85 sq mi)
  - Urban: 2.14 km^{2} (0.83 sq mi)
- Elevation: 277 m (909 ft)

Population (2021)
  - Total: 1,558
  - Density: 12.3/km^{2} (32/sq mi)
  - Urban: 1,512
  - Urban density: 707/km^{2} (1,830/sq mi)
  - Change 2016–21: ▲3.6%
- Time zone: UTC-6 (CST)
  - Summer (DST): UTC-5 (CDT)
- Postal code: R0E 1L0
- Website: www.pinawa.com

Pinawa is a local government district and small community of 1,331 residents (2016 census) located in southeastern Manitoba, Canada. It is 110 kilometres north-east of Winnipeg. The town is situated on the Canadian Shield within the western boundary of Whiteshell Provincial Park, which lies near the Manitoba-Ontario provincial boundary. Administratively, the town includes the surrounding area, and is officially the Local Government District of Pinawa. Except for a small eastern border with the unorganized area of the Eastman Region, it is surrounded by the Rural Municipalities of Lac du Bonnet to the north and Whitemouth to the south, but is independent of either one. The community lies on the north bank of the Winnipeg River in the southeastern part of the Local Government District.

== History ==
The community of Pinawa was established in 1901 to support the operation of an early hydroelectric generating station but was abandoned in 1951 when the site was shut down.

Pinawa was re-established approximately 10 km from the original hydroelectric town in 1963, when Atomic Energy of Canada Limited (AECL) built the Whiteshell Nuclear Research Establishment (WNRE), later known as Whiteshell Laboratories. The laboratory was created to develop nuclear reactor technology and conduct research in nuclear science, materials and fuels. Its original research program centred on Whiteshell Reactor-1 (WR-1), an experimental organic-cooled pressure-tube reactor representing an early iteration of Canadian nuclear power-reactor technology. WR-1 operated from 1965 to 1985. AECL began decommissioning Whiteshell Laboratories in 1998.

Pinawa was chosen as the site for the research station due to the seismic stability of the area. Pinawa was developed as a planned community which preserved many of the natural features of the site and designated all riverfront property as public reserve.

The Central Mortgage and Housing Corporation originally planned the townsite on behalf of AECL to provide housing and community services for personnel employed at WNRE. Initial service contracts were awarded in 1961, and the town was planned for development over 12 years with an anticipated population of approximately 7,000. In 1962, contracts were award for ground services, 108 housing units, a primary school and a hostel. By the end of 1963, 90 families were living in Pinawa.

The economy of Pinawa is diversifying and now includes small recreation and resort businesses and a number of environmental science firms.

== Geography ==
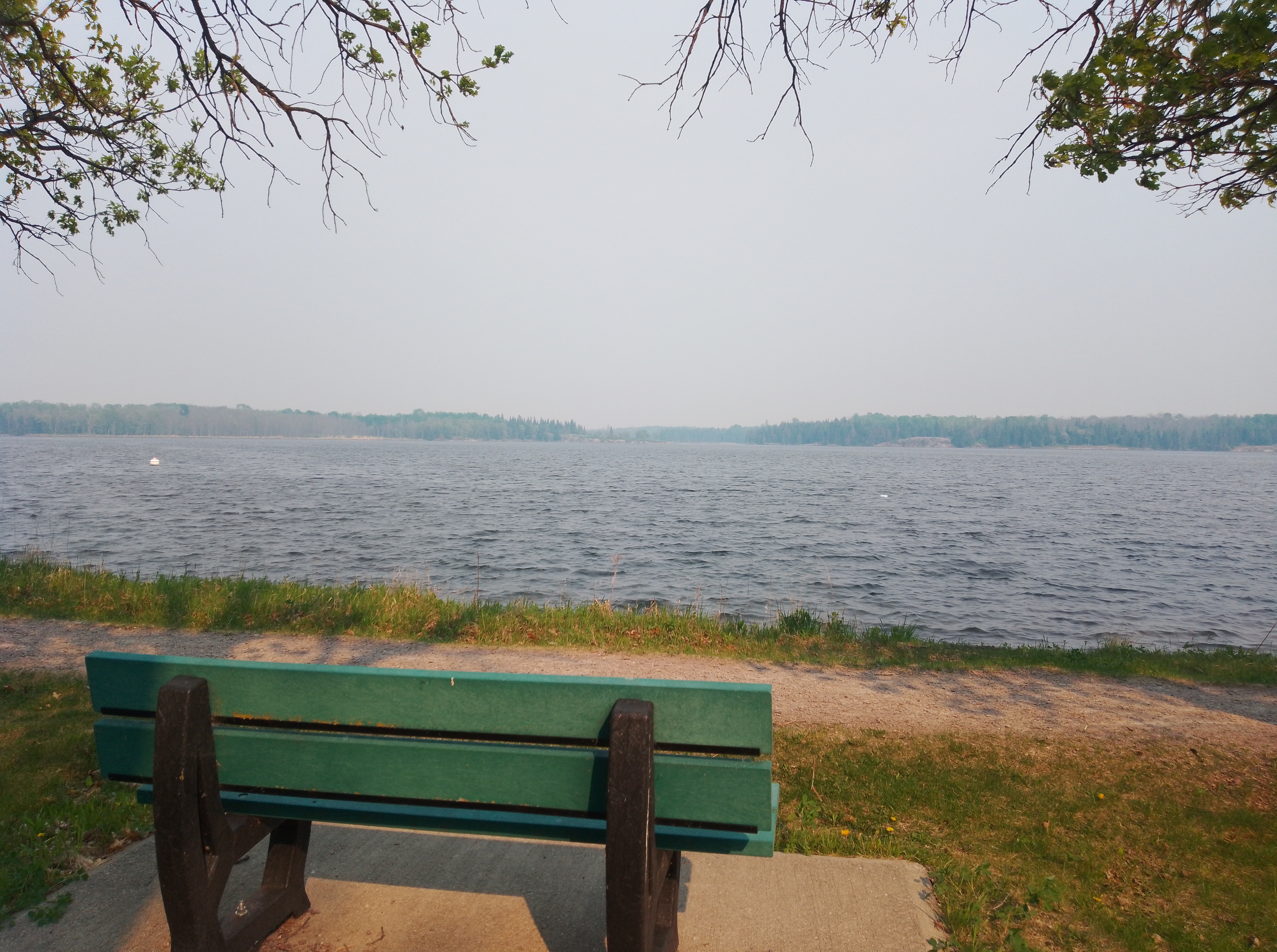
View from Pinawa across the Winnipeg River during 2025 wildfires

Pinawa is located beside the Winnipeg River, which offers access to boating, kayaking, canoeing, and other water recreational activities. Other attractions include an 18-hole golf course, beach, outdoor pool, tennis courts, a curling rink, a hockey arena and many kilometres of cross-country ski trails.

The Trans-Canada Trail runs through the town of Pinawa along the Riverside. Pinawa also hosts the Eastern Manitoba Concert Association or EMCA's concerts, held in the community centre's gymnasium in the secondary school building once a month between October and April.

Pinawa is also home to an abundance of wildlife, including deer, bears, and other species. The people of Pinawa are very familiar with white-tailed deer, although their views on them may differ. Five deer in the backyard is a common sight there, and the town is known as the Deer Capital of Manitoba.

=== Climate ===
Pinawa has a humid continental climate (Köppen climate classification Dfb) with warm summers and severely cold winters. Precipitation is moderate, but is somewhat higher in summer than at other times of the year.

Climate data for Pinawa
Month	Jan	Feb	Mar	Apr	May	Jun	Jul	Aug	Sep	Oct	Nov	Dec	Year
Record high °C (°F)	8 (46)	12 (54)	20 (68)	32.5 (90.5)	34.5 (94.1)	37.5 (99.5)	35 (95)	35.5 (95.9)	36 (97)	27.2 (81.0)	23.3 (73.9)	10 (50)	37.5 (99.5)
Mean daily maximum °C (°F)	−12.6 (9.3)	−7.8 (18.0)	−0.4 (31.3)	9.7 (49.5)	18.1 (64.6)	22.2 (72.0)	24.8 (76.6)	23.7 (74.7)	17.3 (63.1)	9.8 (49.6)	−1.3 (29.7)	−9.8 (14.4)	7.8 (46.0)
Daily mean °C (°F)	−18.1 (−0.6)	−13.7 (7.3)	−6.2 (20.8)	3.4 (38.1)	11.4 (52.5)	16.2 (61.2)	18.9 (66.0)	17.7 (63.9)	11.8 (53.2)	5.1 (41.2)	−4.9 (23.2)	−14.5 (5.9)	2.3 (36.1)
Mean daily minimum °C (°F)	−23.5 (−10.3)	−19.5 (−3.1)	−12 (10)	−2.9 (26.8)	4.7 (40.5)	10.1 (50.2)	12.9 (55.2)	11.6 (52.9)	6.3 (43.3)	0.4 (32.7)	−8.5 (16.7)	−19 (−2)	−3.3 (26.1)
Record low °C (°F)	−43.9 (−47.0)	−47.8 (−54.0)	−39.4 (−38.9)	−28.9 (−20.0)	−13.9 (7.0)	−3.9 (25.0)	−0.6 (30.9)	−1.5 (29.3)	−6.7 (19.9)	−15.5 (4.1)	−34.5 (−30.1)	−40 (−40)	−47.8 (−54.0)
Average precipitation mm (inches)	21.7 (0.85)	16.9 (0.67)	27.3 (1.07)	31.9 (1.26)	59.5 (2.34)	94.5 (3.72)	78.3 (3.08)	71.5 (2.81)	64.1 (2.52)	45.5 (1.79)	30.6 (1.20)	23.7 (0.93)	565.3 (22.26)
Source: Environment Canada

== Demographics ==
In the 2021 Census of Population conducted by Statistics Canada, Pinawa had a population of 1,558 living in 708 of its 797 total private dwellings, a change of 3.6% from its 2016 population of 1,504. With a land area of 126.51 km^{2} (48.85 sq mi), it had a population density of 12.3/km^{2} (31.9/sq mi) in 2021.

== Infrastructure ==
Pinawa has a hospital with 24 hour emergency service, doctors' offices, and an ambulance station. There is a small shopping centre with a post office, credit union, grocery store, bakery, hairdresser, and the offices. The town also has a motel, a conference centre, and an art gallery.

== Education ==
Pinawa has two schools: F.W. Gilbert Elementary School for students in Kindergarten up to grade six, with about 85 students, and Pinawa Secondary School for grades 7–12, with about 110 students. The schools of Pinawa comprise their own school district, the School District of Whiteshell.

Pinawa Secondary School is located near the elementary school. It provides an outdoor education program involving the surrounding wildnerness. Extracurriculars include basketball, soccer, volleyball, badminton, travel club, competitions including Reach For The Top, and community service including the LIVE volunteer group. The school's sports teams are known as the Pinawa Panthers.

Pinawa was selected as host for one day of the Kraft Celebration Tour during the summer of 2010, which saw Dan O'Toole and Jay Onrait host TSN's SportsCentre in the town on August 23. The town also received a cheque for $25,000 from Kraft Canada which went towards renovating their local rink, the Orville Acres Arena.

== Notable people ==
- Robin Black, MMA commentator, musician
- Andrew Davidson, writer

== See also ==
- List of francophone communities in Manitoba
