= Whitemouth Falls Provincial Park =

Provincial park in Manitoba, Canada

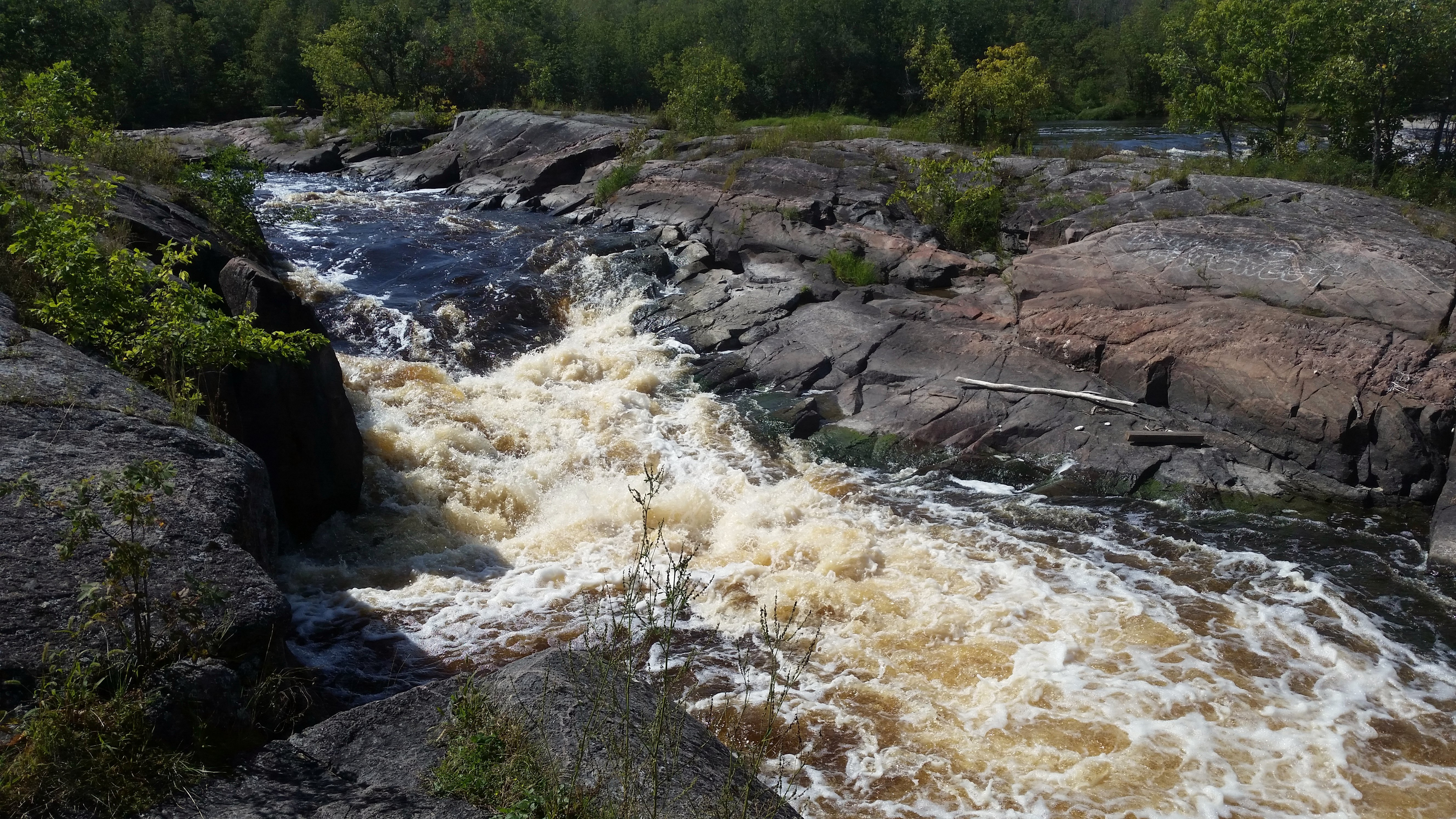

- Location within Manitoba
- Interactive map of Whitemouth Falls Provincial Park
- Location: Manitoba, Canada
- Nearest town: Seven Sisters Falls, Manitoba
- Coordinates: 50°6′38″N 96°1′10″W
- Area: 483.34 ha (1,194.4 acres)
- Established: 1974
- Governing body: Government of Manitoba

Whitemouth Falls Provincial Park is a provincial park located where the Whitemouth River joins the Winnipeg River in Manitoba, Canada. It was designated as a Provincial Park in 1974.

Significant archaeological assets are found within the park including three burial grounds.

The Seven Sisters Generating Station built in 1931 on the Winnipeg River can be easily seen from the park.

Angling is a popular park activity with catch including walleye, lake whitefish and northern pike. Other fish present in the park waters include sauger, rock bass, yellow perch, catfish and mooneye.

The park is 4.83 square kilometres (1.86 sq mi) in size. Its boundaries were extended in 2007 to include an additional 4.3 square kilometres (1.7 sq mi) of black spruce and tamarack bog on the north side of the Winnipeg River while reducing the area on the south side of the river by 1.21 square kilometres (0.47 sq mi). This removed some areas thought to be of lower ecological value while adding protection to habitat used by great gray owls.

The park is located in the Pinawa ecodistrict within the Lake of the Woods ecoregion. This ecoregion is part of the Boreal Shield ecozone.

== See also ==
- List of protected areas of Manitoba
