= Whitemouth River =

River in Manitoba, Canada

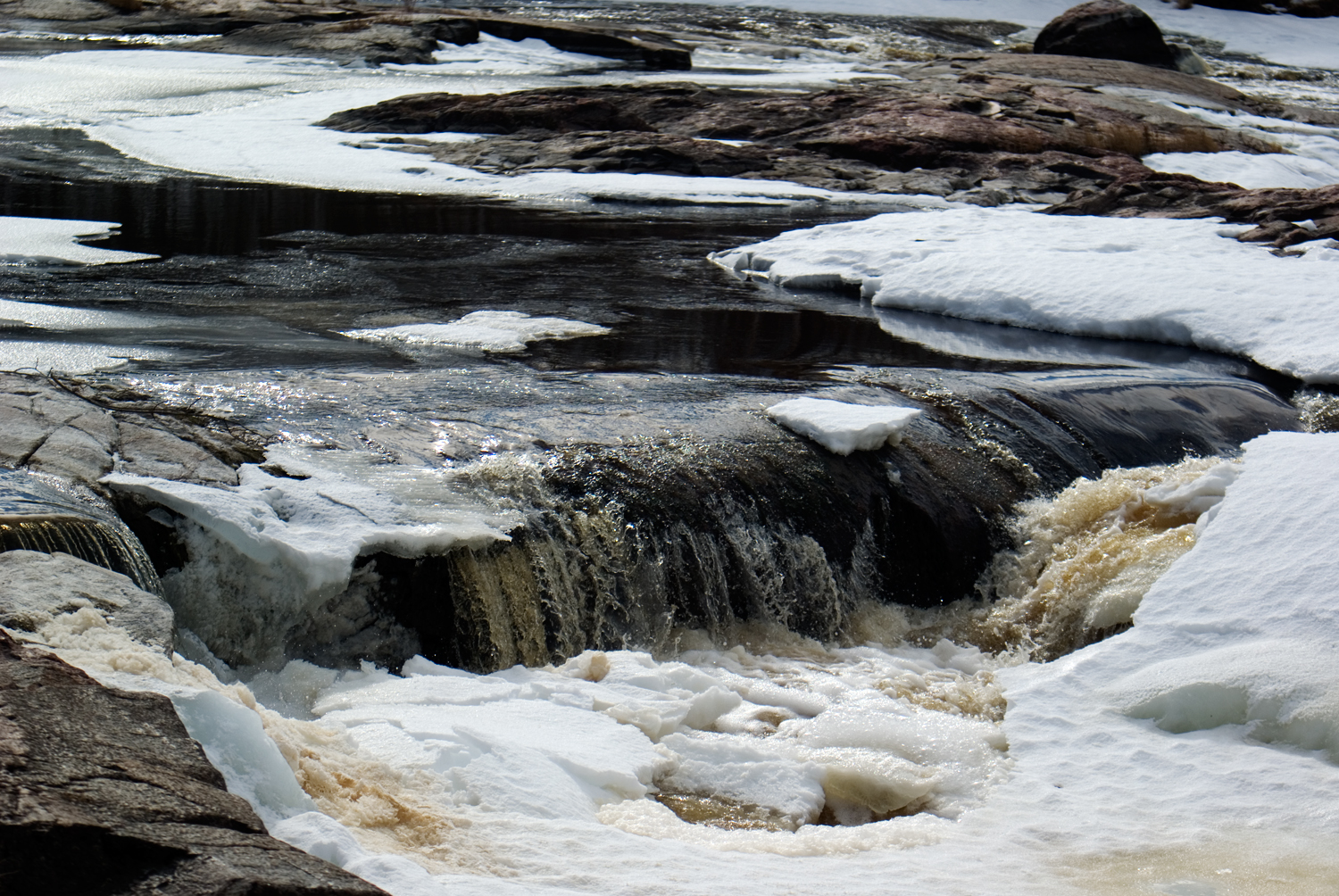

Location
- Country: Canada
- Province: Manitoba

Physical characteristics
- Source: Whitewater Lake
  - coordinates: 49°16′21″N 96°37′10″W
  - elevation: 348 m (1,142 ft)
- Mouth: Winnipeg River
  - location: Seven Sisters Falls, Manitoba
  - coordinates: 50°07′18″N 96°02′05″W
  - elevation: 257 m (843 ft)
- Basin size: 4,464 km^{2} (1,724 sq mi)
- Discharge
  - location: Whitemouth, Manitoba, 20 kilometres (12 mi) above the mouth
  - average: 15.34 m^{3}/s (542 cu ft/s)
  - minimum: 0.009 m^{3}/s (0.32 cu ft/s)
  - maximum: 290 m^{3}/s (10,000 cu ft/s)

Basin features
- Tributaries
  - right: Birch River

The Whitemouth River is located in southeastern Manitoba, Canada. The mouth of the river empties into the Winnipeg River system at the Whitemouth Falls Provincial Park.

The Whitemouth River is fed by Whitemouth Lake which is located in a remote forested area just north of the border between the United States and Canada. Whitemouth Lake feeds the river year round, along with many wetlands throughout the Sandilands Provincial Forest area. The river runs north and crosses the Trans-Canada Highway where it enters an area of farmlands. The towns of Seven Sisters, River Hills, Elma, Whitemouth, and Hadashville are located along the river.

Several rapids along the river attract whitewater canoeists and kayakers. There are twelve navigable whitewater features along the river, most rated Class I or II. Cooks Falls and Neva Falls are significantly more difficult rapids. Whitemouth Falls at the mouth of the river is not navigable.

The Whitemouth River has the non-parasitic, native species northern brook lamprey. The Whitemouth River watershed is one of the only places these lampreys are found in Manitoba. Almost the entire Canadian population of the nationally endangered carmine shiner is found within this river.

== See also ==
- List of Manitoba rivers
