= Hadashville, Manitoba =

Coordinates: 49°40′36″N 95°54′27″W

Hadashville is a small, unincorporated community in the Rural Municipality of Reynolds, in eastern Manitoba, Canada.

Hadashville is located in the Whitemouth River watershed north of the Sandilands Provincial Forest, about 100 kilometres (62 mi) east of Winnipeg on Highway 11, and 3.2 kilometres (2 mi) miles north of the Trans-Canada Highway. It has sandy soil, many farms, and is surrounded by the boreal forest. This Whitemouth River area is very close to the western edge of the Canadian Shield, and just north of the United States border.

The first settlements in the Hadashville area are believed to have been established about 1904. At that time, settlers received supplies from the nearest railway station near Whitemouth. The hamlet of Hadashville is named after Charles Hadash, who moved his family to the area after learning that a railway for the Greater Winnipeg Water District's (GWWD) Shoal Lake Aqueduct was planned. Hadash established the first post office in Hadashville along with a small store, pool room, and dance hall.
