= Libau, Manitoba =

Coordinates: 50°16′08″N 96°43′09″W

Libau is a community in the Canadian province of Manitoba. It is situated on the eastern edge of the Red River Estuary, just north of Selkirk. It is located in the Rural Municipality of St. Clements.

== History ==
Settled by Latvian, Icelandic and German settlers in the late 1800s who immigrated to Manitoba from various parts of Imperial Russia. They named the town after their port of departure, the ice-free harbour of Liepāja (Libau), on the Baltic Sea in West Latvia.

== Attractions ==
The marshes between Ironwood Point and Libau are known as the Netley-Libau Marsh and is known for its tremendous concentrations of southward migrating birds, with numbers of geese and ducks exceeding 100,000 during fall migration.
