= Victoria Beach, Manitoba =

Rural municipality in Manitoba, Canada

Victoria Beach
- Rural Municipality
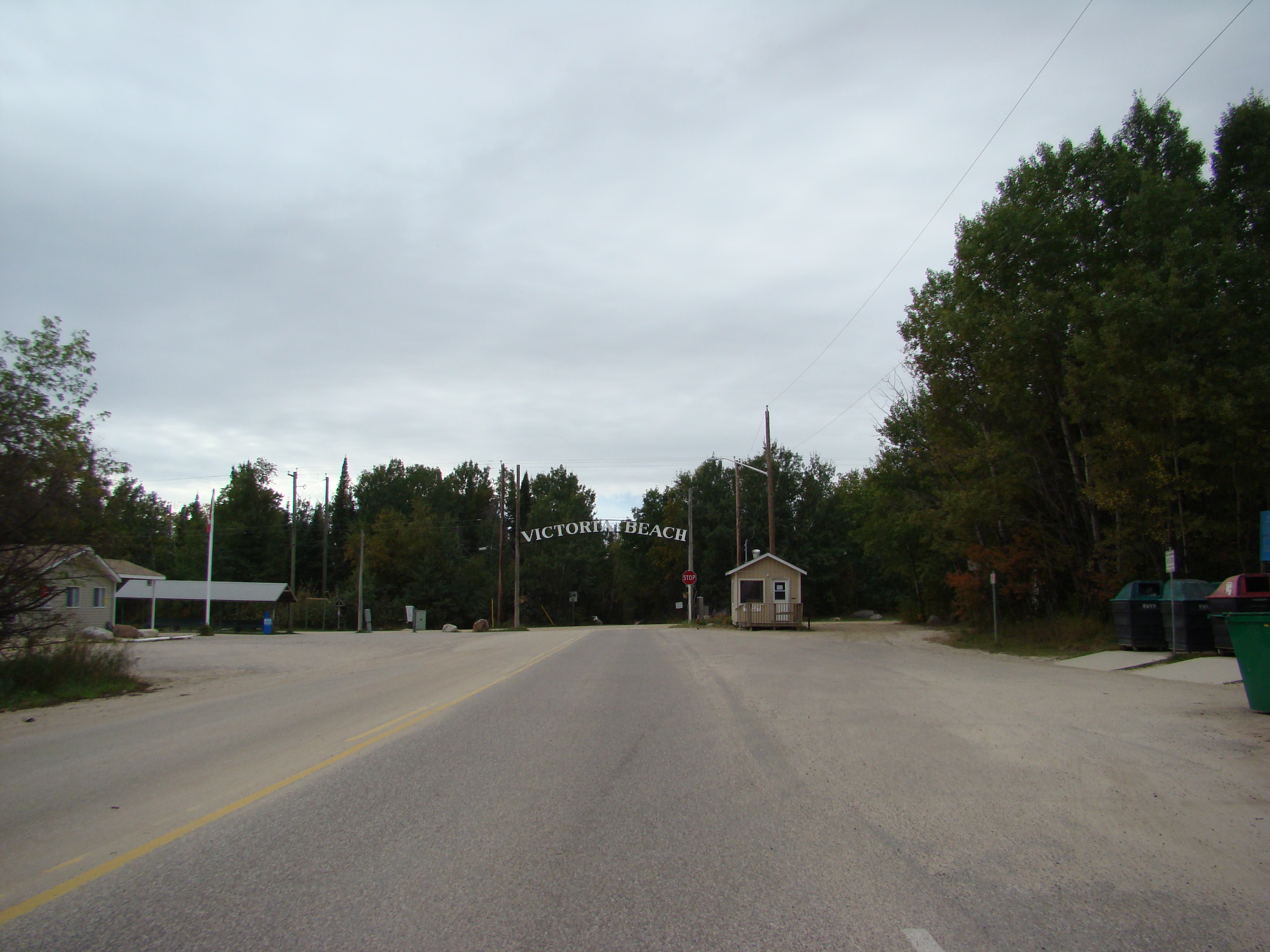
- Welcome sign to Victoria Beach

- Location of the Rural Municipality of Victoria Beach in Manitoba

- Location within Manitoba
- Coordinates: 50°43′50″N 96°32′20″W
- Country: Canada
- Province: Manitoba
- Region: Eastman
- Incorporated: August 16, 1919

Government
  - Mayor: Penny McMorris

Area
  - Total: 20.71 km^{2} (8.00 sq mi)

Population (2021)
  - Total: 689
  - Density: 33.3/km^{2} (86.2/sq mi)
- Website: victoriabeach.ca

Victoria Beach is a rural municipality (RM) in the Eastman Region of Manitoba, Canada, located on the southeastern shores of Lake Winnipeg, approximately 100 kilometres (62 mi) north of Winnipeg.

It lies on a small peninsula that extends into Lake Winnipeg, and is almost completely surrounded by the lake, but does share a small southern land border with the Rural Municipality of Alexander. With a land area of 20.279 km^{2} (7.830 sq mi), it is the smallest rural municipality in Manitoba in terms of area. It is slightly less than half the size of the next-smallest Rural Municipality of East St. Paul.

Victoria Beach is a so-called "resort municipality," as some of the finest beaches in Manitoba are located within the boundaries of the municipality. Elk Island Provincial Park lies on an island in the north end of the municipality.

As of the 2021 Canadian census, Victoria Beach had a permanent population of 689 residents, but during the summer season the population swells to over 5,000 people. Unlike other resort areas, (such as Grand Beach) the municipality has no campgrounds, picnic areas, or tourist attractions.

== History ==
The first Europeans, the Voyageurs, to travel Lake Winnipeg knew what is now the peninsula of Victoria Beach as L'Île-à-la-Biche. What is now the remains of the old railway dam were portaged as a shortcut from the Winnipeg River Estuary to Lake Winnipeg.

In April 1910, the Victoria Beach Investment Company was founded by C.W.N. Kennedy, having a president and 4 directors. The aim of the Company was to "lay out, improve, sell and dispose of its lands to be used primarily as a summer resort." Any person desirous of running a business had to get the approval of the VB Company.

In 1913, the assets of the Victoria Beach Investment Company were sold to the Victoria Beach Company, who upheld the original goals and continued to acquire land in the area. By 1915, the company had gained control of the land that now comprises the municipality. In the following years, the company sold numerous lots, and many campers had begun to construct cottages.

=== Incorporation ===
On 6 August 1919, after negotiations with the province, the Municipality of Victoria Beach was incorporated.

Because Victoria Beach was basically an island with only a narrow spit joining it to the mainland, there was no road access. However, in 1916, the railway was to arrive at Victoria Beach making it easier to bring in supplies to build cottages. After the war it was a constant desire of cottagers to have a road built to join Albert Beach to the rest of Victoria Beach and 1952 saw the completion of this road. By 1962, most people were arriving by car to their cabins and the railway was no longer required.

In 1921 the Victoria Beach Community Club was organized and in 1925 the Clubhouse was built which exists to this day. The Clubhouse was home to weekend dances and social events.

A golf course was built in 1923 and a tennis court in 1924. Both amenities exist to this day, with the tennis court now being close to the General Store. Einfelds Bakery operated since the 1930s, but was replaced by the Village Green Bakery in 2022.

On 15 June 1926, the Victoria Beach News began publishing. Today, it is run under the name of the Victoria Beach Herald, publishing only in the summer months.

Because the area was mainly a summer resort, those who lived here full-time had to be hardy outdoors people who relied on industries such as commercial fishing, trucking and the lumber industry in the off season. There were many mink ranches in Victoria Beach and Victoria Beach mink became unique and popular; however, with the advent of man-made materials which were lighter and the wearing of animal skins becoming distasteful, the last mink ranch pelted out in March 2003, marking the end of an era.

1935 saw both the Royal Canadian Legion and the Alex Anderson Memorial Community Club established in the community.

The Community Club is now a skating rink, curling club and social hall. Other amenities of the area include a marina, swimming docks for swimming lessons, a sailing club, Moonlight Inn Restaurant, a library, children's playground and beaches. Baseball was very popular and Victoria Beach teams were hugely successful in tournaments throughout the summer.

During the 1930s and 1940s, antisemitism was common in Victoria Beach. Members of the Anglo establishment often refused to sell or rent to Jews. An editorial in the Victoria Beach Herald euphemistically referring to Jews as "those unwanted people", and warned that Victoria Beach could "degenerate to a Coney Island" if Jews were allowed to rent and buy properties.

1954 saw Manitoba Hydro service provided to the permanent residents and in 1956 hydro was extended for use by the cottage community.

== Demographics ==
In the 2021 Census of Population conducted by Statistics Canada, Victoria Beach had a population of 689 living in 358 of its 1,854 total private dwellings, a change of 73.1% from its 2016 population of 398. With a land area of 20.71 km^{2} (8.00 sq mi), it had a population density of 33.3/km^{2} (86.2/sq mi) in 2021.

== Infrastructure ==
The roads of Victoria Beach are mostly a restricted area for vehicles and its gravel laneways are dominated by pedestrians and cyclists during the summer months. From the week before Canada Day until Labour Day, most motor vehicles are banned and must be parked within the Victoria Beach Parking Lot (VBPL) which is a private enterprise located at the main entrance to the community. Exceptions for motor vehicle access are afforded to delivery vehicles, contractors performing work, VBPL taxi service vehicles or other vehicles with compelling reasons for entry. These exceptions require drivers to adhere to strict speed limits while yielding to pedestrians and cyclists.

=== Pier ===
The first pier at Victoria Beach was constructed in 1912 by the Government of Canada as a place for commercial fishers to dock as well as a place for transport ships to drop off visitors. The first pier was gradually worn down by waves and ice as it was not built on a strong foundation. In 1949 a new pier was rebuilt with massive rocks to anchor the foundation and was finished at a cost of $70,000 in that year. The pier still stands today but the Government of Canada planned to remove the pier in 2003. Local commercial fishers organized a non-profit Victoria Beach Harbour Authority and the structure still stands today as of the early 2020s.

== Recreation ==
Victoria Beach and the restricted area provides cottagers and residents with a wealth of recreation in the community including the yacht club, marina with dock, baseball field, tennis courts and golf course.

=== Yacht club ===
Located on the east side of Lake Winnipeg near the town of Victoria Beach, the Yacht Club offers both recreation and race sailing. The yacht club in the community hosts the most active catamaran sailing fleet on Lake Winnipeg, as well as other dinghies and a small number of keelboats.

== See also ==
- List of francophone communities in Manitoba
- Royal eponyms in Canada
