= Seven Sisters Falls, Manitoba =

Community in Manitoba, Canada

Seven Sisters Falls
- Location of Whitemouth in Manitoba
- Coordinates: 50°06′19″N 96°00′54″W
- Country: Canada
- Province: Manitoba
- Region: Eastman
- Rural Municipality: Whitemouth
- Established: 1929

Government
  - MP (Provencher): Ted Falk (CPC)
  - MLA (Lac du Bonnet): Wayne Ewasko
- Elevation: 268 m (879 ft)

Population
  - Total: 180
- estimated
- Time zone: UTC-6 (CST)
  - Summer (DST): UTC-5 (CDT)
- Postal code: R0E 2G0
- Website: rmwhitemouth.com

Seven Sisters Falls is a community in the Rural Municipality of Whitemouth, Manitoba.

It is the location of Manitoba Hydro's Seven Sisters Generating Station and the Whitemouth Falls Provincial Park. Seven Sisters Falls was named by fur traders for a series of seven rapids that were located along the Winnipeg River which are now the site of the hydroelectric dam.
