= Powerview-Pine Falls =

- Town
- Town of Powerview-Pine Falls
- Location within Manitoba
- Coordinates: 50.336°N 96.115°W
- Country: Canada
- Province: Manitoba
- Region: Eastman

Population (2021)
  - Total: 1,239
- Time zone: UTC-6 (Central (CST))
  - Summer (DST): UTC-5 (Central (CDT))
- Area code: 204
- Website: Official website

Powerview-Pine Falls is a town in the Canadian province of Manitoba, with a population of 1,314 at the 2011 census, up 1.54% from 1,294 at the 2006 census and down 7.57% from 1,400 during the 2001 census.

The town is an amalgamation of the previous town of Powerview with the previously unincorporated area of Pine Falls, to its west. The town borders the Rural Municipality of Alexander and the Sagkeeng First Nation Indian reserve. Manitoba Highway 11 and Manitoba Provincial Road 304 are the major roads connecting Powerview with other nearby communities.

== History ==
The community was created as a paper mill town in the mid 1920s as Manitoba Pulp and Paper Company. The company was sold to Abitibi Paper Company and became Pine Falls Paper Group in 1995 after employee buyout; finally, it sold to Tembec in 1998.

In 2009, Tembec shut down the mill for good and the site was demolished by 2012, but the mill's footprint next to Slasher Bay is still visible. The mine was served by Canadian National Railway since 1924 and ended after the mill closed.

The current-day town of Powerview-Pine Falls came as result of an amalgamation of the previous town of Powerview (50°33′58″N 96°11′53″W) with the previously unincorporated area of Pine Falls (50°33′59″N 96°13′03″W), to its west.

== Demographics ==
In the 2021 Census of Population conducted by Statistics Canada, Powerview-Pine Falls had a population of 1,239 living in 511 of its 566 total private dwellings, a change of −5.9% from its 2016 population of 1,316. With a land area of 4.82 km^{2} (1.86 sq mi), it had a population density of 257.1/km^{2} (665.8/sq mi) in 2021.

As a designated place in the 2021 Census of Population, Pine Falls had a population of 616 living in 245 of its 274 total private dwellings, a change of −2.5% from its 2016 population of 632. With a land area of 2.41 km^{2} (0.93 sq mi), it had a population density of 255.6/km^{2} (662.0/sq mi) in 2021.

Also as a designated place in 2021, Powerview had a population of 623 living in 266 of its 292 total private dwellings, a change of −8.9% from its 2016 population of 684. With a land area of 2.41 km^{2} (0.93 sq mi), it had a population density of 258.5/km^{2} (669.5/sq mi) in 2021.

== Employment ==
With the closure of the paper mill, the Pine Falls Hospital (Pine Falls Health Complex) of the Interlake-Eastern Regional Health Authority is the community's largest employer.

== Climate ==
Pine Falls has a hemiboreal humid continental climate (Köppen Dfb), with short, warm summers and severely cold, snowy winters.

Climate data for Pine Falls
| Month | Jan | Feb | Mar | Apr | May | Jun | Jul | Aug | Sep | Oct | Nov | Dec | Year |
|---|---|---|---|---|---|---|---|---|---|---|---|---|---|
| Record high °C (°F) | 7.5 (45.5) | 8 (46) | 19.4 (66.9) | 35 (95) | 35 (95) | 37 (99) | 36.1 (97.0) | 36.5 (97.7) | 37 (99) | 28.3 (82.9) | 22.8 (73.0) | 6.7 (44.1) | 37 (99) |
| Mean daily maximum °C (°F) | −13.7 (7.3) | −9.7 (14.5) | −1.4 (29.5) | 9.6 (49.3) | 18.5 (65.3) | 22.2 (72.0) | 25.3 (77.5) | 23.5 (74.3) | 16.7 (62.1) | 9.4 (48.9) | −1.5 (29.3) | −11.1 (12.0) | 7.3 (45.1) |
| Daily mean °C (°F) | −18.6 (−1.5) | −14.9 (5.2) | −6.8 (19.8) | 3.8 (38.8) | 12.2 (54.0) | 16.3 (61.3) | 19.4 (66.9) | 17.6 (63.7) | 11.5 (52.7) | 5.1 (41.2) | −5 (23) | −15.6 (3.9) | 2.1 (35.8) |
| Mean daily minimum °C (°F) | −23.5 (−10.3) | −20 (−4) | −12.2 (10.0) | −2 (28) | 5.7 (42.3) | 10.3 (50.5) | 13.5 (56.3) | 11.7 (53.1) | 6.3 (43.3) | 0.7 (33.3) | −8.4 (16.9) | −19.9 (−3.8) | −3.2 (26.2) |
| Record low °C (°F) | −43.3 (−45.9) | −46.7 (−52.1) | −42.2 (−44.0) | −28.3 (−18.9) | −12.8 (9.0) | −3.9 (25.0) | 1.7 (35.1) | −1.5 (29.3) | −5.6 (21.9) | −17 (1) | −35 (−31) | −30 (−22) | −46.7 (−52.1) |
| Average precipitation mm (inches) | 20.1 (0.79) | 14.6 (0.57) | 18.8 (0.74) | 22.4 (0.88) | 52.4 (2.06) | 93.3 (3.67) | 77.4 (3.05) | 74.3 (2.93) | 72.1 (2.84) | 46.8 (1.84) | 25.8 (1.02) | 20.4 (0.80) | 538.5 (21.20) |
| Average rainfall mm (inches) | 0.0 (0.0) | 0.1 (0.00) | 3.4 (0.13) | 19.4 (0.76) | 52.0 (2.05) | 93.3 (3.67) | 77.5 (3.05) | 74.3 (2.93) | 71.8 (2.83) | 41.4 (1.63) | 4.0 (0.16) | 1.3 (0.05) | 438.6 (17.27) |
| Average snowfall cm (inches) | 20.1 (7.9) | 14.5 (5.7) | 15.4 (6.1) | 3.1 (1.2) | 0.4 (0.2) | 0.0 (0.0) | 0.0 (0.0) | 0.0 (0.0) | 0.2 (0.1) | 5.3 (2.1) | 21.9 (8.6) | 19.1 (7.5) | 99.9 (39.3) |
Source: Environment Canada

== See also ==
- List of francophone communities in Manitoba
