= Rural Municipality of Reynolds =

Rural municipality in Manitoba, Canada

Reynolds
- Rural municipality
- Rural Municipality of Reynolds
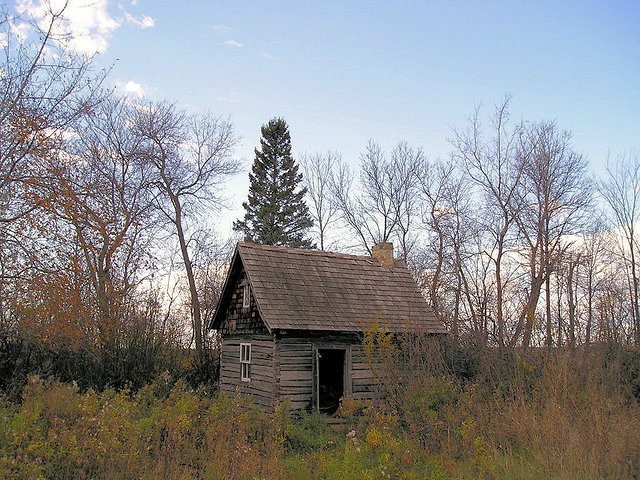
- Log Cabin near Medika

- Location of the Rural Municipality of Reynolds in Manitoba
- Coordinates: 49.624°N 95.878°W
- Country: Canada
- Province: Manitoba
- Census Division: No. 1

Government
  - Reeve: Russ Gawluk

Area
  - Land: 3,559.65 km^{2} (1,374.39 sq mi)

Population (2021)
  - Total: 1,344
  - Density: 0.4/km^{2} (1.0/sq mi)
- Time zone: UTC-5
  - Summer (DST): EST
- Area code(s): 204
- Website: rmofreynolds.com

The Rural Municipality of Reynolds is a rural municipality (RM) in southeastern Manitoba, Canada.

It is the largest rural municipality by area in Manitoba, at 3,559.65 km^{2} (1,374.39 sq mi). Most of Manitoba's Sandilands and Agassiz Provincial Forests are located here, as are parts of Whiteshell Provincial Forest and Whiteshell Provincial Park.

== Communities ==
- Culver
- East Braintree
- Hadashville
- Hazel
- Hocter
- Indigo
- Larkhall
- McMunn
- Medika
- Molson
- Prawda
- Rennie
- Ste. Rita
- Spruce Siding

== Demographics ==
In the 2021 Census of Population conducted by Statistics Canada, Reynolds had a population of 1,344 living in 582 of its 910 total private dwellings, a change of 0.4% from its 2016 population of 1,338. With a land area of 3,559.65 km^{2} (1,374.39 sq mi), it had a population density of 0.4/km^{2} (1.0/sq mi) in 2021.

Historical census populations – Rural Municipality of Reynolds

| Year | Pop. | ±% |
|---|---|---|
| 1976 | 1,175 | — |
| 1981 | 1,125 | −4.3% |
| 1986 | 1,175 | +4.4% |
| 1991 | 1,297 | +10.4% |
| 1996 | 1,314 | +1.3% |

| Year | Pop. | ±% |
|---|---|---|
| 2001 | 1,298 | −1.2% |
| 2006 | 1,410 | +8.6% |
| 2011 | 1,285 | −8.9% |
| 2016 | 1,338 | +4.1% |
| 2021 | 1,344 | +0.4% |

Source: Statistics Canada

== See also ==
- List of francophone communities in Manitoba
