= Rural Municipality of Lac du Bonnet =

Rural municipality in Manitoba, Canada

Lac Du Bonnet
- Rural municipality
- Rural Municipality of Lac Du Bonnet
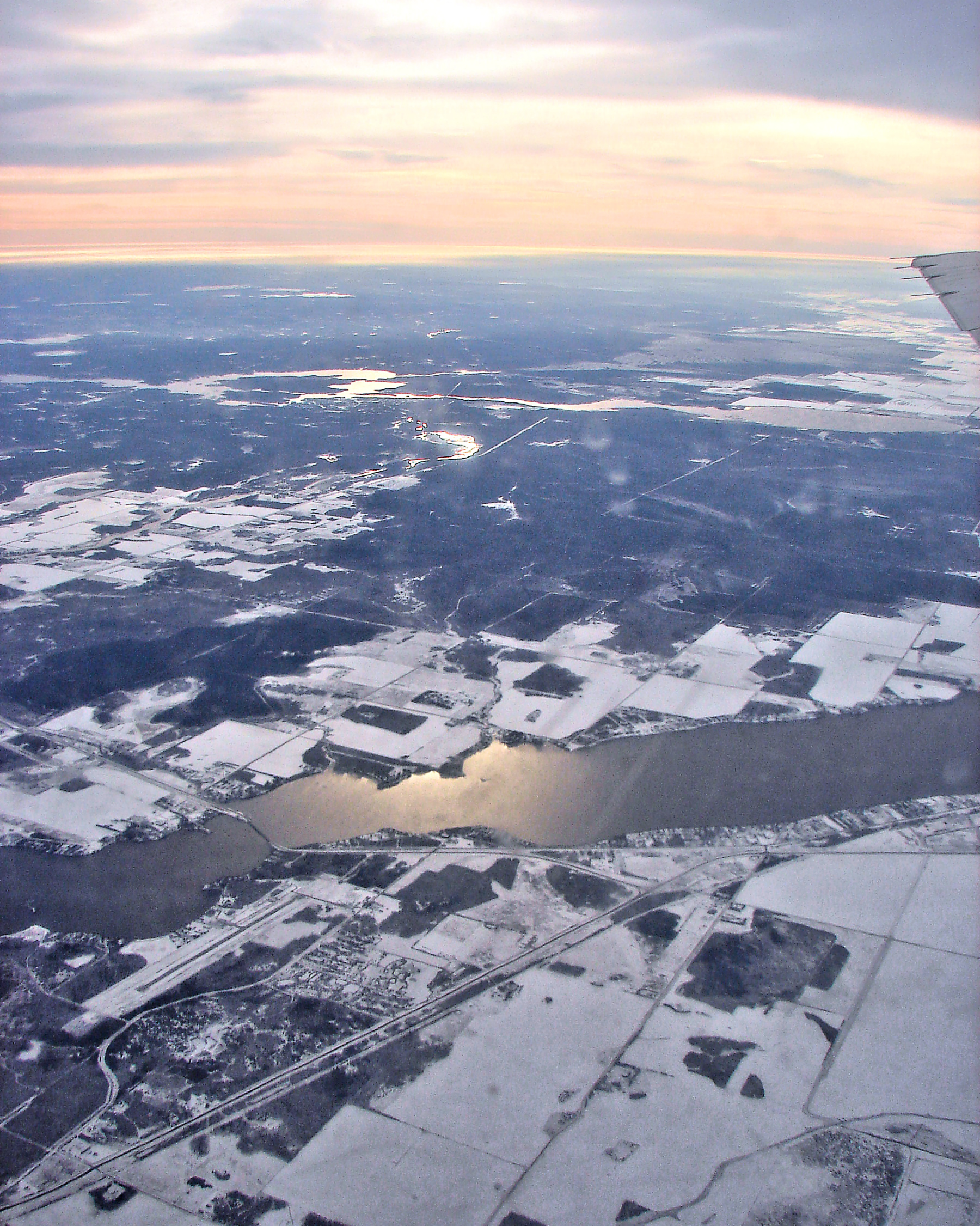
- Aerial view of RM Lac du Bonnet

- Location of the Rural Municipality of Lac du Bonnet in Manitoba
- Coordinates: 50.23833°N 96.07556°W
- Country: Canada
- Province: Manitoba
- Region: Eastman
- Census division: 1
- Incorporated: 1917

Government
  - Reeve: Loren Schinkel

Area
  - Land: 1,097.61 km^{2} (423.79 sq mi)

Population (2021)
  - Total: 3,563
  - Density: 2.8/km^{2} (7.3/sq mi)
- Website: rmoflacdubonnet.com

Lac du Bonnet is a rural municipality in the province of Manitoba in Western Canada, situated between the Nopiming Provincial Park to the northeast and Whiteshell Provincial Park to the southeast.

The separately-administered town of Lac du Bonnet lies within the borders of the municipality. It also mostly encircles the Pinawa local government district in the municipality's southeast part. A large portion of the municipality includes waters of the Winnipeg River and its tributaries.

The RM contains the southern part of Manitoba's Brightstone Sand Hills Provincial Forest and the northern part of Agassiz Provincial Forest, although most of these forests lie in other RMs.

== Communities ==
- Allegra
- Lee River
- Lowland
- McArthur Falls
- Milner Ridge
- Seddons Corner (part)
- Spring Well

== Demographics ==
In the 2021 Census of Population conducted by Statistics Canada, Lac du Bonnet had a population of 3,563 living in 1,459 of its 2,757 total private dwellings, a change of 14.2% from its 2016 population of 3,121. With a land area of 1,097.61 km^{2} (423.79 sq mi), it had a population density of 3.2/km^{2} (8.4/sq mi) in 2021.

== See also ==
- List of francophone communities in Manitoba
