= Rural Municipality of Whitemouth =

Rural municipality in Manitoba, Canada

Whitemouth
- Rural municipality
- Rural Municipality of Whitemouth
- Location of the Rural Municipality of Whitemouth in Manitoba
- Coordinates: 49°58′01″N 95°57′30″W
- Country: Canada
- Province: Manitoba
- Census Division: No. 1
- First incorporated: March 1, 1905
- Incorporated (amalgamated): January 1, 2015

Government
  - Reeve: Walter Amerongen

Area
  - Land: 697.35 km^{2} (269.25 sq mi)

Population (2021)
  - Total: 1,630
  - Density: 2.3/km^{2} (6.0/sq mi)
- Time zone: UTC-5 (EST)
- Area code(s): 204
- Website: rmwhitemouth.com

The Rural Municipality of Whitemouth is a rural municipality (RM) located in southeastern Manitoba.

The community of Whitemouth is located in the municipality, which also contains the Whitemouth Bog Ecological Reserve, and small parts of Manitoba's Agassiz Provincial Forest (in its southwest quadrant) and Whiteshell Provincial Forest (in its northeast corner).

== Communities ==
- Darwin
- Elma
- River Hills
- Seven Sisters Falls
- Whitemouth

== Demographics ==
In the 2021 Census of Population conducted by Statistics Canada, Whitemouth had a population of 1,630 living in 631 of its 780 total private dwellings, a change of 4.7% from its 2016 population of 1,557. With a land area of 697.35 km^{2} (269.25 sq mi), it had a population density of 2.3/km^{2} (6.1/sq mi) in 2021.

Historical census populations – Rural Municipality of Whitemouth

Year	Pop.	±%
1976	1,903	—
1981	1,836	−3.5%
1986	1,820	−0.9%
1991	1,714	−5.8%
1996	1,639	−4.4%

Year	Pop.	±%
2001	1,617	−1.3%
2006	1,480	−8.5%
2011	1,548	+4.6%
2016	1,557	+0.6%
2021	1,630	+4.7%

Source: Statistics Canada
