= Whitemouth, Manitoba =

Whitemouth
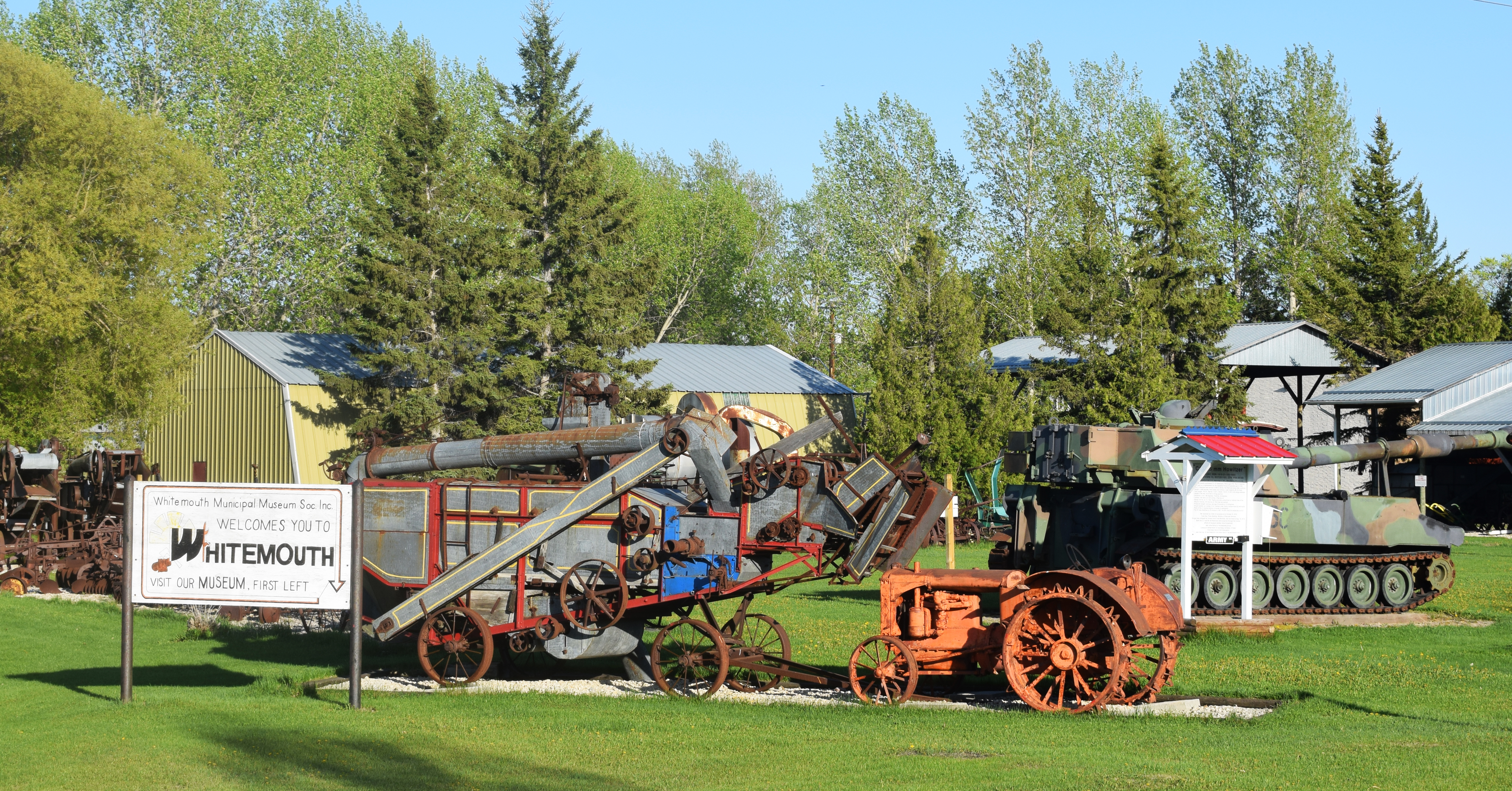

- Location of Whitemouth in Manitoba
- Coordinates: 49°57′15″N 95°58′31″W
- Country: Canada
- Province: Manitoba
- Region: Eastman
- Rural Municipality: Whitemouth

Government
  - MP (Provencher): Ted Falk (CPC)
  - MLA (Lac du Bonnet): Wayne Ewasko

Area
  - Land: 3.26 km^{2} (1.26 sq mi)
- Elevation: 276 m (906 ft)

Population (2016)
  - Total: 303
  - Density: 92.9/km^{2} (241/sq mi)
- Time zone: UTC-6 (CST)
  - Summer (DST): UTC-5 (CDT)
- Postal code: R0E 2G0
- Area codes: 204, 431
- Website: rmwhitemouth.com

Whitemouth is a community in the Rural Municipality of Whitemouth, located in southeastern Manitoba, Canada. The community is named after the Whitemouth River. It was established in 1905 along the main Canadian Pacific Railway line.

== Demographics ==
In the 2021 Census of Population conducted by Statistics Canada, Whitemouth had a population of 387 living in 166 of its 189 total private dwellings, a change of 27.7% from its 2016 population of 303. With a land area of 3.06 km^{2} (1.18 sq mi), it had a population density of 126.5/km^{2} (327.6/sq mi) in 2021.
