= Lac du Bonnet, Manitoba =

Lac du Bonnet
- Town
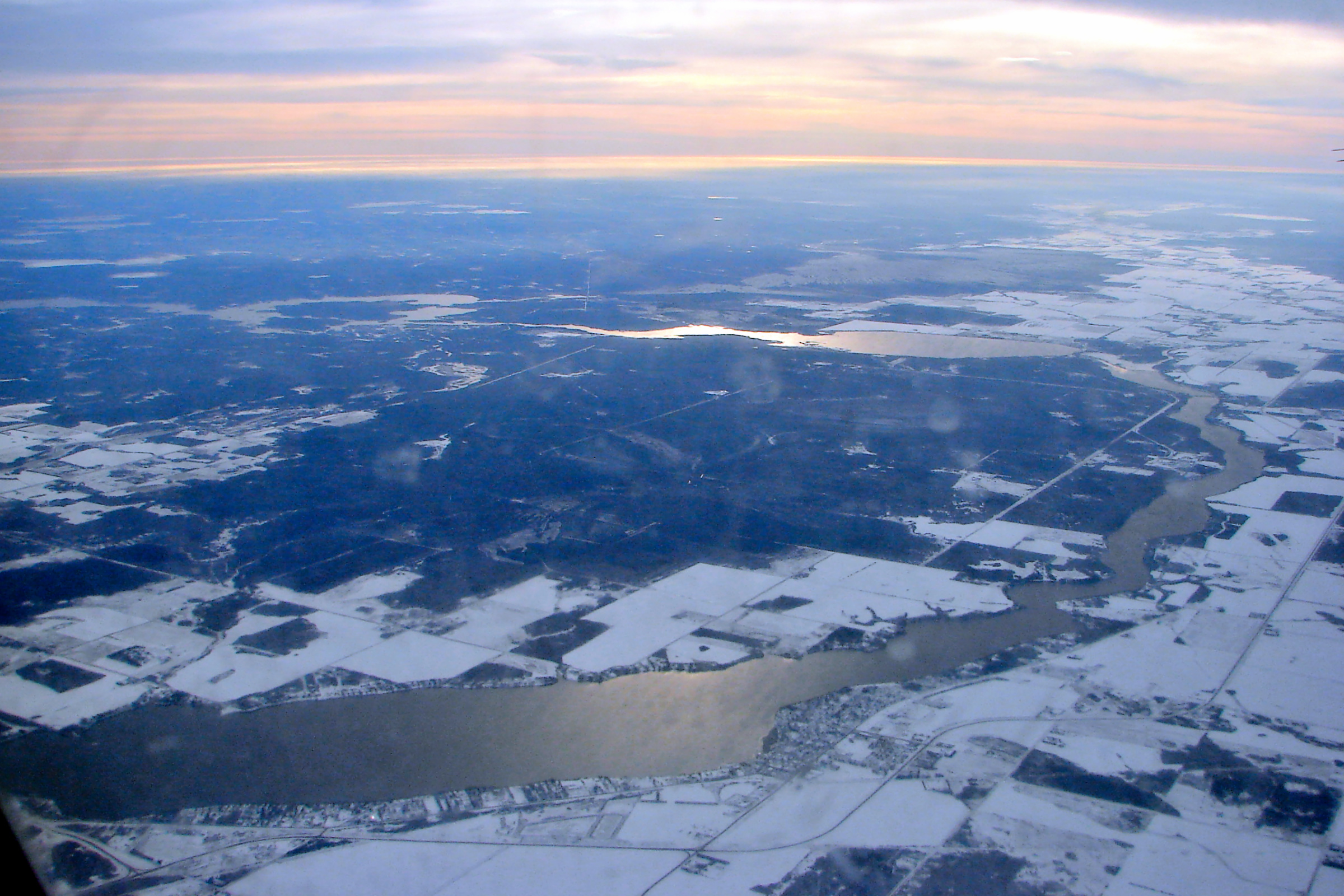
- Aerial view of Lac du Bonnet Town, surrounded by Lac du Bonnet RM

- Town boundaries

- Location within Manitoba
- Coordinates: 50°15′13″N 96°03′38″W
- Country: Canada
- Province: Manitoba
- Region: Eastman
- Incorporated: June 16, 1958

Government
  - Mayor: Ken Lodge
  - MLA Lac du Bonnet: Wayne Ewasko
  - MP Selkirk—Interlake—Eastman: James Bezan

Area (2021)
  - Total: 2.26 km^{2} (0.87 sq mi)
- Elevation: 260 m (854 ft)

Population (2021)
  - Total: 1,064
  - Density: 470.7/km^{2} (1,219/sq mi)
- Time zone: UTC-06:00 (Central (CST))
  - Summer (DST): UTC-05:00 (Central (CDT))
- Postal code: R0E 1A0
- Area code: 204
- Website: townoflacdubonnet.com

Lac du Bonnet is a town in Manitoba, Canada located 115 km (71 mi) northeast of Winnipeg on the west shore of the Winnipeg River. It is surrounded by the Rural Municipality of Lac du Bonnet. The word "Bonnet" is pronounced by locals as "bonny."

== History ==
The lake after which Lac du Bonnet takes its name was named by the French explorer and fur trader Pierre Gaultier La Verendrye, c. 1732. The shape of the lake, itself part of the Winnipeg River, is said to have reminded him of a bonnet. The name "Lac du Bonnet" appears on a map of the explorer Joseph Derouen as early as 1760.

Beginning in 1926, Lac du Bonnet was home to the #1 Wing of the Royal Canadian Air Force. As a backup communication system to wireless telephone transmitters, aircraft carried pigeons aboard, and as such a pigeon rookery was established on the air force base. RCAF operations in Lac du Bonnet continued until 1937.

During the 2025 Canadian wildfires, a portion of the municipality of Lac du Bonnet was forced to evacuate.

== Demographics ==
In the 2021 Census of Population conducted by Statistics Canada, Lac du Bonnet had a population of 1,064 living in 496 of its 549 total private dwellings, a change of −2.3% from its 2016 population of 1,089. With a land area of 2.26 km^{2} (0.87 sq mi), it had a population density of 470.8/km^{2} (1,219.4/sq mi) in 2021.

== Attractions and events ==
On the first of July is a yearly Canada Day parade, with fireworks, carnival rides, car show, and bingo. There are also usually many other community-hosted events.

In November, Christmas-themed lighting is set up on the streets, kids can visit Santa, and a Christmas tree is erected.

There are designated snowmobile trails into Lac du Bonnet and specific areas for snowmobile operators to park, along with five warming shelters. All of the trail maintenance is done by volunteer organizations.

During the weekend in early March, the river is dotted with 1,000 holes for the local ice fishing derby.

The annual Fire & Water Music Festival takes place on August-long weekend. Artists from across the country come to perform their music.

== First airmail flight ==
Lac du Bonnet was the location of the first airmail flight in Manitoba, on 4 October 1927. This event is commemorated with a plaque and marker on the E side of Park Avenue by 3rd Street, next to the parking lot. According to the plaque, the flight was some 39 kg (85 lb) of mail, taken from here to Bissett and Wadhope.

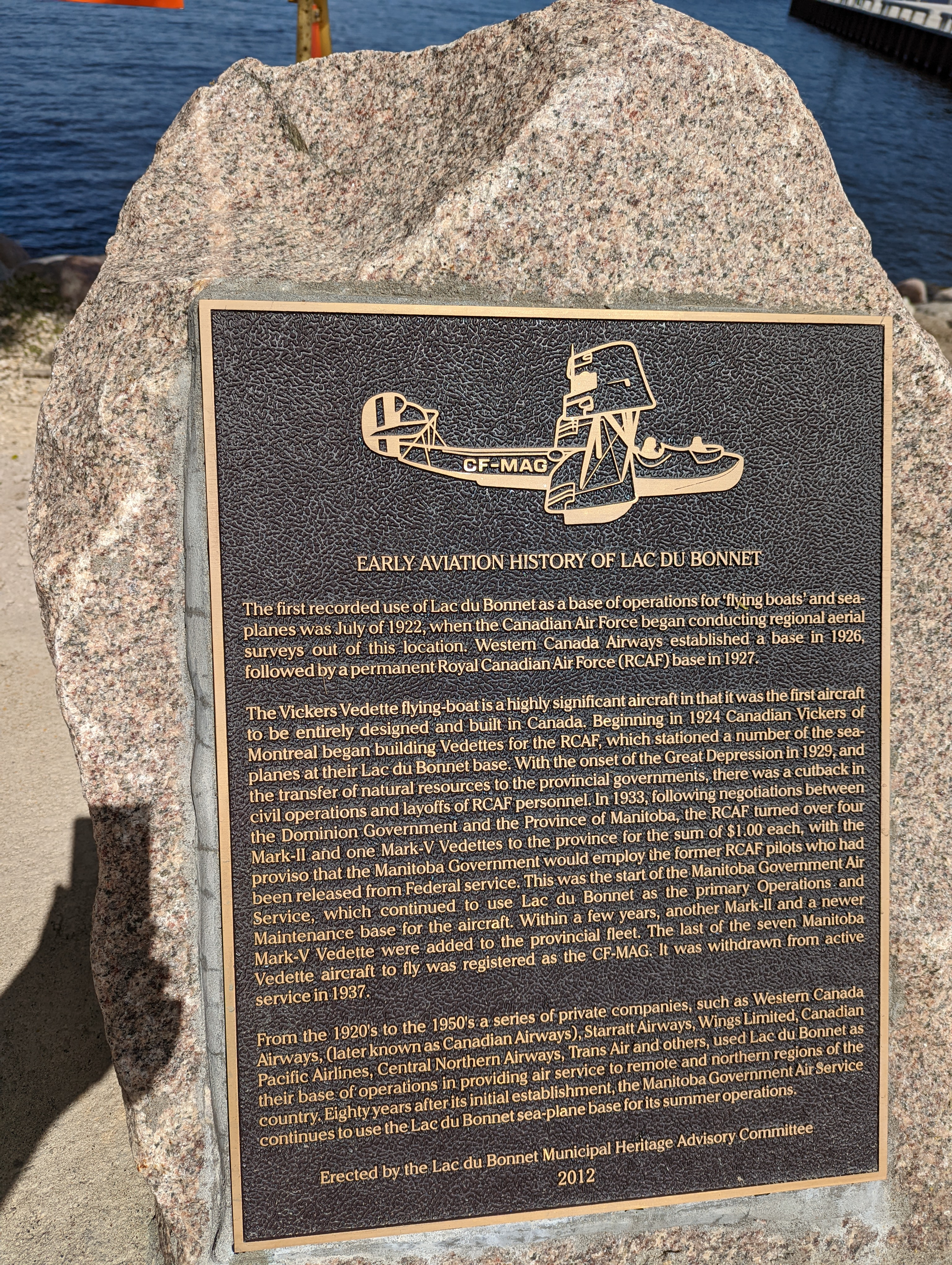
A historical plaque and a sculpture of a Vickers Vedette "flying boat" aircraft are installed at the waterfront in the centre of town.

== Media ==
=== Newspapers ===
- Lac du Bonnet Leader, which published its final issue on June 27, 2013
- Winnipeg River Echo
- Winnipeg River Clipper Weekly

=== Radio and television ===
CBWT-2 first went on the air on May 27, 1968. In early 1969, the province-wide microwave system replaced the kine recordings; citizens of Lac Du Bonnet have had live television since this conversion.

- CBWT-2 Channel 4 (CBC)
- CICA Channel 44 (TVO)
