= Manitoba Highway 12 =

Highway in Manitoba

Provincial Trunk Highway 12
- MOM's Way
- PTH 12 highlighted in red

Route information
- Maintained by Manitoba Infrastructure
- Length: 256 km (159 mi)
- Existed: 1928–present

Major junctions
- South end: MN 313 at the U.S. border near Buffalo Point
- PTH 89 near Piney; PTH 52 in Steinbach; PTH 1 (TCH) near Ste Anne; PTH 15 in Anola; PTH 44 near Beausejour; PTH 59 near Beaconia
- North end: Grand Beach

Location
- Country: Canada
- Province: Manitoba
- Rural municipalities: Alexander; Brokenhead; Hanover; La Broquerie; Piney; Springfield; St. Clements; Ste. Anne; Stuarburn; Taché
- Major cities: Steinbach
- Towns: Beausejour

Highway system
- Provincial highways in Manitoba; Winnipeg City Routes
← PTH 11	→ PTH 13

Provincial Trunk Highway 12 (PTH 12) is a provincial primary highway located in the Canadian province of Manitoba. Lying entirely in the Eastman Region, it runs from the U.S. border (where it meets with Minnesota State Highway 313) to a dead end in Grand Beach. PTH 12 forms the Manitoba section of MOM's Way, a tourist route from Thunder Bay to Winnipeg. PTH 12 is primarily a two-lane highway except for two four-lane stretch between Steinbach and PTH 1 (22 kilometres) and a ten-kilometre concurrency with PTH 44.

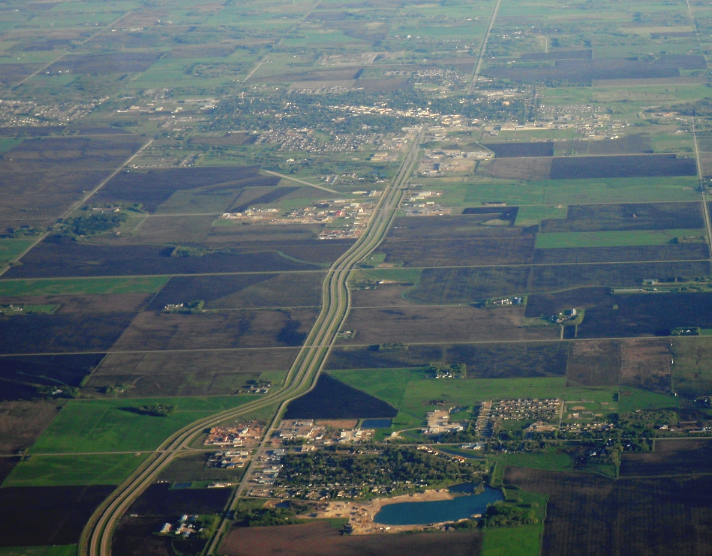
Highway 12 running south from Blumenort (lower) to Steinbach (upper) as a four-lane road and can be seen exiting Steinbach to the upper part of the photo as a two-lane highway

== Route Description ==
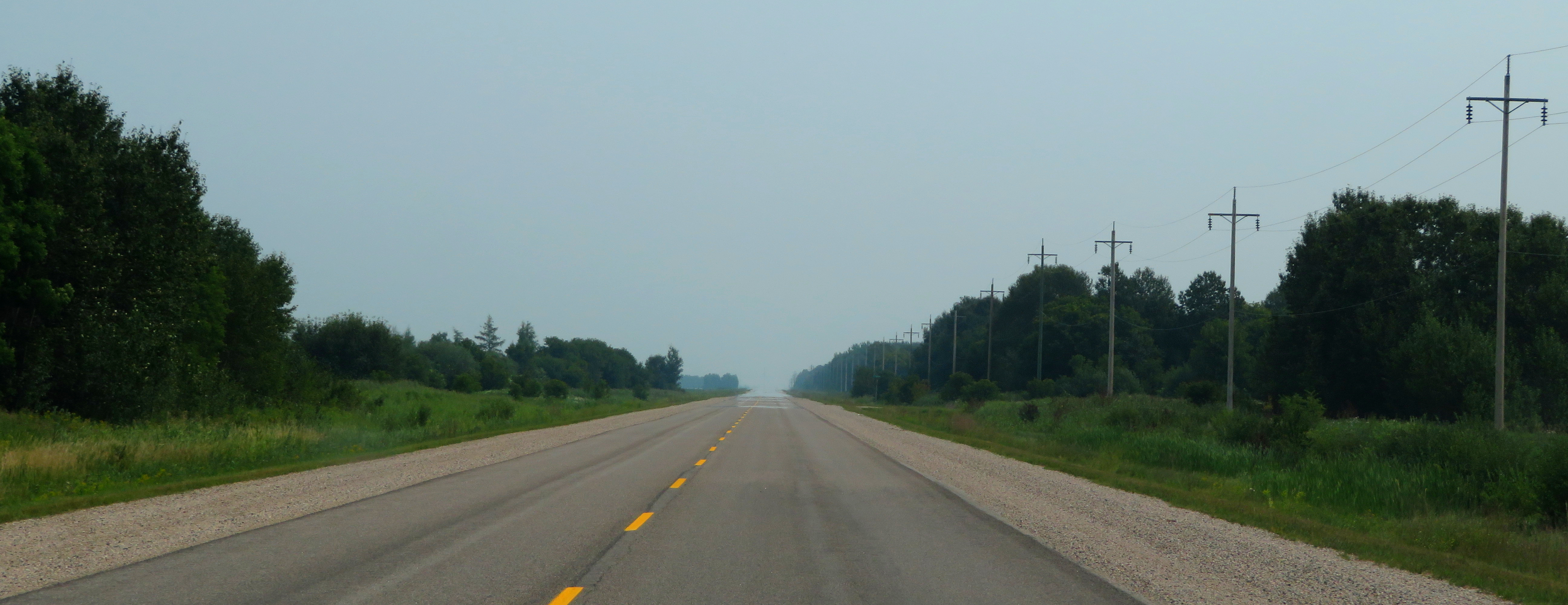
PTH 12 near the Minnesota border

PTH 12 begins in the southeast corner of the province in the Rural Municipality of Piney as a continuation of Minnesota State Highway 313 (MN 313) at the Warroad-Sprague Border Crossing. It immediately has an intersection with Buffalo Point Road, which leads to Buffalo Point, before curving to the west as a two-lane highway to pass through Middlebro. Between the U.S. border and Buffalo Point Road, the highway lies less than 5 kilometres (3.1 mi) from the shores of Lake of the Woods. The road heads nearly due west for the next several kilometers, traveling through wooded areas while having an intersection with PR 308 in Sprague (which provides access to the Northwest Angle), and PR 310 in South Junction (which provides access to Roseau, MN), before having intersections with access roads leading to Vassar. PTH 12 transitions into farmland as travels along the north side of Piney, where it junctions with PTH 89, PR 201, and PR 203 at a single intersection. The highway enters woodlands again to have an intersection with PR 210 near Menisino before curving northwest to cross into the Rural Municipality of Stuartburn.

PTH 12 has a junction with Road 53 east, which leads to Sundown, before passing through the community of Lonesand. The highway crosses into the Rural Municipality of La Broquerie at a junction with PR 404 and PR 203. It now travels through the community of Zhoda, junctioning with PR 302 and re-entering farmland, and has an intersection with PR 403 before entering the Rural Municipality of Hanover.

PTH 12 curves due northward to have an intersection with PR 205 near Sarto, as well an intersection with PR 303 near Friedensfeld, before entering the city of Steinbach as it passes by the Steinbach (South) Airport. The road widens to a four lane divided highway as it passes through neighborhoods and the western end of downtown as Brandt Street, where it has a junction with PTH 52 (Main Street) in the middle of an S-curve. PTH 12 continues north through a business district, passing by Steinbach Airport, before leaving Steinbach and returning to the Rural Municipality of Hanover. The highway has a short concurrency (overlap) with PR 311 in Blumenort, which it bypasses along its eastern side, before crossing into the Rural Municipality of Ste. Anne.

PTH 12 has a junction with PR 210 before bypassing the town of Ste. Anne along its western side, where it has an interchange with PR 207 (part of the Old Dawson Trail). It now has a rather large Cloverleaf interchange with PTH 1 (Trans-Canada Highway) before narrowing to two lanes as it enters the Rural Municipality of Tache. The continues due north through rural farmland, having an intersection with PR 501 near Rosewood, before crossing into the Rural Municipality of Springfield.

Between the Minnesota border and the Trans-Canada Highway, PTH 12 forms the Manitoba portion of MOM's Way.

PTH 12 travels through the center of the town of Anola, where it has an intersection with PTH 15, before traveling along the border with the Rural Municipality of Brokenhead for the next several kilometers, junctioning with PR 213 and PR 215 as it travels through the community of Hazelglen. It fully enters the Rural Municipality of Brokenhead as it becomes concurrent with PTH 44 near Garson and Tyndall. The two head due east as a four lane divided highway for a couple kilometers to bypass the town of Beausejour on the north side, where PTH 12 splits of and heads north as a two lane highway. PTH 12 has an intersection with PR 435 before traveling through Ladywood and Dencross, where it junctions with PR 317.

PTH 12 crosses into the Rural Municipality of St. Clements shortly before crossing the Brokenhead River, traveling through Thalberg before becoming concurrent with PTH 59 in Gull Lake (after passing by the Lake of the same name). They head north along the border with the Rural Municipality of Alexander, having intersections with PR 304 and PR 500 in Beaconia, before returning to the Rural Municipality of St. Clements as PTH 12 splits off and heads east. PTH 12 has another intersection with PR 500 before traveling through the town of Grand Marais, where it comes to a dead end in Grand Beach Provincial Park, along the eastern shore of Lake Winnipeg.

== History ==
PTH 12 was originally designated in 1928 and followed the Old Dawson Trail from St. Boniface to Ste. Anne. In the 1950s, it was extended south to Sarto, then southeast to Zhoda, Piney, South Junction, and eventually Sprague. The original portion of PTH 12 was decommissioned (most of it is now part of Provincial Road 207) and then extended north to Beausejour and Pine Falls, replacing PTH 22 north of Anola. A spur, Manitoba Highway 12V, was created from PTH 12 to Victoria Beach from the part of PTH 22 that was not replaced by PTH 12. Another spur, Manitoba Highway 12G, was created from PTH 12 to Grand Beach as a renumbering of PTH 22A. In 1960, PTH 12 was extended southeast to the Minnesota border. In 1966, the section of PTH 12 from PTH 12V to Pine Falls became part of PTH 11, and the section of PTH 12 from PTH 12G to PTH 12V, along with PTH 12V itself, became part of PTH 59. At the same time, PTH 12 was rerouted over PTH 12G.

== Major intersections ==
Division	Location	km	mi	Destinations	Notes
Piney		0	0.0	MN 313 south (MOM's Way) – Warroad	Continuation into Minnesota
Piney		0	0.0	Canada–United States border at Warroad–Sprague Border Crossing	
Piney	Sprague	21	13	PR 308 north – Northwest Angle	
Piney	South Junction	31	19	PR 310 south – South Junction, Roseau	
Piney		48	30	PTH 89 south / PR 203 north to PR 201 – Piney, Badger, Vita	
Piney		62	39	PR 210 north / Road 59 East – Marchand, Woodridge	
Stuartburn				Road 53 east – Sundown	Former PR 402 south
Stuartburn		84	52	PR 404 north to PR 203 – Sandilands, Woodridge	
La Broquerie	Zhoda	94	58	PR 302 – Vita	Former PR 208 south
La Broquerie		102	63	PR 403 west – Pansy, St. Malo	
Hanover		113	70	PR 205 west – Grunthal, Sarto, St. Pierre-Jolys	
Hanover		121	75	PR 303 east / Ridge Road west west – Friedensfeld	Former PR 303 west
City of Steinbach		127	79	McKenzie Avenue	South end of Brandt Street concurrency
City of Steinbach		128	80	PTH 52 (Main Street) – Mitchell, La Broquerie	
City of Steinbach		128	80	Loewen Boulevard	North end of Brandt Street concurrency
City of Steinbach		130	81	Park Road	
City of Steinbach		132	82	Clearsprings Road	
Hanover		133	83	PR 311 east – Giroux	South end of PR 311 concurrency
Hanover		137	85	PR 311 west – Blumenort, Niverville	North end of PR 311 concurrency
Ste. Anne		144	89	PR 210 – Ste. Anne, Landmark, La Broquerie	
Ste. Anne		145	90	PR 207 (Dawson Road) – Ste. Anne, Lorette, Richer	Interchange; former PTH 12
Ste. Anne		147	91	PTH 1 (TCH) – Winnipeg, Falcon Lake, Kenora	Interchange; PTH 1 exit 375; MOM's Way western (northern) terminus
Taché		152	94	PR 501 – Ross	
Springfield	Anola	166	103	PTH 15 (Dugald Road) – Winnipeg, Dugald, Elma	
Springfield		174	108	Hazelridge Road 65N	Former PR 213 west
Brokenhead / Springfield		176	109	PR 213 west – Hazelridge	
Brokenhead / Springfield		185	115	PR 215 east – Beausejour	
Brokenhead		187	116	PTH 44 west – Lockport, Tyndall–Garson	South end of PTH 44 concurrency
Brokenhead	Beausejour			Road 41 east / 1st Street	Former PTH 4B east
Brokenhead	Beausejour	197	122	PTH 44 east – West Hawk Lake	North end of PTH 44 concurrency
Brokenhead		205	127	PR 435	
Brokenhead	Dencross	218	135	PR 317 – Libau, Lac du Bonnet	
St. Clements		232	144	Stead Road – Gull Lake, Stead	Former PR 304; former PR 219
Alexander		237	147	PTH 59 south – Winnipeg	South end of PTH 59 concurrency
Alexander		239	149	PR 304 north / PR 500 north – Beaconia, Powerview-Pine Falls	
Alexander		247	153	PTH 59 north – Victoria Beach	North end of PTH 59 concurrency
St. Clements		251	156	PR 500 south – Beaconia	
St. Clements	Grand Marais	254	158	Grand Beach Provincial Park	
1.000 mi = 1.609 km; 1.000 km = 0.621 mi: Concurrency terminus; Route transition

== Related routes ==
=== Provincial Road 203 ===
Provincial Road 203
- Location: Woodridge
- Length: 46.0 km (28.6 mi)
- Existed: 1966–present

Provincial Road 203 (PR 203) is a 46.0-kilometre-long (28.6 mi) east-west loop off of PTH 12 in the Rural Municipalities of Piney and Stuartburn, providing access to the hamlets of Badger and Woodridge via the Sandilands Provincial Forest.

=== Provincial Road 310 ===
Provincial Road 310
- Location: South Junction to Roseau-South Junction Border Crossing
- Length: 4 km (2.5 mi)
- Existed: 1966–present

Provincial Road 310 (PR 310) is a short 4-kilometre-long (2.5 mi) north-south spur in the Rural Municipality of Piney, connecting PTH 12 at South Junction south to the Roseau-South Junction Border Crossing, which in turn provides a connection to the town of Roseau, Minnesota.
