= Manitoba Provincial Road 203 =

Provincial road in Manitoba, Canada

Provincial Road 203
- PR 203 highlighted in red

Route information
- Maintained by Manitoba Infrastructure
- Length: 46.0 km (28.6 mi)
- Existed: 1966–present

Major junctions
- South end: PTH 12 / PTH 89 near Piney
- PR 210 in Woodridge
- North end: PR 404 in Sandilands Provincial Forest

Location
- Country: Canada
- Province: Manitoba
- Rural municipalities: Piney; Stuartburn

Highway system
- Provincial highways in Manitoba; Winnipeg City Routes
← PR 202	→ PR 204

Provincial Road 203 (PR 203) is a provincial road in the southeastern part of the Eastman Region of the Canadian province of Manitoba.

== Route description ==
PR 203 begins at PR 404 approximately 75 metres (250 ft) north of the latter's junction with Provincial Trunk Highway (PTH) 12 and 11 kilometres (7 mi) east of Zhoda. It runs east to Woodridge, southeast to Badger, and then south to its terminus at PTH 12. From here, the road continues south as PTH 89, a paved highway leading to Piney and the Pinecreek–Piney Border Crossing.

PR 203 lies within Sandilands Provincial Forest and is a gravel road in its entirety.

== Major intersections ==
Division	Location	km	mi	Destinations	Notes
Piney		0.0	0.0	PTH 12 (MOM's Way) – Sprague, Steinbach; PTH 89 south to PR 201 – Piney	Southern terminus; road continues south as PTH 89
Piney	Sandilands Provincial Forest	12.1	7.5	Badger Road – Badger	
Piney	Sandilands Provincial Forest	22.4	13.9	Carrick Road – Carrick	
Piney	Woodridge	30.0– 30.1	18.6– 18.7	PR 210 – La Broquerie, Piney	Short concurrency (overlap) with PR 210 over a railroad crossing
Piney / Stuartburn boundary	Sandilands Provincial Forest	46.0	28.6	PR 404 to PTH 12 – Steinbach, Sandilands	Northern terminus; 0.1 kilometres (0.062 mi) from PR 404's intersection with PTH 12
1.000 mi = 1.609 km; 1.000 km = 0.621 mi: Concurrency terminus
