= Manitoba Provincial Road 404 =

Provincial Road in Manitoba, Canada

Provincial Route 404
- PR 404 highlighted in red

Route information
- Maintained by Department of Infrastructure
- Length: 23.9 km (14.9 mi)
- Existed: 1966–present

Major junctions
- South end: PTH 12 / PR 203 in Sandilands Provincial Forest
- North end: PR 210 in Sandilands Provincial Forest

Location
- Country: Canada
- Province: Manitoba
- Rural municipalities: Stuartburn, Piney, Reynolds

Highway system
- Provincial highways in Manitoba; Winnipeg City Routes
| ← PR 403 | → PR 405 |

Provincial Road 404 (PR 404) is a 23.9-kilometre-long (14.9 mi) north–south highway in the Eastman Region of Manitoba. Located entirely within the Sandilands Provincial Forest, it provides the primary road access to the hamlet of Sandilands.

== Route description ==
PR 404 begins along the border with the Rural Municipalities of Stuartburn and Piney at an intersection with PTH 12 (MOM's Way) between Zhoda and Piney, immediately having a junction with PR 203 just 0.1 kilometres (0.062 mi) later. Now an unpaved gravel road, it winds its way northeast through the wooded hills of the forest, crossing a railway line as it enters the town of Sandilands. Winding its way through the centre of town along 6th and 8th streets, PR 404 heads due north through remote woodlands for several kilometres to come to an end at a junction with PR 210 just west of Marchand Provincial Park.

== Major intersections ==
| Division | Location | km | mi | Destinations | Notes |
|---|---|---|---|---|---|
| Stuartburn–Piney boundary | Sandilands Provincial Forest | 0.0 | 0.0 | PTH 12 (MOM's Way) – Steinbach, Sprague | Southern terminus |
| Stuartburn–Piney boundary | Sandilands Provincial Forest | 0.1 | 0.062 | PR 203 east – Woodbridge | Western terminus of PR 203; pavement ends |
| Piney | No major junctions | | | | |
| Reynolds | Sandilands Provincial Forest | 23.9 | 14.9 | PR 210 – Marchand, Woodbridge | Northern terminus |
1.000 mi = 1.609 km; 1.000 km = 0.621 mi
