= Manitoba Highway 89 =

Highway in Manitoba

Provincial Trunk Highway 89

Route information
- Maintained by Department of Infrastructure
- Length: 10 km (6.2 mi)
- Existed: 1958–present

Major junctions
- South end: MN 89 at the U.S. border near Piney
- North end: PTH 12 / PR 203 near Piney

Location
- Country: Canada
- Province: Manitoba
- Rural municipalities: Piney

Highway system
- Provincial highways in Manitoba; Winnipeg City Routes
← PTH 83A	→ PTH 100 (TCH)

Provincial Trunk Highway 89 (PTH 89) is a provincial highway in the Canadian province of Manitoba. The entire road lies within the Rural Municipality of Piney and is 10 kilometres (6 miles) long. It runs from PTH 12 south to Piney and the U.S. border. South of the border it becomes Minnesota State Highway 89.

== Route description ==
PTH 89 begins at the Minnesota border, directly adjacent to the Piney Pinecreek Border Airport, with the road continuing south as Minnesota State Highway 89 towards Pinecreek and Roseau. The highway heads north through rural farmland for several kilometers, crossing the Pine Creek Ditch (a flood diversion channel for Pine Creek). It passes by a cemetery before traveling straight through the center of the community of Piney, with the highway serving as Main Street. PTH 89 enters a wooded area as it has a junction with PR 201 before coming to an end at an intersection with PTH 12 (MOM's Way), with the road continuing north towards Badger as PR 203.

The entire length of Manitoba Highway 89 is a rural, two-lane, paved highway, located entirely in the Rural Municipality of Piney.

== Major intersections ==
The entire route is in the Rural Municipality of Piney.

Location	km	mi	Destinations	Notes
	0.0	0.0	MN 89 south – Pinecreek, Roseau	Continuation into Minnesota
	0.0	0.0	Canada–United States border at Pinecreek–Piney Border Crossing	
	9.9	6.2	PR 201 west – Vita	
	10.0	6.2	PTH 12 (MOM's Way) – Steinbach, Sprague PR 203 north – Badger	Continues at PR 203 north
1.000 mi = 1.609 km; 1.000 km = 0.621 mi
