= Manitoba Provincial Road 500 =

Provincial road in Manitoba, Canada

Provincial Road 500

Route information
- Maintained by Manitoba Infrastructure
- Length: 11.0 km (6.8 mi)
- Existed: 1984–present

Major junctions
- South end: PTH 12 / PTH 59 / PR 304 north near Beconia
- North end: PTH 12 near Grand Marais

Location
- Country: Canada
- Province: Manitoba
- Rural municipalities: St. Clements

Highway system
- Provincial highways in Manitoba; Winnipeg City Routes
← PR 493	→ PR 501

Provincial Road 500 (PR 500) is a provincial secondary highway located in the Canadian province of Manitoba. It runs from PTH 12, southeast of Grand Beach, to PTH 12/PTH 59 near Beaconia.

== Route description ==
=== Communities along the route ===
- Beaconia

=== Notable places along the route ===
- Lake Winnipeg's east coast.
- Patricia and Grand beaches, clothing-optional.

== Major intersections ==
Division	Location	km	mi	Destinations	Notes
St. Clements		0.0	0.0	PTH 12 / PTH 59 / PR 304 north – Winnipeg, Steinbach, Victoria Beach	Southern Terminus
St. Clements		11.0	6.8	PTH 12 – Grand Beach Provincial Park, Winnipeg	Northern Terminus
1.000 mi = 1.609 km; 1.000 km = 0.621 mi
