= Manitoba Provincial Road 202 =

Provincial road in Manitoba, Canada

Provincial Road 202
- Bird's Hill Road
- PR 202 highlighted in red

Route information
- Maintained by Manitoba Infrastructure
- Length: 15 km (9.3 mi)
- Existed: 1966–present

Major junctions
- North end: PR 204 near Lockport
- South end: PTH 59 near Birds Hill

Location
- Country: Canada
- Province: Manitoba
- Rural municipalities: East St. Paul; St. Clements

Highway system
- Provincial highways in Manitoba; Winnipeg City Routes
← PR 201	→ PR 203

Provincial Road 202 (PR 202), also known as Birds Hill Road, is a provincial road in the Canadian province of Manitoba.

The road begins at PTH 59 near the community of Birds Hill northeast of Winnipeg and runs northeast along the west side of the Red River Floodway. It terminates at PR 204 (Henderson Highway) near Lockport.

Birds Hill Road was part of PTH 59's original course before the latter was rerouted to accommodate construction of the Floodway in the 1960s.

== Major intersections ==
Division	Location	km	mi	Destinations	Notes
East St. Paul	Birds Hill	0.0	0.0	PTH 59 (Lagimodiere Boulevard) – Winnipeg, Grand Beach	Southern terminus
St. Clements	Lockport	15	9.3	PR 204 (La Vérendrye Trail / Henderson Highway)	Northern terminus
1.000 mi = 1.609 km; 1.000 km = 0.621 mi
