= MOM's Way =

International tourist route

Route information
- Length: 657 km (408 mi)
- Component highways: PTH 12; MN 313; MN 11; MN 72; Highway 11

Major junctions
- West end: PTH 1 (TCH) / PTH 12 east of Winnipeg
- East end: Highway 11 / Highway 17 / Highway 61 in Thunder Bay

Location
- Country: Canada
- Provinces: Manitoba, Minnesota, Ontario

Highway system
- Provincial highways in Manitoba; Winnipeg City Routes
- Minnesota Trunk Highway System; Interstate; US; State; Legislative; Scenic
- Ontario provincial highways; Current; Former; 400-series

MOM's Way is the name for a series of highways in the Canadian provinces of Ontario and Manitoba, and the U.S. state of Minnesota. The name "MOM" is an acronym for Manitoba, Ontario, and Minnesota, the two provinces and one state traversed by this multi-highway route. MOM's Way provides a secondary route between the cities of Winnipeg, Manitoba and Thunder Bay, Ontario. Many segments of MOM's Way are connected to the Old Dawson Trail, the first all-Canadian route between Thunder Bay and Winnipeg.

The roads included along the route are:

- Manitoba Highway 12 between the Trans-Canada Highway (PTH 1), 40 km (25 mi) east of Winnipeg, through Steinbach and Sprague, to the Minnesota border.
- Minnesota State Highway 313 between the Manitoba border and Warroad.
- Minnesota State Highway 11 between Warroad and Baudette.
- Minnesota State Highway 72 through Baudette to the Ontario border.
- Ontario Highway 11 from the Minnesota border, through Rainy River and Fort Frances, to Thunder Bay.

== Major intersections ==
From west to east.

| State/Province | Location | km | mi | Destinations | Notes |
|---|---|---|---|---|---|
| Manitoba | near Ste. Anne | 0.0 | 0.0 | PTH 12 north – Beausejour PTH 1 (TCH) – Kenora, Winnipeg | Interchange; PTH 1 exit 375; MOM's Way western terminus |
| Manitoba | Ste. Anne | 2.7 | 1.7 | PR 207 (Dawson Road) – Lorette, Richer | Interchange |
| Manitoba | Steinbach | 19.9 | 12.4 | PTH 52 (Main Street) – Mitchell, La Broquerie | |
| Manitoba | | 100.6 | 62.5 | PTH 89 south / PR 203 north – Piney, Badger | |
| Canada–United States border (Warroad–Sprague Border Crossing) | | 147.6 | 91.7 | PTH 12 ends • MN 313 begins | |
| Minnesota | Warroad | 157.7 | 98.0 | MN 11 west / MN 313 ends – Roseau | MOM's Way follows MN 11 east |
| Minnesota | Baudette | 216.5 | 134.5 | MN 172 north – Wheeler's Point | |
| Minnesota | Baudette | 218.0 | 135.5 | MN 11 east / MN 72 south – International Falls, Blackduck | MOM's Way follows MN 72 north |
| Canada–United States border (Baudette–Rainy River Border Crossing) | | 218.8 | 136.0 | Baudette–Rainy River International Bridge across Rainy River MN 72 ends • Highway 11 begins | |
| Ontario | Rainy River | 219.1 | 136.1 | Highway 600 north (B Street) | |
| Ontario | | 270.9 | 168.3 | Highway 71 north / TCH – Kenora | West end of Highway 71 concurrency; west end of TCH designation |
| Ontario | Fort Frances | 312.8 | 194.4 | Highway 71 south – International Falls | East end of Highway 71 concurrency |
| Ontario | | 457.3 | 284.2 | Highway 11B north – Atikokan | |
| Ontario | Shabaqua Corner | 592.6 | 368.2 | Highway 17 west / TCH – Dryden, Kenora | West end of Highway 17 concurrency |
| Ontario | | 613.6 | 381.3 | Highway 102 east (Dawson Road) | |
| Ontario | | 644.5 | 400.5 | Highway 130 (Arthur Street) – Rosslyn | |
| Ontario | Thunder Bay | 656.7 | 408.1 | Highway 11 east / Highway 17 east / Highway 61 south / TCH – Cochrane, Sault Ste. Marie, Duluth Harbour Expressway east | MOM's Way eastern terminus |
1.000 mi = 1.609 km; 1.000 km = 0.621 mi: Concurrency terminus; Route transition

== See also ==
- Old Dawson Trail
