= Manitoba Provincial Road 403 =

Provincial Road in Manitoba, Canada

Provincial Road 403
- PR 403 highlighted in red

Route information
- Maintained by Department of Infrastructure
- Length: 25.5 km (15.8 mi)
- Existed: 1966–present

Major junctions
- West end: PTH 59 in St. Malo
- PR 216 north of Rosa
- East end: PTH 12 north of Zhoda

Location
- Country: Canada
- Province: Manitoba
- Rural municipalities: De Salaberry, Hanover, La Broquerie

Highway system
- Provincial highways in Manitoba; Winnipeg City Routes
← PR 399	→ PR 404

Provincial Road 403 (PR 403) is a 25.5-kilometre-long (15.8 mi) east–west highway in the Eastman Region of Manitoba, Canada. It connects the town of St. Malo with Pansy and, via PTH 12 (MOM's Way), the city Steinbach.

== Route description ==
PR 403 begins along the banks of the Rat River in the Rural Municipality of De Salaberry at an intersection with PTH 59 on the northern edge of St. Malo. It heads east as a paved two-lane highway along the northern border of St. Malo Provincial Park before having a junction with PR 216, where the pavement turns to gravel. The highway travels through Barkfield before entering the Rural Municipality of Hanover and passing through the community of Pansy. Entering the Rural Municipality of La Broquerie, where it comes to an end at an intersection with PTH 12 just north of Zhoda.

== Major intersections ==
Division	Location	km	mi	Destinations	Notes
De Salaberry	St. Malo	0.0	0.0	PTH 59 – St. Malo, St-Pierre-Jolys	Western terminus
De Salaberry		7.5	4.7	PR 216 – Grunthal, Rosa	Pavement ends
Hanover	No major junctions				
La Broquerie		25.5	15.8	PTH 12 (MOM's Way) – Steinbach, Warroad	Eastern terminus
1.000 mi = 1.609 km; 1.000 km = 0.621 mi
