= Warroad–Sprague Border Crossing =

Port of entry on the Canada-United States border

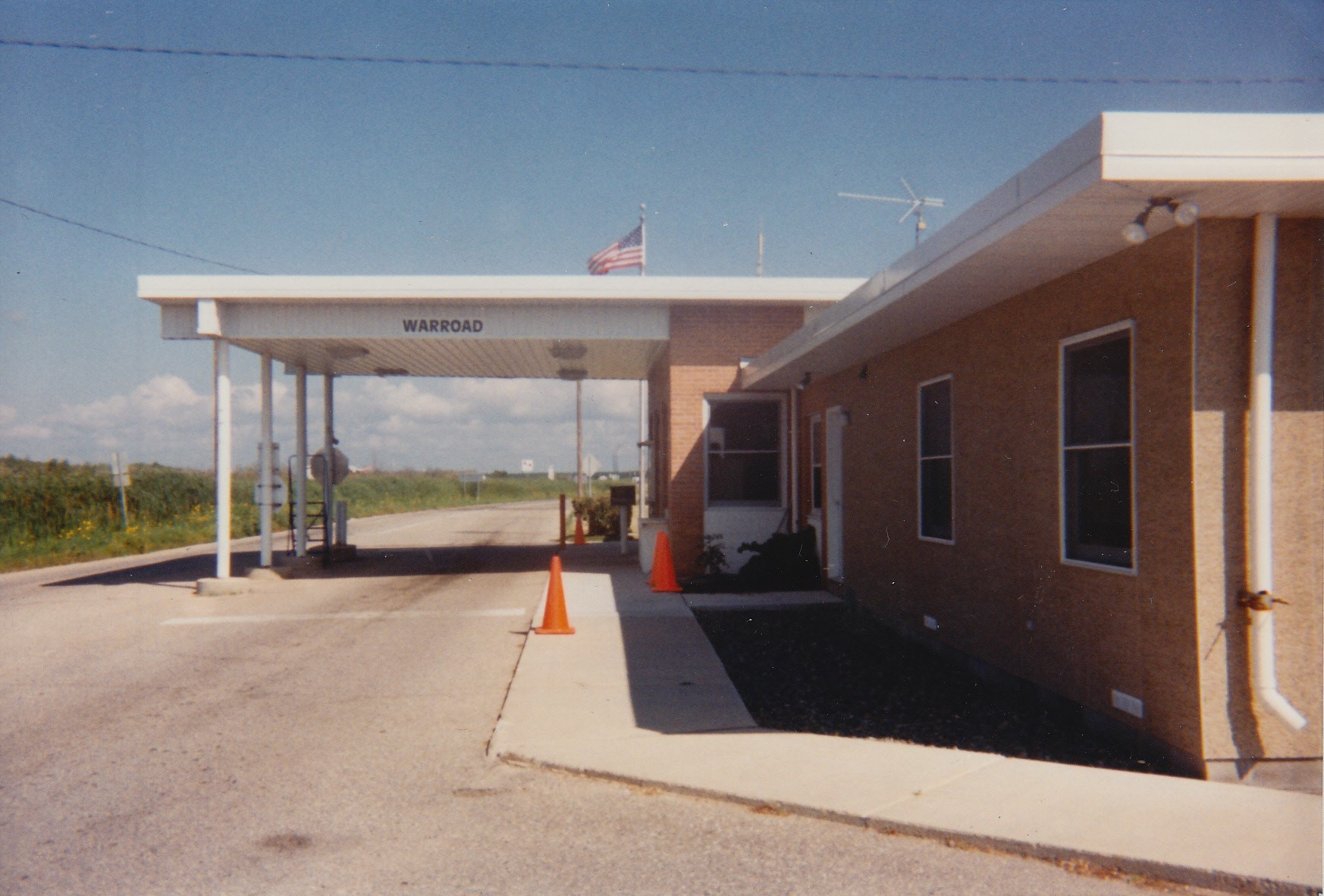
- Former US Border Station at Warroad, MN, 1998

Locaiton
- Country: United States; Canada
- Location: MN 313 / PTH 12; US Port: 41059 Minnesota State Highway 313, Warroad, MN 56763-9411; Canadian Port: Manitoba Highway 12, Sprague, Manitoba R0A 1Z0
- Coordinates: 48°59′56″N 95°22′34″W

Details
- Opened: 1901

Website
- US Canadian

The Warroad–Sprague Border Crossing connects the city of Warroad, Minnesota, and the community of Sprague, Manitoba, on the Canada–United States border. Minnesota State Highway 313 on the American side joins Manitoba Highway 12 on the Canadian side. The crossing is:

- on MOM's Way between Thunder Bay, Ontario and Ste. Anne, Manitoba.
- the easternmost along the 2,030-kilometre (1,261 mi) part of the international border that follows the 49th parallel north between the Salish Sea on the Pacific Coast and the Lake of the Woods.
- used for travel between Northwest Angle and Minnesota proper. A school bus makes this journey twice daily.

The adjacent Canadian National Railway track across the border, which links eastward to Rainy River, Ontario, is isolated from other US trackage.

== Canadian side ==
In 1901, the customs office opened under the administrative oversight of the Port of Winnipeg. In 1925, a new building was erected at Sprague.

The customs building was replaced in 1973.

== US side ==
The Border Patrol Station was established around 1924, closed during World War II, and reopened in 1955.

While on patrol near Roseau in 1928, Robert H. Lobdell, a Warroad officer, was fatally shot by an individual who had illegally entered the US.

The Warroad border station, which was built in 1962, was replaced by a new facility in 2010. About one-half mile (805 m) south of the previous station, the new complex employs advanced technologies and includes two high low booths, two commercial truck docks and two enclosed passenger vehicle bays for detailed inspections.

During the 2020/21 and 2021/22 winters, an ice road was built over the frozen lake to connect Northwest Angle with the rest of Minnesota.

In 2022, the highway south to Roseau was designated the Richard K. Magnuson Deputy Memorial Highway in memory of the deputy sheriff who intercepted border runner Gregory McMaster in 1978. McMaster fatally shot Magnuson, the final victim of the serial killer.

== Traffic volumes ==
During earlier decades, passenger trains created much of the customs work. To expedite inspections, Canadian and US customs officers processed passengers while the trains were en route. In 1930, US officers Laurence E. Doten and Lawrence C. Jones were fatally shot in the line of the duty on a westbound passenger train.

The significant rail freight includes seasonal grain harvests. In later decades, highway traffic became the primary customs activity.

== See also ==
- List of Canada–United States border crossings
