= Manitoba Provincial Road 207 =

Provincial road in Manitoba, Canada

Provincial Road 207
- Dawson Road (section); Deacon's Road (section)
- PR 207 highlighted in red
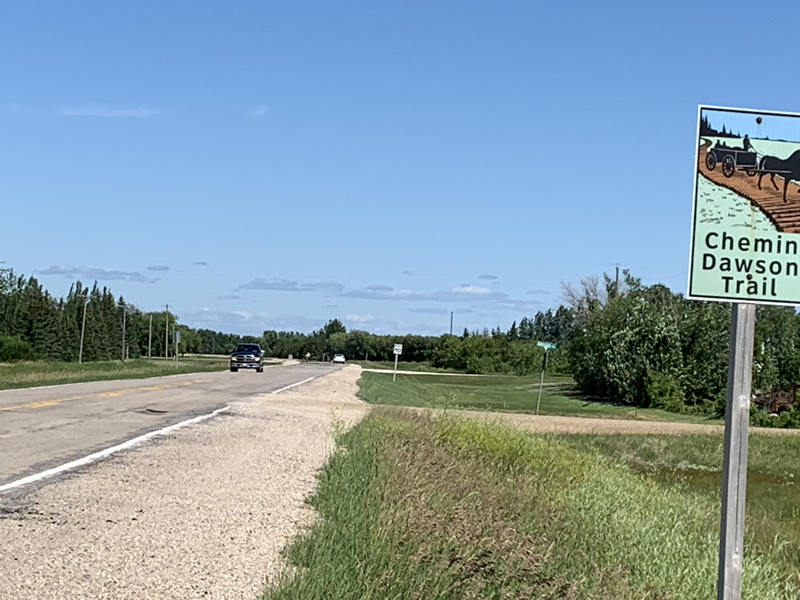

Route information
- Maintained by Manitoba Infrastructure
- Length: 56.7 km (35.2 mi)
- Existed: 1966–present

Major junctions
- North end: PR 213 in Pine Ridge
- PTH 15 near Transcona; PTH 1 (TCH) in Deacons Corner; PTH 12 near Ste. Anne
- East end: PTH 1 (TCH) in La Coulée

Location
- Country: Canada
- Province: Manitoba
- Rural municipalities: Springfield; Ste. Anne; Taché
- Towns: Ste. Anne

Highway system
- Provincial highways in Manitoba; Winnipeg City Routes
← PR 206	→ PR 209

Provincial Road 207 (PR 207) is a 56.7-kilometre-long (35.2 mi) provincial road in the Eastman Region of Manitoba, Canada. Much of PR 207 follows the historic Old Dawson Trail.

PR 207 actually switches cardinal directions from north–south to east–west at its intersection with PTH 1 (Trans-Canada Highway) in Deacons Corner.

== Route description ==
PR 207 begins at PR 213 (Garven Road), northeast of Winnipeg and heads south, intersecting PTH 15 and then the Trans-Canada Highway (PTH 1) at a junction known as Deacon's Corner. Five kilometres south of the Trans-Canada Highway, the road turns east and follows the old Dawson Road route to the communities of Lorette, Dufresne, and Ste. Anne. Approximately seven kilometres west of Richer, PR 207 turns north and ends at the Trans-Canada Highway.

PR 207 is a paved, two-lane road, except between Dufresne and Ste. Anne, where it is a gravel road. The road has a speed limit of 90 km/h.

The Dawson Road segment of PR 207 between Lorette and Ste. Anne was the original course for PTH 12. A more direct route for PTH 12 was later built to the north; this route is now PTH 1.

== Major intersections ==
Division	Location	km	mi	Destinations	Notes
Springfield	Pine Ridge	0.0	0.0	PR 213 (Garven Road) – Winnipeg, Cooks Creek	Northern terminus; PR 207 begins along Deacon Road; road continues north as Deacon Road
Springfield		8.7	5.4	Bridge over Cooks Creek Diversion	
Springfield		9.8	6.1	PTH 15 (Dugald Road) – Anola, Winnipeg	
Springfield	Deacons Corner	17.1	10.6	PTH 1 (TCH) – Winnipeg, Kenora	PR 207 switches cardinal directions from north-south to east-west
Taché		22.5	14.0	Dawson Road – Prairie Grove	PR 207 begins following Dawson Road
Taché	Lorette	28.3	17.6	St. Amant Road to PR 405 – Île-des-Chênes, Landmark	
Taché		32.4	20.1	PR 206 – Landmark, Dugald	
Taché	Dufrense	39.0	24.2	Road 32E to PTH 1 (TCH) – Winnipeg, Kenora	Western end of unpaved section
Ste. Anne		46.6– 47.2	29.0– 29.3	PTH 12 (MOM's Way) – Steinbach, Beausejour	Interchange; eastern end of unpaved section
City of Ste. Anne		47.9	29.8	PR 210 west (Traverse Road)	Western end of PR 210 concurrency (overlap)
City of Ste. Anne		49.8	30.9	PR 210 south – La Broquerie	Eastern end of PR 210 concurrency
Ste. Anne	La Coulée	55.9	34.7	Dawson Road – Richer	PR 207 begins following Municipal Road 40E
Ste. Anne	La Coulée	56.7	35.2	PTH 1 (TCH) – Winnipeg, Kenora	Eastern terminus; road continues as Municipal Road 40E
1.000 mi = 1.609 km; 1.000 km = 0.621 mi: Concurrency terminus; Route transition
