= Minnesota State Highway 313 =

State highway in Minnesota, United States

Trunk Highway 313
- MN 313 highlighted in red

Route information
- Maintained by MnDOT
- Length: 6.267 mi (10.086 km)
- Existed: April 24, 1959–present

Major junctions
- South end: MN 11 in Warroad
- North end: PTH 12 at the Canadian border in Longworth

Location
- Country: United States
- State: Minnesota
- Counties: Roseau

Highway system
- Minnesota Trunk Highway System; Interstate; US; State; Legislative; Scenic
← MN 310	→ MN 316

Minnesota State Highway 313 (MN 313) is a highway in northwest Minnesota, which runs from its intersection with State Highway 11 in Warroad and continues north to its northern terminus at the Canada–US border; where the route becomes Manitoba Highway 12 upon crossing the border, near the communities of Middlebro and Sprague, Manitoba.

The route is 6.3 miles (10.1 km) in length.

== Route description ==
Highway 313 serves as a short north–south route in northwest Minnesota between the city of Warroad and the Canada–US border.

The roadway is part of the promoted route MOM's Way, a tourist route from Thunder Bay to Winnipeg.

Highway 313 generally follows not far from the southwest corner of the Lake of the Woods throughout its route.

The route is legally defined as Route 313 in the Minnesota Statutes.

== History ==
Highway 313 was authorized on April 24, 1959.

The route was paved in 1962.

== Major intersections ==
The entire route is in Roseau County.

Location	mi	km	Destinations	Notes
Warroad	0.000	0.000	MN 11 – Roseau, Warroad	Southern terminus
Warroad	0.331	0.533	CSAH 74	
Warroad	1.138	1.831	CSAH 13 west – Roseau Municipal Airport	
Lake Township	2.202	3.544	CSAH 13 east (Springsteel Road)	
Lake Township	3.296	5.304	CR 137	
Lake Township	6.266	10.084	PTH 12	Continuation into Manitoba
1.000 mi = 1.609 km; 1.000 km = 0.621 mi
