= Gardenton, Manitoba =

Human settlement in Manitoba, Canada

Coordinates: 49°05′13″N 96°41′42″W

Gardenton is a community in the Canadian province of Manitoba. It is located in the Rural Municipality of Stuartburn, approximately 9 kilometres (6 miles) north of the Canada–United States border.
