= La Coulée, Manitoba =

La Coulée
- Unincorporated community
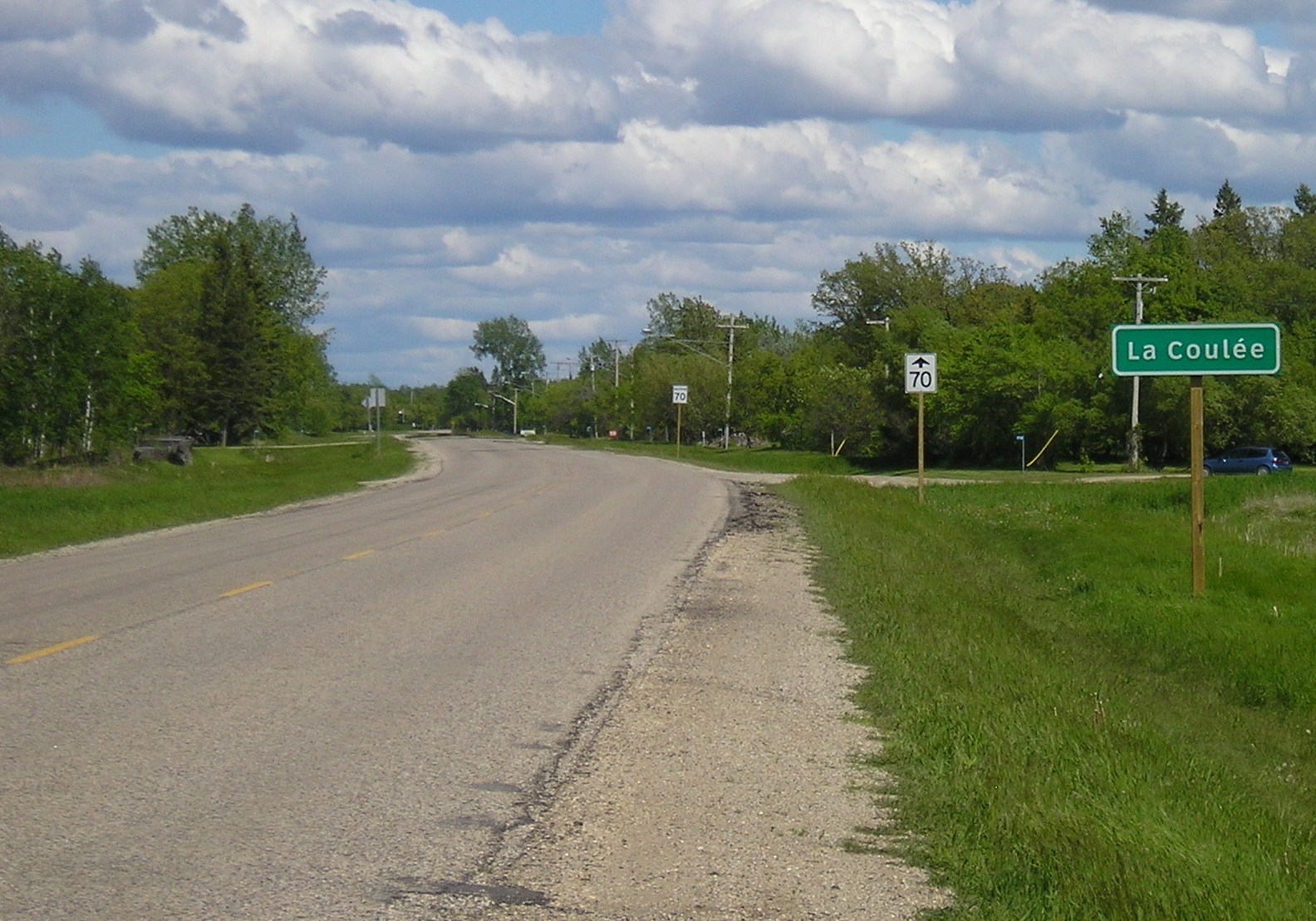

- Location of La Coulée
- Coordinates: 49°39′30″N 96°35′00″W
- Country: Canada
- Province: Manitoba
- Rural municipality: Ste. Anne
- Region: Eastman
- Time zone: UTC-6 (CST)

La Coulée is a rural residential area in the Rural Municipality of Ste. Anne, south-eastern Manitoba, Canada, named for the creek running along its southern border.

== Location ==
La Coulée is about 3 km (1.9 mi) east of Sainte-Anne-des-Chênes, more commonly known as Ste. Anne. It is within 50 km (31 mi) southeast of Winnipeg, and less than half an hour north from Steinbach. It is within the Rural Municipality of Ste. Anne and therefore its emergency services are provided by the rural municipality. The closest hospital is in Sainte-Anne as well as the nearest post-office.

== Economy ==
Businesses in La Coulée include two hairdressers, a junkyard, a water dealer, a mechanic, and a golf course.

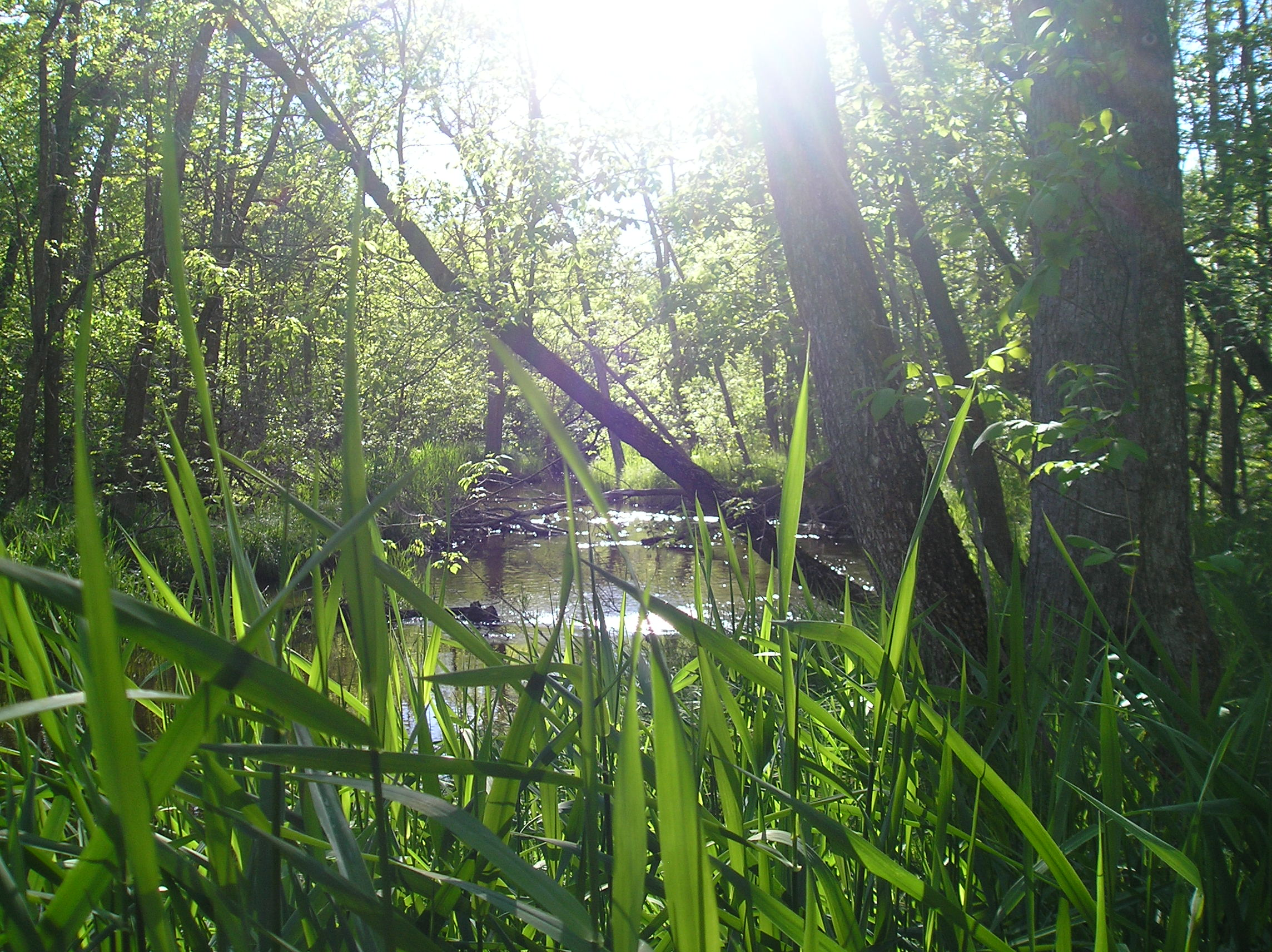
La Coulée, the creek along the community
