= Ernie Anderson (ice hockey) =

Canadian ice hockey player

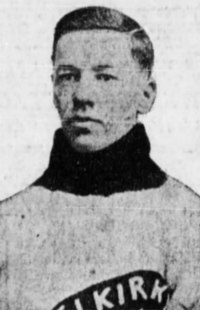
- Anderson with the Selkirk Fishermen
- Born: December 9, 1898; St. Clements, Manitoba, Canada
- Died: January 18, 1977 (aged 78); Calgary, Alberta, Canada
- Height: 5 ft 6 in (168 cm)
- Weight: 130 lb (59 kg; 9 st 4 lb)
- Position: Right wing
- Shot: Right
- Played for: Regina Capitals; Calgary Tigers; Edmonton Eskimos; Minneapolis Millers; Duluth Hornets
- Playing career: 1918–1935

Ernest Ridley Anderson (December 9, 1898 – January 18, 1977) was a Canadian professional ice hockey player. He played with the Regina Capitals, Calgary Tigers, and Edmonton Eskimos of the Western Canada Hockey League. He also played in the American Hockey Association with Minneapolis and Duluth.
