= Arbakka, Manitoba =

Coordinates: 49°03′14″N 96°28′39″W

Arbakka is an unincorporated community in the Rural Municipality of Stuartburn, in the southeast corner of Manitoba, Canada, south of Vita near the border with the United States. This region is sparsely populated, and its major exports are farmed goods and hogs.

There was a short-lived Icelandic settlement in Arbakka.

In 2012, Arbakka was listed as one of the "endemic or suspected areas for established black legged tick (BLT) populations", with other areas in southern Manitoba under investigation; the tick is the primary vector of three diseases: Lyme disease, Anaplasmosis and Babesiosis.
