= Grand Beach (Manitoba) =

Beach on the eastern shore of Lake Winnipeg in Manitoba, Canada

- Beach
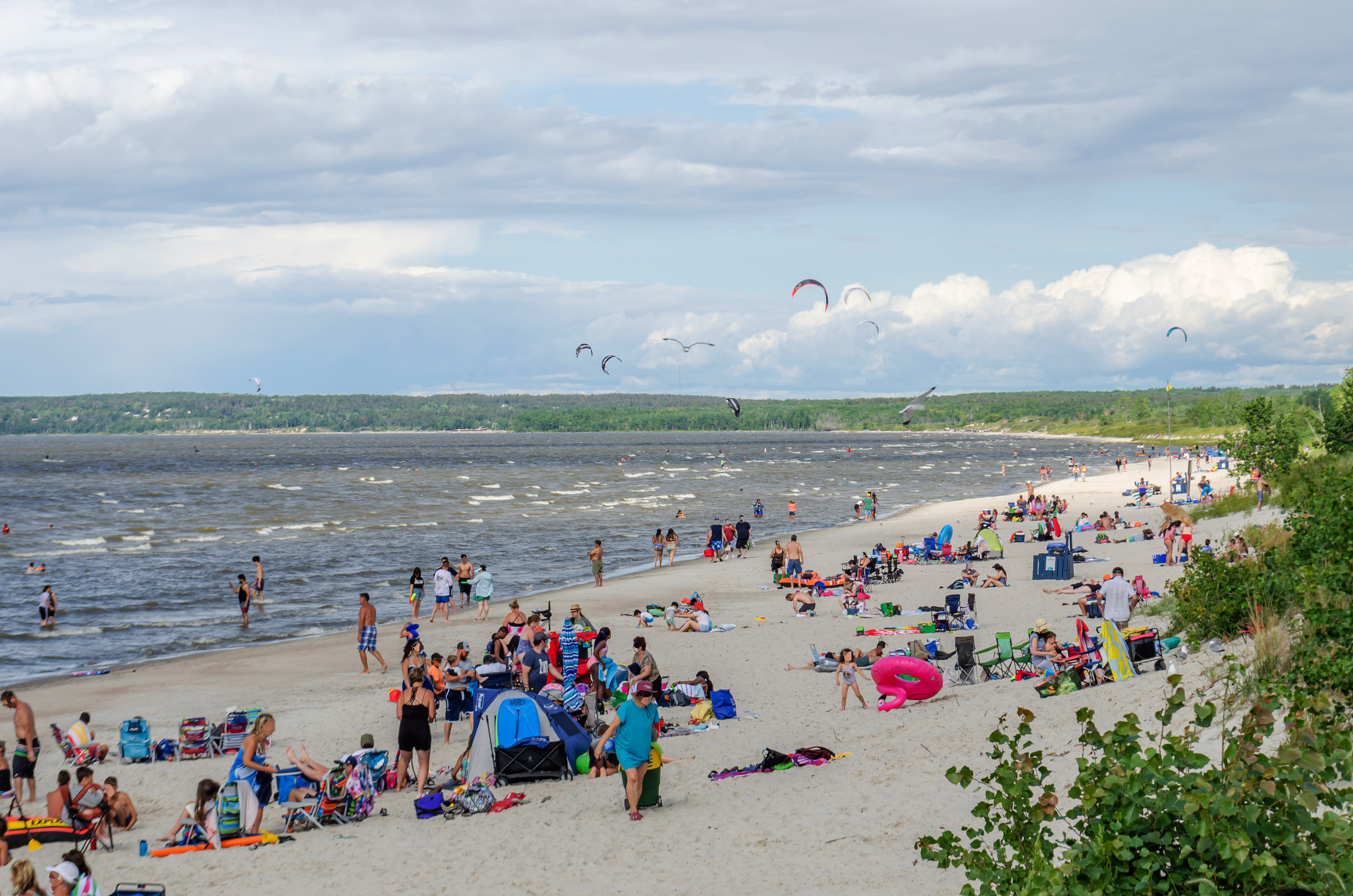
- Grand Beach and Provincial Park on the shores of Lake Winnipeg in August 2020
- Interactive map of Grand Beach
- Coordinates: 50°33′15″N 96°38′00″W
- Location: Rural Municipality of St. Clements
- Part of: Lake Winnipeg
- Age: 430-490 million years
- Formed by: Lake Agassiz
- Operator: Province of Manitoba

Area
  - Total: 30 ha (75 acres)

Dimensions
  - Length: 3 kilometres (1.9 mi)
- Elevation: 228 m (748 ft)
- Topo map: NTS 62I10 Victoria Beach
- Website: grandbeachtourism.com

Grand Beach is a freshwater beach located within the Rural Municipality of St. Clements on the eastern shore of Lake Winnipeg in Manitoba, Canada. It is located on the northern edge of the town of Grand Marais, Manitoba. Grand Beach is on the historic La Vérendrye Trail .

== History ==
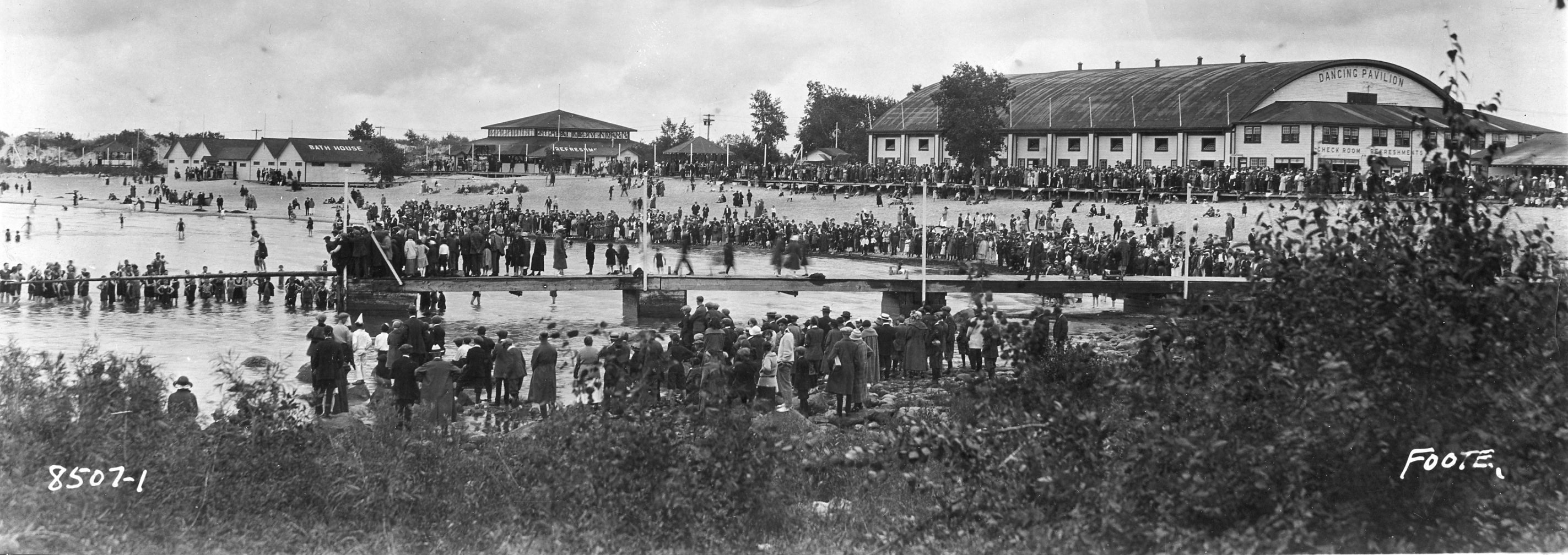
View of Grand Beach in August 1924 by L.B. Foote showing the pier, dance hall, carousel, bath houses and boardwalk.

Founded by homesteaders, it was home to a substantial community of Métis, who were the only settlers until the Canadian Northern Railway built its line and set up the resort along the Grand Beach in 1917. After it was made accessible by the railway, it became a very popular resort for Manitobans.

In the early days, the grandest building in the resort was the Dance Pavilion, built in 1918 and rated by some as the largest dance hall of its time in the Commonwealth, but it was destroyed in a fire that began at 11 am on September 5, 1950. Prior to the fire, CNR had put the resort buildings up for sale. Along with the incredible beaches, the dance hall made Grand Beach a very attractive day trip destination for Winnipeggers in the 1920s, that was made possible by regular train services to Winnipeg, with the last train leaving at midnight. A Harvey J. Emke of Winnipeg bought the properties from CNR in 1951.

== Sites and attractions ==
Grand Beach is part of Grand Beach Provincial Park and features 3 kilometres (1.9 mi) of fine, white sand and is backed by sand dunes that rise up to 12 m (39 ft) above the beach. A boardwalk at the West end of the beach offers food and shopping. Change rooms and plumbed washrooms are available all along the beach.

== Annual events ==
- Canada Day Family Festival
- Grand Marais Family Festival
- Manitoba Summerfest
- Beaches Half Marathon
