= Pansy, Manitoba =

Pansy
- Village
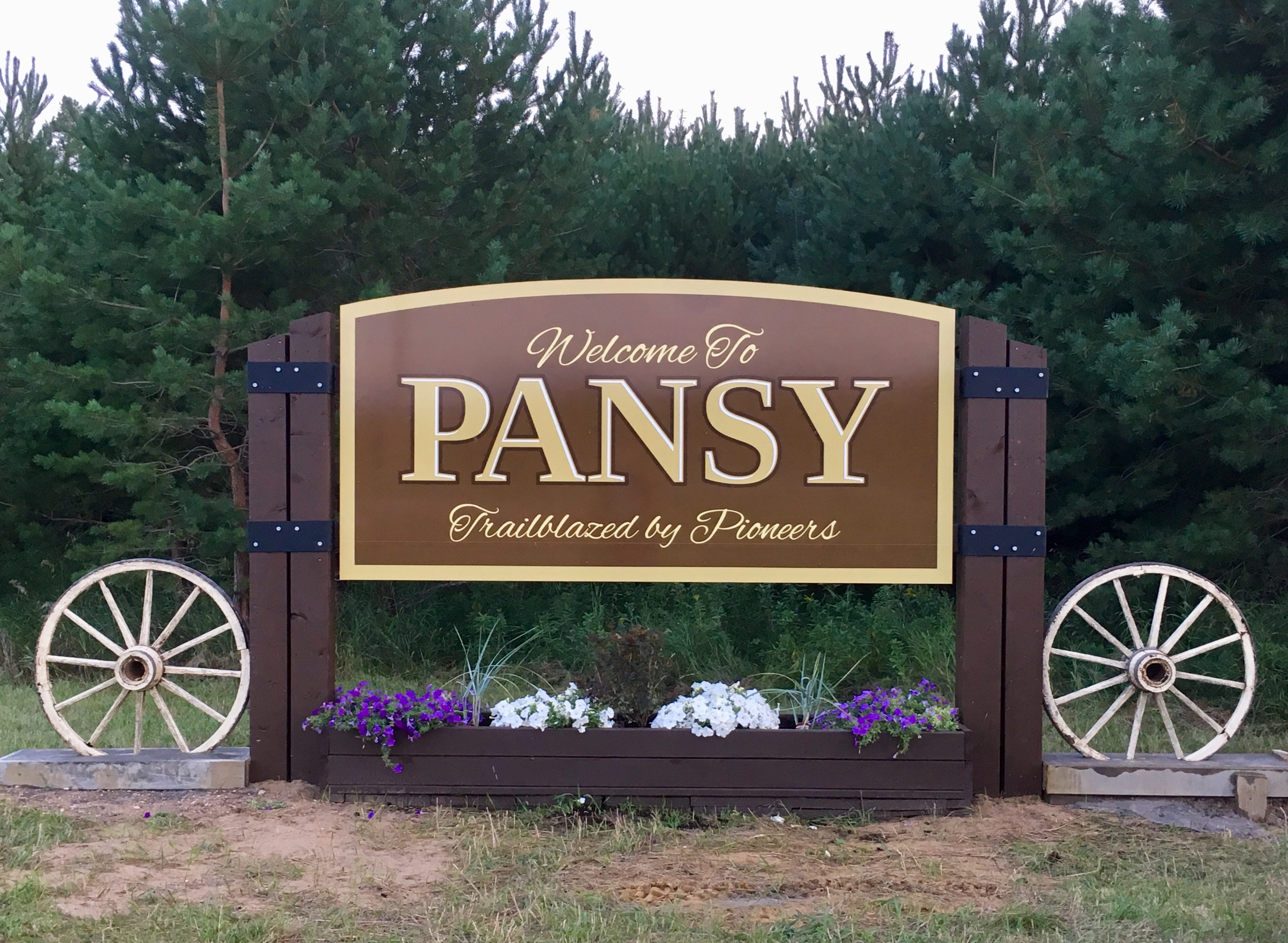
- Pansy Welcome Sign

- Location of Pansy in Manitoba.
- Coordinates: 49°19′34″N 96°42′52″W
- Country: Canada
- Province: Manitoba

Government
  - MP (Provencher): Ted Falk (CPC)
  - MLA (La Verendrye): Konrad Narth (PC)
  - Reeve (Hanover): Stan Toews
  - Councillor (Ward 4): Dylan Barkman
- Elevation: 287 m (942 ft)
- Time zone: UTC-6 (CST)
  - Summer (DST): UTC-5 (CDT)
- Postal Code: R0A 1J0

Pansy is an unincorporated community in Manitoba, Canada, within the Rural Municipality of Hanover. The community is centred on Provincial Road 403, approximately 22 kilometres (14 mi) south of Steinbach and 17 kilometres (11 mi) east of Saint Malo.

A post office was opened in 1928 and a Ukrainian Catholic church and cemetery were established in 1952.

Pansy is known for its Fall Supper on the second Sunday of September. In 2016, 1,600 people were served, coming from across Manitoba and beyond.
