= Rural Municipality of Piney =

Rural municipality in Manitoba, Canada

Piney
- Rural municipality
- Rural Municipality of Piney
- Location of the Rural Municipality of Piney in Manitoba
- Coordinates: 49°12′25″N 95°50′00″W
- Country: Canada
- Province: Manitoba
- Census Division: No. 1

Government
  - Reeve: Wayne Anderson

Area
  - Land: 2,430.32 km^{2} (938.35 sq mi)

Population (2021)
  - Total: 1,842
  - Density: 0.8/km^{2} (2.1/sq mi)
- Area code(s): 204

The Rural Municipality of Piney is a rural municipality (RM) in southeastern Manitoba, Canada, along the border with Minnesota in the United States.

== Geography ==
According to Statistics Canada, the municipality has a land area of 2,433.77 km^{2}. It is bordered by the rural municipalities of Stuartburn, La Broquerie, and Reynolds, as well as the Buffalo Point 36 Indian reserve and an unorganized part of the province (Division No. 1, Unorganized, Manitoba).

The municipality borders Roseau County in the U.S. state of Minnesota. There are three international border crossings in Piney, the most of any Manitoba municipality: Pinecreek–Piney, Roseau–South Junction, and Warroad–Sprague Border Crossings.

A minority but large part of Sandilands Provincial Forest is located here, as is a small part of Northwest Angle Provincial Forest. Also, Cat Hills Provincial Forest and Wampum Provincial Forest are both entirely located here, but these two forests are relatively tiny in size.

=== Communities ===
- Badger
- Carrick
- Menisino
- Middlebro
- Piney
- St. Labre
- Sandilands
- South Junction
- Sprague
- Vassar
- Wampum
- Woodridge

=== Climate ===
Climate data for Piney
Month	Jan	Feb	Mar	Apr	May	Jun	Jul	Aug	Sep	Oct	Nov	Dec	Year
Record high °C (°F)	7 (45)	11.5 (52.7)	18 (64)	31 (88)	33 (91)	35 (95)	38 (100)	36.5 (97.7)	35 (95)	29 (84)	19 (66)	9.5 (49.1)	38 (100)
Mean daily maximum °C (°F)	−10.7 (12.7)	−6.7 (19.9)	0.9 (33.6)	10.9 (51.6)	18.9 (66.0)	22.8 (73.0)	25.3 (77.5)	24.3 (75.7)	18.5 (65.3)	10.7 (51.3)	−0.3 (31.5)	−8.6 (16.5)	8.9 (48.0)
Daily mean °C (°F)	−16.4 (2.5)	−12 (10)	−4.6 (23.7)	4.3 (39.7)	11.7 (53.1)	16.3 (61.3)	18.8 (65.8)	18 (64)	12.1 (53.8)	5.1 (41.2)	−4.4 (24.1)	−13.5 (7.7)	3 (37)
Mean daily minimum °C (°F)	−22.1 (−7.8)	−17.6 (0.3)	−10 (14)	−2.3 (27.9)	4.3 (39.7)	9.9 (49.8)	12.3 (54.1)	11 (52)	5.6 (42.1)	−0.4 (31.3)	−8.6 (16.5)	−18.4 (−1.1)	−3 (27)
Record low °C (°F)	−46 (−51)	−48.5 (−55.3)	−38.5 (−37.3)	−22 (−8)	−9 (16)	−3 (27)	1.5 (34.7)	−3 (27)	−9 (16)	−20 (−4)	−40.5 (−40.9)	−43.5 (−46.3)	−48.5 (−55.3)
Average precipitation mm (inches)	25.2 (0.99)	20.6 (0.81)	23.1 (0.91)	29.1 (1.15)	64.8 (2.55)	105.2 (4.14)	89 (3.5)	76.9 (3.03)	62.3 (2.45)	51.6 (2.03)	31.1 (1.22)	24.9 (0.98)	603.8 (23.77)
Average rainfall mm (inches)	0.2 (0.01)	3.5 (0.14)	9 (0.4)	21.1 (0.83)	64.5 (2.54)	105.2 (4.14)	89 (3.5)	76.9 (3.03)	62.3 (2.45)	46 (1.8)	12.4 (0.49)	1 (0.0)	491.1 (19.33)
Average snowfall cm (inches)	25 (9.8)	17.1 (6.7)	14.1 (5.6)	8 (3.1)	0.3 (0.1)	0 (0)	0 (0)	0 (0)	0 (0)	5.6 (2.2)	18.7 (7.4)	24 (9.4)	112.7 (44.4)
Source: Environment Canada

== Demographics ==
In the 2021 Census of Population conducted by Statistics Canada, Piney had a population of 1,843 living in 804 of its 1,172 total private dwellings, a change of 6.8% from its 2016 population of 1,726. With a land area of 2,430.32 km^{2} (938.35 sq mi), it had a population density of 0.8/km^{2} (2.0/sq mi) in 2021.

In 2001, there were 690 housing units at an average density of 0.28/km^{2}. 2.4% of the people in the municipality are members of a visible minority.

Of the 695 households, 24.5% had a couple (married or common law) with children, 38.1% had a couple without children, 26.6% had one person, and 10.1% had another household type. The average household size was 2.43 and the average family size was 3.48.

In the municipality the population was spread out, with 18.0% under the age of 15, 11.0% from 15 to 24, 22.3% from 25 to 44, 29.1% from 45 to 64, and 19.9% 65 or older. The median age was 44.2 years. For every 100 females there were 113.9 males. For every 100 females age 15 and over, there were 103.6 males.

The median household income was $32,237 and the median family income was $39,525. Males had a median income of $23,726 versus $19,268 for females. The per capita income for the municipality was $10,043.

Historical census populations – Rural Municipality of Piney

Year	Pop.	±%
1976	1,983	—
1981	1,890	−4.7%
1986	1,781	−5.8%
1991	1,559	−12.5%
1996	1,604	+2.9%

Year	Pop.	±%
2001	1,688	+5.2%
2006	1,755	+4.0%
2011	1,720	−2.0%
2016	1,726	+0.3%
2021	1,843	+6.8%

Source: Statistics Canada

== Gallery ==
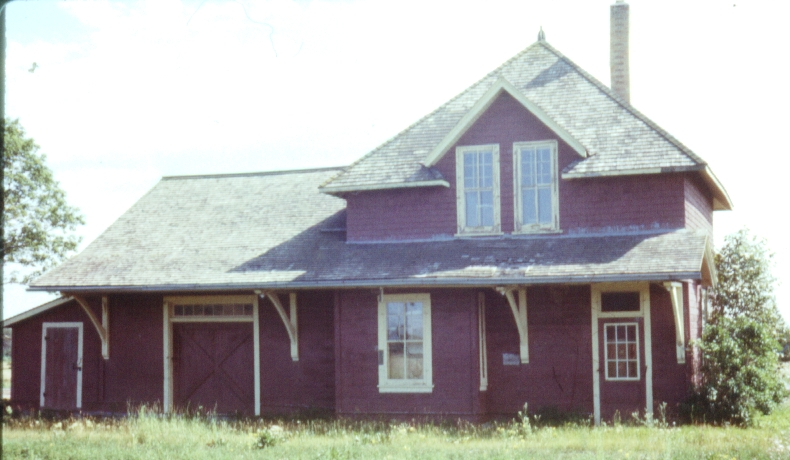
Piney's Canadian National Station, 1979

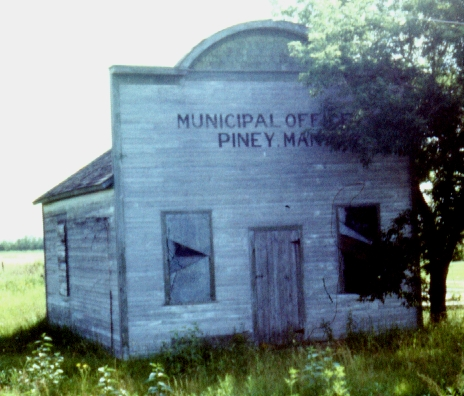
Piney's old municipal office, 1979

== See also ==
- List of francophone communities in Manitoba
- Pinecreek–Piney Border Crossing
- Roseau–South Junction Border Crossing
- Warroad–Sprague Border Crossing
