= Pinecreek–Piney Border Crossing =

Crossing between the U.S. and Canada

- Pinecreek–Piney Border Crossing as seen in 1998

Locaiton
- Country: United States; Canada
- Location: MN 89 / PTH 89; US Port: 41937 MN 89, Roseau, MN 56751; Canadian Port: Manitoba Highway 89, Piney MB R0A 1K0
- Coordinates: 49°00′00″N 95°58′41″W

Details
- Opened: 1922

Website
- US Canadian

The Pinecreek–Piney Border Crossing connects the communities of Pinecreek, Minnesota and Piney, Manitoba on the Canada–United States border. Minnesota State Highway 89 on the American side joins Manitoba Highway 89 on the Canadian side.

== Canadian side ==
In 1922–23, a customs postal collecting station was established. In 1925, when a customs office assumed all customs activities, W.T. Holden was the inaugural customs officer. The Port of Winnipeg provided administrative oversight.

The border station building was replaced in 1953. Around 1958, a new highway was built from Winnipeg to the crossing.

In 2020, the former border hours of 9am–10pm reduced, becoming 9am–5pm.

== US side ==
The early border patrol history is unclear, but assumedly the US mirrored the establishment of a permanent post at least by the 1920s. In 1958, a brick border station and two staff residences were built. The station building was replaced in 2012.

The crossing is the least busy in Minnesota, with an average of fewer than 25 cars a day.

== Airport ==
Although operated by the Minnesota Department of Transportation, the adjacent Piney Pinecreek Border Airport's runway crosses the international border. Access roads to the airport exist on both sides of the border. Small aircraft can land from either country, be inspected by officers from the other country and if admitted, continue to fly into the other country. Some pilots not crossing the border have reported unpleasant experiences at this airport.

== See also ==
- List of Canada–United States border crossings
