= Sandilands Provincial Forest =

Protected forest in Manitoba, Canada

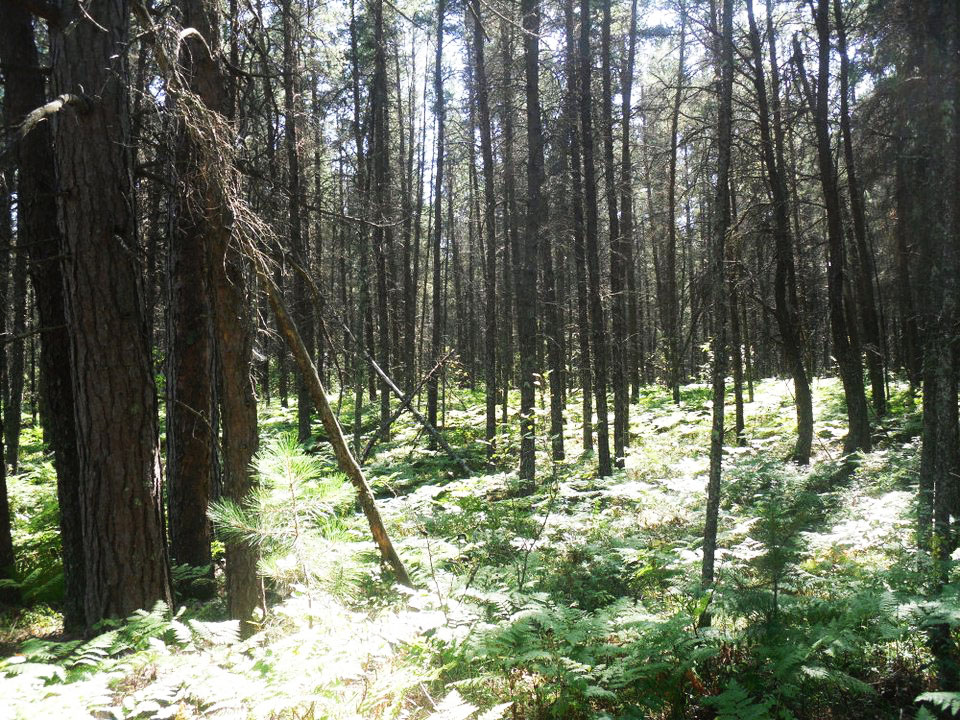
- Jack pine forest in the Spur Woods Wildlife Management Area, part of the Sandilands Provincial Forest

- Location within Manitoba

Geography
- Location: Eastman Region, Manitoba
- Coordinates: 49.399722°N 96.035278°W

The Sandilands Provincial Forest is a forest located within the southeastern area of Manitoba, Canada, and consists of thousands of acres of sand hills, forest, wetlands, and mostly unpopulated Crown lands. Sandilands Provincial Forest covers close to 3,000 km^{2}. It includes trails for hiking, driven through on all-terrain vehicles, or ridden over on horseback.

Under The Forest Act, Manitoba's provincial forests were developed primarily as a source of sustainable timber supply for forestry operations. The Sandilands area has been logged for decades, and it is popular amongst most for hiking, hunting, and camping. The large sand eskers and hills were left behind by the last ice age as the glaciers retreated and deposited large rocks, boulders, and vast amounts of sand. These sand ridges sometimes called the Bedford Hills or Cyprus Mountains, are the second highest point in Manitoba, behind Baldy Mountain.

Sandilands Provincial Forest is a mixed deciduous–coniferous forest comprising dry sandy ridges of trembling aspen, jack pine, and white birch mixed with wetter lowlands of black spruce, tamarack, white cedar, and black ash.

In descending order of land area, the forest is located within the Rural Municipalities of Reynolds, Piney, and Stuartburn. The nearest incorporated places are Ste. Anne and Steinbach, both lying to the west. The southernmost points in the forest lie on the border with the U.S. state of Minnesota.

Within the forest is Marchand Provincial Park.

== See also ==
- List of Manitoba provincial forests
- Forests of Canada
