= Grand Marais, Manitoba =

Grand Marais
- Location of Grand Marais in Manitoba
- Coordinates: 50.550°N 96.628°W
- Country: Canada
- Province: Manitoba
- Rural municipality: St. Clements
- Time zone: UTC−6 (CST)
  - Summer (DST): UTC−5 (CDT)

Grand Marais is a community in Manitoba, Canada within the Rural Municipality of St. Clements. It is located immediately south of Grand Beach Provincial Park on Lake Winnipeg at the base of Grand Marais Point.

The community forms part of a Statistics Canada designated place named Grand Marais/Grand Beach.

== Demographics ==
In the 2021 Census of Population conducted by Statistics Canada, Grand Marais/Grand Beach had a population of 601 living in 304 of its 1,180 total private dwellings, a change of 95.8% from its 2016 population of 307. With a land area of 2.56 km^{2} (0.99 sq mi), it had a population density of 234.8/km^{2} (608.0/sq mi) in 2021.

== See also ==
- List of designated places in Manitoba
