= Badger, Manitoba =

Human settlement in Manitoba, Canada

Coordinates: 49°11′25″N 95°57′33″W

Badger, Manitoba is a hamlet in the Rural Municipality of Piney, Manitoba province of Canada. The community, whose elevation is 377 m (1,236 ft), lies southwest of Whitemouth Lake, and is surrounded by the Sandilands Provincial Forest.

It is known for its blueberry crop. Settlers also trapped and hunted to supplement their income.

== History ==
Badger began in 1900 as a railway station along the Manitoba and Southern Railway. In its early days, the community had three grocery stores, a post office (opened in 1904; closed in 1961), a dance hall, school house, section and station houses.

The community was known to the Canadian National Railway as Summit for their railway point on section 12-3-11E; the school district, called Evergreen, was located on 6-3-12E.
