= Grand Beach Provincial Park =

Provincial park in Manitoba, Canada

- IUCN category II (national park)
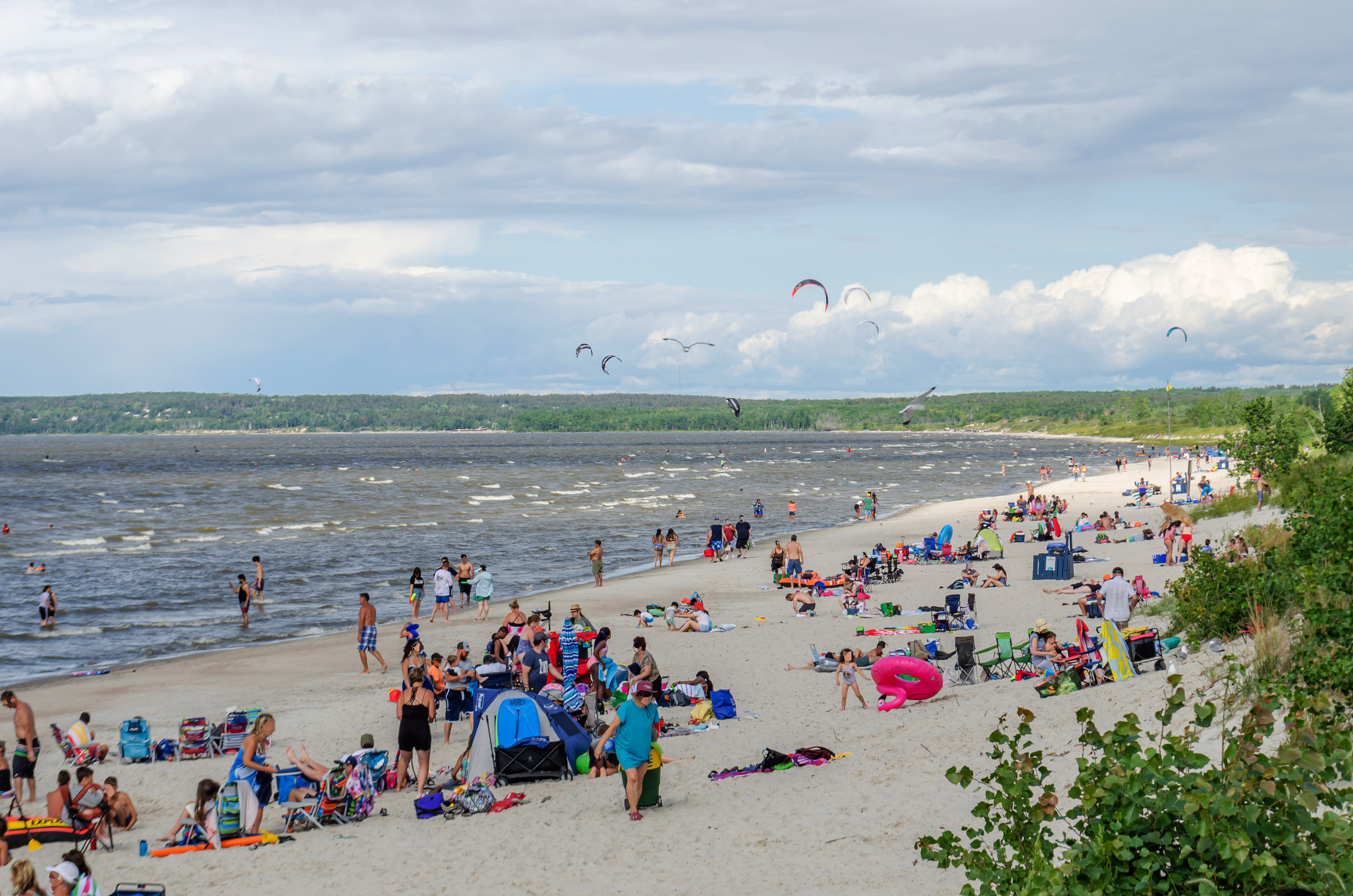
- Grand Beach and Provincial Park on the shores of Lake Winnipeg in August 2020

- Location within Manitoba
- Location: Manitoba, Canada
- Nearest town: Powerview-Pine Falls, Manitoba
- Coordinates: 50°34′5″N 96°33′42″W
- Area: 24.9 km^{2} (9.6 sq mi)
- Established: 1961
- Governing body: Government of Manitoba

Grand Beach Provincial Park

Grand Beach Provincial Park is a provincial park in Manitoba, Canada, noted for its large white sand dunes and ancient beaches from the end of the last ice age. It is located on the eastern shore of Lake Winnipeg, one of the largest freshwater lakes in the world, and the largest lake completely within the borders of southern Canada.

The park, which is 24.9 square kilometres (9.6 sq mi) in size, is approximately an hour and twenty minutes drive from Winnipeg and is located in the westernmost part of the Rural Municipality of Alexander and the northernmost part of the Rural Municipality of St. Clements. The Government of Manitoba designated the area a provincial park in 1961.

The park is considered a Class II protected area under the IUCN protected area management categories. It is a sanctuary for the piping plover, an endangered species of bird that nests on the beach. Bald eagles, bears, sea gulls, terns, and pelicans are among the wide variety of species that inhabit the area.

== Grand Beach ==
Grand Beach is one of a series of beaches on the east shore of Lake Winnipeg. Its fine white sand has made it an attractive summer destination since the early years of the twentieth century when the Canadian Northern Railway established an excursion line to the area. The resort developed by the railway included many amenities including a dance hall, piers and a carousel. Most of the visitors were Winnipeg residents travelling by train and returning to the city the same day. The increase in car ownership and concurrent road improvement after the end of World War II resulted in a declining number of customers for the excursion trains. The railway did not rebuild the dance hall when it burnt down in 1950 and in 1963, the tracks were removed. Today, beachgoers still flock to Grand Beach, arriving by car along Manitoba Highway 59.

== Activities ==
The park attracts thousands of visitors a year and is a very popular tourist destination. Available activities include excellent bird watching, cycling and hiking trails, boating, fishing, kiteboarding, and berry picking (saskatoons, chokecherries, and blueberries). In the winter, the park offers snowmobiling and cross-country skiing. There are numerous tourist attractions, which include food and merchandise vendors, recreation facilities, bike, hiking, and ski trails, a fishing dock, a boardwalk, and camping facilities. Forty-eight seasonal camp sites, all of which have electricity, are located in the park. There are 306 casual campsites, of which about half offer electricity.

A park pass is required for vehicle entry to the park. Passes are available from regional businesses or at the park gate. There are also a few "free park entry weekends" per year, including Family Fishing Weekend, Canada Parks Day, and the September Long Weekend.

== Gallery ==
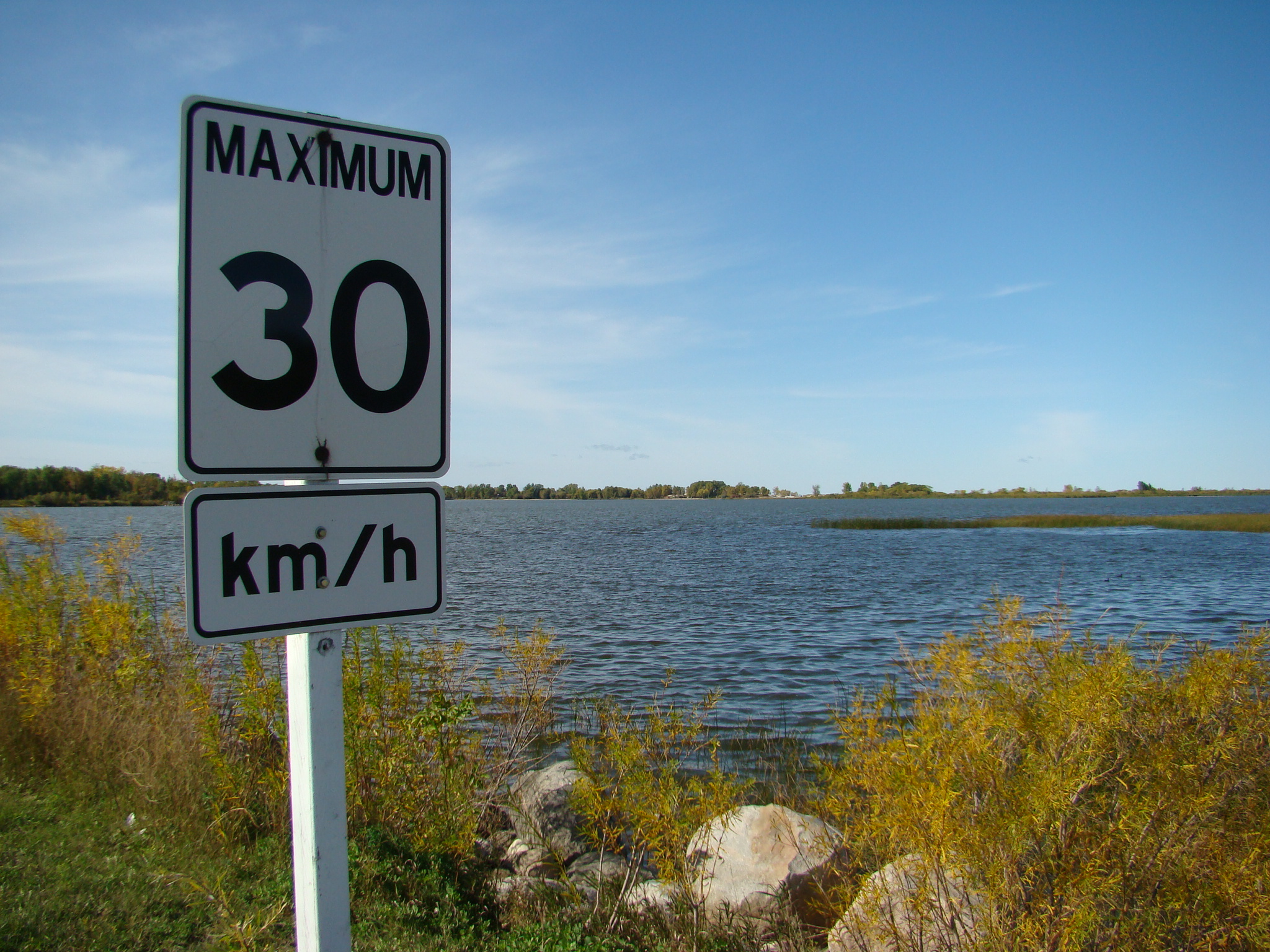

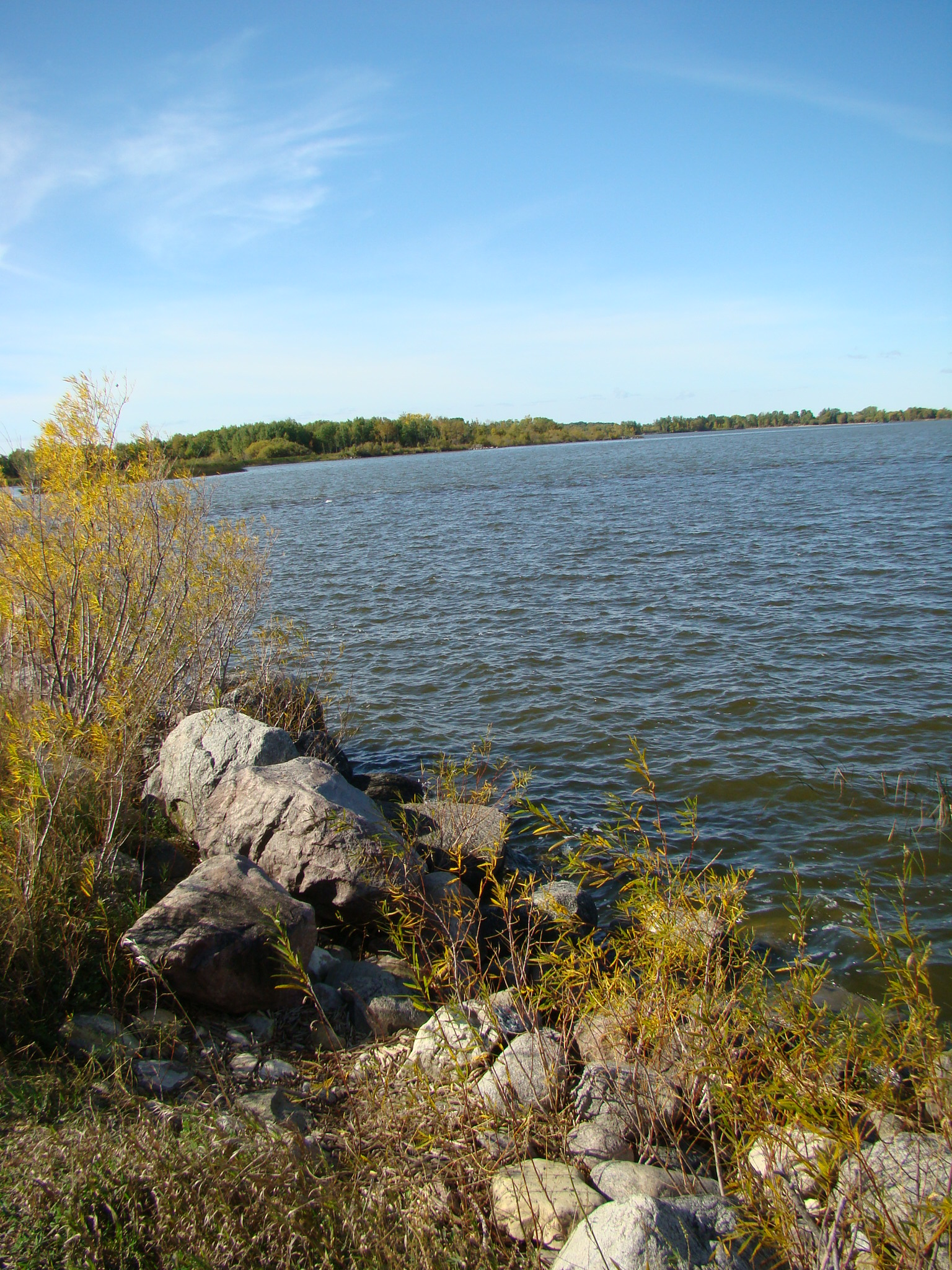

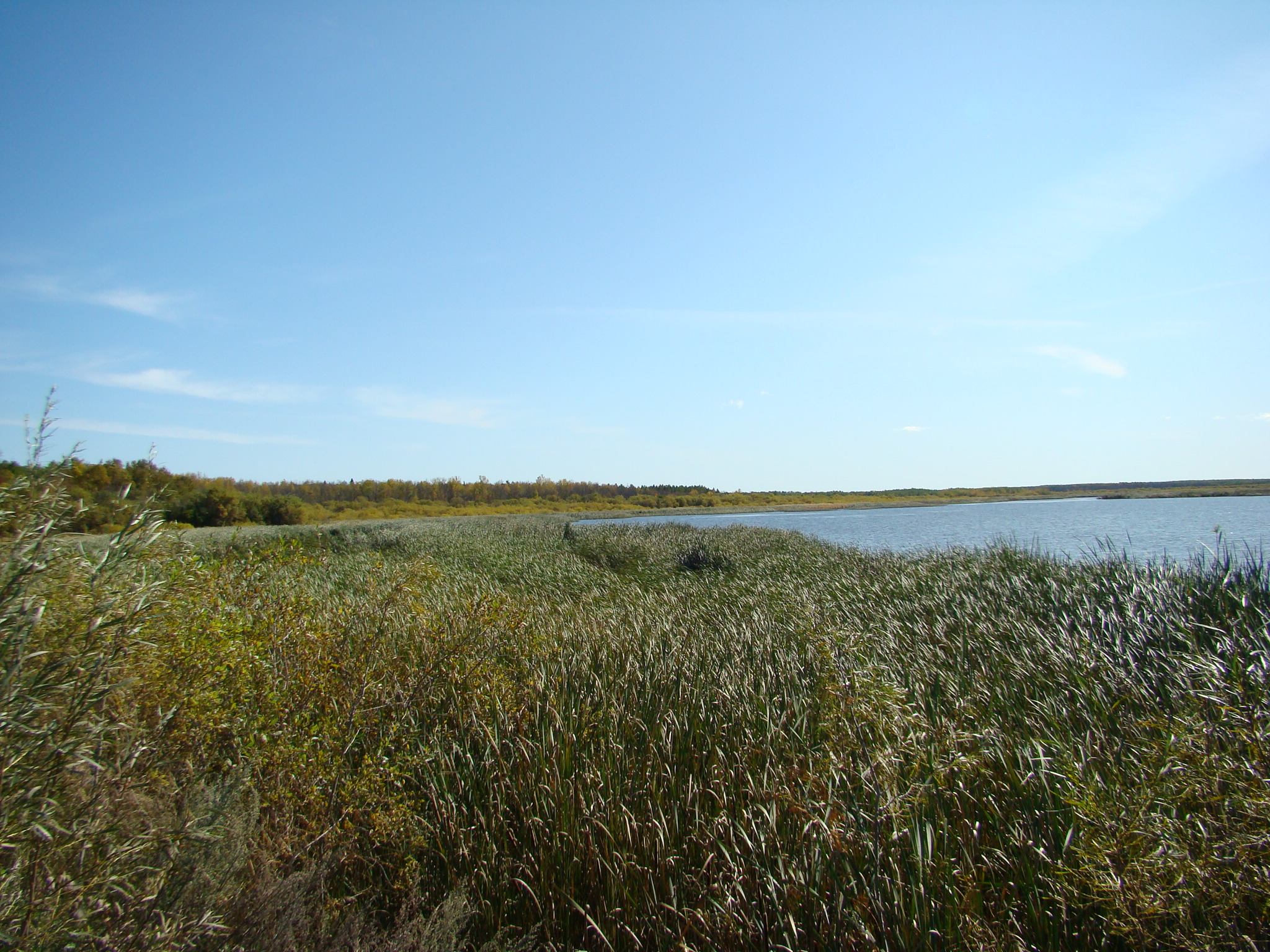

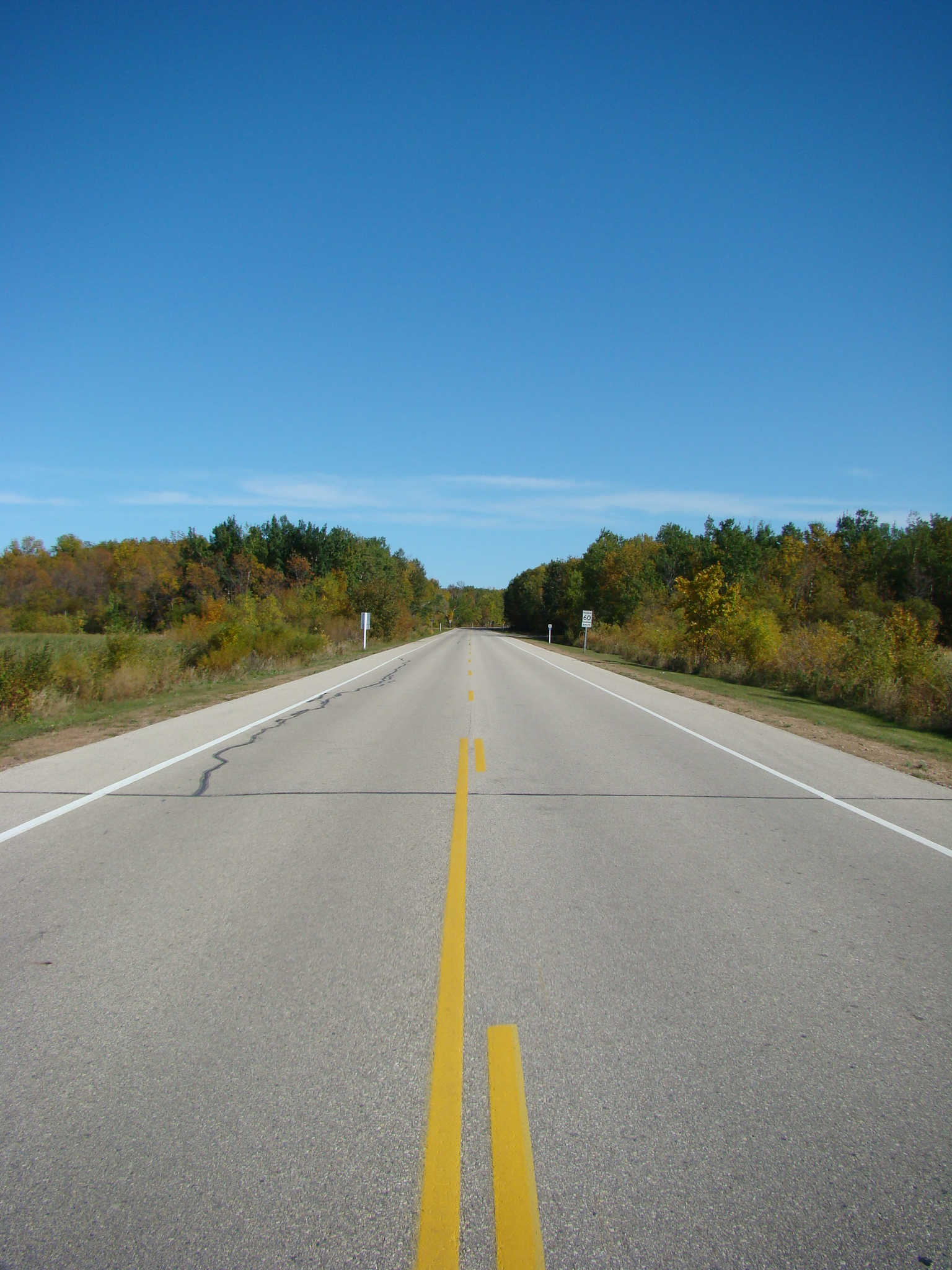

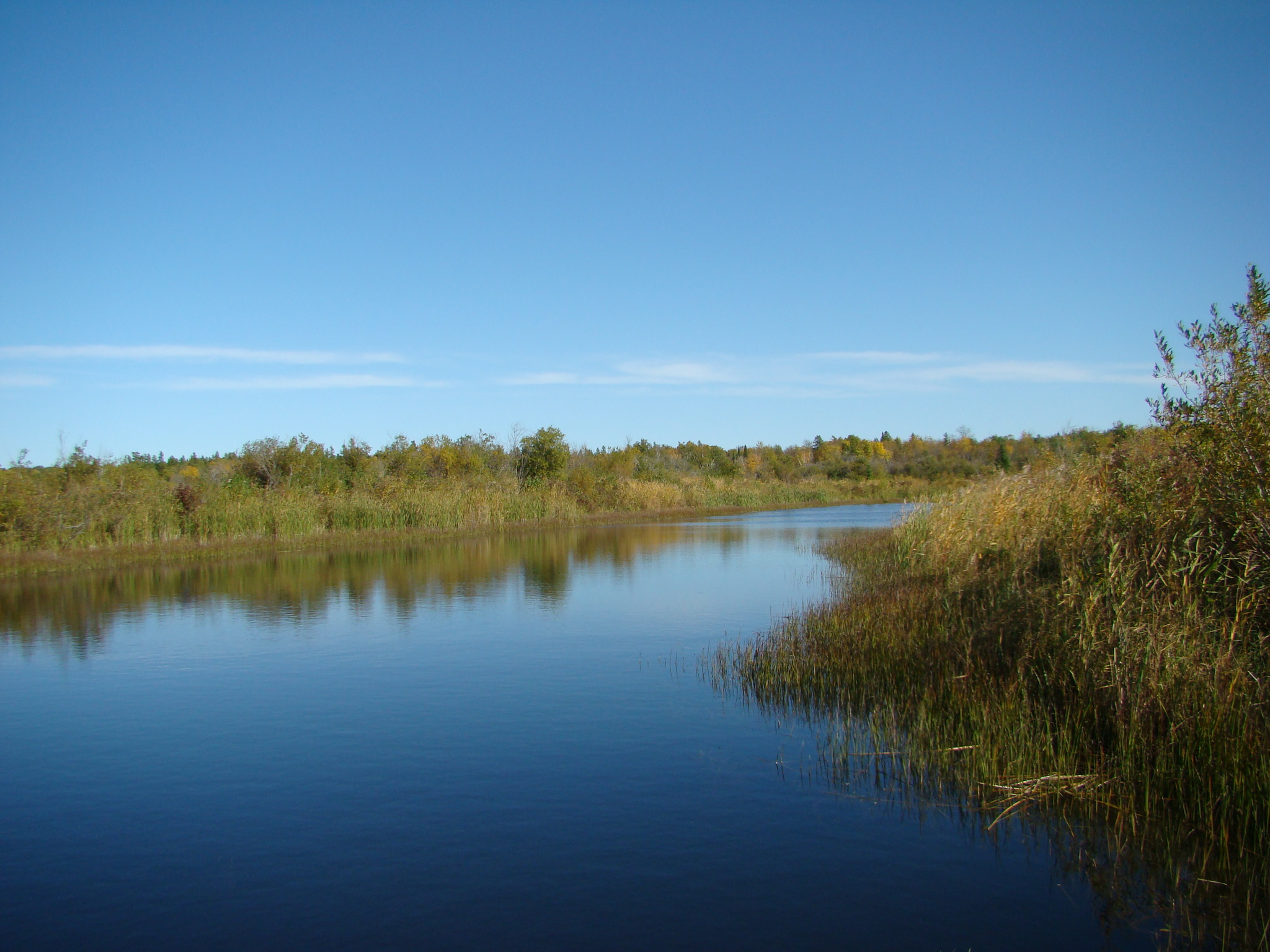

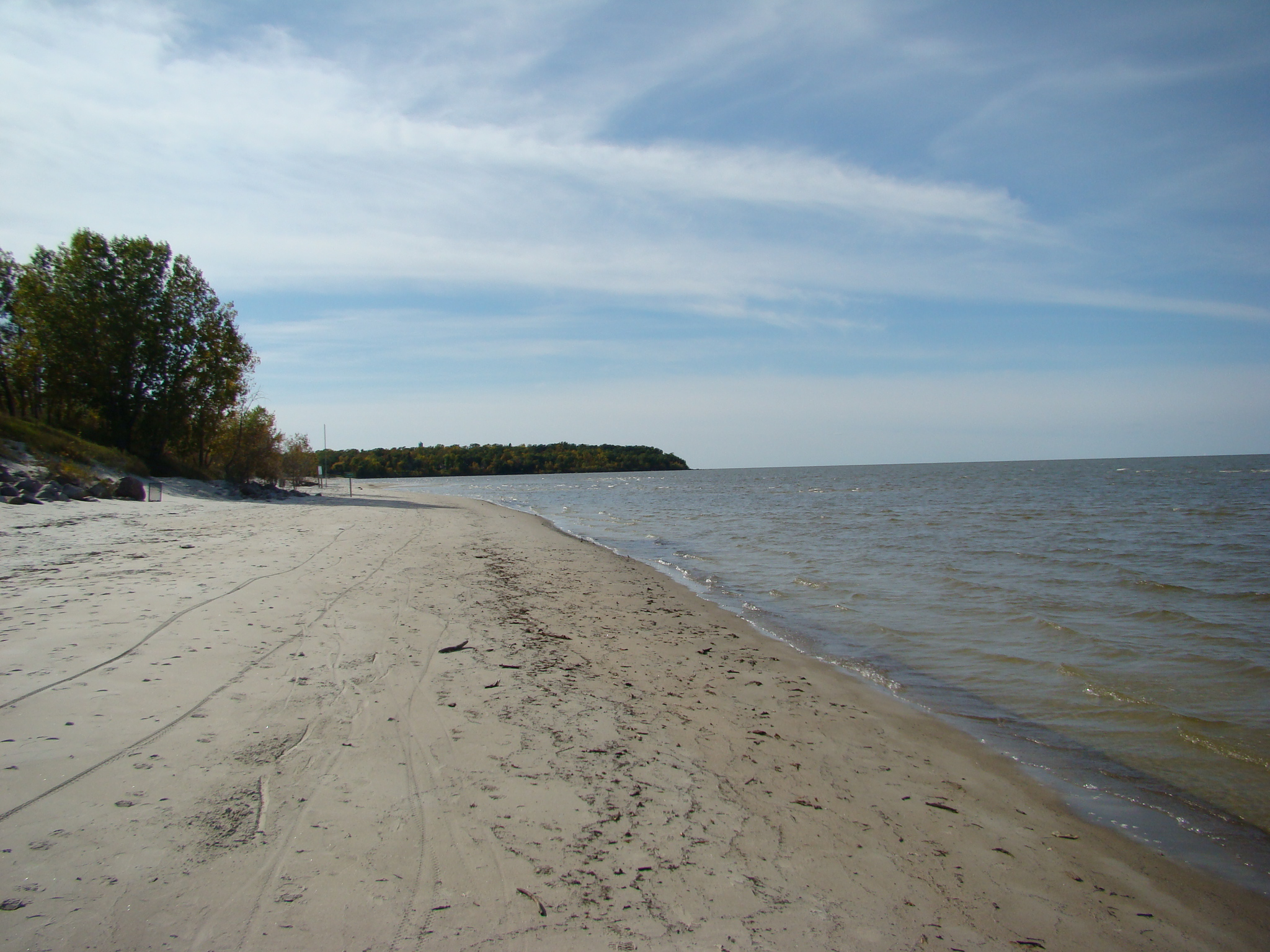

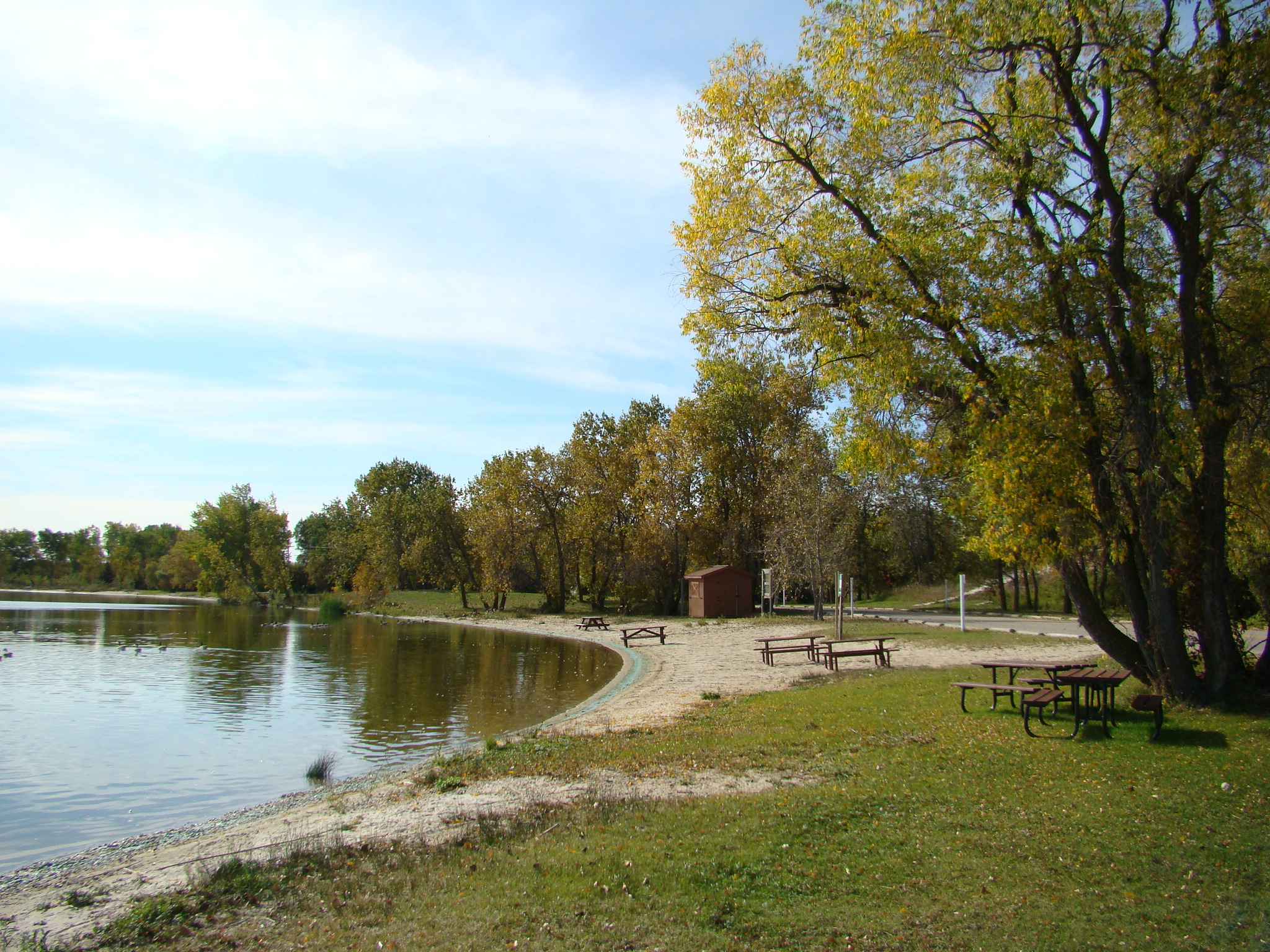

== See also ==
- List of protected areas of Manitoba
- Grand Marais, Manitoba
