= Rural Municipality of Stuartburn =

Rural municipality in Manitoba, Canada

Stuartburn
- Rural municipality
- Rural Municipality of Stuartburn
- Location of the RM of Stuartburn in Manitoba
- Coordinates: 49.13306°N 96.51583°W
- Country: Canada
- Province: Manitoba
- Region: Eastman
- First settled: August 1896
- First incorporated: 15 January 1902
- Incorporated as an LGD: 1 January 1945
- Incorporated as a rural municipality: 1 January 1997

Government
  - Reeve: David Kiansky

Area
  - Land: 1,161.45 km^{2} (448.44 sq mi)

Population (2021)
  - Total: 1,731
  - Density: 1.4/km^{2} (3.6/sq mi)
- Website: rmofstuartburn.com

Stuartburn is a rural municipality (RM) located in the Eastman Region of Manitoba, Canada. It had a population of 1,629 according to the Canada 2006 Census.

The municipality is named after the Ukrainian-Canadian village of Stuartburn within the RM, supposedly named for an early settler called William H. Stuart.

== History ==
The first settlers to the area of current-day Stuartburn arrived in August 1896 from Ukraine. This first settlement consisted of 26 families, followed by other groups from Ukraine in subsequent months. The settlement expanded eastward and northward, and by the end of 1900, the number of settlers reached approximately 3,000. The first Ukrainian Orthodox Church was built in the vicinity of Gardenton in 1897; and the first Ukrainian Catholic Church began construction in 1899 and completed in 1902 in the vicinity of Stuartburn.

The Rural Municipality of Stuartburn was organized on 15 January 1902, disorganized in 1928, became the Local Government District of Stuartburn on 1 January 1945, and then was reorganized as the Rural Municipality of Stuartburn on 1 January 1997.

== Geography ==
According to Statistics Canada, the RM has an area of 1,161.65 km^{2} (448.52 sq mi). There are no separately incorporated cities, towns, or villages within the municipality. A small portion of Sandilands Provincial Forest lies in its northeast corner. The Manitoba Tall Grass Prairie Preserve and Tallgrass Aspen Parkland are also found within the municipality.

Stuartburn is one of three municipalities in Manitoba bordering the U.S. state of Minnesota; however, none of the international border crossings between Manitoba and Minnesota are located in Stuartburn.

=== Communities ===
Stuartburn includes the following communities:

- Arbakka
- Caliento
- Gardenton
- Rofton
- Sirko
- Stuartburn
- Sundown
- Vita
- Zhoda (part)

== Demographics ==
In the 2021 Census of Population conducted by Statistics Canada, Stuartburn had a population of 1,731 living in 619 of its 776 total private dwellings, a change of 5% from its 2016 population of 1,648. With a land area of 1,161.45 km^{2} (448.44 sq mi), it had a population density of 1.5/km^{2} (3.9/sq mi) in 2021.
