= Rural Municipality of St. Clements =

Rural municipality in Manitoba, Canada

St. Clements
- Rural municipality
- Rural Municipality of St. Clements
- Location of the RM of St. Clements in Manitoba
- Coordinates: 50°16′08″N 96°40′27″W
- Country: Canada
- Province: Manitoba
- Regions: Interlake; Winnipeg Metro
- Incorporated: December 22, 1883; 142 years ago
- Named for: Parish of St. Clements
- Seat: East Selkirk

Government
  - Mayor: Debbie Fiebelkorn

Area
  - Land: 711.17 km^{2} (274.58 sq mi)
- Elevation: 227 m (745 ft)

Population (2021)
  - Total: 11,586
  - Density: 16.291/km^{2} (42.195/sq mi)
- Time zone: UTC−6 (CST)
  - Summer (DST): UTC−5 (CDT)
- Area codes: 204, 431
- Website: rmofstclements.com

St. Clements is a rural municipality (RM) in Manitoba, Canada. It is located to the north-east of Winnipeg, stretching from East St. Paul and Birds Hill Provincial Park in the south to Lake Winnipeg and Grand Beach Provincial Park to the north. The Red River demarcates the western boundary of the municipality. St. Clements contains the communities of East Selkirk, and Lockport east of the Red River. It almost completely surrounds the Brokenhead 4 Indian reserve, with the exception of a small lakefront on Lake Winnipeg.

Its population at the 2016 census was 10,876. The city of Selkirk borders it to the west, across the Red River of the North.

== Communities ==
Communities located within St. Clements include:

- Beaconia
- East Selkirk
- Grand Marais
- Libau
- Lockport (part)
- Scanterbury
- Thalberg

== Demographics ==
Historical population
Year	Pop.	±%
1891	1,849	—
1981	6,294	+240.4%
1986	6,922	+10.0%
1996	8,516	+23.0%
2001	9,115	+7.0%
2006	9,706	+6.5%
2011	10,505	+8.2%
2016	10,876	+3.5%
2021	11,586	+6.5%
Sources: Department of Agriculture

In the 2021 Census of Population conducted by Statistics Canada, St. Clements had a population of 11,586 living in 4,604 of its 5,720 total private dwellings, a change of 6.5% from its 2016 population of 10,876. With a land area of 711.17 km^{2} (274.58 sq mi), it had a population density of 16.3/km^{2} (42.2/sq mi) in 2021.

Panethnic groups in the Rural Municipality of St. Clements (2001−2021)
Panethnic group	2021		2016		2011		2006		2001	
Panethnic group	Pop.	%	Pop.	%	Pop.	%	Pop.	%	Pop.	%
European (Note: Statistic includes all persons that did not make up part of a visible minority or an indigenous identity.)	9,145	80.18%	8,945	83.33%	9,150	88.07%	8,695	89.64%	8,255	90.57%
Indigenous	1,940	17.01%	1,650	15.37%	1,115	10.73%	910	9.38%	760	8.34%
Southeast Asian (Note: Statistic includes total responses of "Filipino" and "Southeast Asian" under visible minority section on census.)	100	0.88%	65	0.61%	70	0.67%	40	0.41%	25	0.27%
Latin American	50	0.44%	20	0.19%	0	0%	35	0.36%	30	0.33%
South Asian	40	0.35%	0	0%	0	0%	10	0.1%	20	0.22%
East Asian (Note: Statistic includes total responses of "Chinese", "Korean", and "Japanese" under visible minority section on census.)	35	0.31%	20	0.19%	0	0%	0	0%	0	0%
Middle Eastern (Note: Statistic includes total responses of "West Asian" and "Arab" under visible minority section on census.)	35	0.31%	10	0.09%	0	0%	0	0%	0	0%
African	50	0.44%	30	0.28%	35	0.34%	10	0.1%	15	0.16%
Other/multiracial (Note: Statistic includes total responses of "Visible minority, n.i.e." and "Multiple visible minorities" under visible minority section on census.)	0	0%	10	0.09%	0	0%	10	0.1%	0	0%
Total responses	11,405	98.44%	10,735	98.7%	10,390	98.91%	9,700	99.94%	9,115	100%
Total population	11,586	100%	10,876	100%	10,505	100%	9,706	100%	9,115	100%
Note: Totals greater than 100% due to multiple origin responses

== Notable people ==
- Ernie Anderson (1898–1977), ice hockey player
