= Piney, Manitoba =

Coordinates: 49°04′31″N 95°58′42″W

Location of Piney in Manitoba

Piney is a community in southeastern Manitoba, Canada, in the Rural Municipality of Piney. It is approximately 130 kilometers from Winnipeg and within five kilometres of the Canada–US border.

It was served by the Piney Pinecreek Border Airport, unusual in that its runway lied across the international border, along the Pinecreek–Piney Border Crossing.

== Climate ==
Climate data for Piney
Month	Jan	Feb	Mar	Apr	May	Jun	Jul	Aug	Sep	Oct	Nov	Dec	Year
Record high °C (°F)	7 (45)	11.5 (52.7)	18 (64)	31 (88)	33 (91)	35 (95)	38 (100)	36.5 (97.7)	35 (95)	29 (84)	19 (66)	9.5 (49.1)	38 (100)
Mean daily maximum °C (°F)	−10.7 (12.7)	−6.2 (20.8)	−0.9 (30.4)	10.9 (51.6)	18.9 (66.0)	22.8 (73.0)	25.3 (77.5)	24.9 (76.8)	18.5 (65.3)	10.7 (51.3)	−0.3 (31.5)	−8.6 (16.5)	8.9 (48.0)
Daily mean °C (°F)	−16.4 (2.5)	−12 (10)	−4.6 (23.7)	4.3 (39.7)	11.7 (53.1)	16.3 (61.3)	18.8 (65.8)	18 (64)	12.1 (53.8)	5.1 (41.2)	−4.4 (24.1)	−13.5 (7.7)	3 (37)
Mean daily minimum °C (°F)	−22.1 (−7.8)	−17.6 (0.3)	−10 (14)	−2.3 (27.9)	4.3 (39.7)	9.9 (49.8)	12.3 (54.1)	11 (52)	5.6 (42.1)	−0.4 (31.3)	−8.6 (16.5)	−18.4 (−1.1)	−3 (27)
Record low °C (°F)	−46 (−51)	−48.5 (−55.3)	−38.5 (−37.3)	−22 (−8)	−9 (16)	−3 (27)	1.5 (34.7)	−3 (27)	−9 (16)	−20 (−4)	−40.5 (−40.9)	−43.5 (−46.3)	−48.5 (−55.3)
Average precipitation mm (inches)	25.2 (0.99)	20.6 (0.81)	23.1 (0.91)	29.1 (1.15)	64.8 (2.55)	105.2 (4.14)	89 (3.5)	76.9 (3.03)	62.3 (2.45)	51.6 (2.03)	31.1 (1.22)	24.9 (0.98)	603.8 (23.77)
Source: Environment Canada

== Gallery ==
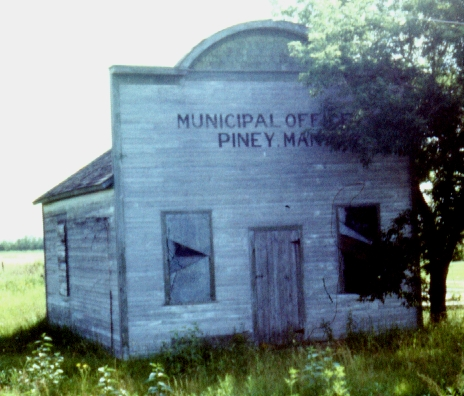
Piney Municipal Office

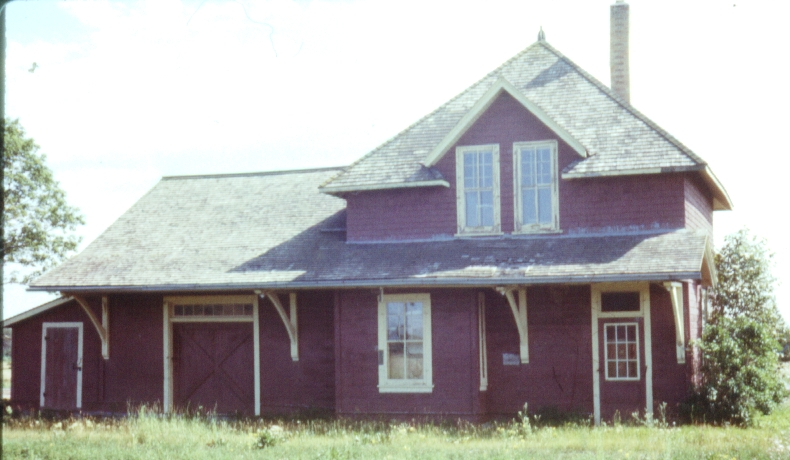
Piney CN station, 1979

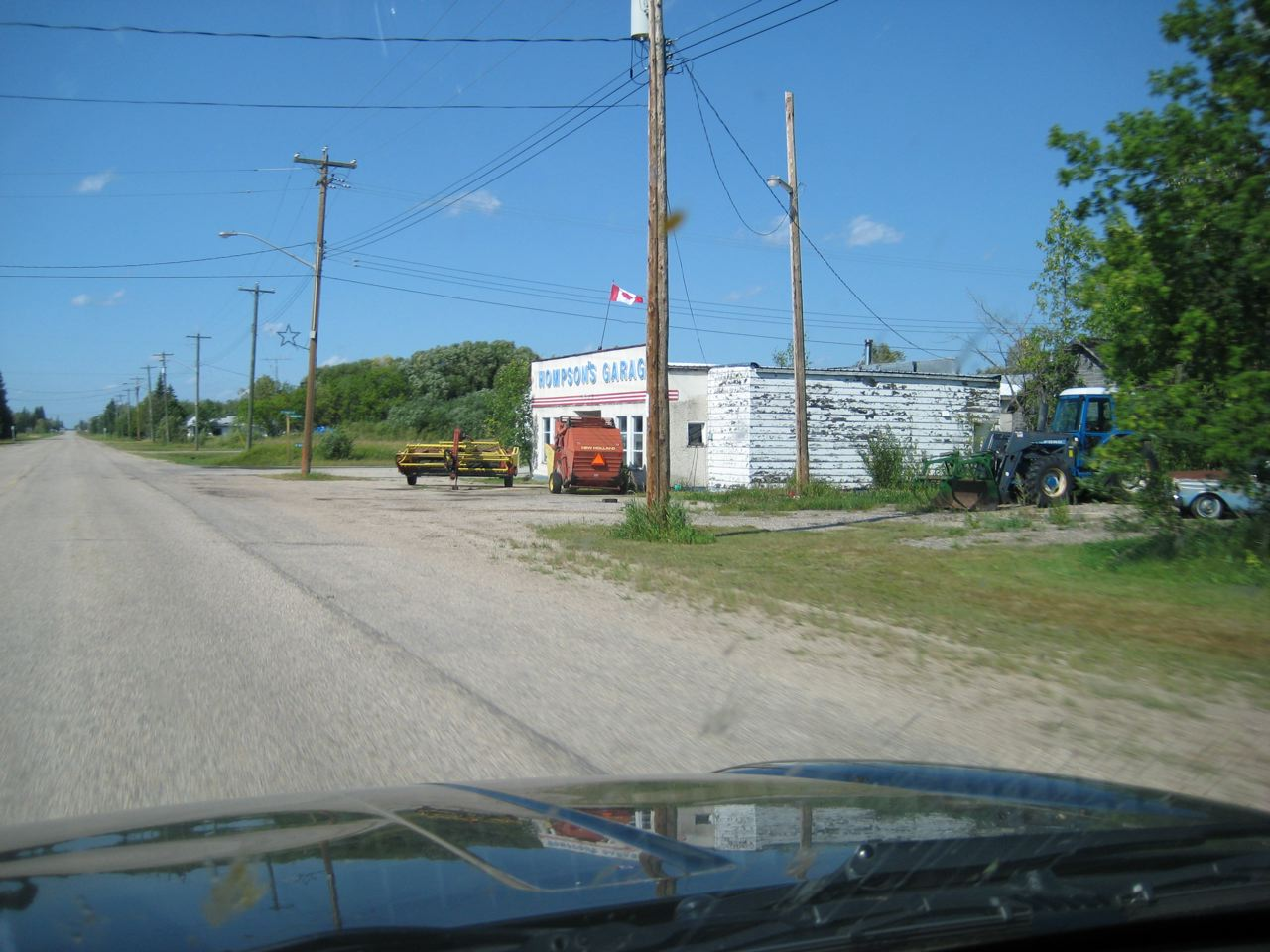
View of Piney looking north, 2007

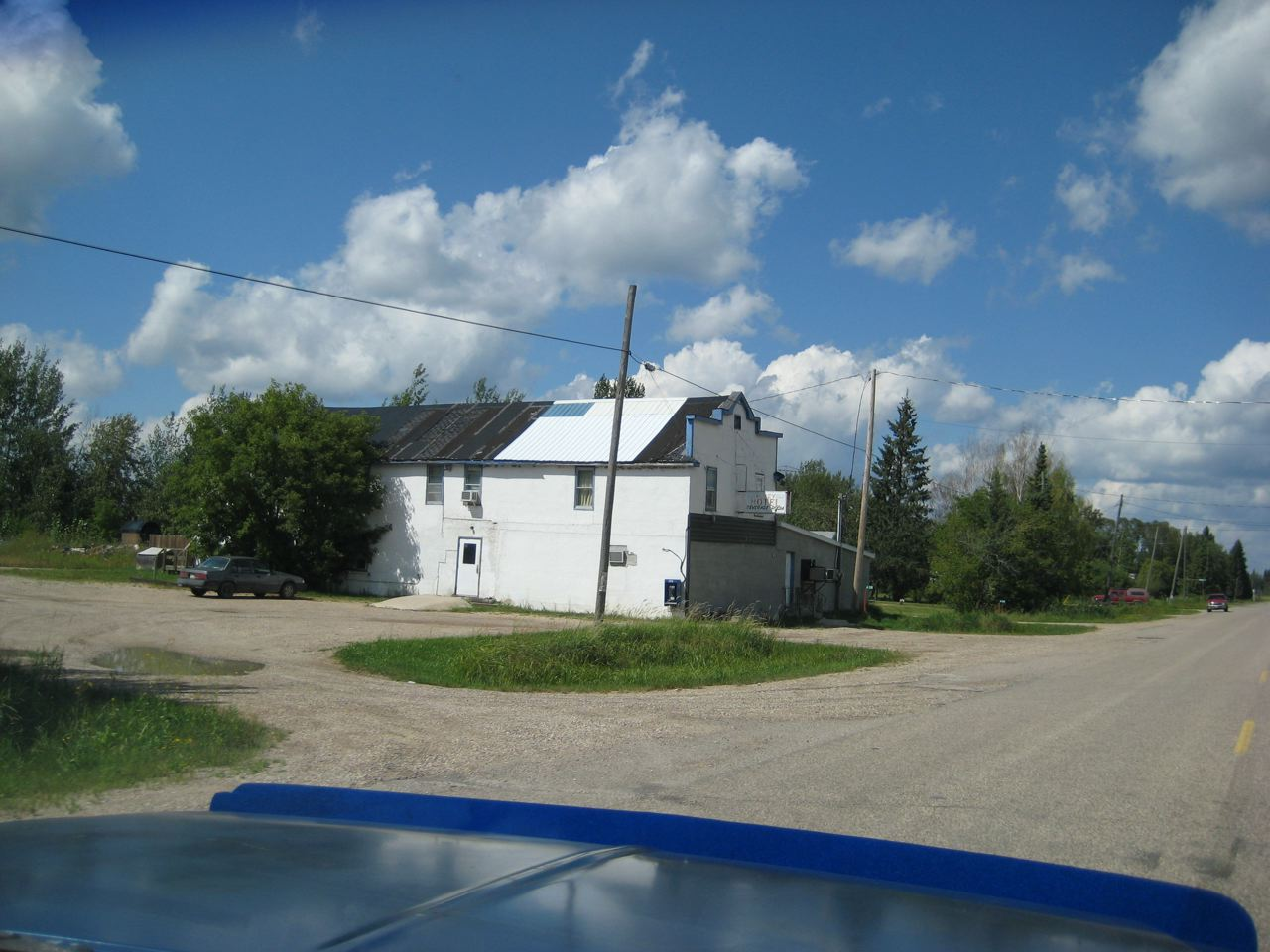
Piney Hotel, 2007

== See also ==
- Pinecreek–Piney Border Crossing
