= Sprague, Manitoba =

Community in RM Piney, Manitoba

Coordinates: 49°02′07″N 95°38′21″W

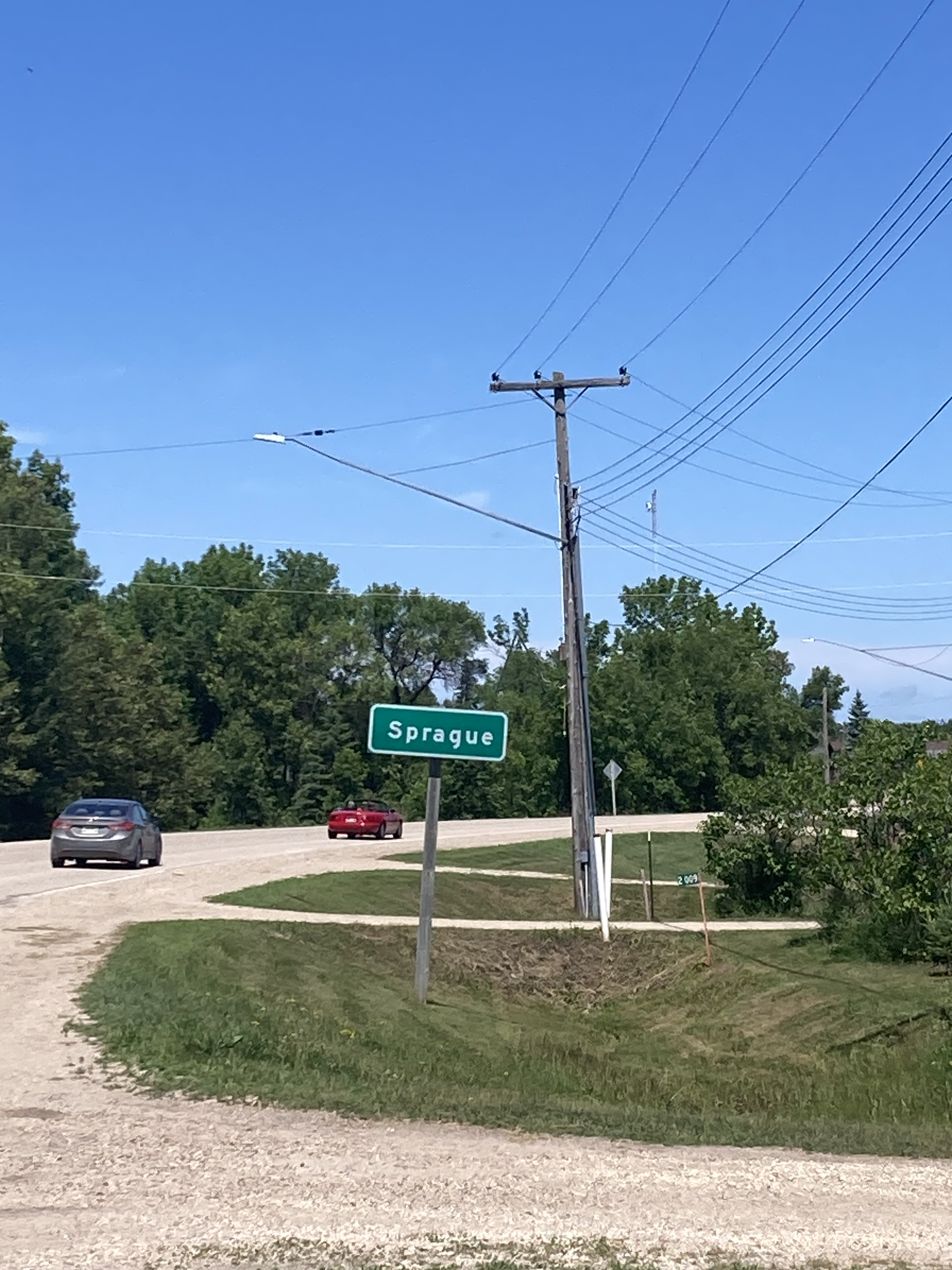
- Sprague from the southern entrance
- Interactive map of Sprague, Manitoba
- Founder: Daniel E. Sprague
- Named for: Daniel E. Sprague

Population
  - Total: 151

Sprague is a community within the Rural Municipality of Piney in the Canadian province of Manitoba. The community is located in the extreme southeast corner of the province near the Canada–United States border (Warroad–Sprague Border Crossing), at the junction of Manitoba Highway 12 and Provincial Road 308. It also serves as the pathway to reach the exclave of Angle Inlet, Minnesota by road, as well as Lake of the Woods.

The nearest major centres include Warroad and Thief River Falls, Minnesota; Fort Frances, Ontario; and Steinbach, Manitoba.

Sprague has a population of 151.

== History ==
Sprague was named for Daniel E. Sprague, a prominent Winnipeg lumber merchant. Originally founded around 1885 for the purpose of serving the new lumber company, the Sprague River was used to float logs up to Winnipeg, but now is utilized for its hunting, fishing, and recreational spaces.

The Sprague and District Historical Museum was opened in June 2006, including a monument which was created in 2012 in the honor of those who served in major wars and peacekeeping missions.

== Climate ==
Sprague has a humid continental climate (Köppen Dfb) with strong seasonal swings. Although winters are very cold, snowfall is normally not excessive compared to areas further east. Summer afternoons are warm and variable with cool nights.

Climate data for Sprague
Month	Jan	Feb	Mar	Apr	May	Jun	Jul	Aug	Sep	Oct	Nov	Dec	Year
Record high °C (°F)	11.1 (52.0)	12.8 (55.0)	23.9 (75.0)	33.3 (91.9)	35.0 (95.0)	36.7 (98.1)	38.9 (102.0)	36.0 (96.8)	35.0 (95.0)	30.0 (86.0)	22.2 (72.0)	9.4 (48.9)	38.9 (102.0)
Mean daily maximum °C (°F)	−10.4 (13.3)	−6.3 (20.7)	0.6 (33.1)	10.3 (50.5)	18.7 (65.7)	23.0 (73.4)	25.1 (77.2)	24.8 (76.6)	18.2 (64.8)	10.5 (50.9)	−1.1 (30.0)	−8.5 (16.7)	8.7 (47.7)
Daily mean °C (°F)	−16.3 (2.7)	−12.3 (9.9)	−5.1 (22.8)	3.7 (38.7)	11.4 (52.5)	16.4 (61.5)	18.7 (65.7)	17.9 (64.2)	11.9 (53.4)	5.0 (41.0)	−5.4 (22.3)	−13.5 (7.7)	2.7 (36.9)
Mean daily minimum °C (°F)	−22.1 (−7.8)	−18.2 (−0.8)	−10.8 (12.6)	−2.9 (26.8)	4.1 (39.4)	9.8 (49.6)	12.2 (54.0)	10.9 (51.6)	5.6 (42.1)	−0.6 (30.9)	−9.8 (14.4)	−18.5 (−1.3)	−3.4 (26.0)
Record low °C (°F)	−48.3 (−54.9)	−47.2 (−53.0)	−45.6 (−50.1)	−30 (−22)	−13.3 (8.1)	−6.7 (19.9)	−1.7 (28.9)	−5.6 (21.9)	−11.1 (12.0)	−27.2 (−17.0)	−40 (−40)	−46.7 (−52.1)	−48.3 (−54.9)
Average precipitation mm (inches)	26.6 (1.05)	21.3 (0.84)	23.5 (0.93)	31.3 (1.23)	69.1 (2.72)	109.4 (4.31)	104.5 (4.11)	73.0 (2.87)	70.7 (2.78)	45.0 (1.77)	37.1 (1.46)	26.1 (1.03)	637.6 (25.1)
Source: Environment Canada

== Education ==
The Ross L. Gray School, which was named after a local school board official, was founded in February 1902. It consolidated other schools over time, including school districts from Middlebro, Golden Branch, and South Junction. Its most recent principal was Danielle Charrette.

== See also ==
- Northwest Angle
- Warroad–Sprague Border Crossing
