= Eastman Region =

Coordinates: 49°53′N 96°15′W

- Region
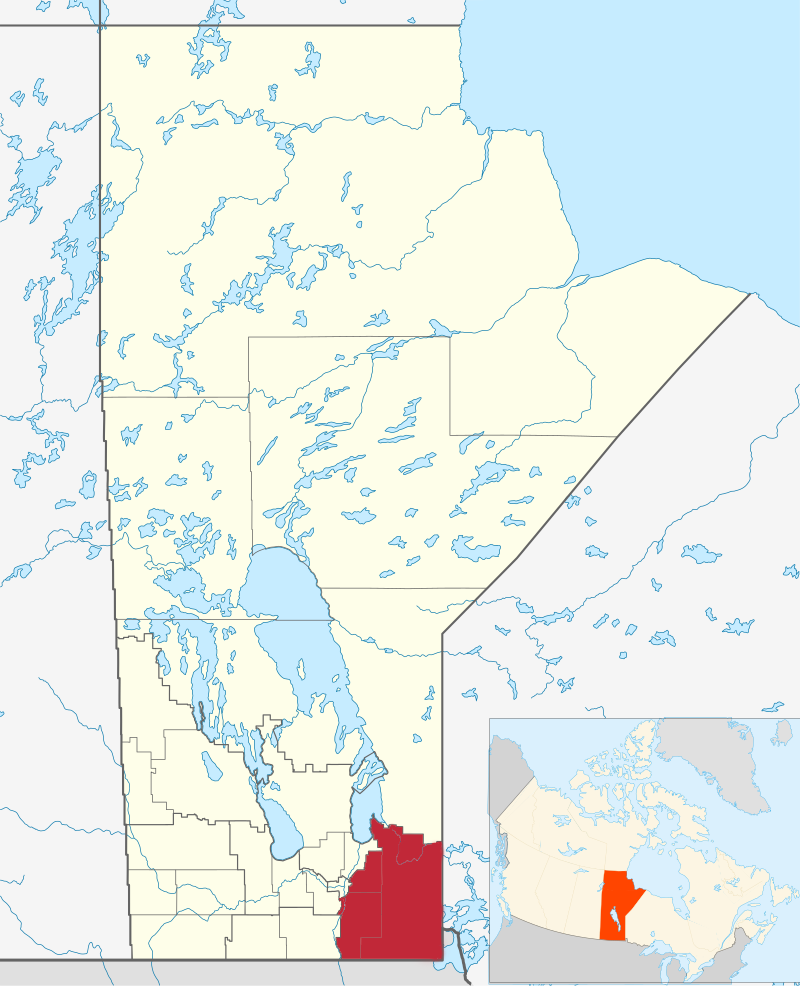
- Map of the Eastman Region of Manitoba.
- Country: Canada
- Province: Manitoba

Area
  - Total: 21,074.16 km^{2} (8,136.78 sq mi)

Population (2021)
  - Total: 128,855
  - Density: 6.11436/km^{2} (15.8361/sq mi)

Eastern Manitoba, or the Eastman Region (French: Région de Eastman), is an informal geographic region of the Canadian province of Manitoba. It is bounded on the north by the Winnipeg River and Lake Winnipeg, on the east by the Manitoba-Ontario border, on the south by the Canada–US border, and on the west by the Red River. With a population of 128,855 as of the 2021 Canadian census, the Eastman Region is the second most populous region outside of the Winnipeg Metropolitan Region.

The city of Steinbach is the largest population centre in the region. The Trans-Canada Highway runs through the middle of the Eastman Region.

== Major communities ==
| Name of Population Centre | Population (2021) | Status |
|---|---|---|
| Beausejour | 3,308 | Town |
| Blumenort | 1,738 | LUD |
| Lac du Bonnet | 1,064 | Town |
| Lorette | 3,208 | LUD |
| Mitchell | 3,136 | LUD |
| Niverville | 5,947 | Town |
| Oakbank | 5,041 | LUD |
| Pinawa | 1,331 | Local government district |
| Powerview–Pine Falls | 1,239 | Town |
| St-Pierre-Jolys | 1,170 | Village |
| Ste. Anne | 2,891 | Town |
| Steinbach | 17,806 | City |

Unorganized areas:

- Unorganized Division 1

=== Rural municipalities ===
| Rural municipality | Unincorporated communities | Census division | Population (2021) |
|---|---|---|---|
| Alexander | Albert Beach; Belair; Bird River; Great Falls; Gull Lake; Hillside Beach; Lester Beach; Pinawa Bay; Poplar Bay; St. Georges; Silver Falls; Stead; Sunset Bay; Traverse Bay; White Mud Falls | No. 1 | 3,854 |
| Brokenhead | Brokenhead; Cloverleaf; Cromwell; Green Bay; Hazelglen; Ladywood; Lydiatt; St. Ouens; Tyndall–Garson (LUD) | No. 12 | 5,414 |
| De Salaberry | Carey; Dufrost; La Rochelle; Otterburne; St. Malo | No. 2 | 3,918 |
| Emerson-Franklin | Arnaud; Carlowrie; Dominion City; Fredensthal; Green Ridge; Ridgeville; Rosa; Roseau River; Senkiw; Tolstoi; Woodmore | No. 2 (part in No. 3) | 2,437 |
| Hanover | Barkfield; Blumenort (LUD); Bristol; Friedensfeld; Grunthal (LUD); Kleefeld; Hochstadt; Mitchell (LUD); New Bothwell; Pansy; Randolph; Sarto; Tourond | No. 2 | 17,216 |
| La Broquerie | La Broquerie; Marchand; Zhoda | No. 2 | 6,725 |
| Lac du Bonnet | Allegra; Lee River; Lowland; McArthur Falls; Milner Ridge; Seddons Corner (part); Spring Well | No. 1 | 3,563 |
| Piney: Badger; Carrick; Menisino; Middlebro; Piney; St. Labre; Sandilands; South Junction; Sprague; Vassar; Wampum; Woodridge | No. 1 | 1,843 | |
| Reynolds | Culver; East Braintree; Hadashville; Hazel; Hocter; Indigo; Larkhall; McMunn; Medika; Molson; Prawda; Rennie; Ste. Rita; Spruce Siding | No. 1 | 1,344 |
| Ritchot | Glenlea; Grande Pointe; Howden; Île-des-Chênes; St. Adolphe; Ste. Agathe | No. 2 | 7,469 |
| Springfield | Anola; Cooks Creek; Dugald; Hazelridge; Oakbank | No. 12 | 16,142 |
| Ste. Anne | Giroux; La Coulée; Richer; St. Raymond | No. 2 | 5,584 |
| Stuartburn | Arbakka; Caliento; Gardenton; Rofton; Sirko; Stuartburn; Sundown; Vita; Zhoda (part) | No. 1 | 1,731 |
| Taché | Dufresne; Landmark; Linden; Lorette; Rosewood; Ross; Ste-Geneviève | No. 2 | 11,916 |
| Victoria Beach | | No. 1 | 689 |
| Whitemouth | Darwin; Elma; River Hills; Seven Sisters Falls; Whitemouth | No. 1 | 1,630 |

=== First Nations and Indian reserves ===
- Animakee Wa Zhing 37
- Buffalo Point
- Iskatewizaagegan 39
- Roseau River Anishinabe (Roseau Rapids 2A and Roseau River 2)
- Shoal Lake 37A
- Shoal Lake 39
- Shoal Lake 39A
- Shoal Lake 40

== Points of interest ==
Other

- Great Falls Generating Station
- Underground Research Laboratory
- Whiteshell Laboratories

=== Parks, forestry, and landforms ===
- Agassiz Provincial Forest
- Atikaki Provincial Wilderness Park
- Belair Provincial Forest
- Birch Point Provincial Park
- Birds Hill Provincial Park
- Brightstone Sand Hills Provincial Forest
- Cat Hills Provincial Forest
- Elk Island Provincial Park
- Grand Beach Provincial Park
- Lee River Wildlife Management Area
- Manigotagan River Provincial Park
- Nopiming Provincial Park
- Pinawa Dam Provincial Park
- Poplar Bay Provincial Park
- Sandilands Provincial Forest
- St. Malo Provincial Park
- Wampum Provincial Forest
- Whitemouth Bog Ecological Reserve
- Whiteshell Provincial Park and Forest

Bodies of water

- Lake Winnipeg
- Lee River
- Manigotagan River
- Roseau River
- Seine River
- Winnipeg River

=== Transport ===
- Bird River (Lac du Bonnet) Airport
- Bird River Water Aerodrome
- Lac du Bonnet Airport
- Lac du Bonnet (North) Water Aerodrome
- Manitoba Highway 11
- Manitoba Provincial Road 304
- Silver Falls Airport
- Silver Falls Water Aerodrome
- Lancaster–Tolstoi Border Crossing
- Pinecreek–Piney Border Crossing
- Roseau–South Junction Border Crossing
- Warroad–Sprague Border Crossing
