= Shoal Lake =

Shoal Lake may refer to:

== Lakes ==
- Shoal Lake (Kenora District, Ontario), Canada
- Shoal Lakes (Manitoba), Canada

== Municipalities ==
- Municipality of Shoal Lake, Manitoba, Canada
  - Shoal Lake, Manitoba

== First Nations ==
- Shoal Lake First Nation, Saskatchewan, Canada
- Shoal Lake 40 First Nation, Manitoba/Ontario, Canada

== First Nations reserves ==
- Shoal Lake 31J
- Shoal Lake 34B1
- Shoal Lake 34B2
- Shoal Lake 37A
- Shoal Lake 39
- Shoal Lake 39A
- Shoal Lake 40

== See also ==
- Bull Shoals Lake
