= Unorganized Division No. 1, Manitoba =

Division No. 1, Unorganized
- Unorganized area
- Whiteshell River in Whiteshell Provincial Park

- Location within Manitoba
- Country: Canada
- Province: Manitoba
- Census division: Division No. 1

Government
  - Fed. riding: Provencher
  - Prov. riding: La Verendrye, Lac du Bonnet

Area
  - Land: 4,103.28 km^{2} (1,584.29 sq mi)

Population (2021)
  - Total: 1,380
  - Density: 0.3/km^{2} (0.78/sq mi)
- Time zone: UTC-5 (EST)
- Area codes: 204, 431, 584

Division No. 1, Unorganized, or Whiteshell Unorganized, is a Statistics Canada census subdivision of its Division No. 1, Manitoba that consists of a part of the division that is not organized into either incorporated municipalities or Indian reserves. Unlike in some other provinces, census divisions do not reflect the organization of local government in Manitoba.

It is located at the southeast corner of Manitoba, along the border of both the Province of Ontario and the U.S. State of Minnesota. The northern half of the subdivision consists of Manitoba's Whiteshell Provincial Park. The 2006 Census reported a population of 1,130, a 68.66% increase from the 670 reported in the 2001 Census. Several Indian reserves are located within the territory of the southern portion, although they are not administratively a part of it. They include the Buffalo Point First Nation, Reed River 36A First Nation, Iskatewizaagegan 39 Independent First Nation, and Shoal Lake 40 First Nation Indian reserves.

== Geography ==
According to Statistics Canada, the census subdivision has an area of 4,129.58 km^{2} (1,594.44 sq mi).

=== Adjacent rural municipalities and counties ===
- Rural Municipality of Reynolds - (west)
- Rural Municipality of Whitemouth - (west)
- Pinawa, Manitoba - (west)
- Rural Municipality of Lac du Bonnet - (west)
- Rural Municipality of Alexander - (northwest)
- Unorganized Division No. 19 - (north)
- Unorganized Kenora - (east)
- Shoal Lake 39A - (east)
- Shoal Lake 40 First Nation - (east)
- Lake of the Woods County, Minnesota - (southeast)
- Buffalo Point First Nation - (south)
- Rural Municipality of Piney - (southwest)

== Transportation ==
Whiteshell Unorganized is currently served by Via Rail at the Winnitoba station. The station building was burned down in 2016, though the station itself is active.

Preceding station	Via Rail	Following station
Ophir toward Vancouver	The Canadian	Rice Lake toward Toronto
Former services
Preceding station	Canadian National Railway	Following station
Ophir toward Vancouver	Main Line	Rice Lake toward Montreal
