= Agency 30 =

- Indian reserve
- Agency Indian Reserve No. 30
- Location within Ontario
- Coordinates: 49°22′N 94°37′W
- Country: Canada
- Province: Ontario
- District: Kenora
- First Nations: Animakee Wa Zhing 37, Big Grassy, Buffalo Point, Iskatewizaagegan 39, Naongashiing, Naotkamegwanning, Niisaachewan, Northwest Angle 33, Obashkaandagaang Bay, Onigaming, Shoal Lake 40, Wabaseemoong & Wauzhushk Onigum

Area
  - Land: 3.79 km^{2} (1.46 sq mi)

Agency 30 is a First Nations reserve on the Aulneau Peninsula of Lake of the Woods in northwestern Ontario. It is shared by 13 First Nations:

- Animakee Wa Zhing 37 First Nation
- Big Grassy First Nation
- Buffalo Point First Nation
- Iskatewizaagegan 39 Independent First Nation
- Anishnaabeg of Naongashiing
- Naotkamegwanning First Nation
- Niisaachewan Anishinaabe Nation
- Northwest Angle 33 First Nation
- Obashkaandagaang Bay First Nation
- Ojibways of Onigaming First Nation
- Shoal Lake 40 First Nation
- Wabaseemoong Independent Nations and
- Anishinabe of Wauzhushk Onigum
