= Rat Portage 38A =

- Indian reserve
- Rat Portage Indian Reserve No. 38A
- Location within Ontario
- Coordinates: 49°42′N 94°36′W
- Country: Canada
- Province: Ontario
- District: Kenora
- First Nation: Obashkaandagaang Bay

Area
  - Land: 29.84 km^{2} (11.52 sq mi)

Population (2011)
  - Total: 362
  - Density: 12.1/km^{2} (31/sq mi)

Rat Portage 38A is a First Nations reserve on Lake of the Woods in northwestern Ontario. It is one of two reserves of the Obashkaandagaang Bay First Nation.
