= Thomas Deacon (disambiguation) =

Thomas Deacon (1697–1753) was a liturgical scholar and physician.

Thomas Deacon may also refer to:

- Thomas Deacon (politician) (1832–1911), Canadian politician
- Thomas Russ Deacon (1865–1955), Canadian politician
- Tom Deacon (rugby union) (1868–1921), Wales international rugby player
- Tom Deacon (comedian) (born 1986), English comedian and broadcaster
