= Shoal Lake (Ontario) =

Shoal Lake is the name of several lakes in Ontario:

- Shoal Lake (Kenora District, Ontario)
- Shoal Lake (Rainy River District, Ontario)
- Shoal Lake (Nipissing District, Ontario)
- Shoal Lake (Parry Sound District, Ontario)
- Shoal Lake (Thunder Bay District, Ontario)
- Shoal Lake (Algoma District, Ontario)

== See also ==
- Shoal Lake (disambiguation)
