= Greater Winnipeg Water District Aqueduct =

- Coordinates: 49°37′21″N 95°11′44″W
- Locale: Shoal Lake 40 First Nation
- Begins: Shoal Lake, Ontario
- Ends: Deacon Reservoir, Winnipeg, Manitoba
- Owner: City of Winnipeg

Characteristics
- Total length: 154 km (96 mi)
- Capacity: 85 million imp gal (390 million L)

History
- Engineering design by: Hering, Fuertes and Stearns
- Built: 1913-1919
- Opened: 1919

Location
- Interactive map of Greater Winnipeg Water District Aqueduct

The Greater Winnipeg Water District Aqueduct (GWWDA) is an aqueduct that supplies the city of Winnipeg, Manitoba, with water from Shoal Lake, Kenora District, Ontario. Winnipeg has relied on the lake as its source for safe drinking water since the aqueduct was put in service in 1919 at a cost of nearly CDN $16 million.

It has a capacity of 85 million imp gal (390 million L) per day (4.4 cubic metres per second), a capacity that was planned for a city of one million inhabitants; peak water usage by the city was in 1988 and the capacity of the aqueduct has never been entirely used.

The aqueduct extends approximately 154 kilometres (96 mi) from an intake structure on Shoal Lake to the Deacon Reservoir on the east side of the Winnipeg floodway, a few kilometres south of Highway 15. Water flows by gravity from the lake, since the aqueduct drops about 91 metres (300 ft) over its length.

Access by maintenance staff to the aqueduct has been provided by the Greater Winnipeg Water District Railway, also operated by the City, since 1916. The Railway formerly provided passenger and freight rail services to the public, from Winnipeg to the rail station at the Shoal Lake aqueduct intake.

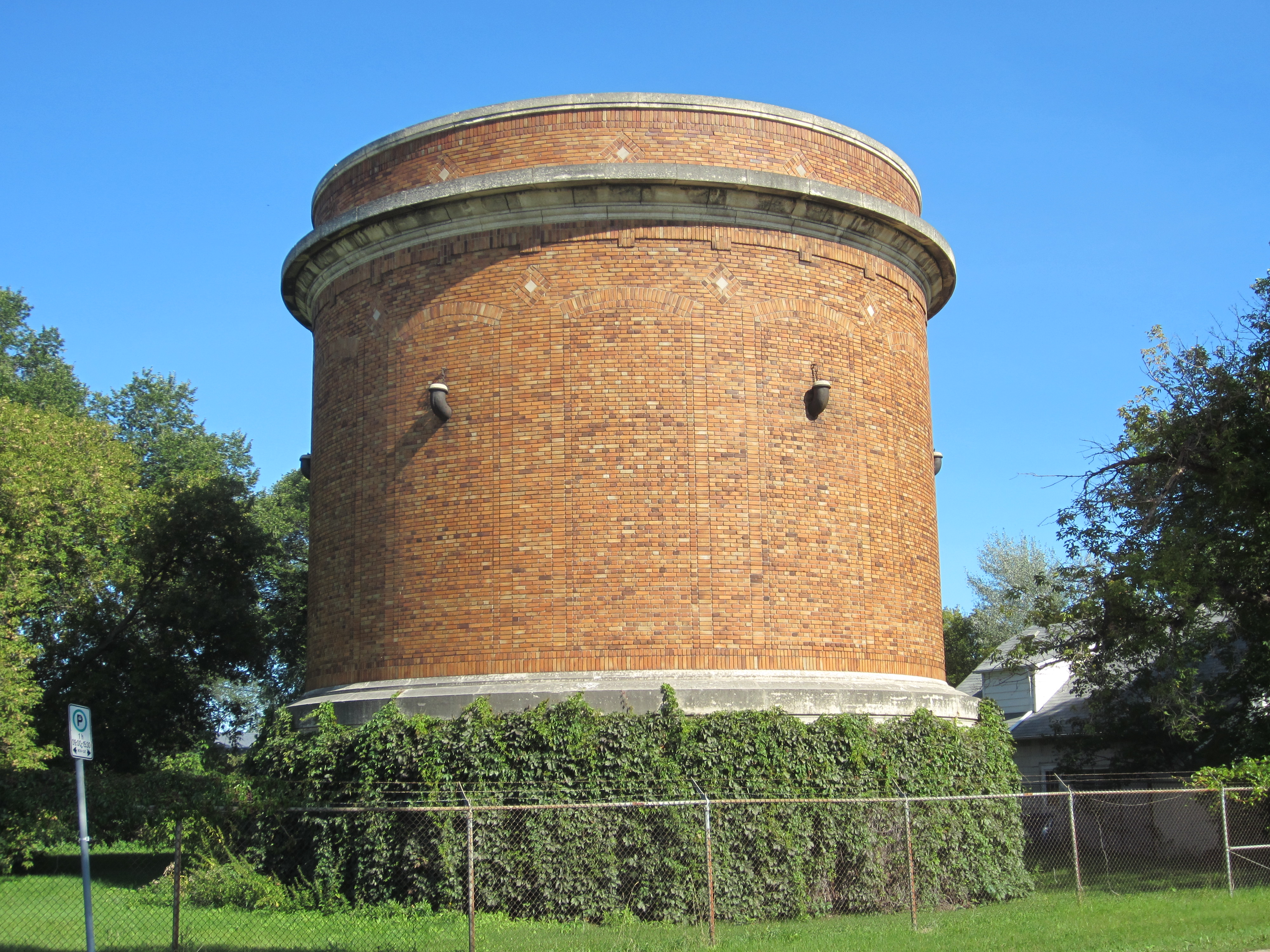
Overflow tank for Winnipeg aqueduct prevents pressure rise if water demand is low. Tache Ave. Winnipeg near 49°53′52.04″N 97°07′43.10″W

== History ==
=== Background ===
The first water supply system in Winnipeg was installed and operated by the private Winnipeg Water Works Company, which obtained its charter on 30 December 1880. The charter was for a 20-year period and the works were put into operation in 1882. The source of supply was the Assiniboine River, the intake and pumping station being located at Armstrong's Point on the north bank of the river immediately downstream from the Maryland Street Bridge.

In April 1899, the City of Winnipeg purchased the plant of the Water Works Company for $237,650, making it a municipally-owned and operated utility. At this time, the source of supply was changed from the Assiniboine River to artesian wells. In October 1900, the well supply was placed in operation.

Between 1900 and 1908, a group of seven wells were dug. These averaged about 5.5 metres (18 ft) in diameter and varied in depth from 14 to 31 metres (46 to 102 ft). In some years, their yield was not consistent and it was evident that a more adequate supply was needed for the rapidly increasing city population.

=== Creating the Greater Winnipeg Water District ===
On 23 July 1906, a commission was appointed to investigate the best available source of water supply. The commission engaged the services of a group of engineers which, on 29 August 1907, submitted a report that recommended the City to go to the Winnipeg River for its future water supply. The commission endorsed this recommendation and forwarded it to the Winnipeg City Council on 30 October 1907. At this time, the City was undertaking the building of a hydro electric generating station at Pointe du Bois and was committed to the expenditure of a large sum of money. Consequently, the water supply project was postponed until 1912.

In 1912, the Public Utilities Commissioner, at the request of the City of Winnipeg, caused an investigation to be made and obtained an engineering report that recommended Shoal Lake, Kenora District, Ontario—the western tributary of the Lake of the Woods watershed—as the source of water supply. Winnipeg Mayor Thomas R. Deacon spearheaded making Shoal Lake the city's water source, a project he had supported long before becoming mayor in 1913. The engineer's report also recommended sinking of additional wells to maintain a supply until the larger system could be completed.

In January 1913, a series of meetings was held between Winnipeg and several municipalities in the surrounding region, who reached an agreement on draft legislation to form a metropolitan water district.

This resulted in the creation of the Greater Winnipeg Water District (GWWD), incorporated by an Act of the Manitoba Legislature, assented to on 15 February 1913. The Act was passed contingent on the plan being approved by Winnipeg voters. The matter was submitted to vote on 1 May 1913 with 2,226 people in favour and 369 against. The areas included in the district were the City of Winnipeg, City of St. Boniface, Town of Transcona, and Rural Municipality of St. Vital, as well as a part of the Rural Municipality of Fort Garry, the Rural Municipality of Assiniboia, and the Rural Municipality of Kildonan.

=== Planning and construction ===
On 7 April 1913, the Winnipeg City Council appointed a Board of Consulting Engineers to estimate the cost and general plan of the project to supply the Greater Winnipeg Water District with water from Shoal Lake. This report was submitted on 20 August 1913 and contained the following recommendations:

- That Shoal Lake water is of excellent quality for domestic and for manufacturing purposes;
- That Shoal Lake can be depended on to furnish all the water required for the Greater Winnipeg Water District until the population shall have reached about 850,000 and with the help of the Lake of the Woods can furnish a practically inexhaustible supply;
- That this water be brought from Shoal Lake through a covered concrete aqueduct 136 kilometres (85 mi) in length under open flow conditions to within about eight miles from St. Boniface, thence through a 1.7-metre (5.6 ft) reinforced concrete circular pipe under pressure to the eastern bank of the Red River, thence through a 1.5-metre (5 ft) diameter cast iron pipe in tunnel under the river, and thence through a 1.2-metre (4 ft) diameter reinforced concrete pipe to the reservoirs at McPhillips Street.

The aqueduct between Shoal Lake and the Deacon Reservoir was to have a capacity of 390 million L (85 million imp gal) per day and the pressure portion to be capable of delivering to the McPhillips Street reservoirs about 140 million L (30 million imp gal) per day. The engineers estimated the total cost of the intake, diversion works, concrete aqueduct, pressure portion, and tunnel to be CA$13,045,600, excluding costs for land acquisition and for interest charges during construction.

The engineering report was adopted by the Administration Board of the Greater Winnipeg Water District on 6 September 1913. A by-law was passed to raise the sum of $13,500,000 for the project by the issue and sale of debentures. The plan was put to Winnipeg voters on 1 October 1913 and was approved by a vote of 2,951 in favour and 90 against.

As Shoal Lake is connected with, and is part of, the trans-boundary Lake of the Woods watershed, approval was required from the International Joint Commission which administered the 1909 Boundary Waters Treaty between the United States and Canada.

The project was carried out as outlined in the engineering report with the addition of a 250 million gallon reservoir at Deacon (about eight miles east of St. Boniface), a second 5-foot 6-inch pressure pipe from Deacon to the Red River, and a booster pumping station on the east bank of the Red River capable of delivering 50 million gallons per day to the reservoirs at McPhillips Street.

Surveying along the route of the aqueduct began in 1913 and construction commenced on 1 March 1914. The first work to be undertaken was the building of a 110-mile (180 km) railway, including siding and spurs, a telephone line, clearing and fencing of the right-of-way, and completion of the Falcon River diversion. Construction of the aqueduct began in May 1915 and was virtually completed by the end of 1918.

The Falcon River dam was constructed to divert discoloured water from the Falcon River through the newly created lake at the west end of Indian Bay and a channel was dug to convey this water to Snowshoe Bay, away from the aqueduct inlet.

=== Opening and beyond ===
On 29 March 1919, water from Shoal Lake arrived at the McPhillips Street reservoir and distribution to the City of Winnipeg began on 5 April 1919. The opening ceremony for the aqueduct was performed by Edward, Prince of Wales on 9 September 1919.

As a result of steadily increasing demand for water, construction of a booster pumping station adjacent to the Greater Winnipeg Water District's surge tank in St. Boniface was completed in 1950. This station allowed the District to fully develop the capacity of the existing works and to increase the flow to the City of Winnipeg from 30 to 42 million gallons per day. The station was equipped with three 20 million gallons per day pumping units with electrically controlled switchgear and electrically operated discharge valves. This was the first major addition to the District's aqueduct since the original works were completed in 1919.

In 1954, the District completed a direct 41-centimetre (16 in) diameter pipe connection between the aqueduct and the Municipality of St. Vital, the cost being borne between the District and St. Vital. A pumping station was paid for and operated by St. Vital.

Equipment to fluoridate the water supply was installed at the aqueduct intake and operations commenced on 28 December 1956.

In June 2019, a road to serve the Shoal Lake 40 reserve was completed and officially opened. Residents of Shoal Lake 40 living on the peninsula between Indian and Snowshoe Bays were initially land-locked by the channel conveying water to Snowshoe Bay, and the water in Snowshoe Bay was often not potable.

The Shoal Lake 40 First Nation community had proposed developments but they were cancelled in the interest of protecting the watershed. In lieu of these cancelled developments, a trust fund for the First Nation was set up, to which both the City of Winnipeg and the Province of Manitoba both contribute to.

== Description ==
The entry structure is located at Indian Bay, Shoal Lake, Ontario. On its way to Winnipeg the aqueduct and railway pass through East Braintree, McMunn, Hadashville, Spruce, Larkhill, Monominto, Millbrook and Deacon stations.

The system consists of about 83-mile (134 km) of buried concrete unpressurized conduit and 9.9-mile (16 km) of buried pressurized inverted siphons. Over its length the aqueduct crosses eight rivers. The conduit was built using the "cut and cover" method with an unreinforced concrete arch resting on a cast in place base invert. Sections at road and rail crossings had reinforcing steel. Siphon crossings of rivers were made as reinforced round concrete tubes. The interior dimensions of the aqueduct were selected so that no internal pressure was developed by the water flow; nineteen different interior sections were required. For inspection and maintenance, manholes were provided at approximately 1 mile intervals, which allow insertion of a small boat for inspections. Vent pipes in the manholes allowed controlled entry of air.

Structural design was complicated by the widely varying ground conditions, ranging from rock to soft peat soil. In some places, gravel fill was brought in to replace unsuitable material excavated. The depth of backfill was intended to protect the aqueduct from freezing.

To allow surface water to drain freely across the path of the aqueduct, inverted siphons were installed at fifty-six locations. Freezing was prevented by ensuring the outlet level was always below water level, preventing cold air from entering the siphon.

Since the Falcon River entering Shoal Lake drains a considerable area of muskeg, a dike was built in the lake to prevent brown, organics-laden water from being drawn into the aqueduct. The intake structure included dual intake chambers to allow for maintenance of one while the other was in use. Again, to prevent cold air from entering, the intake level was well below the lake level.

Initially the aqueduct terminated at a reservoir built on McPhillips Street, which had been the center of the city's original water system. The design of the project included provisions for an additional reservoir approximately 13-mile (21 km) east of the McPhillips reservoir. This would allow for peak loads to be served in excess of the aqueduct's nominal capacity and allow for maintenance shutdowns of the aqueduct without interrupting the city's water supply.

=== Deacon Reservoir ===
The McPhillips reservoir in the north-west part of the city holds 227 megalitres. The Wilkes reservoir in the southern part holds 251 megalitres. The McLean reservoir in the eastern part of the city holds 205 megalitres. The Deacon reservoir near 49°50′57.29″N 96°56′07.63″W, built in 1972 with eight open cells, holds 8800 megalitres, equal to a 20-day supply for the city. It is named after Thomas Russ Deacon, who as Mayor of the city drove efforts to secure the Shoal Lake water supply.

== Greater Winnipeg Water District ==
The Greater Winnipeg Water District (GWWD) was a water district serving the Greater Winnipeg area.

The GWWD covered an area of 166.8 km^{2} (64.42 mi^{2}) and included the City of Winnipeg (65 km^{2}); parts of the Cities of St. Boniface (17.7 km^{2}), St. James (18.8 km^{2}), and East Kildonan (9 km^{2}); parts of the Towns of Transcona (12.8 km^{2}) and Tuxedo (1.9 km^{2}); and parts of the Municipalities of Fort Garry (20.8 km^{2}), St. Vital (14.3 km^{2}), and West Kildonan (6.2 km^{2}).

It was established in 1913 as a collaboration between the City of Winnipeg and its neighbouring municipalities, who decided to invest CA$13.5 million to access Shoal Lake. Winnipeg Mayor Thomas R. Deacon spearheaded making Shoal Lake the city's water source, a project he had supported long before becoming mayor in 1913. In January 1913, a series of meetings was held between Winnipeg and the municipalities, who reached an agreement on draft legislation to form a water district. On February 15 that year, An Act to incorporate the ‘Greater Winnipeg Water District,’ was assented to in the Manitoba Legislature.

The District was administered by a Board composed of the Mayor of Winnipeg and four other members of City Council; the Mayor of St. Boniface and one other member of its City Council; and the Mayors of St. James, East Kildonan, Transcona, Fort Garry, St. Vital, West Kildonan, and Tuxedo. The Mayor of Winnipeg was the ex officio Chairman, and the work of the corporation was managed by a Board of Commissioners consisting of one to three persons.

The District sold water in bulk—without pressure—and at the same price, to the several participating municipalities. This price was at first based on the cost of maintenance, operation, and management; the Greater Winnipeg Water District Act provided that interest and sinking fund charges should be levied on land only. The GWWD Act was amended in 1927 to allow a maximum price of five cents per thousand gallons to be charged, which became effective on 1 January 1938. Any surplus from sales was used to reduce the annual level based on the findings on an equalization board

The District also operated a railway service between St. Boniface and Shoal Lake, and a sand and gravel business.

The GWWD was eventually succeeded by the City of Winnipeg Water and Waste Department.

== Commemoration ==
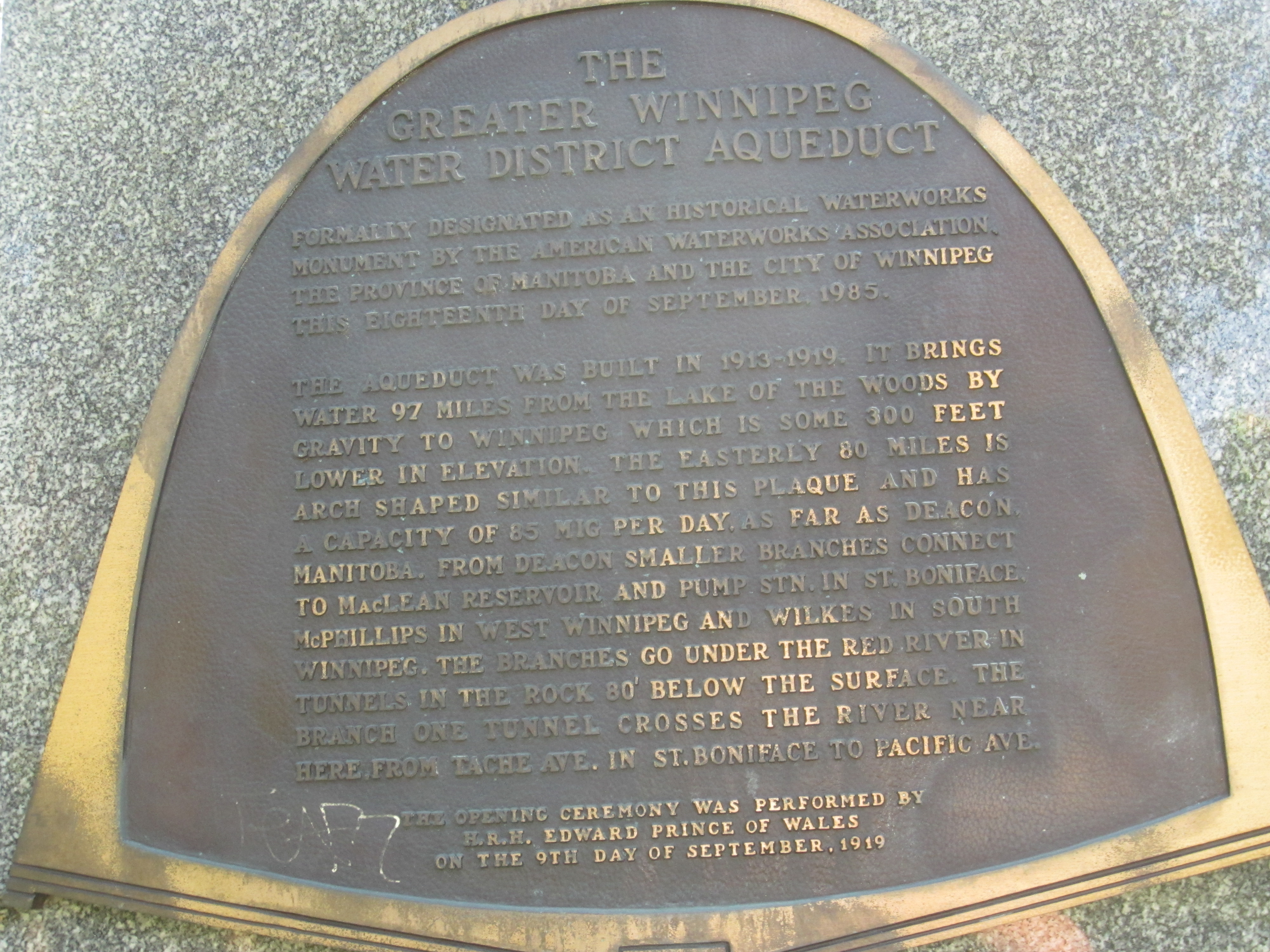
Plaque on aqueduct monument, Stephen Juba Park, Waterfront Drive, shows shape of much of the buried conduit, near 49°53′54.37″N 97°07′57.72″W

A stone monument was unveiled at the foot of James Avenue in Stephen Juba Park in Winnipeg to commemorate the aqueduct. The monument includes a Historic Sites Advisory Board of Manitoba plaque designed in the shape of the aqueduct pipe, a Canadian Water Landmark plaque by the American Water Works Association, and a National Historic Civil Engineering Site plaque unveiled in 1994 by the Canadian Society for Civil Engineering.

On 17 October 1960, the Second Branch Aqueduct was opened as a branch line built to secure the maximum capacity of the GWWD Aqueduct. At the branch's official opening, a plaque and stone & metal sculpture were also unveiled. Originally located on the west side of Pembina Highway, it was moved in 1988 when Bishop Grandin Boulevard was extended west from River Road to Waverley Street and the underpass at Pembina Highway had to be built.

== See also ==
- Shoal Lake 40 First Nation
