= Niisaachewan Anishinaabe Nation =

First nation

Coordinates: 49°53′31″N 94°32′32″W

Niisaachewan Anishinaabe Nation, formerly but still commonly—and incorrectly—known as the Dalles First Nation and Ochiichagwe'Babigo'Ining Ojibway Nation, is an Anishinaabe/Ojibway First Nation in Kenora District, Ontario about 15 kilometres north of Lake of the Woods.

The total registered Band membership as of November 2021 is 493], and the on-reserve population as of 2016 is 190]. A member of Treaty 3, the First Nation is affiliated with Bimose Tribal Council and Kenora Chiefs Advisory.

== Reserves ==
The First Nation have reserved for themselves two reserves:

- 3,257 ha (8,050 acres) The Dalles Indian Reserve 38C, which serves as their main Reserve, with the community of Niisaachewan Anishinaabe Nation adjacent to it.
- 379 ha (940 acres) Agency Indian Reserve 30, which is shared with 12 other First Nations.

== Grievances ==
The First Nation has recently settled two grievances against Hydro One and Ontario Power Generation. The grievance against Hydro One was started because the company arbitrarily cut down trees, and misappropriated land without making any effort to consult the First Nation to install huge steel electricity pylons across the reserve. Hydro One acknowledged liability (without an apology) by settling the claim for an undisclosed amount.

The grievance against Ontario Power Generation was a far bigger issue. Many years ago, again without notice or an effort to consult with the First Nation, what used to be called Ontario Hydro arbitrarily flooded over one thousand acres (4 km^{2}) of reserve land and many more thousands of acres of traditional resource area by building the Whitedog Dam to provide electricity for sale by Ontario Hydro.

The detrimental effects of the flooding and water flow change resulted in a huge loss of culture for the area's First Nation people, including but not limited to the loss of cultural activities such as hunting, and rice harvesting.

Ontario Power Generation acknowledged liability by settling for an undisclosed amount. Also, unlike Hydro One, Ontario Power Generation officially apologized for the harm to the community] during a visit to the community by Jake Epp, Chairman of the Board.

Legal grievances remain as a result of Canada's Federal Government giving Ontario Power Generation permission to reroute the Winnipeg River through the reserve via the relief channel blasted through the reserve. A rock sacred to the people of Niisaachewan Anishinaabe Nation was also completely destroyed by explosives to clear way for the water channel.

== Governance ==
Through the Custom Electoral System, Niisaachewan Anishinaabe Nation elects a council for a two-year term consisting of a Chief and four Councillors.

The traditional 'Customary Council' system is the Nation's preferred method of governance. The Customary Council is where a respected head person or speaker from each of the family groups within the Nation is chosen and this group of head people are the ones who have advisory powers and dispute resolving responsibility. Chief and Council is a relatively new system of governance, and the current are supposed to be gradually phasing themselves out in favour of the Customary Council system.
