= Ste. Rita, Manitoba =

Ste. Rita
- Location of Ste. Rita in Manitoba
- Coordinates: 49°52′48″N 96°17′44″W
- Country: Canada
- Province: Manitoba
- Region: Eastman Region
- Census Division: No. 1

Government
  - Governing Body: Rural Municipality of Reynolds Council
  - MP: Vic Toews
  - MLA: Konrad Narth
- Time zone: UTC−6 (CST)
  - Summer (DST): UTC−5 (CDT)
- Area codes: 204, 431
- NTS Map: 062H16
- GNBC Code: GAXXN

Ste. Rita is an unincorporated community in the Rural Municipality of Reynolds, Manitoba, located on Manitoba Highway 15 and east of Winnipeg.

The post office was established in the area as Rita in 1934, officially becoming Ste. Rita in 1965. It closed a few years later, and became a lumber yard, which has also been closed for many years now. The Canadian National Railway passes through the community, and the railway point was known as Craig or Craig Siding.

For food supplies, residents travel to Beausejour, Anola, Dugald, Oakbank, and Winnipeg; for school, students are bussed to Anola, Dugald, and Oakbank. For fire protection, Ste. Rita is looked after by the fire department in Springfield.

A community centre, called Ste. Rita Friendly Hands Club, was built in 1984 and is still in operation today.
