= Camp Pioneer =

Camp Pioneer may refer to:

- Camp Pioneer (West Virginia)
- Camp Pioneer (Oregon)
- Camp Pioneer (Arkansas)
- Camp Pioneer (Louisiana)
- Camp Pioneer (New Mexico)

== See also ==
- Manitoba Pioneer Camp
- Young Pioneer camp
