= Northwesternmost point of the Lake of the Woods =

Landmark for the boundary between United States and Canada

The northwesternmost point of the Lake of the Woods was a critical landmark for the boundary between United States territory and the British possessions to the north. This point, on the shore of the Lake of the Woods, was referred to in the Treaty of Paris in 1783 and in later treaties including the Treaty of 1818. The point lies at the corner of the Northwest Angle in the U.S. state of Minnesota, and is thus the northernmost point of the contiguous United States. After Canadian Confederation, the point became the basis for the border between the Canadian provinces of Manitoba and Ontario.

Example demonstrating how the most northwest point of the Lake of the Woods was determined. If the line intersects any part of the lake, it is determined not to be the most northwest point of the Lake of the Woods.

The "northwesternmost point" of the lake had not yet been identified when it was referenced in treaties defining the border between the US and Britain; it was simply an easily described abstraction based on a large landmark. The best maps at the time of the original negotiation depicted the lake as a simple oval. However, although the southern portion of the lake is easily mapped, to the north it becomes a complex tangle of bays, peninsulas, and islands, with many adjacent bodies of water separated or connected by narrow isthmuses or straits. An 1822 survey crew declared the referenced point impossible to determine. In 1824, British explorer David Thompson was hired to identify it. Thompson mapped the lake and found four possibilities, but did not conclusively declare one location.

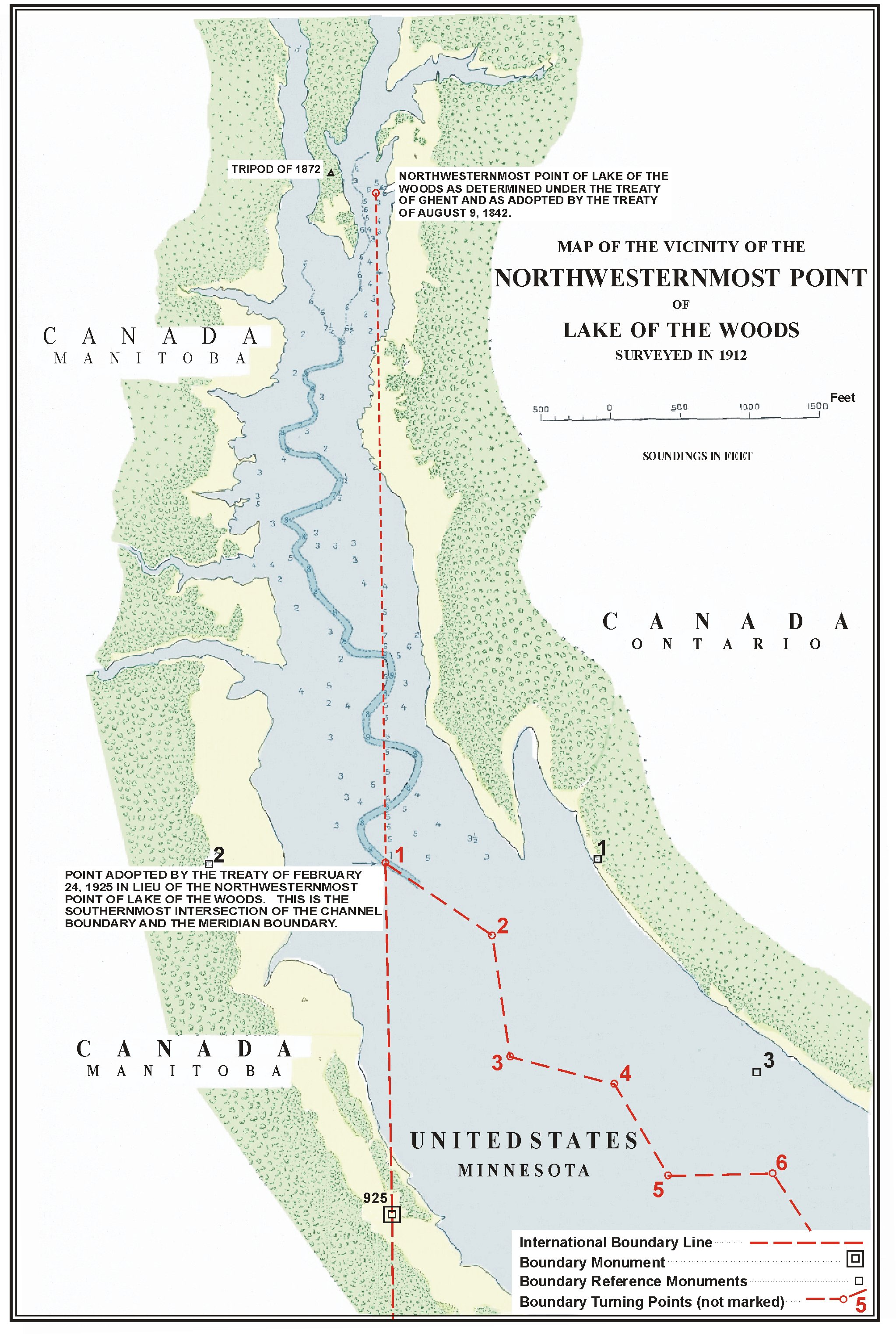
Surveyors report (1912) of the northwesternmost point of Lake of the Woods

In 1825, Johann Ludwig Tiarks, a German astronomer in British service, surveyed the lake. Tiarks identified two possibilities for the northwesternmost point on the lake, based on Thompson's maps: the Angle Inlet and Rat Portage. To determine which point was the most northwestern, he drew a line from each point in the southwest–northeast direction. If the line intersected the lake at any point, it was not the most northwestern point, as shown in the example diagram here. Tiarks determined that the only such line that did not intersect the lake was at the edge of a pond on the Angle Inlet. (A 1940 academic study documents this point as being in the immediate vicinity of 49°23′51.324″N 95°9′12.20783″W (NAD83).)

Under the 1783 treaty, the international border would have run due west from this point to the Mississippi River. As this was determined to be geographically impossible (the Mississippi begins further south), under the 1818 treaty the international border instead ran from the point determined by Tiarks, to the 49th parallel. (It was not known at the time whether that was to the north or – in fact – the south.) From there it ran due west to the Rocky Mountains (and later, the Pacific coast).

Tiarks's point, however, created problems, because the 1818 treaty called for the border to run directly north–south from it. South of that point, the channel of the Northwest Angle Inlet meandered east and west, crossing the border five times, thereby creating two small enclaves of water areas totaling two and a half acres that belonged to the United States but were surrounded by Canadian waters. A 1925 treaty addressed this by adopting the southernmost of the points where the channel and the border intersected – approximately 5,000 ft (1,500 m) south of Tiarks's point – as the new "northwesternmost point".

The new northwesternmost point thus became 49°23′4.14″N 95°9′11.34″W, based on the NAD27 datum, which is equivalent to 49°23′4.12373″N 95°9′12.20783″W under the modern NAD83 datum.
