= Division No. 1, Manitoba =

Census division in Canada

Coordinates: 49°53′N 95°58′W

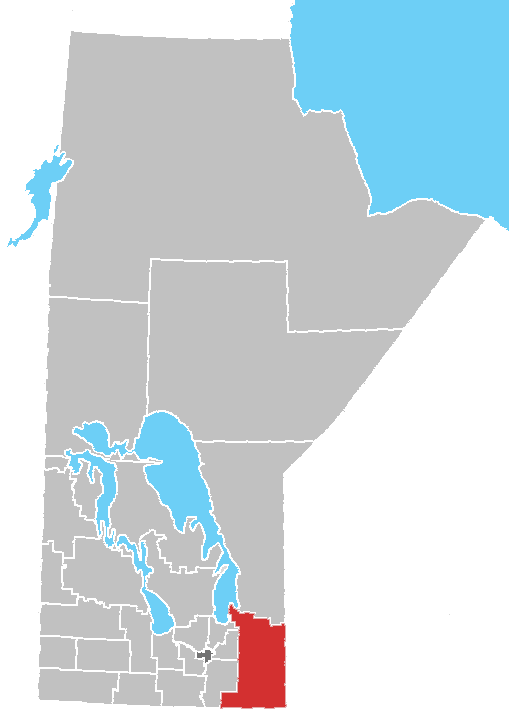
Location of Division 1 in Manitoba

Division No. 1 is a census division located within the Eastman Region of the Canadian province of Manitoba. Unlike in some other provinces, census divisions do not reflect the organization of local government in Manitoba. These areas exist solely for the purposes of statistical analysis and presentation; they have no government of their own.

It is located in the south-eastern corner of the province, lying between the Lake Winnipeg and Manitoba-Ontario border, and the Canada–US border. The Trans-Canada Highway runs through the Eastman Region. Also included in the division are the Buffalo Point First Nation and the Manitoba portion of the Shoal Lake 40 First Nation.

== Demographics ==
In the 2021 Census of Population conducted by Statistics Canada, Division No. 1 had a population of 20,114 living in 8,761 of its 17,862 total private dwellings, a change of 8.5% from its 2016 population of 18,534. With a land area of 14,801.95 km^{2} (5,715.06 sq mi), it had a population density of 1.4/km^{2} (3.5/sq mi) in 2021.

== Subdivisions ==
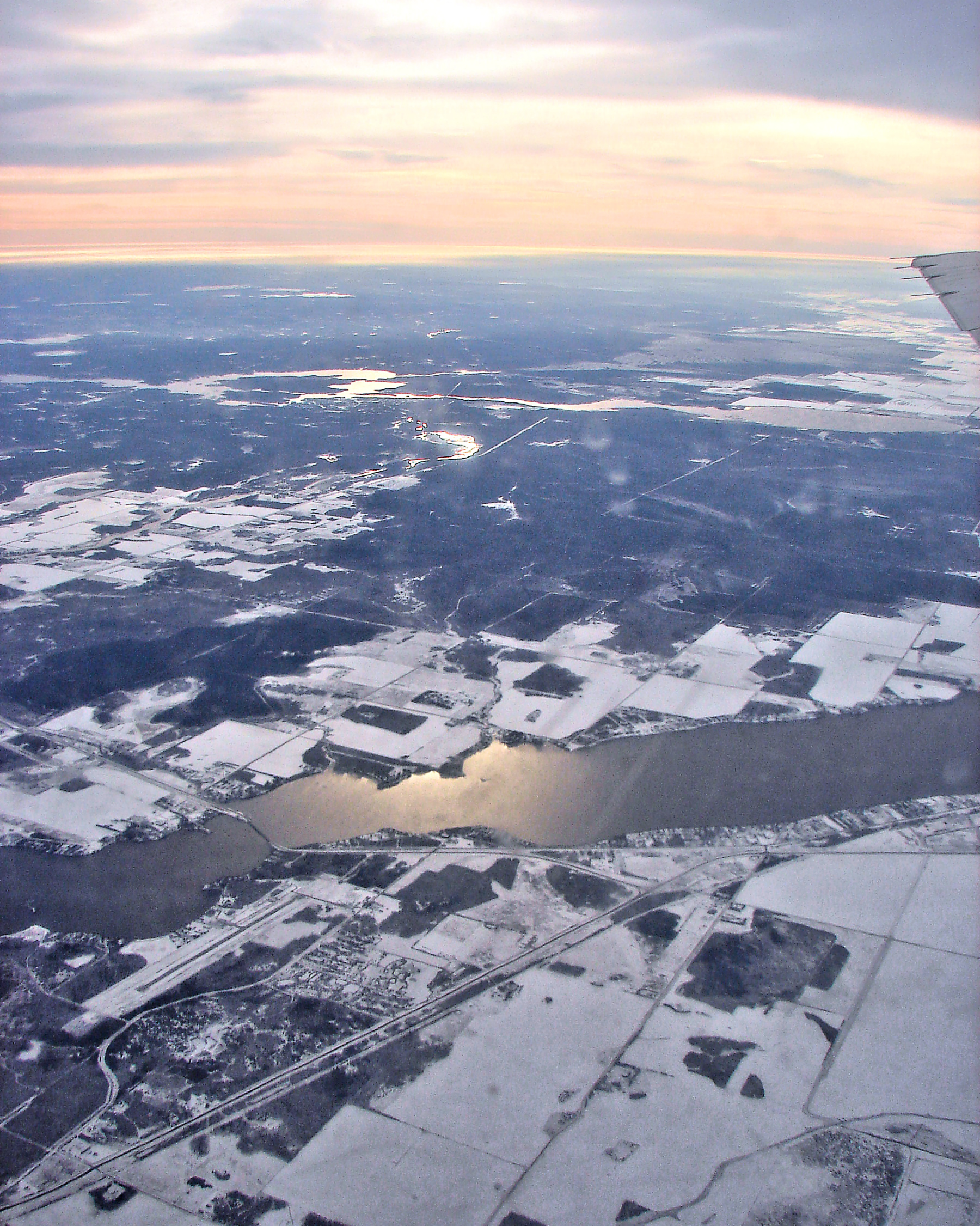
Aerial view of Lac du Bonnet RM and Pinawa LGD, with Unorganized Div. 1 in the distant background

=== Towns ===
- Lac du Bonnet
- Powerview-Pine Falls

=== Local government districts ===
- Pinawa

=== Rural municipalities ===
- Alexander
- Lac du Bonnet
- Piney
- Reynolds
- Stuartburn
- Victoria Beach
- Whitemouth

=== First Nations reserves ===
- Shoal Lake 37A
- Shoal Lake 39
- Shoal Lake 39A
- Shoal Lake 40

=== Unorganized areas ===
- Unorganized Division 1
