= Stephen Juba Park =

Urban park in Winnipeg, Canada

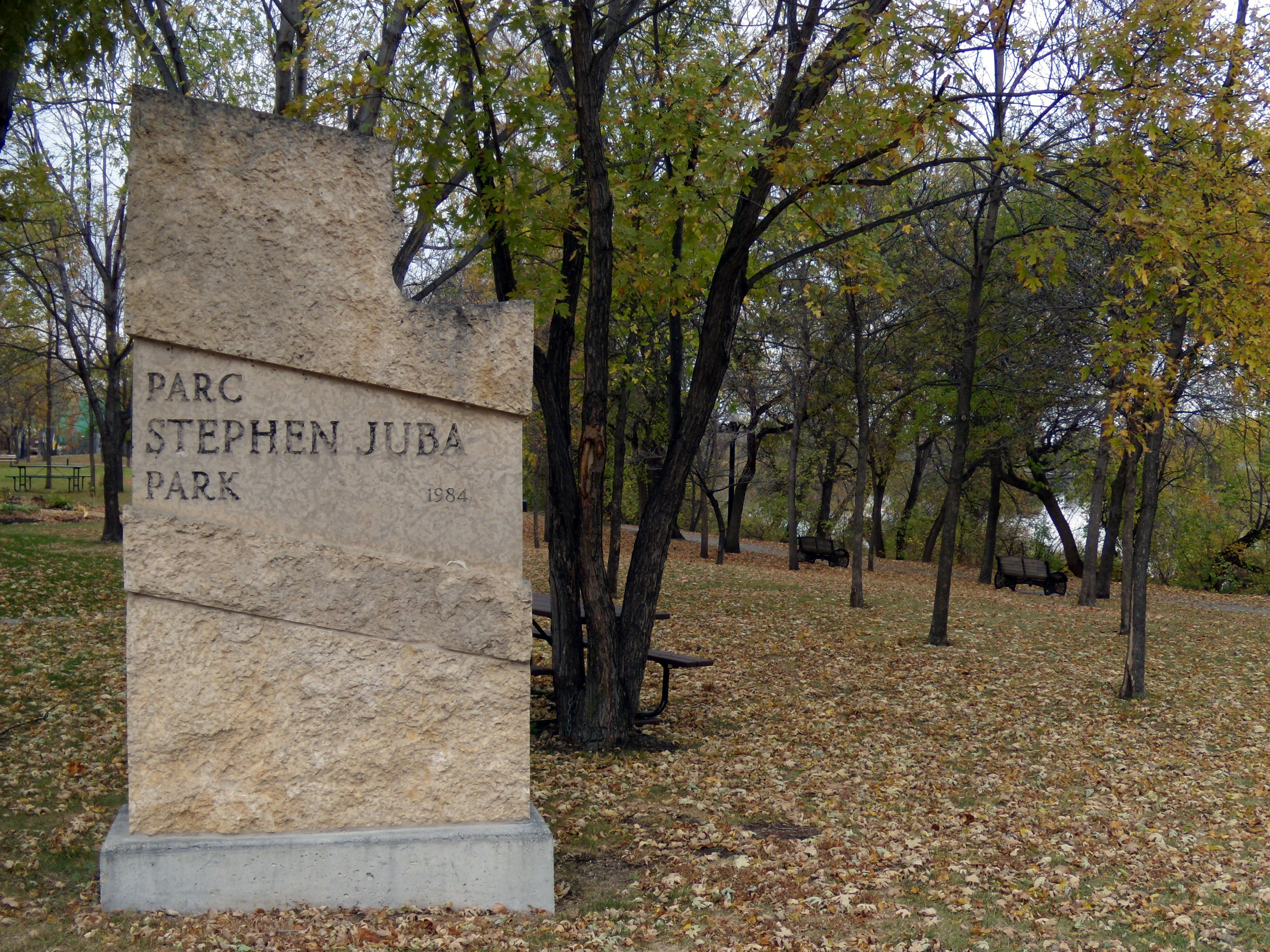
- Interactive map of Stephen Juba Park
- Coordinates: 49°53′49″N 97°07′58″W
- Public transit: Winnipeg Transit; 31

Stephen Juba Park, named after Stephen Juba, is located in Winnipeg, Manitoba, Canada. It is a waterfront park on the western bank of the Red River and runs from downtown Winnipeg to the Exchange District. The park features bike paths, landscaping and a Water Taxi dock. The park has an extensive multi-user path system, open areas and public art works by local artists.

The park was created in 1983 after the city and province agreed to set aside waterfront land for a park. Construction of the park began in August 1983, funded jointly by the province and the city of Winnipeg.

The City of Winnipeg dedicated the park to Stephen Juba on 14 October 1983, when they unveiled a monument to him at the park. Two committees had recommended naming the park after the long-serving politician. The park underwent significant upgrades as part of the City of Winnipeg's $9.1 million Waterfront Drive project in 2004. The redevelopment redesigned the park to make the riverfront more accessible to the community.

== Monuments ==
The park contains a monument to the Greater Winnipeg Water District Aqueduct, which has been identified as one of the historic sites in Winnipeg.

A volunteer group planted a memorial garden for overdose victims in 2019.

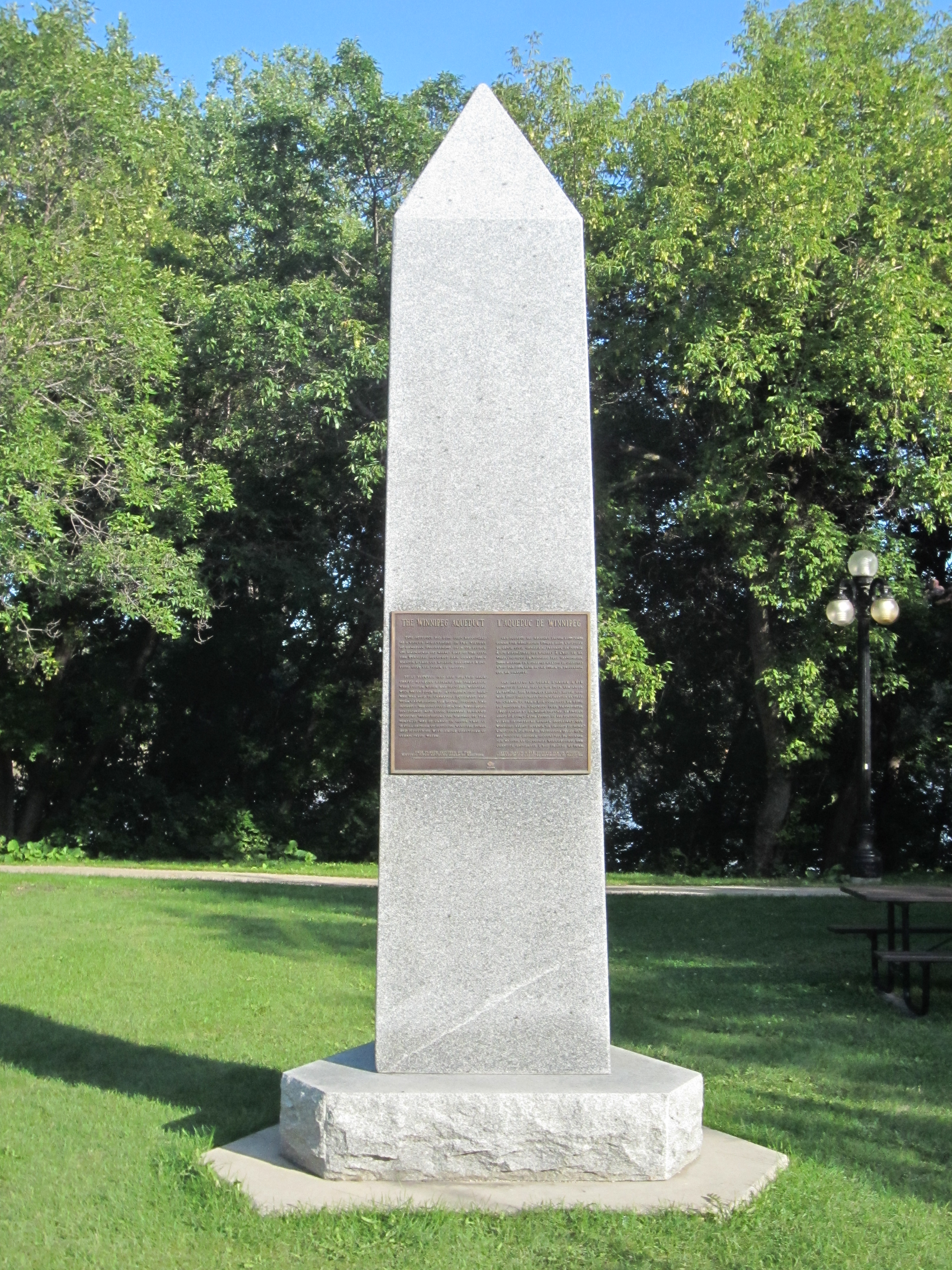
Monument to the Greater Winnipeg Water District Aqueduct, a portion of which runs underneath the river and park near 49°53′54.37″N 97°07′57.72″W
