= Shoal Lake 39 =

- Indian reserve
- Shoal Lake Indian Reserve No. 39
- Location within Canada
- Coordinates: 49°30′N 95°09′W
- Country: Canada
- Provinces: Manitoba, Ontario
- Division / District: Division 1 / Kenora
- First Nation: Iskatewizaagegan 39

Area
  - Land: 4.19 km^{2} (1.62 sq mi)

Shoal Lake 39 is a First Nations reserve on Shoal Lake straddling the border between Manitoba and Ontario. It is one of the reserves of the Iskatewizaagegan 39 Independent First Nation.
