= Shoal Lake 34B2 =

- Indian reserve
- Shoal Lake Indian Reserve No. 34B2
- Location within Ontario
- Coordinates: 49°36′N 95°07′W
- Country: Canada
- Province: Ontario
- District: Kenora
- First Nations: Iskatewizaagegan 39, Shoal Lake 40

Area
  - Land: 1.73 km^{2} (0.67 sq mi)

Population (2011)
  - Total: 97
  - Density: 56.2/km^{2} (146/sq mi)
- Website: www.sl40.ca

Shoal Lake 34B2 is a First Nations reserve on the shores of Shoal Lake in northwestern Ontario. It is shared between the Iskatewizaagegan 39 Independent First Nation and Shoal Lake 40 First Nation.
