= Bimose Tribal Council =

Canadian political organization

Bimose Tribal Council is a First Nations council, one of three such councils on the Grand Council of Treaty 3. Its members include:

- Asubpeeschoseewagong First Nation
- Eagle Lake First Nation
- Iskatewizaagegan 39 Independent First Nation
- Lac des Mille Lacs First Nation
- Naotkamegwanning First Nation
- Niisaachewan Anishinaabe Nation
- Obashkaandagaang Bay First Nation
- Shoal Lake 40 First Nation
- Wabaseemoong Independent Nations
- Wabauskang First Nation, and
- Wabigoon Lake Ojibway Nation
