= Thomas Russ Deacon =

Canadian politician (1865–1955)

Mayor Thomas Russ Deacon
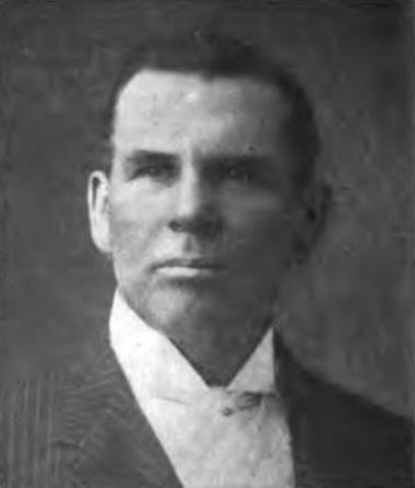

24th Mayor of Winnipeg

Personal details
- Born: 3 January 1865 Perth, Canada West
- Died: 30 May 1955 (aged 90) Winnipeg, Manitoba, Canada
- Spouse: Lily Dingman (m. 1894)
- Profession: Civil engineer

Thomas Russ Deacon (3 January 1865 – 30 May 1955) was a Canadian politician, the 24th Mayor of Winnipeg in 1913 and 1914.

Deacon was born in Perth, Canada West. After working in Northern Ontario lumber camps, he returned to school, eventually graduating in 1891 with a civil engineering degree at the University of Toronto. After working on the water systems in North Bay, Ontario and on gold mining in Rat Portage, Deacon moved to Winnipeg in 1902 and by 1906 joined the city's council.

He campaigned for mayor on the basis of developing a new source of city water from Shoal Lake in northwestern Ontario. This Greater Winnipeg Water District Aqueduct system was created during Deacon's terms as mayor. The Deacon reservoir, built in 1972, was named for Thomas Deacon.
