= John Lewis Tiarks =

John Lewis Tiarks, FRS (born Johann Ludwig Tiarks, 10 May 1789 – 1 May 1837), Johann Ludwig Tiarks, was a German mathematician who became the British astronomer to the North American Boundary Line Commission.

== Early life ==
He was born in Waddewarden, Wangerland, Friesland, Lower Saxony on 10 May 1789. His father was Reverend Johann Gerhard Tiarks and his mother was Christine Dorothea Ehrentraut.

He entered the University of Göttingen to study theology but transferred to the mathematics course. He took a position as a private tutor. He received a doctorate in mathematics in 1808. Having gained his degree he initially moved to Hamburg. He fled to England in 1810 to avoid conscription by Napoleon. He became assistant librarian and factotum to Joseph Banks at the Royal Society.

== First visit to North America ==
In 1817, on Banks’ recommendation, he was appointed an astronomer to one of the commissions established under the Treaty of Ghent. He acted for Joseph Bouchette who fell ill that year. He remained with the commission after Bouchette was replaced with William Franklin Odell. In September 1817 he arrived in Akwesasne to make astronomical observations. He befriended many of the local Mohawk people and their priest, Father Joseph Marcoux.

At the end of July 1818 Tiarks and his group left Akwesasne and with the American surveying team headed to Lake Champlain. Ferdinand Rudolph Hassler headed the American team. At the lake both teams independently discovered that John Collins and others had incorrectly located the 45th parallel north, placing the fort at Rouses Point, New York in British territory. The American members of the boundary commission refused to accept the findings. Hassler had been replaced as astronomer by Andrew Ellicott, who was far less cooperative. Ellicott was reported as saying to Tiarks "we should not do our work so exactingly and forget about completing most of it". Tiarks refused to go along with the suggestion, as he felt it put his reputation on the line. He was strongly supported in this by British Commissioner Thomas Henry Barclay.

In 1819 he was working in the upper Connecticut River basin where part of the boundary was to run. During summer 1820 he was working in what became northwestern New Brunswick and nearby areas of Quebec, returning to the upper Connecticut that fall. Disputes between British and American commissioners brought his work to a halt and he returned to Europe in 1821.

== Europe ==
Due to delays in proceeding with the border project, the British Admiralty asked him in the meantime to determine the longitude of various European locations, such as Madeira, with the help of chronometers, for which the SS Comet had been specially outfitted. He was joined from 30 June to 17 August 1824 by Humphry Davy who used the voyage to Norway to test his zinc protectors for ships' bottoms. In 1825 Tiarks was elected a Fellow of the Royal Society as "a person well versed in mathematics and nautical astronomy".

== Second visit to North America ==
He returned to North America in 1825 to determine the northwestermost point of the Lake of the Woods, from which the boundary was supposed to run due west to the Mississippi River.

From 1826 to 1830 he worked on matters of concern to the boundary commission. He was called to The Hague to explain certain points to William II of the Netherlands, who had been asked to arbitrate the boundary question. Tiarks returned to Jeven.

== Personal life ==
In 1822 he married Auguste Antoinette Sophie Toel of Jever. They had several children, but only one daughter survived to adulthood.

== Final years and death ==
He long wished to be a professor in a German university, but no position ever became available. In March 1837 he suffered from a stroke from which he never recovered.

The Webster–Ashburton Treaty, which settled the boundary disputes in question, was signed in 1842.
