= The Dalles 38C =

- Indian reserve
- The Dalles Indian Reserve No. 38C
- Location within Ontario
- Coordinates: 49°53′N 94°32′W
- Country: Canada
- Province: Ontario
- District: Kenora
- First Nation: Niisaachewan Anishinaabe Nation

Area
  - Land: 32.84 km^{2} (12.68 sq mi)

Population (2011)
  - Total: 195
  - Density: 5.9/km^{2} (15/sq mi)
- Website: www.niisaachewan.ca

The Dalles 38C is an Ojibwe First Nation reserve in Kenora District, and is the main reserve of the Niisaachewan Anishinaabe Nation.
