= Shoal Lake 40 First Nation =

Ojibwe reserve in Manitoba and Ontario

Coordinates: 49°36′45″N 95°08′41″W

Shoal Lake 40 First Nation (Ojibwe: Iskatewi-zaaga'iganiing 40) is an Ojibway or Ontario First Nation reserve located in the Eastman Region of Manitoba and the Kenora District of Ontario. The total registered population in December 2022 was 683, of which the on-reserve population was 306. The First Nation is a member of the Bimose Tribal Council, a Regional Chiefs' Council that is a member of the Grand Council of Treaty 3.

The community inhabits a man-made island. It is accessible via barge traffic from Iskatewizaagegan 39 First Nation's dock, located in the community of Kejick, Ontario, and in winter by ice roads. The construction of a new all-season road to link the community with the Trans-Canada Highway was secured after an agreement was reached between three levels of government on how the cost would be covered. The road, aptly named Freedom Road, was eventually built between 2017 and 2019.

The First Nation possesses basic infrastructure, limited retail outlets, and indoor and outdoor recreational facilities and provides local elementary schooling to grade 8.

== History ==
=== Indian Bay and drinking water ===
In 1915 the City of Winnipeg expropriated over 3,000 acres of Shoal Lake 40 ancestral land, relocating a longstanding village site and over 100 residents. By 1919 this area became the intake facility for the Greater Winnipeg Water District Aqueduct, pumping approximately 85 million gallons per day to the city. The construction project involved the excavation of indigenous burial grounds and disinterment of human remains.

In 1980, both First Nation bands in the area (#39 and #40) planned to develop 350 cottage lots on Indian Bay, Shoal Lake. This project was opposed by the City of Winnipeg because of concerns about the safety of its drinking water, which is drawn from Indian Bay. The dispute was settled in 1989 when the Greater Winnipeg Water District placed $6 million in trust for Shoal Lake 40, with the interest to be used to fund alternative development projects. The agreement was conditional on a contribution of $3 million from the federal government. A tripartite agreement was finalized when a parallel agreement was signed between the federal government and Shoal Lake 40 in 1990. In the meantime, Shoal Lake began importing water by barge or truck at a substantial cost. A formal drinking water advisory was only announced in 1997.

In 2011, when the proposal for a new water treatment plant showed that the cost would be more than anticipated, the federal government refused to contribute the difference and the plan was abandoned. Instead, Shoal Lake proposed the construction of an all-weather road to guarantee safe year-round access to the reserve and for the importation of water.

=== Freedom Road and treatment facility ===
Shoal Lake 40 joined forces with the neighbouring Manitoba municipality of Reynolds to encourage the building of an all-weather road by two levels of government, in order to connect with the Trans-Canada Highway. In earlier years, the community obtained many necessary supplies and goods via the Greater Winnipeg Water District Railway as they were shipped to the aqueduct water intake site. This terminus site for the railway was also known as Waugh Station.

In 2015, the government agreed to pay for a design project for the study, but would not promise to pay for the construction of "Freedom Road" itself. Earlier in the year, the community's barge ferry failed to pass inspection and the local leadership declared a state of emergency. Funding was later approved and construction of the new road started in Spring 2017. Completion of the road in June 2019 has reconnected the community to the rest of Canada, allowing emergency services to enter easily, waste to be transported out, and residents to access health services outside of the community. The Freedom Road project intersects the eastbound lanes of the Trans-Canada Highway (Hwy #1) at a point 3.7 km west of Route 301 in Falcon Beach, MB.

On September 15, 2021, a 33 million CAD water treatment facility was opened in the reserve, giving the reserve access to clean drinking water. The completion of the facility was due, in part, to a lower price tag thanks to the construction of the Freedom Road.

== Reserves ==
This First Nation occupies three reserves:

- 2579 ha Shoal Lake 40, which serves as their main Reserve, containing the community of Indian Bay, Manitoba
- 172.4 ha Shoal Lake 34B2 Indian Reserve
- 379 ha Agency 30 Indian Reserve, which is shared with 12 other First Nations

== Governance ==
Shoal Lake 40 First Nation elects their leadership through the Act Electoral System for two year terms.

=== Chief and Council ===
- 2014–Present: Chief Erwin Redsky and 4 Councillors: Brenda Freel, Herbert Green, Vernon Redsky and Billy Wahpay.
- 2012-2014: 2014–Present: Chief Erwin Redsky and 4 Councillors: Herbert Green, Vernon Redsky, Tania Bruyere, and Preston Green.
- 2010-2012: Chief Erwin Redsky and 4 Councillors: Tom Anderson, Marcella Meekis, Vernon Redsky and Billy Wahpay.

== Media ==
Shoal Lake 40 was featured the 360° documentary experience film, Cut-Off VR which places the viewer in the middle of Prime Minister Justin Trudeau's historic visit to Shoal Lake 40. Viewers also visit Cross Lake, where a state of emergency was declared after a wave of youth suicides. The film was created by Vice and Occupied VR. The documentary nominated for a Canadian Screen Award for Best Immersive Experience.
