= Iskatewizaagegan 39 Independent First Nation =

Ojibwa/Anishinaabe First Nation

Coordinates: 49.653°N 95.098°W

Iskatewizaagegan #39 Independent First Nation
- Band No. 154
- People: Ojibwa/Anishinaabe
- Headquarters: Kejick, Ontario

Land
- Other reserves: Agency 30; Shoal Lake 34B2; Shoal Lake 39; Shoal Lake 39A

Population (2022)
- On reserve: 340
- On other land: 31
- Off reserve: 327
- Total population: 698

Government
- Chief: Gerald Lewis
- Council: Aldora Fair; Barbara Kejick; James Mandamin; Kristen Mandamin

Tribal Council
- Bimose Tribal Council

Website
- shoallake39.ca

Iskatewizaagegan #39 Independent First Nation (IIFN #39), also known as Shoal Lake #39 (Ojibwe: Iskatewi-zaaga'iganiing 39), is an Ojibwa/Anishinaabe First Nation that is part of the Bimose Tribal Council and subsequently part of Grand Council Treaty 3. It is located along the northwestern shores of Shoal Lake, Ontario, 16 km (9.9 mi) south of Ontario Highway 673.

Four reserves are attached to this First Nation:

- Agency 30, shared with 12 other First Nations
- Shoal Lake 34B2, shared with Shoal Lake 40 First Nation
- Shoal Lake 39, partly located in Manitoba adjacent to the north of Shoal Lake
- Shoal Lake 39A, IIFN 39's most populous reserve, northwest of Lake of the Woods

== Governance ==
As of December 2022, the band's total registered population is 698, of which 340 live on its own reserves. Their current Chief, Gerald Lewis, was first elected in March 2016, and has served 4 two-year terms, with his most recent election being in March 2022.

Shoal Lake 39 is a member of the Bimose Tribal Council.

== Water treatment ==
In April 2008, Chief Eli Mandamin complained that the sewage treatment plant built for the Shoal Lake 39 community in 2000 had no running water to help maintain cleanliness, and that other problems with the plant could lead to a complete shut-down, resulting in raw sewage entering the lake from which Winnipeg has been drawing its drinking water since 1919.

In June 2009, Chief Mandamin and some community members demonstrated on Trans-Canada Highway 17 near their home reserve, to show their grievances with a highway-twinning project planned by the Ontario government. They also expressed frustration with the fact that the City of Winnipeg has never made an agreement with Shoal Lake 39 regarding the water that is drawn from Shoal Lake to service Winnipeg citizens, although the adjacent Shoal Lake 40 First Nation did have an agreement settled in 1989.

In 2011, Shoal Lake 39 voiced its concern over the plans for the City of Winnipeg to sell its water to outlying communities. As that water originates in Shoal Lake, near the reserves of Shoal Lake 39, the First Nation sought monetary compensation, or other equivalent forms of redress, for the hardships they have endured over the years. The water taken out of Shoal Lake for the Greater Winnipeg Water District Aqueduct has required artificial maintenance of lake levels, leading to loss of fishing and wild rice resources, among other difficulties arising from the loss of sovereignty over the land and water. The leaders of the band threatened to cut off the Winnipeg water supply by blocking the aquatic entrance to Shoal Lake. The neighboring Shoal Lake 40 First Nation stated that they were not willing to take such drastic measures in achieving their objectives before negotiating with various levels of government.

Shoal Lake 39 then took the matter of Winnipeg's water usage to the Manitoba Court of Queen's Bench. In a legal petition filed on 14 March 2012, the First Nation asked the court to set aside a December 2011 decision by the City of Winnipeg to enter into service-sharing agreements, including one nearing completion with West St. Paul. Shoal Lake 39 also wants the court to order the city to refrain from any more negotiations until it reaches an agreement with the First Nation on how the water may be used. This First Nation long maintained that Winnipeg did not obtain its consent as far back as 1919, although Shoal Lake 40 had no such dispute with the city.
