= Shoal Lake 37A =

- Indian reserve
- Shoal Lake Indian Reserve No. 37A
- Location within Canada
- Coordinates: 49°28′N 95°10′W
- Country: Canada
- Provinces: Manitoba, Ontario
- Division / District: Division 1 / Kenora
- First Nation: Animakee Wa Zhing 37

Area
  - Land: 7.77 km^{2} (3.00 sq mi)

Shoal Lake 37A is a First Nations reserve on Shoal Lake straddling the border between Manitoba and Ontario. It is one of the reserves of the Animakee Wa Zhing 37 First Nation.
