= Hillside Beach, Manitoba =

Beach resort in Manitoba, Canada

Coordinates: 50°40′06″N 96°33′49″W

Hillside Beach is a summer resort in the Rural Municipality of Alexander, Manitoba. It is located on the eastern shore of Lake Winnipeg, approximately 95 kilometres (59 mi) from Winnipeg.

Hillside Beach has a two-kilometre sand beach and dunes in a protected bay of Lake Winnipeg, just across from Victoria Beach. The protected bay offers conditions for sailing, surfing, water skiing and fishing. A three-kilometre wide lagoon is located behind the dunes, which is used for fishing, canoeing and birdwatching. Facilities at Hillside Beach include a general store and cafe, a gas station, a realty office and a utility rental shop.

== History ==
Hillside Beach was first promoted as a summer resort in 1913 by a Winnipeg real estate agent, H.W.A. Chambre. Development was initially slow, owing to the lack of railway services to Hillside Beach and the outbreak of World War I in 1914. Access to Hillside Beach improved in 1916, when the Canadian National railway branch line from Winnipeg to Victoria Beach opened. A whistle stop for Hillside Beach visitors was located at the present-day intersection of Highway 59 and Hillside Beach Road. From there, it was an approximately 2-kilometre (1.2 mi) walk to the beach and main cottage area.

A number of lots were sold and cottages built in the early 1920s, which were located in the vicinity of Belfast Avenue, near the beach. These early cottagers included Robert and Hattie Lyons, Mr. and Mrs. Williams, Mr. and Mrs. Cavanaugh, and Alice Wood.

Cottage development would rapidly increase in the years following World War II, particularly as highway access to Hillside Beach improved in the 1950s and 1960s.
