= Manitoba Pioneer Camp =

Coordinates: 49.9381°N 97.0923°W

InterVarsity Pioneer Camp Manitoba
- Interactive map of InterVarsity Pioneer Camp Manitoba
- Location: MacKinnon and Cash Islands, Shoal Lake, Lake of the Woods, Ontario
- Type: Drive in
- Season: May through September
- Operated by: InterVarsity Christian Fellowship of Canada
- Established: 1942
- Website: pioneercampmanitoba.ca

Pioneer Camp Manitoba (PCM) is a summer camp, one of several Pioneer Camps owned and operated by Inter-Varsity Christian Fellowship (IVCF) of Canada. It operates on two islands on Shoal Lake, near Lake of the Woods. It is located just on the Ontarian side of the Manitoba-Ontario border, and is accredited by the Manitoba Camping Association.

== History ==
PCM was founded in 1942 by Stan and Ann Steinman with the financial support of Hugh Lorne MacKinnon, in order to give university students involved with IVCF the opportunity to spend their summer months sharing their Christian faith with children in a wilderness setting. In the late 1950s, staff member Bill Mason developed a canoe-tripping program and designed a canoe instruction curriculum. Over the following decades, under the leadership of directors Gordon Stewart and Hildy Leverton, PCM increasingly specialized in Christian spiritual development through canoe tripping, which remains a key feature of its summer programming.

== Site and facilities ==
Pioneer Manitoba’s primary site is on MacKinnon Island, at the north end of Shoal Lake. The site occupies the island's southwest tip, while the remainder of the 193-acre island is protected wilderness. The site can accommodate 120 people, and features 17 cabins, a dining hall, an outripping centre, staff lodgings, a rental retreat cabin, and several multipurpose buildings, the largest of which is Bill Mason Place.

Pioneer Manitoba operates a secondary site on a peninsula of Cash Island, east of MacKinnon Island. The site can accommodate 40 people, and features 9 open-air cabanas and an A-frame lodge that serves as dining hall and multipurpose space.

== Summer programs ==
MacKinnon Island hosts core summer program of 6-day and 12-day single-gender camps. Girls Camp runs in July and Boys Camp in August. The daily schedule includes canoe and wilderness skill instruction, and optional activities such as swimming, kayaking, archery, field games, and crafts. Cabin groups have two leaders and five to eight campers. All campers go on canoe trips in their cabin groups. The youngest campers go on an overnight trip, while older campers go on trips up to six days long.

Cash Island hosts 5-day and 6-day camp sessions as well as specialty camps such as fishing, sailing, and family camps. Pioneer Manitoba also operates a number of tripping programs, including the 'Challenge' for 15- and 16-year-olds, which centers around a two-week-long whitewater river canoe trip. The Leader In Training program is a month long and includes a whitewater canoe trip and a 12-day MacKinnon Island camp session.

== Other programs ==
In May and June, Pioneer Camp Manitoba runs Outdoor Education programs for school groups. It also operates the outfitting company Wildwise, which leads canoe trips for groups of adults.
