= Rural Municipality of Alexander =

Rural municipality in Manitoba, Canada

Alexander
- Rural municipality
- Rural Municipality of Alexander
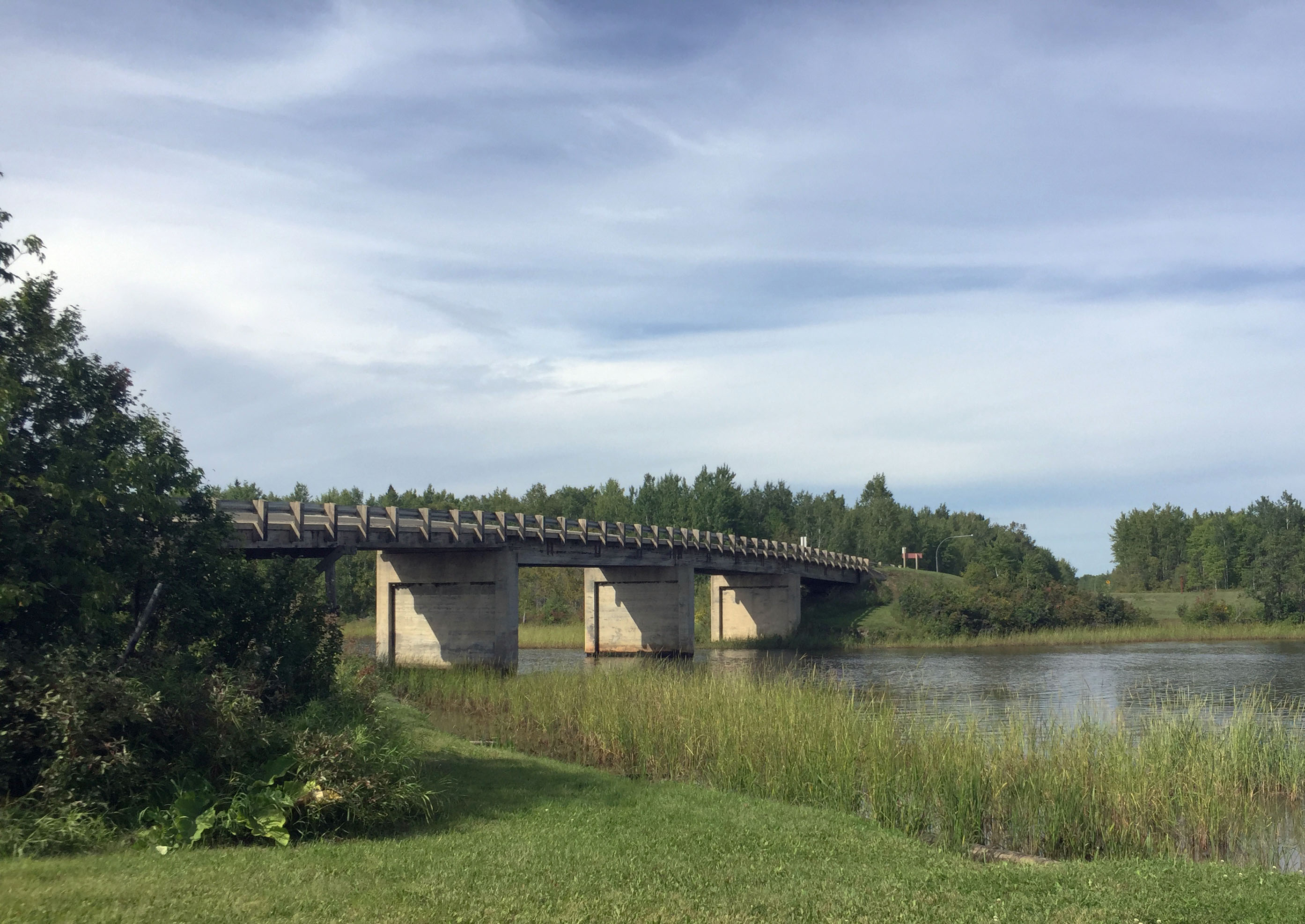

- Location of the Rural Municipality of Alexander in Manitoba
- Coordinates: 50°25′20″N 96°04′30″W
- Country: Canada
- Province: Manitoba
- Incorporated as a LGD: January 1, 1945
- Incorporated as a rural municipality: January 1, 1997

Area
  - Total: 1,560.05 km^{2} (602.34 sq mi)

Population (2021)
  - Total: 3,854
- Time zone: UTC-6 (CST)
  - Summer (DST): UTC-5 (CDT)
- Administrative office: St. Georges
- Website: www.rmalexander.com

The Rural Municipality of Alexander (French: Municipalité rurale d'Alexander) is a rural municipality in the Eastman Region of Manitoba, Canada. The town of Powerview-Pine Falls lies adjacent to the municipality, as does the Sagkeeng First Nation Indian reserve.

The municipality contains all of Manitoba's Belair Provincial Forest in its westernmost part, plus the northern half of Brightstone Sand Hills Provincial Forest in its central part.

== History ==
It was first incorporated as a Local Government District in 1945 and received its present status as a rural municipality on 1 January 1997. Parts of the RM (Great Falls area) had been under a boil water advisory since April 18, 2006, until a $5-million water treatment plant was installed in September 2019.

== Communities ==
Community	Location / Notes	Coordinates
Albert Beach	on the shore of Traverse Bay, Lake Winnipeg	50°40′50″N 96°30′49″W
Belair	between Lester Beach and PTH 59	50°36′20″N 96°33′16″W
Bird River	on the Bird River upstream from Lac du Bonnet	50°24′46″N 95°40′46″W
Great Falls	site of the Great Falls Generating Station on the Winnipeg River	50°27′43″N 96°0′35″W
Gull Lake	on Gull Lake	50°24′22″N 96°31′10″W
Hillside Beach	on Hillside Point on Lake Winnipeg	50°40′6″N 96°33′49″W
Lester Beach	north of Grand Beach Provincial Park on Lake Winnipeg	50°35′9″N 96°34′32″W
Pinawa Bay	on the Lee River	50°19′27″N 95°47′31″W
Poplar Bay	near Poplar Bay Provincial Park on Lac du Bonnet	50°22′27″N 95°46′49″W
St. Georges	on the Winnipeg River, upstream from Fort Alexander	50°32′22″N 96°8′56″W
Silver Falls	site of the Silver Falls Airport and Silver Falls Water Aerodrome	50°30′54″N 96°5′56″W
Stead	on PTH 304	50°25′44″N 96°26′47″W
Sunset Bay	on the Lee River	50°20′27″N 95°48′18″W
Traverse Bay	east of Albert Beach, on Traverse Bay, Lake Winnipeg	50°40′24″N 96°29′8″W
White Mud Falls	on the Winnipeg River downstream from Great Falls	50°28′0″N 96°3′55″W

== Demographics ==
In the 2021 Census of Population conducted by Statistics Canada, Alexander had a population of 3,854 living in 1,845 of its 4,347 total private dwellings, a change of 15.6% from its 2016 population of 3,333. With a land area of 1,560.05 km^{2} (602.34 sq mi), it had a population density of 2.5/km^{2} (6.4/sq mi) in 2021.

== See also ==
- List of francophone communities in Manitoba
