= Buffalo Point First Nation =

- People: Ojibwa or Saulteaux
- Treaty: Treaty 3
- Headquarters: Buffalo Point, Manitoba

Land
- Main reserve: Buffalo Point 36
- Reserves: Reed River 36A; Buffalo Point IR 1; Buffalo Point IR 2; Buffalo Point IR 3; Agency 30

Government
- Chief: John Thunder
- Council: Herman Green; Drew Thunder

Website
- buffalopoint-firstnation.ca

Buffalo Point First Nation is an Ojibwa or Saulteaux First Nations located in the southeastern corner of Manitoba, along the shores of Lake of the Woods. It is bordered largely by the unorganized portion of Division No. 1, Manitoba, and also has smaller borders with the Rural Municipality of Piney, as well as the northeast corner of Roseau County, Minnesota.

The main reserve of Buffalo Point 36 (49°0′59″N 95°15′42″W) contains the resort community of Buffalo Point, Manitoba (49°0′40″N 95°14′20″W).

The First Nation is independent, but was once a member of the Southeast Resource Development Council. Though a signatory to Treaty 3, the First Nation is not a member of the Grand Council of Treaty 3.

== Reserves ==
Buffalo Point 36 Neyaashiing
- Indian reserve
- Location within Manitoba
- Coordinates: 49.016389°N 95.261667°W
- Country: Canada
- Province: Manitoba
- Region: Eastman

Government
  - Type: Band government

Area
  - Land: 16.33 km^{2} (6.31 sq mi)

Population (2016)
  - Total: 481
  - Density: 29.5/km^{2} (76/sq mi)

The First Nation has six reserve lands:

- Buffalo Point 36 (Ojibwe: Neyaashiing) — serves as their main reserve; with a total size of 1,633 hectares (4,040 acres), it contains the resort community of Buffalo Point, Manitoba.
- Reed River 36A — with a total size of 1,161.6 hectares (2,870 acres)
- Buffalo Point First Nation Indian Reserve 1 — total size of 37.4 hectares (92 acres)
- Buffalo Point First Nation Indian Reserve 2 — total size of 347.9 hectares (860 acres)
- Buffalo Point First Nation Indian Reserve 3 — total size of 91.6 hectares (226 acres)
- Agency 30 — a reserve shared with 12 other First Nations; it has a total size of 379 hectares (940 acres) and is located on the Aulneau Peninsula in the Lake of the Woods in Ontario.

== Governance ==
Buffalo Point First Nation is governed by a traditional system of government where the leadership is determined by a traditional, hereditary system. The number of councillors is determined by the federal Crown–Indigenous Relations and Northern Affairs department. The current leadership is Chief John Thunder and two Councillors.

The First Nation is independent, but was once a member of the Southeast Resource Development Council. Though a signatory to Treaty 3, the First Nation is not a member of the Grand Council of Treaty 3.

== Notable citizens ==
- Eddy Cobiness (1933–1996), visual artist
