= Greater Winnipeg Water District Railway =

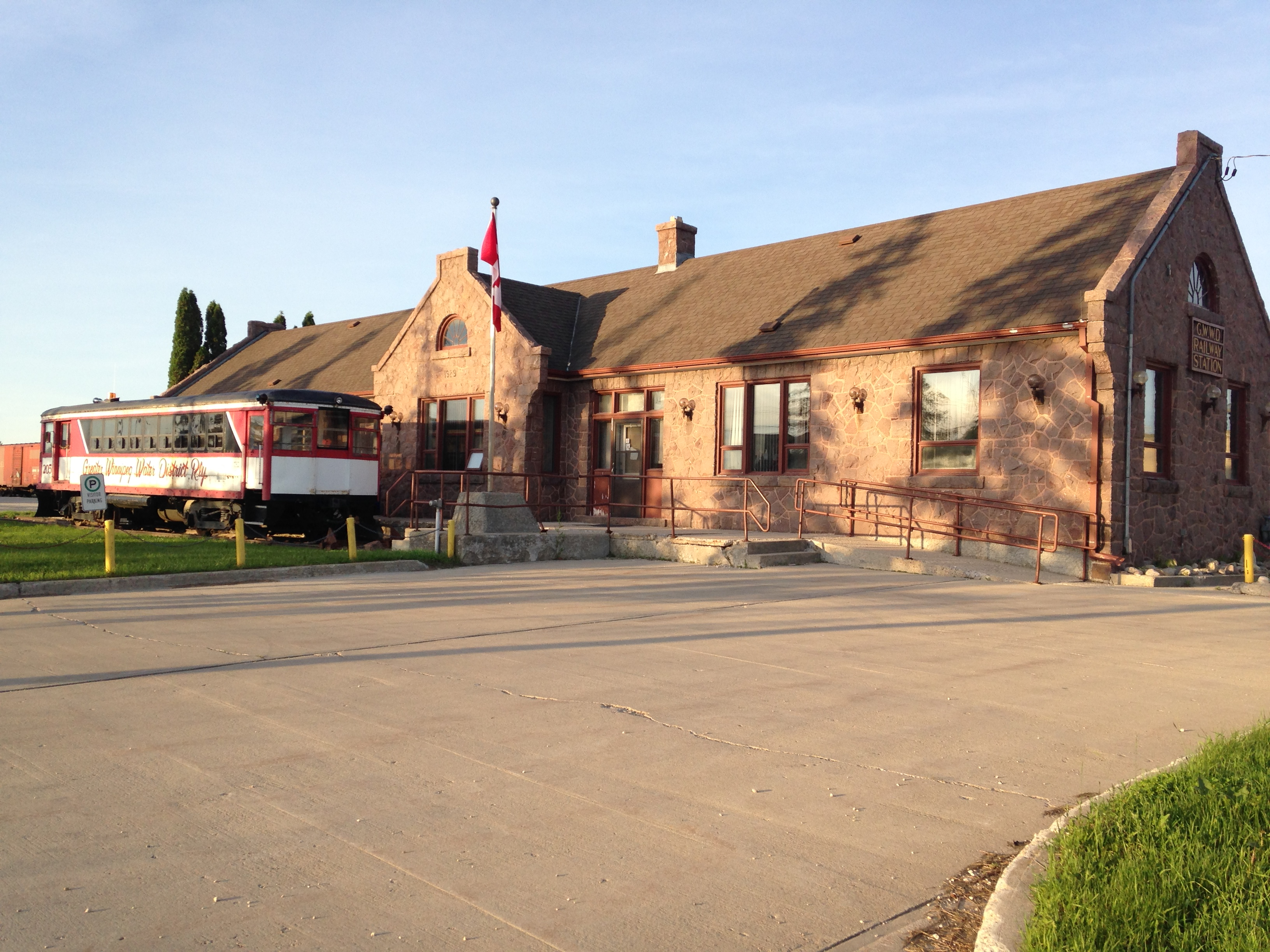
- Greater Winnipeg Water District Railway depot

Overview
- Status: Operational
- Locale: Manitoba, Canada
- Coordinates: West: 49.8927°N 97.1004°W; East: 49.6222°N 95.1972°W
- Termini: Greater Winnipeg Water District Railway depot; City of Winnipeg Shoal Lake Aqueduct

Service
- Type: Freight
- Operator(s): Greater Winnipeg Water District

History
- Opened: 1916
- Completed: 1916

Technical
- Track length: 164 km (102 mi)

The Greater Winnipeg Water District Railway is a 164-kilometre-long (102 mi) industrial railway from Winnipeg, Manitoba, to Waugh on Shoal Lake near Manitoba's eastern boundary. The railway was built between 1914 and 1916 to assist in the construction and maintenance of the aqueduct supplying fresh water to Winnipeg. It is owned by Winnipeg's municipal government.

== History ==
The railway is located 110 feet (34 m) south of the aqueduct linking Winnipeg to Shoal Lake. After the aqueduct was completed in 1919, the railway did not shut down. Instead, the railway started hauling timber for firewood and paper mills as well as gravel for construction. In addition, the line began moving rock from various railway-dug quarries along the line.

The railway carried passenger traffic in its early years. Initially, three trains per week carried workers and materials to areas where rail was still being laid. The line was also used by settlers to and from St. Boniface and by home or cottage owners in southeastern Manitoba. The primary cargo was gravel and firewood for the Winnipeg market; the firewood market especially was booming by 1935. Later, the train carried lumber to pulp and paper mills. Passenger service was profitable into the early 1960s. The railway discontinued mixed trains, carrying both freight and passengers, in 1981 and today is freight-only.

Gravel trains were discontinued in 1992, when a concrete manufacturer, Supercrete, shut down its pit at Ross, Manitoba.

In 2013, Winnipeg officials folded the railway's operations into the city's Water and Waste Department. As a result, the railway has been assigned the task of maintaining and providing security for the aqueduct. It also takes workers and supplies needed for the aqueduct and hauls supplies to the water intake facility at Shoal Lake, returning with contaminated materials.

== Physical plant ==
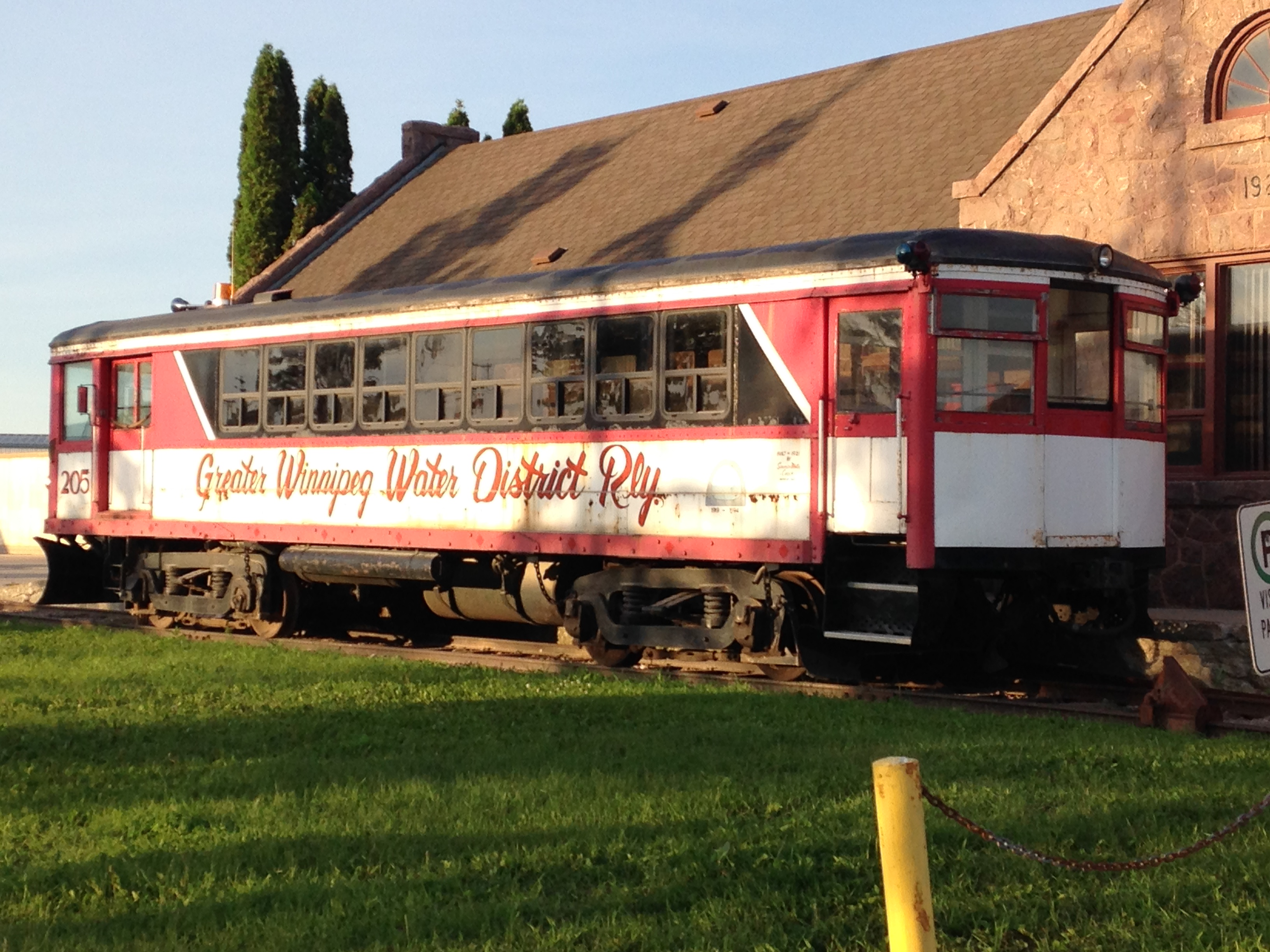
Closeup of rail car

The GWWD Winnipeg terminal and facilities are located at 598 Plinguet Street in St. Boniface. The railway's offices are housed in a former passenger depot, although the GWWD no longer operates passenger trains.

== See also ==
- American Water Landmark – the Winnipeg Aqueduct, Greater Winnipeg Water District (awarded in 1985).
