= Great Falls Dam (Manitoba) =

Great Falls Generating Station
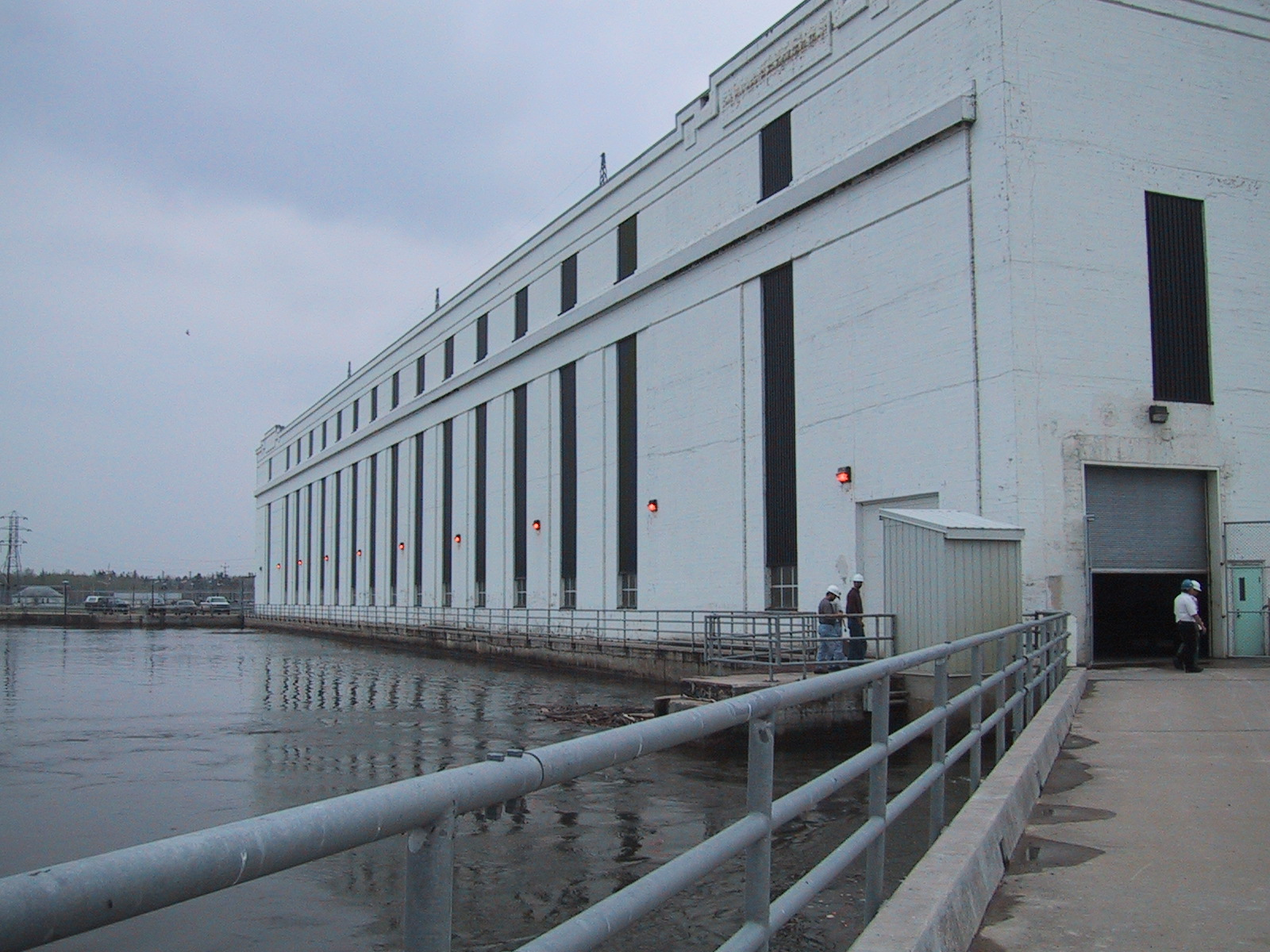
- Powerhouse of the Great Falls Generating Station, upstream side.

- Location within Manitoba
- Interactive map of Great Falls Generating Station
- Country: Canada
- Location: Rural Municipality of Alexander
- Coordinates: 50.46278°N 96.00694°W
- Construction began: 1914
- Opening date: 1928
- Owner: Manitoba Hydro

Dam and spillways
- Impounds: Winnipeg River

Power Station
- Installed capacity: 130 megawatts

Great Falls Generating Station is a hydroelectric dam on the Winnipeg River approximately 130 kilometres northeast of Winnipeg in the Rural Municipality of Alexander in the Canadian province of Manitoba.

The dam is owned and operated by Manitoba Hydro, and has a generating capacity of 130 megawatts. The Winnipeg Electric Railway Company began building the dam in 1914. First power was delivered in 1922, and the construction was completed in 1928.

In the fiscal year ending 31 March 2016, Great Falls contributed 2.31% of all generation in Manitoba, about 840 gigawatt-hours.
