= Obashkaandagaang Bay First Nation =

Ojibwe First Nation in Ontario, Canada

Coordinates: 49°42′51.07″N 94°35′6.27″W

O"Bash'Kaan'Da'Gaang/Washagamis Bay First Nation is an Ojibwe First Nation in northwestern Ontario, Canada. Before the signing of Treaty 3 agreement there were three Anishinabe tribes living near and around the Kenora region. The smallest was Washagamis Bay, formerly O'Bash'Kaan'Da'Gaang(38A), the second was Niisaachewaan (Dalles-38C) and the largest was Wauzhusk Onigum (Rat Portage-38B). It has two reserves; Agency 30 and Rat Portage near Kenora. It is a member of the Bimose Tribal Council and the Grand Council of Treaty 3.
