= Shoal Lake 40 =

- Indian reserve
- Shoal Lake Indian Reserve No. 40
- Location within Canada
- Coordinates: 49°37′N 95°09′W
- Country: Canada
- Provinces: Ontario, Manitoba
- District / Division: Kenora / Division 1
- First Nation: Shoal Lake 40

Area
  - Land: 26.21 km^{2} (10.12 sq mi)

Population (2011)
  - Total: 101
  - Density: 3.9/km^{2} (10/sq mi)
- Website: www.shoallake40.ca

Shoal Lake 40 is a First Nations reserve straddling the border of Manitoba and Ontario on the shores of Shoal Lake. It is one of the reserves of the Shoal Lake 40 First Nation.
