= Shoal Lake 39A =

- Indian reserve
- Shoal Lake Indian Reserve No. 39A
- Location within Canada
- Coordinates: 49°39′N 95°05′W
- Country: Canada
- Provinces: Ontario, Manitoba
- District / Division: Kenora / Division 1
- First Nation: Iskatewizaagegan 39

Area
  - Land: 34.33 km^{2} (13.25 sq mi)

Population (2011)
  - Total: 388
  - Density: 11.3/km^{2} (29/sq mi)

Shoal Lake 39A is a First Nations reserve straddling the border of Manitoba and Ontario on the shores of Shoal Lake. It is one of the reserves of the Iskatewizaagegan 39 Independent First Nation.
