= Lee River Wildlife Management Area =

Wildlife management area in Manitoba, Canada

Coordinates: 50.2222°N 95.9868°W

- IUCN category IV (habitat/species management area)
- Interactive map of Lee River Wildlife Management Area
- Area: 3,350 ha (12.9 sq mi)
- Established: 2000

Lee River Wildlife Management Area is a wildlife management area located east of Lac du Bonnet, Manitoba, Canada. It was established in 1997 under the Manitoba Wildlife Act. Initially the WMA was 1,187 hectares (4.58 sq mi) in size. In 2000, the WMA was protected to Endangered Spaces standards as part of Manitoba’s Protected Areas Initiative. It is 33.5 square kilometres (12.9 sq mi) in size.

Lee River Wildlife Management Area is within the Boreal Shield Ecozone.

== See also ==
- List of wildlife management areas in Manitoba
- List of protected areas of Manitoba
