= Shoal Lake (Kenora District, Ontario) =

- Ojibwe: Iskatewi-zaagaʼigan
- Location within Ontario Location within Manitoba
- Location: Northwestern Ontario (Kenora District), Southeast Manitoba (Eastman Region)
- Coordinates: 49°32′50″N 94°56′25″W
- Type: Lake
- Part of: Lake of the Woods
- Basin countries: Canada
- Surface area: 320 km^{2} (80,000 acres)
- Settlements: Shoal Lake #39 First Nation, Shoal Lake 40 First Nation

Shoal Lake (Ojibwe: Iskatewi-zaagaʼigan) is a lake that straddles the boundary between Ontario and Manitoba, Canada, northwest of the Lake of the Woods. Depending on the water level of Lake of the Woods, Shoal Lake runs both a tributary and distributary of Lake of the Woods and, for many practical purposes, is part of that lake.

There are two First Nations peoples, both Ojibwe, who lay claim to much of Shoal Lake: Iskatewizaagegan 39 Independent First Nation (Shoal Lake First Nation #39) and Shoal Lake 40 First Nation.

== Overview ==
Shoal Lake is in the Eastman Region of Manitoba and the Kenora District of Ontario, northwest of Lake of the Woods. It spans approximately 29 km (18 mi) from north to south and 40 km (25 mi) from east to west.

Smallmouth bass, northern pike, and walleye are its primary species of fish. At one time, it was a commercial fishery for walleye, but this was closed due to overfishing.

There are a number of private cabins in this area, and several commercial fishing lodges and resorts which offer housekeeping cabins and American-plan packages for tourists.

The lake has a history of gold mining and as gold prices rise so does the pressure to explore mining of the lake again. This pressure is being fought by local cottagers and the City of Winnipeg, which has used the lake as its main source of safe drinking water for almost 100 years. Shoal Lake falls under special and specific developmental guidelines in order to protect its water quality and unique wildlife.

== Manitoba ==
In the Manitoba portion, Shoal Lake is a large isolated lake in the southeastern corner of the province.

Shoal Lake 40 First Nation, Ojibwe peoples, who are in the Eastman Region of Manitoba and the Kenora District of Ontario, is one of the First Nations that lays claim to the lake.

Shoal Lake is also home to Manitoba Pioneer Camp.

=== Winnipeg's drinking water ===
The City of Winnipeg has relied on the lake as its source for safe drinking water since 1919, supplied via the Greater Winnipeg Water District Aqueduct.

Before it is treated, water from Shoal Lake is stored in Deacon Reservoir, on the east side of the Winnipeg floodway, a few kilometres south of Highway 15.

Access by maintenance staff to the Aqueduct has been provided by the Greater Winnipeg Water District Railway, operated by the City, since 1916. The Railway formerly provided passenger and freight rail services to the public, from Winnipeg to the rail station at the Shoal Lake aqueduct intake.

==== Greater Winnipeg Water District ====
The Greater Winnipeg Water District (GWWD) was established in 1913 as a collaboration between the City of Winnipeg and its neighbouring municipalities, who decided to invest CA$13.5 million to access Shoal Lake.

Winnipeg Mayor Thomas R. Deacon spearheaded making Shoal Lake the city's water source, a project he had supported long before becoming mayor in 1913. In January 1913, a series of meetings was held between Winnipeg and the municipalities, who reached an agreement on draft legislation to form a water district.

On February 15 that year, An Act to incorporate the ‘Greater Winnipeg Water District,’ was passed by the Manitoba Legislature. The areas included in the district were the City of Winnipeg, City of St. Boniface, Town of Transcona, and Rural Municipality of St. Vital, as well as a part of the Rural Municipality of Fort Garry, the Rural Municipality of Assiniboia, and the Rural Municipality of Kildonan.

The GWWD was eventually succeeded by the City of Winnipeg Water and Waste Department.

== See also ==
- List of lakes in Ontario
