= Lake of the Woods =

Lake on the United States–Canada border

- Lac des Bois; Babiikwaawangaa-zaagaʼigan
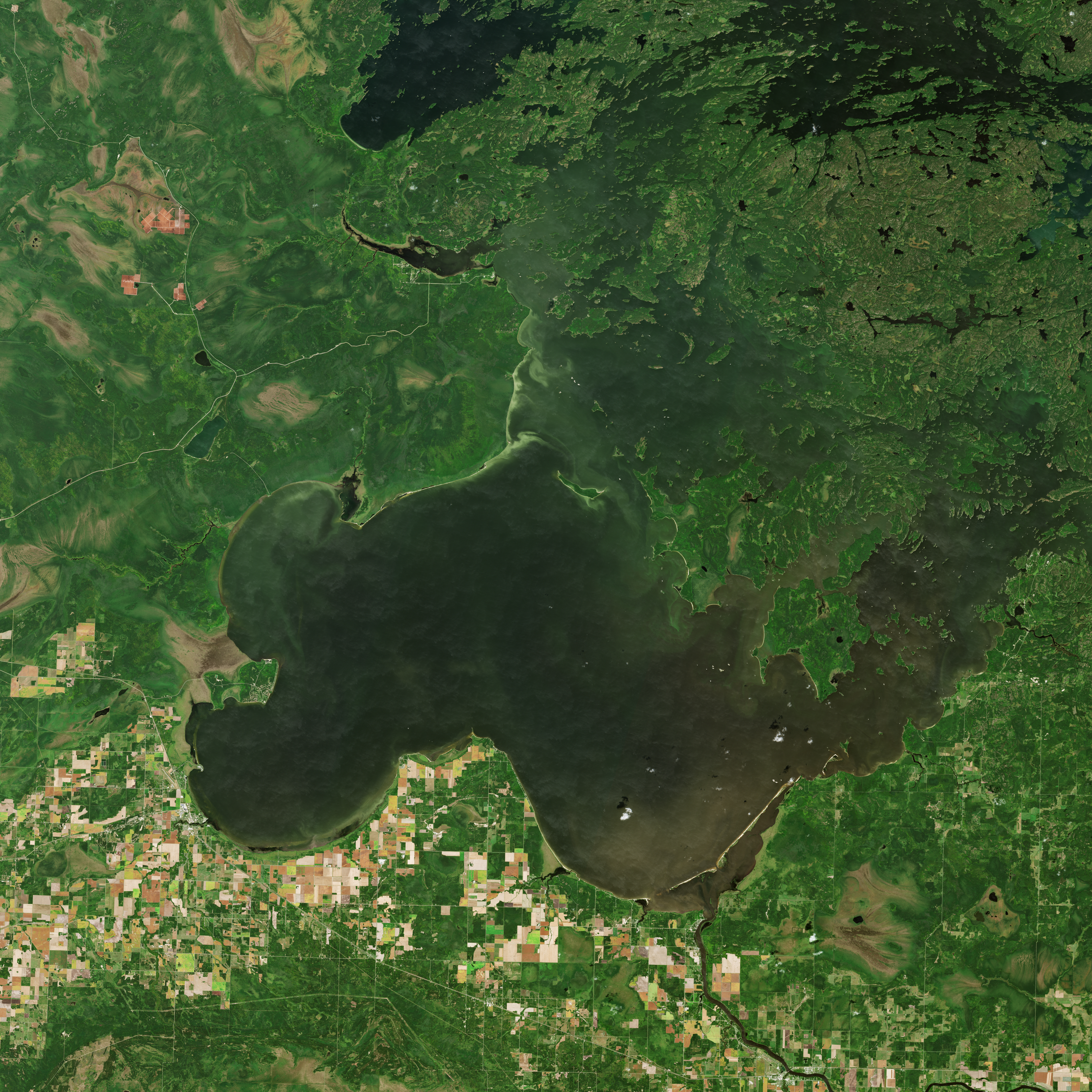
- Lake of the Woods from space, September 2018

- Location within Manitoba Location within Ontario Location within Minnesota
- Location: North America
- Coordinates: 49°14′59″N 94°45′03″W
- Lake type: Glacial
- Primary inflows: Rainy River; Shoal Lake; Kakagi Lake
- Primary outflows: Winnipeg River
- Basin countries: Canada and United States
- Max. length: 68 mi (109 km)
- Max. width: 59 mi (95 km)
- Surface area: 4,350 km^{2} (1,679.5 sq mi)
- Max. depth: 210 ft (64 m)
- Shore length^{1}: excluding islands: 25,000 mi (40,000 km); including islands: 65,000 mi (105,000 km)
- Surface elevation: 323 m (1,060 ft)
- Islands: 14,632
- Settlements: Angle Inlet, Minnesota; Warroad, Minnesota; Kenora, Ontario; Sioux Narrows-Nestor Falls, Ontario; Lake of the Woods, Ontario
- ^{1} Shore length is not a well-defined measure.

Lake of the Woods (French: lac des Bois; Ojibwe: Babiikwaawangaa-zaagaʼigan) is a lake occupying parts of the Canadian provinces of Ontario and Manitoba and the U.S. state of Minnesota. Lake of the Woods is over 70 miles (110 km) long and wide, containing more than 14,552 islands and 65,000 miles (105,000 km) of shoreline. It is fed by the Rainy River, Shoal Lake, Kakagi Lake and other smaller rivers. The lake drains into the Winnipeg River and then into Lake Winnipeg. Ultimately, its outflow goes north through the Nelson River to Hudson Bay.

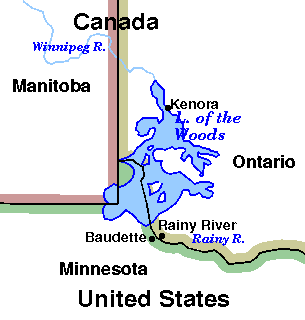

Lake of the Woods is also the sixth largest freshwater lake located (at least partially) in the United States, after the five Great Lakes, and the 35th largest lake in the world by area. It separates a small land area of Minnesota from the rest of the United States. The Northwest Angle and Angle Township can be reached from the rest of Minnesota only by crossing the lake or by traveling through Canada. The Northwest Angle is the northernmost part of the contiguous United States. Its "northwesternmost point" served as a problematic landmark in treaties defining the international border.

The lake's islands provide nesting habitats for the piping plover and large numbers of American white pelicans and as recently as the early 20th century also provided calving habitat to boreal woodland caribou. There are also several hundred nesting pairs of bald eagles in this area.

Lake of the Woods, a calque of the original French name lac des Bois, was so named from its wooded setting. However, it may have been a mistranslation of the Anishinaabe name.

The earliest name we find the lake known by is that given by Verendrye in his journey in 1731. He says it was called Lake Minitic (Cree: ministik; Ojibwe: minitig) or Des Bois. (1) The former of these names, Minitic, seems to be Anishinaabe, and to mean "Islands in a River", probably referring to the many islands found in the northern half of the lake. The other name (2) Lac des Bois, or Lake of the Woods, seems to have been a mistranslation of the Indian name (Anishinaabe) by which the Lake was known.

One of the names currently used in Anishinaabe for this lake is Babiikwaawangaa-zaagaʼigan meaning "Lake with Uneven Sand" referring to the lake's sand dunes.

== Governance ==
The construction of dams at the Lake of the Woods outlets in present-day Kenora in the late 19th century led to concerns over high and low water levels on the lake early in the 20th century. The federal governments of Canada and the United States referred the matter to the International Joint Commission (IJC) in 1912. In 1917 the IJC recommended the creation of control boards and the operating conditions they would apply to lake level management. The first of these boards, the Lake of the Woods Control Board (LWCB), was established by Canadian Order-in-Council in 1919. Two additional acts provided statutory establishment of the LWCB, defined its jurisdiction and powers, and provided for board members appointed by Canada and Ontario: the Lake of the Woods Control Board Act, Canada, 1921, the Lake of the Woods Control Board Act, Ontario, 1922. In 1922, the Canada-Ontario-Manitoba Tripartite Agreement was signed by the respective governments. Initially, only Canada and Ontario appointed members to the board as, at that time, natural resources in Manitoba were administered by Canada. In 1958, having gained control over its natural resources, Manitoba passed its own Lake of the Woods Control Board Act. That same year, Canada and Ontario amended their original versions of the acts. As a result of these legislative changes, the LWCB now has one member appointed by Canada, two appointed by Ontario, and one appointed by Manitoba.

Following the IJC recommendations of 1917, discussions between the federal governments of Canada and the United States resulted in the 1925 Canada/USA Convention and Protocol regarding Lake of the Woods. This treaty established the water level operating range on Lake of the Woods, defined the purpose and general mode of operation, and provided for two boards to control regulation. The previously established Canadian LWCB was to regulate the lake on an ongoing basis, but its decisions were to be subject to approval by an International Lake of the Woods Control Board (ILWCB) whenever lake levels rose above or fell below certain limits. In cases where agreement could not be reached between Canadian and American members of the international board, the disputed matter would be referred to the IJC for the final decision. The International Lake of the Woods Control Board, however, is not a board created by the IJC. The board's members (one American and one Canadian) are appointed by the respective federal governments.

Shoal Lake is adjacent to the Lake of the Woods and is the source for the City of Winnipeg drinking water via the Greater Winnipeg Water District Aqueduct, so the administration of the lake is of continuing interest to the governments of Winnipeg and Manitoba.

== Communities near Lake of the Woods ==
=== Ontario ===
- Northwest Angle 33 First Nation
- Big Grassy First Nation
- French Portage Narrows
- Kenora
- Minaki
- Lake of the Woods
- Anishnaabeg of Naongashiing First Nation
- Naotkamegwanning First Nation
- Sioux Narrows-Nestor Falls
- Obashkaandagaang Bay First Nation
- Niisaachewan Anishinaabe Nation
- Ojibways of Onigaming First Nation
- Rainy River
- Northwest Angle 37 First Nation
- Anishinabe of Wauzhushk Onigum First Nation

=== Manitoba ===
- Middlebro
- Buffalo Point First Nation

=== Minnesota ===
- Angle Township
- Hackett
- Baudette
- Warroad
- Wheeler's Point

== Lands within Lake of the Woods ==
=== Aulneau Peninsula ===
The largest land feature in Lake of the Woods is the Aulneau Peninsula. It is connected to the mainland with a tiny neck of land at its southeast corner, but a canal (Turtle Portage 49.1972528°N 94.1239568°W) was cut through at this point, effectively making the Aulneau an island. The canal has now been filled back in. A manually run portage for small- to medium-sized boats is in its place. The Aulneau is approximately twenty miles long (32 km) and ten miles (16 km) wide. It contains within it over eighty lakes, the largest of which is Arrow Lake, with thirteen islands in it.

The Aulneau Peninsula was named after the Jesuit Father Jean-Pierre Aulneau, a French Catholic priest, who was killed by natives on 8 June 1736 on Lake of the Woods. The Catholic Church in Warroad, Minnesota, is named Father Aulneau Memorial Church in his honour.

=== Other islands ===
- Big Island
- Bigsby Island
- Brush Island, Minnesota
- Chapel Island An island about 15 km out from Kenora, where a chapel once stood. When the natives would canoe from end to end for purposes of trading, Chapel Island was a rest stop where the white settlers would try to convert the Native population, and offered a refuge in bad weather. The chapel has since burnt down, and little remains.
- Copeland Island, otherwise known as Camp Stephens. A Winnipeg YM-YWCA summer camp.
- Flag Island, Minnesota
- Garden Island, Minnesota
- Little Oak Island, Minnesota
- Magnuson's Island, site of the restored Fort St. Charles
- Massacre Island, Ontario a small island in the middle of the lake, the possible site where twenty French men, as well as a group of Cree traders, were beheaded in the mid 18th century by Sioux. The site is marked by a large wooden cross in the middle of the island. This incident sparked decades of war between the Sioux and the Ojibway, allies of both the French and the Cree.
- Oak Island, Minnesota
- Penasse Island, site of American Point, formerly the most northern post office in the contiguous United States
- Sultana Mine, a mine on an island in the northern area of the lake in the late 1800s, before an accident shut down the mine. Stories about it being haunted by miners exist to this day.

== Recreation on Lake of the Woods ==
Tourism is a large part of the local economy of Lake of the Woods, and there are many recreational opportunities available on the lake and in the surrounding countryside. Much of the lake is fairly remote, but resorts and equipment outfitters offer options for those who do not have access to their own boats and equipment.

Several parks are located in and on the lake, including:

- Lake of the Woods Provincial Park
- Assabaska Heritage Park
- Sable Islands Provincial Nature Reserve

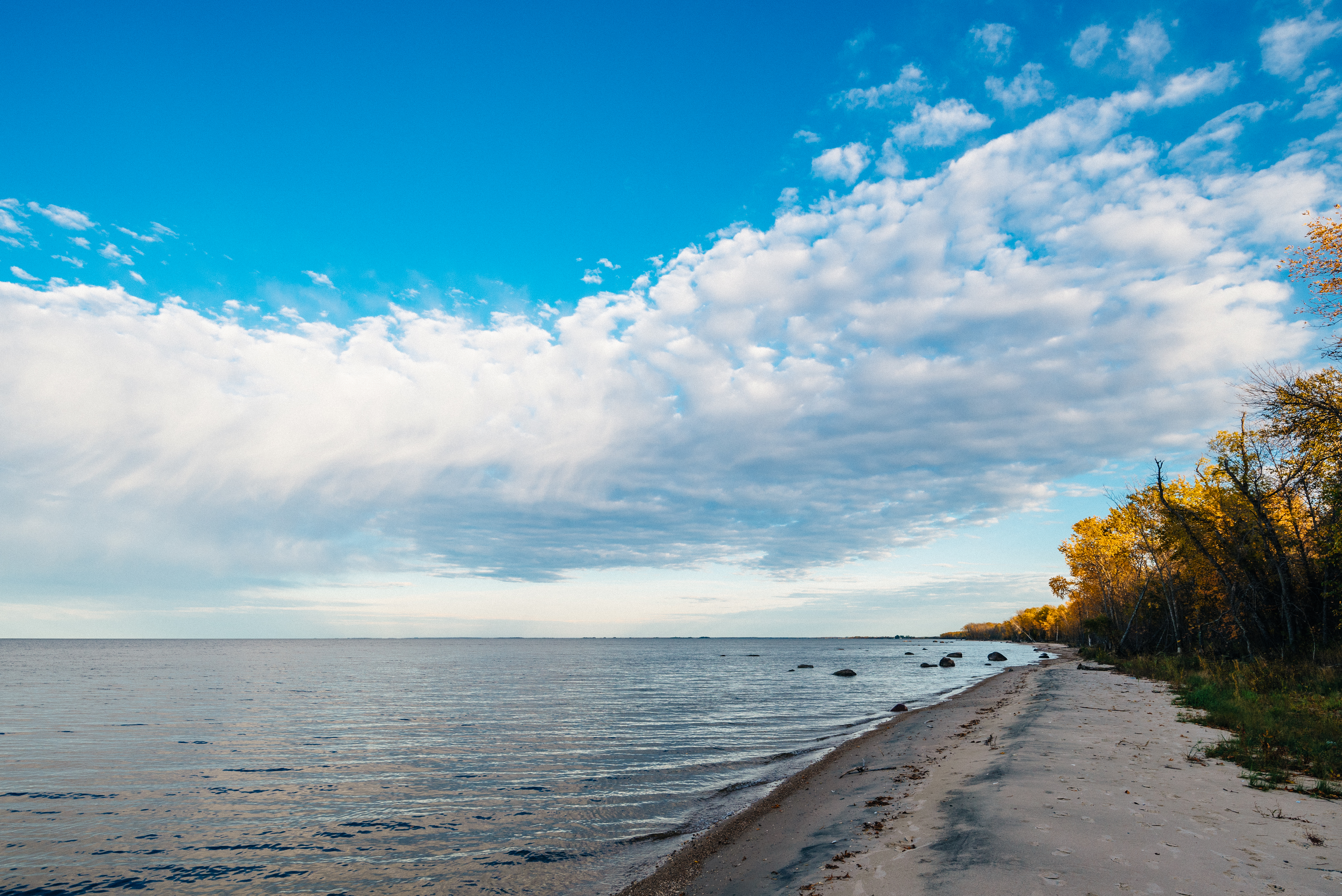
Beach at Zippel Bay State Park

=== Camping ===
Minnesota's Zippel Bay State Park offers a wide variety of services including campsites, toilet facilities, a marina with access to the Zippel River, and a beach. Minnesota and Ontario both offer state-sanctioned parks and campsites, which can be located through the respective governments. Backcountry campers can locate a prospective campsite on Lake of the Woods by boat, landing and examine the site in person. There is abundant wildlife even on the small islands on the lake.

Numerous marinas and resorts on the lake provide accommodation and dining, houseboat rentals, nautical charts, camping and fishing advice, and knowledge on how to most enjoy the lake.

=== Fishing ===
Lake of the Woods is home to walleye, northern pike, perch, sauger, crappie, panfish, smallmouth bass, largemouth bass, lake trout, lake sturgeon, and muskellunge. Lake of the Woods is nicknamed the "Walleye capital of the world". The lake is the host of year-round fishing, with ice fishing being a popular recreation activity on the lake.

=== Royal Lake of the Woods Yacht Club ===
Lake of the Woods is also home to the Royal Lake of the Woods Yacht Club.

== See also ==
- List of lakes of Minnesota
- List of lakes of Ontario
- List of lakes of Manitoba
- Canada–United States border
- Boundary Commission Trail
- Northwestern point of the Lake of the Woods
- List of areas disputed by Canada and the United States
- Lake Agassiz
