= Kenora District =

- District
- Location of Kenora District in Ontario
- Coordinates: 54°N 89°W
- Country: Canada
- Province: Ontario
- Region: Northwestern Ontario
- Created: 1907

Government
  - MPs: Eric Melillo (CPC), Gaétan Malette (CPC), Patty Hajdu (LPC)
  - MPPs: Greg Rickford (PC), Guy Bourgouin (NDP), Sol Mamakwa (NDP)

Area
  - Land: 395,432.07 km^{2} (152,677.18 sq mi)
- Highest elevation: 505 m (1,657 ft)
- Lowest elevation: 0 m (0 ft)

Population (2021)
  - Total: 66,000
  - Density: 0.2/km^{2} (0.52/sq mi)

Time zones
- West of 90° west: UTC-6 (Central (CST))
  - Summer (DST): UTC-5 (Central Daylight (CDT))
- East of 90° west: UTC-5 (Eastern (EST))
  - Summer (DST): UTC-4 (Eastern Daylight (EDT))
- Pickle Lake/ Mishkeegogamang: UTC-5 (Eastern (EST))
- Postal Code FSA: P0V, P0X, P0Y, P8N, P8T, P9N
- Area code: 807
- Largest communities: Kenora (15,177); Dryden (8,195); Sioux Lookout (5,183)

Kenora District is a district and census division in Northwestern Ontario, Canada. The district seat is the City of Kenora.

It is geographically the largest division in Ontario: at 407,213.01 square kilometres (157,225.82 sq mi), it covers 38 percent of the province's area, making it larger than Newfoundland and Labrador, and slightly smaller than Sweden or roughly the land size of California. Kenora District also has the lowest population density of any of Ontario's census divisions (it ranks 37th out of 50 by total population).

The district was created in 1907 from parts of Rainy River District. The northern part (north of the Albany River) only became part of Ontario in 1912 (transferred from the Northwest Territories). The separate Patricia District upon transfer, it was in 1937 annexed to Kenora District and known sometimes as the Patricia Portion.

== Politics ==
As with the other districts of Northern Ontario, the Kenora District does not have an organized government like those of counties or regional municipalities in Southern Ontario. All government services in the district are instead provided by the local municipalities, by local services boards in some unincorporated communities, or directly by the provincial government.

== Geography ==
The climate is very harsh because of the influence of the cold waters of Hudson and James Bays: most of the region is taiga characterized by discontinuous permafrost, but on the extreme northern coast there are – remarkably for a latitude of only 54°N – patches of true Arctic tundra and continuous permafrost. This is the southernmost point in the Northern Hemisphere reached by the circumpolar line of continuous permafrost on any continent.

Kenora District is geographically extensive enough to share borders with both the contiguous United States (the boundary between it and the Northwest Angle is located in the Lake of the Woods) and the Canadian Arctic waters (Hudson Bay), the only district in Canada to do so.

The District contains the Sturgeon Lake Caldera, which is one of the world's best preserved Neoarchean caldera complexes and is some 2.7 billion years old.

=== Subdivisions ===
Cities:

- Dryden
- Kenora

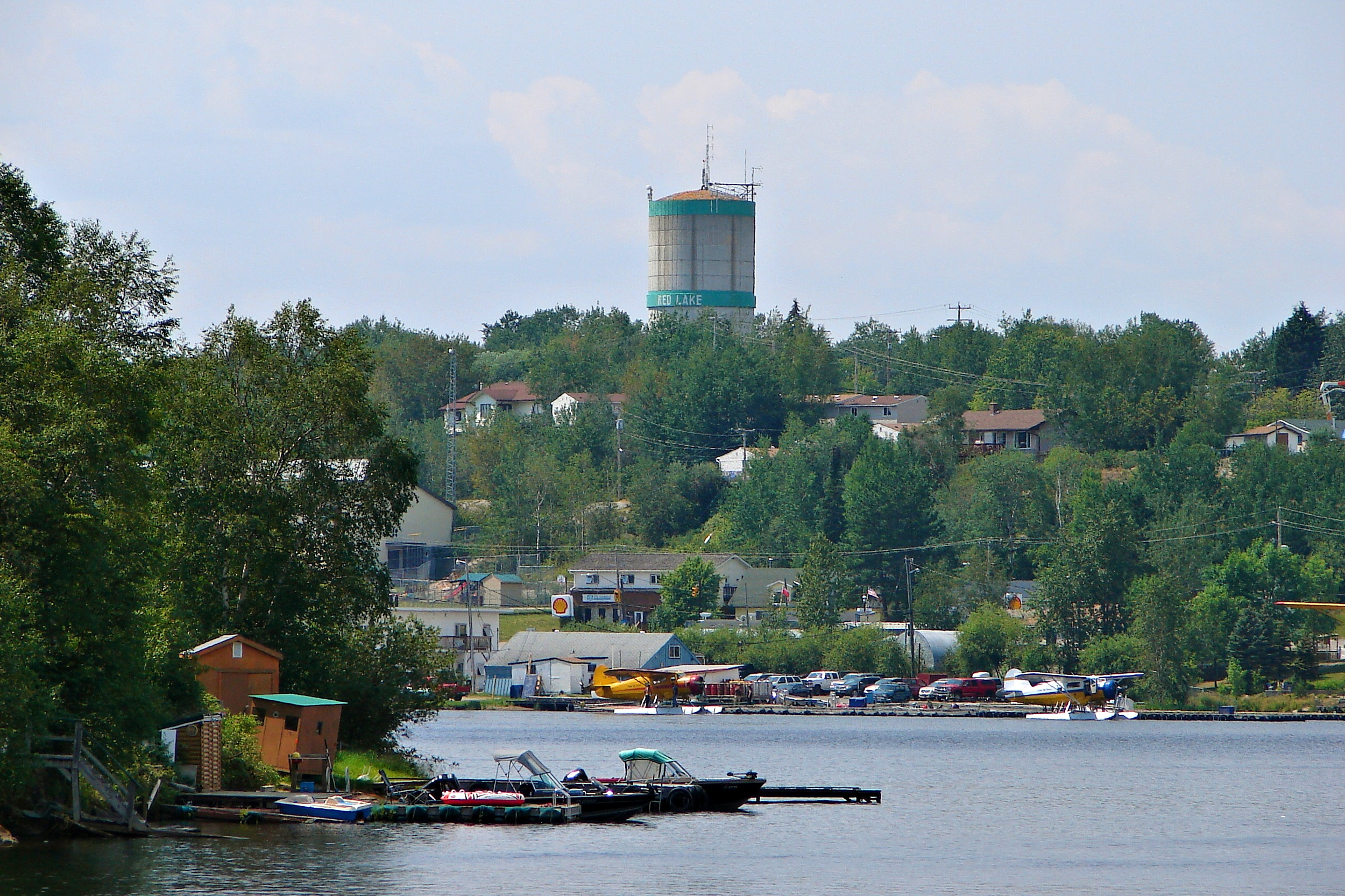
Red Lake, Ontario

Towns:

- Red Lake
- Sioux Lookout

Townships:

- Ear Falls
- Ignace
- Machin
- Pickle Lake
- Sioux Narrows-Nestor Falls

Unorganized areas:

- Kenora, Unorganized (including the local services boards of Greater Oxdrift, Melgund, Minaki, Redditt, Round Lake, and Wabigoon)

=== First Nations reserves ===
- Attawapiskat
- Bearskin Lake
- Cat Lake
- Deer Lake
- Eabametoong
- Eagle Lake 27
- English River 21
- Fort Albany 67 (part)
- Fort Severn 89
- Islington 29
- Kasabonika
- Keewaywin
- Kenora 38B
- Kingfisher Lake
- Kitchenuhmaykoosib Inninuwug
- Lac Seul
- Lake of the Woods 31G
- Lake of the Woods 37
- Marten Falls
- Mishkeegogamang
- Muskrat Dam Lake
- Neskantaga
- Northwest Angle 33
- North Spirit Lake
- Pikangikum
- Poplar Hill
- Rat Portage 38A
- Sabaskong Bay 35D
- Sachigo Lake
- Sandy Lake
- Shoal Lake 39A (part)
- Shoal Lake 40 (part)
- Shoal Lake 34B2
- The Dalles 38C
- Wabauskang 21
- Wabaseemoong Independent Nations
- Wabigoon Lake
- Wapekeka
- Wawakapewin
- Weagamow Lake 87
- Whitefish Bay 32A
- Whitefish Bay 33A
- Whitefish Bay 34A
- Wunnumin Lake

=== Patricia Portion ===
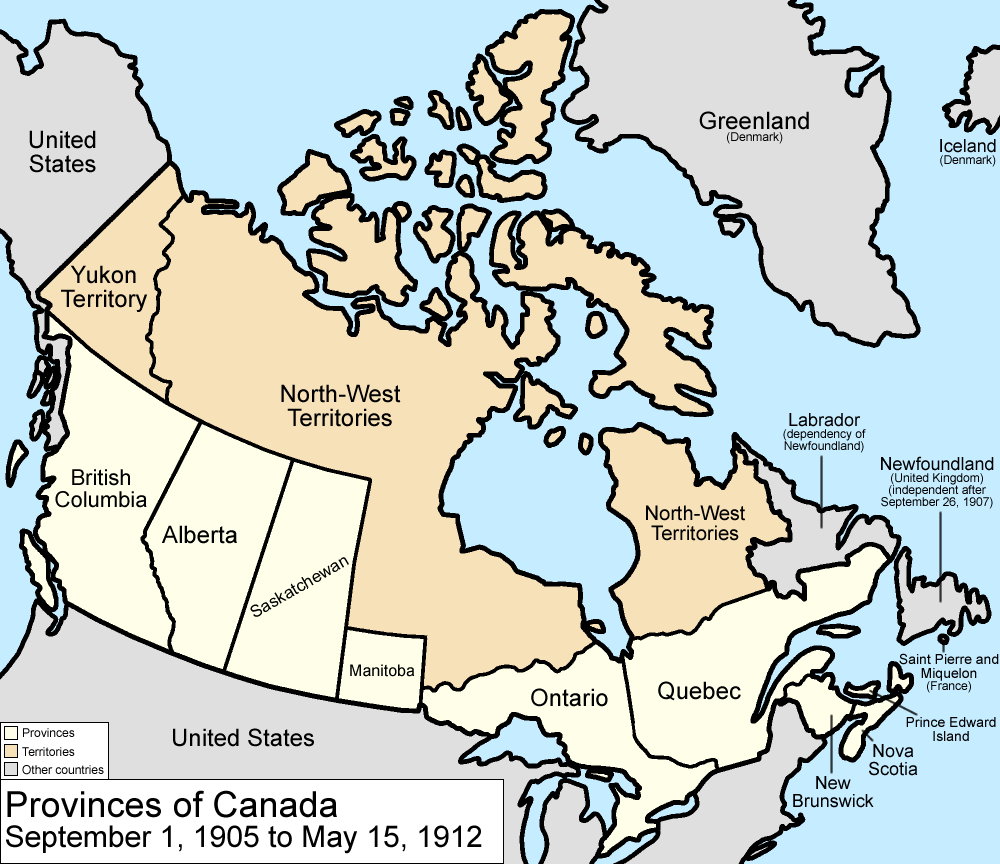
Provincial boundaries of Canada prior to 1912. The portion of Ontario's modern boundaries which is not represented as part of Ontario in this map constitutes the "Patricia Portion" of Kenora District.

The Patricia Portion is the part of the Kenora District lying north of the Albany River, which was transferred from the Northwest Territories to Ontario on May 15, 1912, in The Ontario Boundaries Extension Act. This area was originally a separate division, Patricia District, but became part of Kenora District in 1937.

With the exception of a few communities along the northernmost ends of Highway 599 and the Highway 105/Highway 125 corridor, the Patricia Portion consists almost entirely of remote First Nations communities that are only accessible by float plane or winter road. Accordingly, the term "Patricia Portion" is still sometimes used to distinguish the region from the relatively more populated and road-accessible southern portion.

== Demographics ==
As a census division in the 2021 Census of Population conducted by Statistics Canada, the Kenora District had a population of 66,000 living in 24,818 of its 32,914 total private dwellings, a change of 0.7% from its 2016 population of 65,533. With a land area of 395,432.07 km^{2} (152,677.18 sq mi), it had a population density of 0.2/km^{2} (0.4/sq mi) in 2021.

Canada census – Kenora District community profile

	2021	2016	2011
Population	66,000 (+0.7% from 2016)	65,533 (+13.8% from 2011)	57,607 (−10.6% from 2006)
Land area	395,432.07 km^{2} (152,677.18 sq mi)	407,268.65 km^{2} (157,247.30 sq mi)	407,213.01 km^{2} (157,225.82 sq mi)
Population density	0.2/km^{2} (0.52/sq mi)	0.2/km^{2} (0.52/sq mi)	0.1/km^{2} (0.26/sq mi)
Median age	37.6 (M: 36.8, F: 38.4)	36.5 (M: 35.8, F: 37.1)
Private dwellings	32,914 (total) 24,818 (occupied)	31,191 (total) 23,931 (occupied)	29,606 (total)
Median household income	$78,500	$66,198

Notes: Excludes census data for one or more incompletely enumerated Indian reserves.
References: 2021 2016 2011

Historical census populations – Kenora District

Year	Pop.	±%
1921	19,139	—
1931	25,919	+35.4%
1941	33,372	+28.8%
1951	39,212	+17.5%
1956	47,156	+20.3%
1961	51,474	+9.2%

Year	Pop.	±%
1966	53,995	+4.9%
1971	53,230	−1.4%
1976	57,980	+8.9%
1981	59,421	+2.5%
1986	52,834	−11.1%
1991	58,748	+11.2%

Year	Pop.	±%
1996	63,335	+7.8%
2001	61,802	−2.4%
2006	64,419	+4.2%
2011	57,607	−10.6%
2016	65,533	+13.8%
2021	66,000	+0.7%

Excludes census data for one or more incompletely enumerated Indian reserves. Population counts are not adjusted for boundary changes.
Source: Statistics Canada

== Economy ==
Most of the population is concentrated in the district's extreme south where some agriculture is possible: the main crop is barley. Traditional native activities such as hunting and fishing dominate the north of the district outside of mining settlements.

=== Mining ===
The area near Lake Minnehaha saw a gold rush between 1902 and 1909. The settlement of Gold Rock served 14 area mines, which included the Big Master, Laurentian, Detola and Elora. According to Barnes, "Approximately 180,000 ounces of gold was won from 27 mines in the Kenora district from 1880 to 1976," with "over 331 known gold occurrences." The more successful mines included the Bully Boy, Cameron Island, Champion, Combined, Cornucopia, Gold Hill, Golden Horn, Kenricia, Mikado, Oliver, Olympia, Ophyr, Regina, Scramble, Severn, Stella, Sultana, Treasure and Wendigo.

Mining is currently extremely extensive in northern Kenora District, which contains some of the world's largest and highest-grade reserves of uranium and some of the world's major producers of nickel. A major mining exploration project is currently underway in the Ring of Fire region, centred on the district's isolated McFaulds Lake.

== Transportation ==
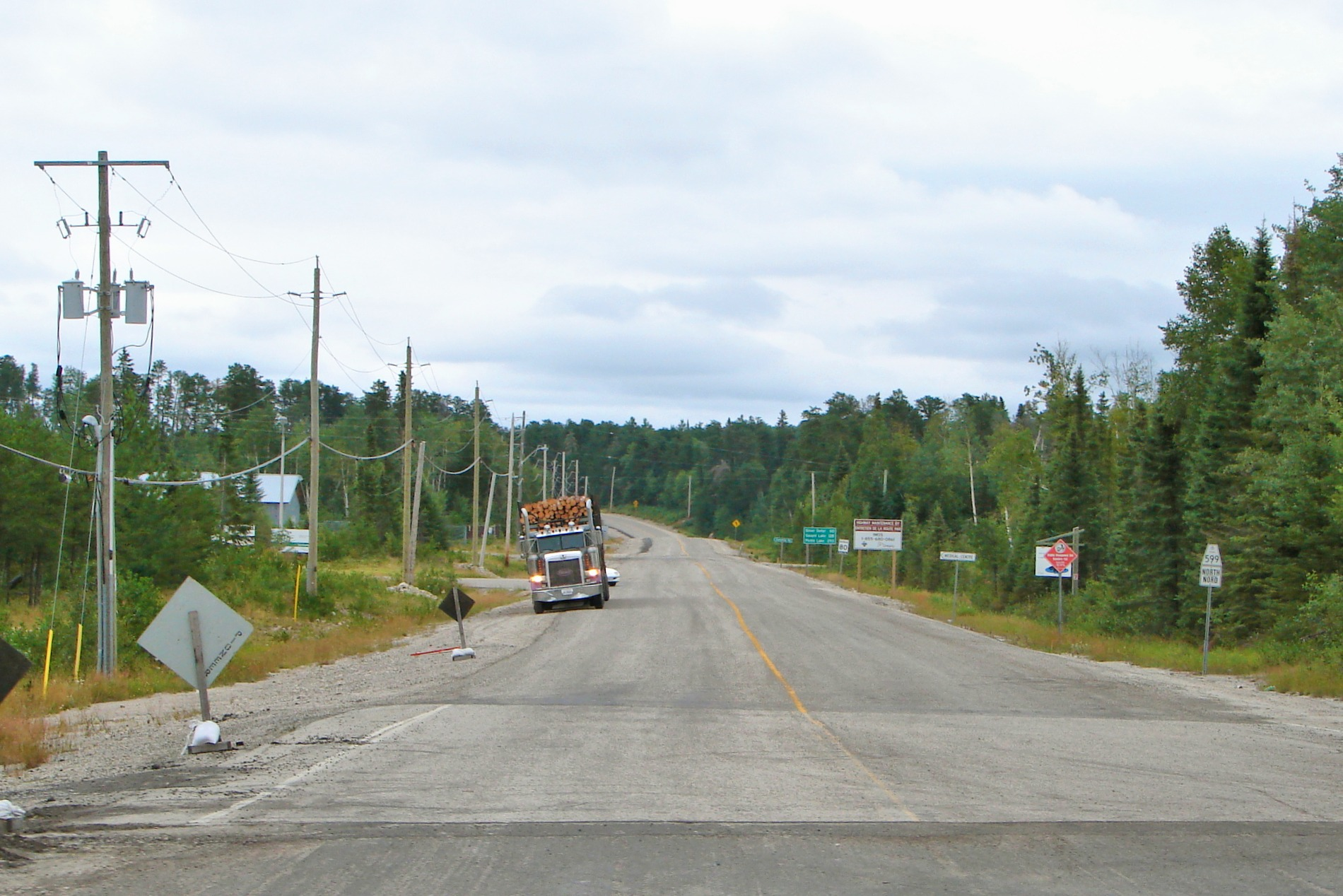
Highway 599, longest secondary highway in Ontario

Permanent roads (Highway 599) only reach about halfway to the northernmost point of Kenora district, with the provincial highway network ending at Pickle Lake. Some more northerly communities connect seasonally through an ice/winter road network to the Northern Ontario Resource Trail.

Year-round air and summertime river transport are the only means of reaching the most remote parts of the district.

The major railroad lines between Toronto and British Columbia pass through the south of the district. The district is served by Via Rail's Canadian at Rice Lake, Copelands Landing, Malachi, Ottermere, Minaki, Redditt, Farlane station, Canyon, Red Lake Road, Richan, and Sioux Lookout stations.

Stations at Kenora District
- Current services at Rice Lake station
  Preceding station	Via Rail	Following station
  Winnitoba toward Vancouver	The Canadian	Copelands Landing toward Toronto
  Former services at Rice Lake station
  Preceding station	Canadian National Railway	Following station
  Winnitoba toward Vancouver	Main Line	Malachi toward Montreal
  Current services at Copelands Landing
  Preceding station	Via Rail	Following station
  Rice Lake toward Vancouver	The Canadian	Malachi toward Toronto
  Former services at Copelands Landing
  Preceding station	Canadian National Railway	Following station
  Rice Lake toward Vancouver	Main Line	Malachi toward Montreal
  Current services at Malachi station
  Preceding station	Via Rail	Following station
  Copelands Landing toward Vancouver	The Canadian	Ottermere toward Toronto
  Former services at Malachi station
  Preceding station	Canadian National Railway	Following station
  Copelands Landing toward Vancouver	Main Line	Ottermere toward Montreal

== See also ==
- List of census divisions of Ontario
- List of townships in Ontario
- List of secondary schools in Ontario#Kenora District
