= Manitoba Highway 5 =

Provincial highway in Manitoba, Canada

Provincial Trunk Highway 5
- Northern Woods and Water Route (section) Northern Cypress Trail (section) Parks Route (entire length)
- Highway 5 highlighted in red

Route information
- Maintained by Manitoba Infrastructure
- Length: 401 km (249 mi)
- Existed: 1928–present

Major junctions
- South end: ND 4 at the U.S. border near Cartwright
- PTH 3 at Cartwright; PTH 23 at Baldur; PTH 2 at Glenboro; PTH 1 (TCH) at Carberry; PTH 16 (TCH) / YH at Neepawa; PTH 50 at McCreary; PTH 68 at Ste. Rose du Lac; PTH 20 at Ochre River; PTH 10 at Dauphin; PTH 83 at Roblin
- West end: Highway 10 west of Roblin

Location
- Country: Canada
- Province: Manitoba
- Rural municipalities: Argyle; Dauphin; Gilbert Plains; Glenboro – South Cypress; Grandview; Lakeshore; McCreary; North Cypress – Langford; Roblin; Rosedale; Ste. Rose
- Major cities: Dauphin
- Towns: Carberry; Neepawa

Highway system
- Provincial highways in Manitoba; Winnipeg City Routes
← PTH 4	→ PTH 6

Provincial Trunk Highway 5 (PTH 5) is a provincial primary highway located in the Canadian province of Manitoba.

The highway starts at the Hansboro–Cartwright Border Crossing on the Canada–United States border and ends at the Saskatchewan boundary 13.6 kilometres (8.5 mi) west of Roblin. Besides Roblin, it passes through the communities of Cartwright, Glenboro, Carberry, Neepawa, McCreary, Ste. Rose Du Lac, Grandview, and Gilbert Plains along its route.

The highway, in a section concurrent with PTH 10, bypasses the city of Dauphin (PTH 5A / 10A does run through Dauphin).

The segment of PTH 5 between PTH 10 and Ste. Rose Du Lac is part of the Northern Woods and Water Route. Further south, PTH 5 is also the main route through Spruce Woods Provincial Park between Glenboro and Carberry. Throughout its entire length, PTH 5 carries the Parks Route designation.

PTH 5, along with PTH 20 and PTH 50, has the distinction of being both a north–south and an east–west highway, though PTH 20 is officially designated north–south for its entire route. From the Canada–United States border to PTH 68 east of Ste. Rose du Lac, PTH 5 is designated as a north–south highway. From PTH 68 to the Saskatchewan border, its designation changes to east–west.

== Route description ==
PTH 5 begins at the United States Hansboro-Cartwright Border Crossing, with the road continuing south into Towner County, North Dakota as North Dakota Highway 4 (ND 4). The highway heads north into the Cartwright - Roblin Municipality, travelling along the flat farmland of the prairies to cross a creek and pass through the town of Cartwright, where it junctions with PTH 3 (Boundary Commission Trail). It leaves Cartwright and makes a short, gradual jog to the northeast, where it crosses Badger Creek, before curving due northward again to cross a wooded valley and crosses the Pembina River just west of Rock Lake.

PTH 5 crosses into the Rural Municipality of Argyle in Neelin, climbing out of the valley back into farmland and going through a switch back, immediately having a short concurrency (overlap) with PR 253. The highway heads due north to cross a couple of creeks and have an intersection with PTH 23 near Baldur. It has an intersection with a former section of PR 245 (which leads several kilometres east to Bruxelles) before entering the Municipality of Glenboro - South Cypress in the middle of a switchback.

PTH 5 travels through the town of Glenboro, where it has an intersection with PTH 2 (Red Coat Trail), before winding its way through the woodlands of Spruce Woods Provincial Park for the next several kilometres, where it crosses the Assiniboine River before entering the Municipality of North Cypress - Langford. The highway passes through the town of Carberry, mostly bypassing it along its eastern side as it has an intersection with PR 351 (former PTH 1 / TCH). It leaves Carberry and has an intersection with PTH 1 / Trans-Canada Highway (TCH) before going through a switchback near Wellwood and having an intersection with PR 353. The highway crosses a couple of creeks before travelling just west of Lake Irwin and entering the town of Neepawa. PTH 5 becomes concurrent with PTH 16 (TCH / Yellowhead Highway), at an intersection with along the banks of the Whitemud River, and they head west through neighbourhoods along Main Street. They travel along the southern edge of downtown (around the intersection with Mountain Avenue) before passing through more neighbourhoods, with PTH 5 breaking off and heading north at the western edge of town, leaving Neepawa and entering the Rural Municipality of Rosedale.

PTH 5 continues nearly due northward for approximately 100 kilometres (62 mi), having an intersection with PR 471 before passing through Eden, where it shares a short concurrency with PR 265. For the next 50 kilometres (31 mi), PTH 5 travels parallel to the eastern boundary of Riding Mountain National Park. The highway has intersections with PR 357 and PR 352, where it crosses a creek, before passing through the hamlet of Riding Mountain. It has an intersection with PR 261 before travelling just west of Kelwood and crossing into the Municipality of McCreary.

PTH 5 has intersections with PTH 19 and PR 462 before passing through the town of McCreary, which it bypasses along its western side to have an intersection with PTH 50 and PR 361. It enters the Municipality of Ste. Rose and has an intersection with PR 480 near Laurier. The highway shares a concurrency with PR 360 before entering the town of Ste. Rose du Lac and immediately having an intersection with PTH 68 in the middle of a sharp curve, where PTH 5 switches cardinal directions from north–south to east–west. PTH 5 bypasses downtown to the south, where it has an intersection with PR 276 and crosses a river, before beginning to parallel the southern shore of Dauphin Lake as it crosses into the Rural Municipality of Lakeshore.

PTH 5 heads west to have another intersection with PR 480 before passing just to the south of Ochre River, where it has an intersection with PTH 20 and PR 582, before crossing the Ochre River and entering the Rural Municipality of Dauphin. The highway leaves Dauphin Lake, becoming concurrent with PTH 10 and the two head north to pass by Lt. Col W.G. (Billy) Barker VC Airport before crossing Edwards Creek and bypassing the city of Dauphin along its southern and western sides, having intersections with PTH 5A / PTH 10A. They have an intersection with PR 274 before crossing into the Gilbert Plains Municipality.

PTH 10 splits off and heads north at a creek crossing near Ashville, with PTH 5 heading west, crossing the Wilson River and travelling through the town of Gilbert Plains, where it has another intersection PR 274. It crosses into the Grandview Municipality and travels up a valley between Duck Mountain Provincial Park and Riding Mountain National Park, where it passes through the town of Grandview, where it has an intersection with PR 366 and crosses the Valley River. PTH 5 travels through the Tootinaowaziibeeng Treaty Reserve as it crosses into the Municipality of Roblin.

PTH 5 has intersections with PR 583, 584, and 591 before travelling straight through the centre of the town of Roblin, where it shares an extremely short concurrency with PTH 83. The highway has an intersection with PR 484 before climbing across the Assiniboine River valley (now occupied by the Lake of the Prairies) and crossing the border into Saskatchewan at the intersection with PR 482. The highway continues west as Saskatchewan Highway 10 (Hwy 10) towards Yorkton.

The entire length of Manitoba Provincial Trunk Highway 5 is a rural, two-lane, paved highway.

== History ==
Prior to 1980, the southern terminus for PTH 5 was at PTH 16 (PTH 4 prior to 1977) in Neepawa, making the original length of the highway 246 kilometres (153 mi).

In 1980, the highway was extended to its current southbound terminus, replacing PR 258 between Neepawa and PTH 3 at Cartwright, via Glenboro and Carberry, and PTH 28 between the U.S. border and Cartwright.

The section between PTH 20 and PTH 10 south of Dauphin was completed and opened to traffic in 1959. Prior to this, PTH 5 turned north at Ochre River and entered Dauphin from the east along what is now PTH 20 and PTH 20A. PTH 5 met PTH 10 south in Dauphin's city centre, from which the two highways continued out of the city in concurrence following the current PTH 5A/10A route (2nd Avenue N.W. / Buchanon Ave.).

== Major intersections ==
Division	Location	km	mi	Destinations	Notes
Cartwright – Roblin		0	0.0	ND 4 south – Hansboro, Jamestown	Continuation into North Dakota
Cartwright – Roblin		0	0.0	Canada–United States border at Hansboro–Cartwright Border Crossing	
Cartwright – Roblin	Cartwright	10	6.2	PTH 3 – Killarney, Pilot Mound	
Argyle		24	15	Road 14 North	Former PR 541 east
Argyle		32	20	PR 253 east – Glenora	South end of PR 253 concurrency
Argyle		34	21	PR 253 west – Pleasant Valley	North end of PR 253 concurrency
Argyle		47	29	PTH 23 – Ninette, Baldur, Swan Lake	
Argyle		60	37	Road 34 North – Bruxelles	Former PR 245 east
Glenboro – South Cypress	Glenboro	70	43	PTH 2 – Souris, Holland	
Town of Carberry		108	67	PR 351 (1st Avenue)	Former PTH 1
North Cypress – Langford		111	69	PTH 1 (TCH) – Brandon, Winnipeg	Site of the 2023 Carberry highway collision
North Cypress – Langford		125	78	Road 70 North – Wellwood	Former PR 353 east
North Cypress – Langford		134	83	PR 353 west – Brookdale	
North Cypress – Langford		142	88	Road 75 North	Former PR 465 west
Town of Neepawa		154	96	PTH 16 (TCH) east / YH – Portage la Prairie	South end of PTH 16 concurrency
Town of Neepawa		155	96	PTH 16 (TCH) west / YH – Minnedosa	North end of PTH 16 concurrency
Rosedale		167	104	PR 471 west – Clanwilliam	
Rosedale	Eden	172	107	PR 265 west – Polonia	South end of PR 265 concurrency
Rosedale		174	108	PR 265 east – Plumas	North end of PR 265 concurrency
Rosedale		179	111	PR 357 west – Mountain Road	
Rosedale		181	112	PR 352 south – Birnie	
Rosedale		194	121	PR 261 east – Glenella	
McCreary		207	129	PTH 19 west – Riding Mountain Park	
McCreary		212	132	PR 462 south	
McCreary	McCreary	217	135	PTH 50 east – Alonsa; PR 361 west – Mount Agassiz	
Ste. Rose		230	140	PR 360 north / PR 480 west – Laurier	
Ste. Rose		241	150	PR 360 south – Ste. Amélie	Former PR 581 east
Ste. Rose	Ste. Rose du Lac	247	153	PTH 68 east (NWRR) – Eriksdale	Former PR 235 east; east end of Northern Woods and Water Route; directional signage changes between north-south and east-west
Ste. Rose	Ste. Rose du Lac	248	154	PR 276 north – Ste. Rose du Lac	
Lakeshore		258	160	PR 480 south – Makinak	
Lakeshore	Ochre River	264	164	PTH 20 north (NWRR) – Winnipegosis; PR 582 south	West end of Northern Woods and Water Route
Dauphin		284	176	PTH 10 south – Riding Mountain National Park, Brandon	East end of PTH 10 concurrency
Dauphin		288	179	PTH 5A west / PTH 10A north – Dauphin	East end of Dauphin Bypass
Dauphin		294	183	PTH 5A east / PTH 10A south – Dauphin	West end of Dauphin Bypass
Dauphin		302	188	PR 274 south – Keld	
Gilbert Plains	Ashville	310	190	PTH 10 north – Swan River	West end of PTH 10 concurrency
Gilbert Plains	Gilbert Plains	324	201	PR 274 – Keld, Venlaw	
Grandview	Grandview	339	211	PR 366 – Duck Mountain Provincial Park	
Roblin		363	226	PR 584 – Petlura, Shortdale	
Roblin		376	234	PR 583 west	
Roblin		379	235	PR 591 north	
Roblin	Roblin	386	240	PTH 83 north – Swan River	East end of PTH 83 concurrency
Roblin	Roblin	386	240	PTH 83 south – Russell	West end of PTH 83 concurrency
Roblin		393	244	PR 484 north	
Roblin		401	249	PR 482 south – Asessippi Provincial Park, Shellmouth	
Roblin		401	249	Highway 10 west – Yorkton	Continuation into Saskatchewan
1.000 mi = 1.609 km; 1.000 km = 0.621 mi: Concurrency terminus; Route transition

== Related routes ==
=== Provincial Trunk Highway 5A ===
Provincial Trunk Highway 5A
- Main Street S, 2nd Avenue NW, Buchanon Avenue
- Location: Dauphin
- Length: 8.3 km (5.2 mi)
- Existed: 1959–present

Provincial Trunk Highway 5A (PTH 5A) is an 8.3-kilometre-long (5.2 mi) running along the original alignment of PTH 5 through downtown Dauphin. It runs entirely concurrent with PTH 10A.

=== Provincial Road 360 ===
Provincial Road 360
- Location: Ste. Amelie
- Length: 30.4 km (18.9 mi)
- Existed: 1966–present

Provincial Road 360 (PR 360) is a 30.4-kilometre-long (18.9 mi) north-south loop off of PTH 5 in the Municipality of Ste. Rose, providing access to the hamlet of Ste. Amelie. It is entirely a two-lane road, with only the east–west portion between its north end and Ste. Amelie being paved, the rest being gravel.

Provincial Road 581
- Location: Ste. Amelie
- Length: 8.3 km (5.2 mi)
- Existed: 1966–1992

Prior to 1992, ran mostly along a different path, stretching for 36.9 kilometres (22.9 mi) from PTH 50 near McCreary, through Ste. Amelie, to come to an end at a junction with PTH 68 (Northern Woods and Water Route; former PR 235) near Ste. Rose du Lac, with the southern east–west connection to PTH 5 being formerly part of PR 480, while the northern east–west connection to PTH 5 from Ste. Amelie was designated as Provincial Road 581 (PR 581).

Division	Location	km	mi	Destinations	Notes
Ste. Rose		0.0	0.0	PTH 5 (Parks Route) – McCreary, Ste. Rose du Lac; PR 480 west – Laurier	Southern terminus; eastern terminus of PR 480; road continues west as PR 480
Ste. Rose		1.1	0.68	Bridge over the Turtle River	
Ste. Rose	Ste. Amelie	22.1	13.7	Sainte Amelie Road	Former PR 360 north; begins following former PR 581; pavement begins
Ste. Rose		30.4	18.9	PTH 5 (Parks Route) – McCreary, Ste. Rose du Lac	Northern terminus; road continues west as Road 135N
1.000 mi = 1.609 km; 1.000 km = 0.621 mi

=== Provincial Road 361 ===
Provincial Road 361
- Road 120N, Road 90W, Road 121N
- Location: Riding Mountain National Park - McCreary
- Length: 7.2 km (4.5 mi)

Provincial Road 361 (PR 361) is a short 7.2-kilometre-long (4.5 mi) east-west spur of PTH 5 in the Municipality of McCreary, providing the town of McCreary with access to both Riding Mountain National Park and the former Mount Agassiz Ski Resort.

=== Provincial Road 480 ===
Provincial Road 480
- Location: Laurier - Makinak
- Length: 29.4 km (18.3 mi)
- Existed: 1966–present

Provincial Road 480 (PR 480) is a 29.4-kilometre-long (18.3 mi) north–south loop off of PTH 5 in the Parkland Region, providing access to the hamlets of Laurier and Makinak. It is entirely a two-lane road and mostly composed of gravel except between Laurier and the highway's southern end, which is paved.

Prior to 1992, PR 480 continued 23.6 kilometres (14.7 mi) along what is now Turtle River Road (Road 94W) and Road 149N, travelling along the southern coastline of Dauphin Lake past Methley Beach to come to an end at a junction with PR 276 just north of Ste. Rose du Lac, and included a bridge over the Turtle River. In addition to, the highway also continued 8.2 kilometres (5.1 mi) past its southern terminus along what is now PR 360 to that highway's original alignment.

Division	Location	km	mi	Destinations	Notes
Ste. Rose		0.0	0.0	PTH 5 (Parks Route) – Ste. Rose du Lac, McCreary; PR 360 north – Ste. Amélie	Southern terminus of both PR 480 and PR 360; road continues as PR 360 northbound (former PR 480 south); southern end of paved section
Ste. Rose	Laurier	4.0	2.5	Northern end of paved section	
Lakeshore	Makinak	21.2	13.2	PR 582 north – Ochre River	Southern terminus of PR 582
Lakeshore		29.4	18.3	PTH 5 (NWWR / Parks Route) – Ochre River, Ste. Rose du Lac	Northern terminus; road continues north as Turtle River Road (Road 94W)
1.000 mi = 1.609 km; 1.000 km = 0.621 mi

=== Provincial Road 484 ===
Provincial Road 484
- Location: Roblin - Makaroff
- Length: 24.5 km (15.2 mi)
- Existed: 1966–present

Provincial Road 484 (PR 484) is a 24.5-kilometre-long (15.2 mi) north-spur of PTH 5 in the Municipality of Roblin, providing access to the hamlets of Deepdale and Makaroff. It is entirely a two lane gravel road, and includes two bridges across Big Boggy Creek.

PR 484 begins just west of the Roblin Airport at an intersection with PTH 5 (Parks Route), heading north through farmland along Road 170W to cross a bridge over Big Boggy Creek before making a sharp left turn at an intersection with PR 593. PR 593 provides access to the nearby hamlet of Deepdale. The highway heads west for a couple of kilometres before cutting back northward as it makes a sharp right onto Road 171W, crossing a railway as it travels along the eastern edge of Makaroff. After crossing Big Boggy Creek a second time via a couple of switchbacks, PR 484 comes to an end shortly thereafter at a junction with PR 363 just east of Togo, Saskatchewan.

Prior to 1992, PR 484 continued 8.2 kilometres (5.1 mi) north along what is now Grandnarrows Road (Road 171W) to an intersection Road 168N just southwest of the town of San Clara.

Division	Location	km	mi	Destinations	Notes
Roblin		0.0	0.0	PTH 5 (Parks Route) – Roblin, Yorkton	Southern terminus; road continues south as Mitchell Road (Road 170W)
Roblin		5.0	3.1	Bridge over Big Boggy Creek	
Roblin		8.7	5.4	PR 593 east – Deepdale	Western terminus of PR 593; former PR 592 north
Roblin	Makaroff	17.6	10.9	Railway Avenue – Makaroff	
Roblin	Makaroff	18.2	11.3	1st Street W – Makaroff	
Roblin		21.1	13.1	Bridge over Big Boggy Creek	
Roblin		24.5	15.2	PR 363 – Togo, San Clara	Northern terminus; road continues north as Grandnarrows Road (Road 171W, former PR 484 north)
1.000 mi = 1.609 km; 1.000 km = 0.621 mi

=== Provincial Road 591 ===
Provincial Road 591
- Location: Municipality of Roblin
- Length: 3.9 km (2.4 mi)
- Existed: 1966–present

Provincial Road 591 (PR 591) is a short 3.9-kilometre-long (2.4 mi) north-south spur of PTH 5 in the eastern part of the Municipality of Roblin, providing a connection to PR 584 halfway between Merridale and Shortdale. It is entirely a gravel two-lane road, and includes a bridge across the Shell River.

Prior to 1992, PR 591 existed on a slightly different routing, taking an east–west trek from PTH 83 on the north side of Roblin to PR 584, while still using the same Shell River bridge and the same terminus at PR 584. PR 591's original length was 8.9 kilometres (5.5 mi).

Division	Location	km	mi	Destinations	Notes
Roblin		0.0	0.0	PTH 5 (Parks Route) – Grandview, Roblin	Southern terminus; road continues south as Road 162W
Roblin		3.4	2.1	Road 152N	Former PR 591 west
Roblin		3.5	2.2	Bridge over the Shell River	
Roblin		3.9	2.4	PR 584 – Merridale, Shortdale	Northern terminus
1.000 mi = 1.609 km; 1.000 km = 0.621 mi
