= Manitoba Highway 50 =

Highway in Manitoba

Provincial Trunk Highway 50
- Kinosota Road
- PTH 50 highlighted in red

Route information
- Maintained by Department of Infrastructure
- Length: 124 km (77 mi)
- Existed: 1953–present

Major junctions
- West end: PTH 5 / PR 361 at McCreary
- South end: PTH 16 (TCH) / YH near Westbourne

Location
- Country: Canada
- Province: Manitoba
- Rural municipalities: Alonsa; McCreary; WestLake – Gladstone

Highway system
- Provincial highways in Manitoba; Winnipeg City Routes
← PTH 49	→ PTH 52

Provincial Trunk Highway 50 (PTH 50) is a provincial highway in the south-central region of the Canadian province of Manitoba. It runs from PTH 16 to PTH 5 and PR 361 in the village of McCreary.

Like PTH 5 and PTH 20, PTH 50 does not run its entire length in one direction. The highway is designated as a north–south highway between PTH 16 and the hamlet of Silver Ridge, where it meets PR 278. From Silver Ridge to McCreary, the highway's designation changes to east–west. Between the Yellowhead Highway and Silver Ridge, PTH 50 is known as Kinosota Road.

PTH 50 provides access to the western shore of Lake Manitoba. The speed limit is 100 km/h (62 mph).

== Route description ==
PTH 50 begins in the Rural Municipality of WestLake - Gladstone at an intersection with PTH 16 (Yellowhead Highway) 7 kilometres (4.3 mi) west of Westbourne, just north of the banks of the Whitemud River and the Hutterite Bloomfield Colony. It heads north, immediately crossing a railroad line and traveling through rural farmland for several kilometers, paralleling the western coastline of Lake Manitoba as it passes the Lakeland community to enter the town of Langruth. Traveling straight through town along Main Street, it has an intersection with PR 265 before leaving Langruth and winding its way north into the Rural Municipality of Alonsa.

Still paralleling the coastline of Lake Manitoba, PTH 50 travels through the Sandy Bay First Nation, having an intersection with the main access road to the First Nations' townsite (Main Road), before passing through the town of Amaranth. Heading straight through the center of town, it has an intersection with PR 261 (Broadway Road) before leaving Amaranth and winding its way past Harcus and Leifur for several kilometers to the community of Silver Ridge, where PTH 50 makes a sharp left turn to the east at an intersection with PR 278, where it turns away from Lake Manitoba.

Between this intersection and it southern terminus at the Yellowhead Highway, PTH 50 is known as Kinosota Road.

The highway passes through the town of Alonsa prior to going through a switchback and entering the Municipality of McCreary. Traveling through rural areas for several kilometers, PTH 50 enters the town of McCreary, passing through neighborhoods as it crosses a railroad line to travel through downtown. It passes through more neighborhoods before coming to an end at an intersection with PTH 5 (Parks Route), with the road continuing west as PR 361.

The entire length of Manitoba Highway 50 is a rural, paved, two-lane highway.

== History ==
PTH 50 first appeared on the 1953 Manitoba Highway Map.

When it was first added, PTH 50 was an east–west route connecting PTH 5 at McCreary to Silver Ridge. The highway's north–south segment was added in 1956.

== Major intersections ==
Division	Location	km	mi	Destinations	Notes
WestLake - Gladstone		0.0	0.0	PTH 16 (TCH) / YH – Portage la Prairie, Neepawa	Southern terminus
WestLake - Gladstone		9.5	5.9	PR 567 east (Steebridge Road / Road 84N)	Western terminus of PR 567
WestLake - Gladstone	Lakeland	12.8	8.0	Road 86N – Lakeland	
WestLake - Gladstone	Lakeland	17.7	11.0	PR 569 east (Road 89N)	Western terminus of PR 569
WestLake - Gladstone	Langruth	26.0	16.2	PR 265 west – Plumas; Road 94N – Big Point	Eastern terminus of PR 265
WestLake - Gladstone		36.2	22.5	Road 100N – Hollywood Beach	Former PR 573 east
Alonsa	Sandy Bay First Nation	44.7	27.8	Main Road – Sandy Bay First Nation	Access road into First Nation
Alonsa	Amaranth	50.0	31.1	PR 261 (Broadway Road) – Glenella	
Alonsa	Silver Ridge	76.1	47.3	PR 278 north – Ebb and Flow	Southern terminus of PR 278; PTH 50 switches cardinal directions from north-south to east-west
Alonsa		88.3	54.9	Road 68W – Birdina	
Alonsa		102.6	63.8	Road 75W to PR 462 – Glenella	
McCreary		119.7	74.4	Ste. Amelie Road – Ste. Amelie	Former PR 360 north
McCreary	McCreary	124	77	PTH 5 (Parks Route) – Neepawa, Ste. Rose du Lac; PR 361 west – Mount Agassiz Ski Resort	Western terminus; road continues west PR 361
1.000 mi = 1.609 km; 1.000 km = 0.621 mi: Route transition

== Related routes ==
=== Provincial Road 567 ===
Provincial Road 567
- Steebridge Road
- Length: 7.5 km (4.7 mi)
- Existed: 1966–present

Provincial Road 567 (PR 567), also known as Steebridge Road, is a short east–west spur of PTH 50 in a rural section of the Rural Municipality of WestLake - Gladstone, just south of Lakeland. Running for 7.5 kilometres (4.7 mi), it provides access to the Lakeland boat launch on the Whitemud River, near its mouth on Lake Manitoba. It is entirely an unpaved two-lane road. No settlements lie along the highway.

Division	Location	km	mi	Destinations	Notes
WestLake - Gladstone		0.0	0.0	PTH 50 (Kinosota Road) – Westbourne, Amaranth	Western terminus; road continues as Steebridge Road (Road 84N)
WestLake - Gladstone		7.5	4.7	Dead end at Lakeland boat launch on the Whitemud River	Eastern terminus
1.000 mi = 1.609 km; 1.000 km = 0.621 mi

=== Provincial Road 569 ===
- Road 89N
- Location: Lakeland
- Length: 5.7 km (3.5 mi)
- Existed: 1966–present

Provincial Road 569 (PR 569), also known as Road 89N, is a short unsigned 5.7-kilometre-long (3.5 mi) east-west spur of PTH 50 in the community of Lakeland in the Rural Municipality of WestLake - Gladstone. It runs from PTH 50 at the northern edge of the community to a dead end along the eastern shores of Lake Manitoba. It is entirely unpaved, with the section between PTH 50 and Road 50W two-lanes wide, with the remaining 0.8 kilometres (0.50 mi) to Lake Manitoba being a narrow one-lane track. No other settlements lie along the highway.

Division	Location	km	mi	Destinations	Notes
WestLake - Gladstone	Lakeland	0.0	0.0	PTH 50 (Kinosota Road) – Westbourne, Amaranth	Western terminus; road continues west as Road 89N
WestLake - Gladstone		5.7	3.5	Dead end at Lake Manitoba	Eastern terminus
1.000 mi = 1.609 km; 1.000 km = 0.621 mi

=== Provincial Road 573 ===
Provincial Road 573
- Road 100N
- Location: Hollywood Beach
- Length: 9.8 km (6.1 mi)
- Existed: 1966–1992

Provincial Road 573 (PR 573) was a 9.8-kilometre-long (6.1 mi) east-west spur of PTH 50 in the northern part of the Municipality of WestLake-Gladstone, connecting it with Hollywood Beach on the western coastline of Lake Manitoba. It was entirely a gravel road, and came to a dead end along the shoreline, with no other settlements or major intersections along its length. The route was decommissioned during the Great Decommissioning of 1992, and still exists as Municipal Road 100N.

Division	Location	km	mi	Destinations	Notes
WestLake-Gladstone		0.0	0.0	PTH 50 (Kinosota Road) – Amaranth, Langruth	Western terminus; road continued west as Road 100N
WestLake-Gladstone	Hollywood Beach	9.8	6.1	Dead end at Lake Manitoba	Eastern terminus
1.000 mi = 1.609 km; 1.000 km = 0.621 mi: Closed/former
