= Manitoba Provincial Road 361 =

Provincial road in Manitoba, Canada

Provincial Road 361
- PR 361 highlighted in red

Route information
- Maintained by Department of Infrastructure
- Length: 7.2 km (4.5 mi)
- Existed: 1966–present

Major junctions
- West end: Riding Mountain National Park east boundary
- East end: PTH 5 / PTH 50 at McCreary

Location
- Country: Canada
- Province: Manitoba
- Rural municipalities: McCreary

Highway system
- Provincial highways in Manitoba; Winnipeg City Routes
← PR 360	→ PR 362

Provincial Road 361 (PR 361) is a very short east-west provincial road in the Parkland Region of Manitoba, Canada.

== Route description ==
PR 361 starts at PTH 5 and PTH 50 in McCreary and terminates at the east boundary of Riding Mountain National Park; from there it continues as an unmarked road. PR 361 provided access to the Mount Agassiz Ski Resort, which was the largest ski hill in Manitoba before it ceased operations in 2000.

The highway is paved for its entire length, about 7 kilometres (4.3 mi).

== Major intersections ==
Division	Location	km	mi	Destinations	Notes
Riding Mountain National Park / McCreary boundary		0.0	0.0	Road 121N	end of provincial maintenance; western terminus; continuation into National Park
McCreary	McCreary	7.2	4.5	PTH 5 (Parks Route) – Ste. Rose du Lac, Neepawa; PTH 50 east – McCreary	Eastern terminus; western terminus of PTH 50; road continues east as PTH 50 eastbound
1.000 mi = 1.609 km; 1.000 km = 0.621 mi
