= Division No. 17, Manitoba =

Census division in Canada

Coordinates: 51°16′45″N 99°48′20″W

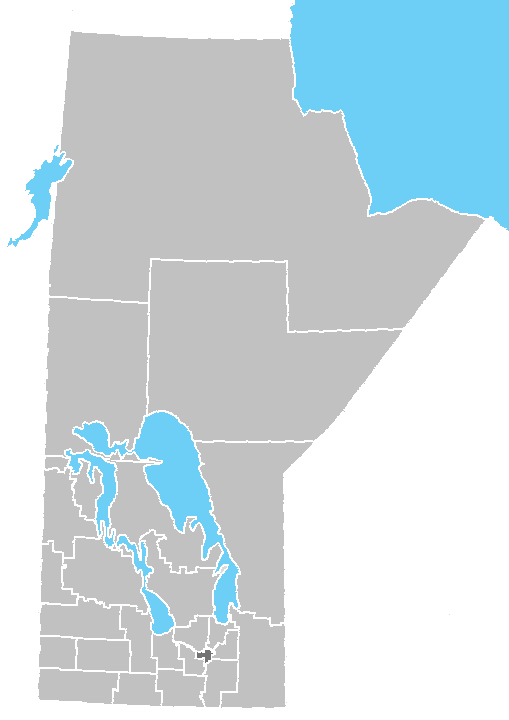

Census Division No. 17 (Dauphin) is a census division located within the Parklands Region of the province of Manitoba, Canada. Unlike in some other provinces, census divisions do not reflect the organization of local government in Manitoba. These areas exist solely for the purposes of statistical analysis and presentation; they have no government of their own.

The economic base of the area is primarily agriculture with some manufacturing and food processing. The population of the division at the 2006 census was 22,358. The division is geographically centred on the city of Dauphin and Dauphin Lake, and contains most of Riding Mountain National Park. Also included in the division is the Ebb and Flow First Nation.This region in located in central Manitoba.

== Demographics ==
In the 2021 Census of Population conducted by Statistics Canada, Division No. 17 had a population of 21,996 living in 9,468 of its 11,521 total private dwellings, a change of −0.9% from its 2016 population of 22,205. With a land area of 13,630.54 km^{2} (5,262.78 sq mi), it had a population density of 1.6/km^{2} (4.2/sq mi) in 2021.

== City ==
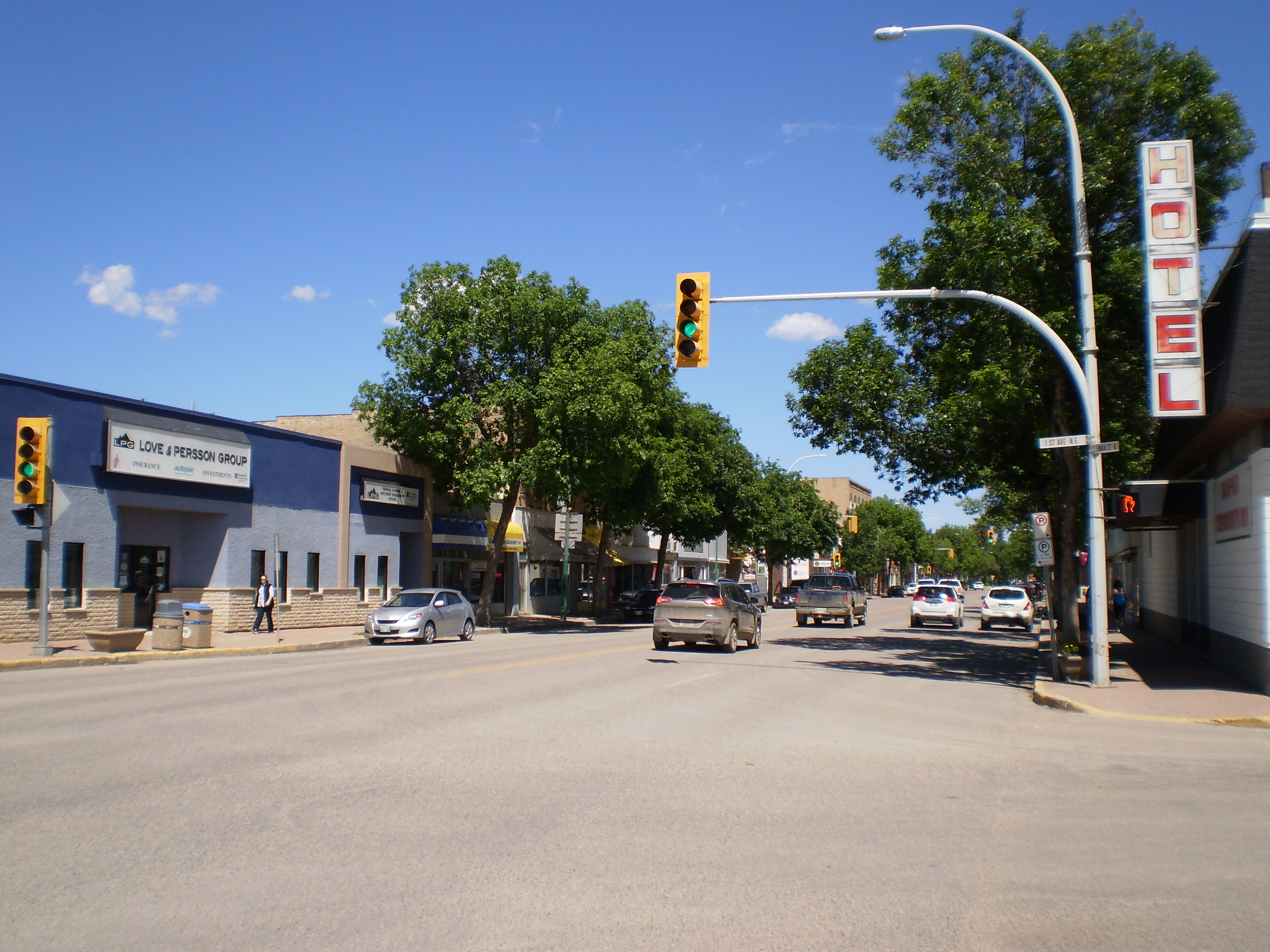
Main Street in Dauphin

- Dauphin

== Unincorporated communities ==
- Ethelbert
- Gilbert Plains
- Grandview
- McCreary
- Ste. Rose du Lac
- Winnipegosis

== Municipalities ==
- Alonsa
- Dauphin
- Ethelbert
- Gilbert Plains
- Grandview
- Lakeshore
- McCreary
- Mossey River
- Ste. Rose

== Reserve ==
- Ebb and Flow 52

== Unorganized Area ==
- Unorganized Division No. 17
