= Manitoba Provincial Road 278 =

Provincial Road in Manitoba, Canada

Provincial Road 278
- PR 278 highlighted in red

Route information
- Maintained by Department of Infrastructure
- Length: 41.8 km (26.0 mi)
- Existed: 1966–present

Major junctions
- South end: PTH 50 at Silver Ridge
- North end: PTH 68 near Eddystone

Location
- Country: Canada
- Province: Manitoba
- Rural municipalities: Alonsa

Highway system
- Provincial highways in Manitoba; Winnipeg City Routes
← PR 276	→ PR 279

Provincial Road 278 (PR 278) is a 41.8-kilometre-long (26.0 mi) north–south highway in the Rural Municipality of Alonsa, Manitoba. Running along the western coastlines of both Lake Manitoba and Ebb and Flow Lake, it serves as the only road access to the Ebb and Flow First Nation, as well as connecting Kinosota, Bacon Ridge, Eddystone, Reedy Creek, and Silver Ridge. Margaret Bruce Provincial Park can also be accessed from the highway.

== Route description ==
PR 278 begins at a junction with Provincial Trunk Highway 50 (PTH 50) (Kinosota Road) in Silver Ridge, almost immediately having an intersection with Bluff Creek Road (which provides access to Margaret Bruce Provincial Park) before heading northeast through a mix of farmland and wooded areas for the next several kilometres, paralleling the coastline of Lake Manitoba. It has an intersection with Kinosota Access Road (which provides access to both Kinosota and Manitoba House) before going switchbacks as it travels through Reedy Creek, where the highway begins following the coastline of Ebb and Flow Lake. PR 278 passes through Bacon Ridge before travelling through the Ebb and Flow First Nation, serving as its main thoroughfare. The highway comes to an end shortly thereafter at an intersection with PTH 68 (Northern Woods and Water Route) just south of Eddystone. The entire length of PR 278 is a paved, two-lane highway.

== Major intersections ==
Division	Location	km	mi	Destinations	Notes
Alonsa	Silver Ridge	0.0	0.0	PTH 50 (Kinosota Road) – Amaranth, Alonsa, McCreary	Southern terminus; road continues as PTH 50 south
Alonsa	Silver Ridge	1.8	1.1	Bluff Creek Road (Road 123N) – Margaret Bruce Provincial Park	
Alonsa		8.8	5.5	Bridge over Garrioch Creek	
Alonsa		12.6	7.8	Kinosota Access Road (Road 129N) – Kinosota, Manitoba House	
Alonsa	Reedy Creek	18.0	11.2	Bridge over Reedy Creek	
Ebb and Flow First Nation	No major junctions				
Alonsa		41.8	26.0	PTH 68 (NWWR) – Ste. Rose du Lac, Lake Manitoba Narrows	Northern terminus; road continues north as Road 141N
1.000 mi = 1.609 km; 1.000 km = 0.621 mi
