= Parkland Region =

Coordinates: 51°40′N 100°10′W

- Region of Manitoba
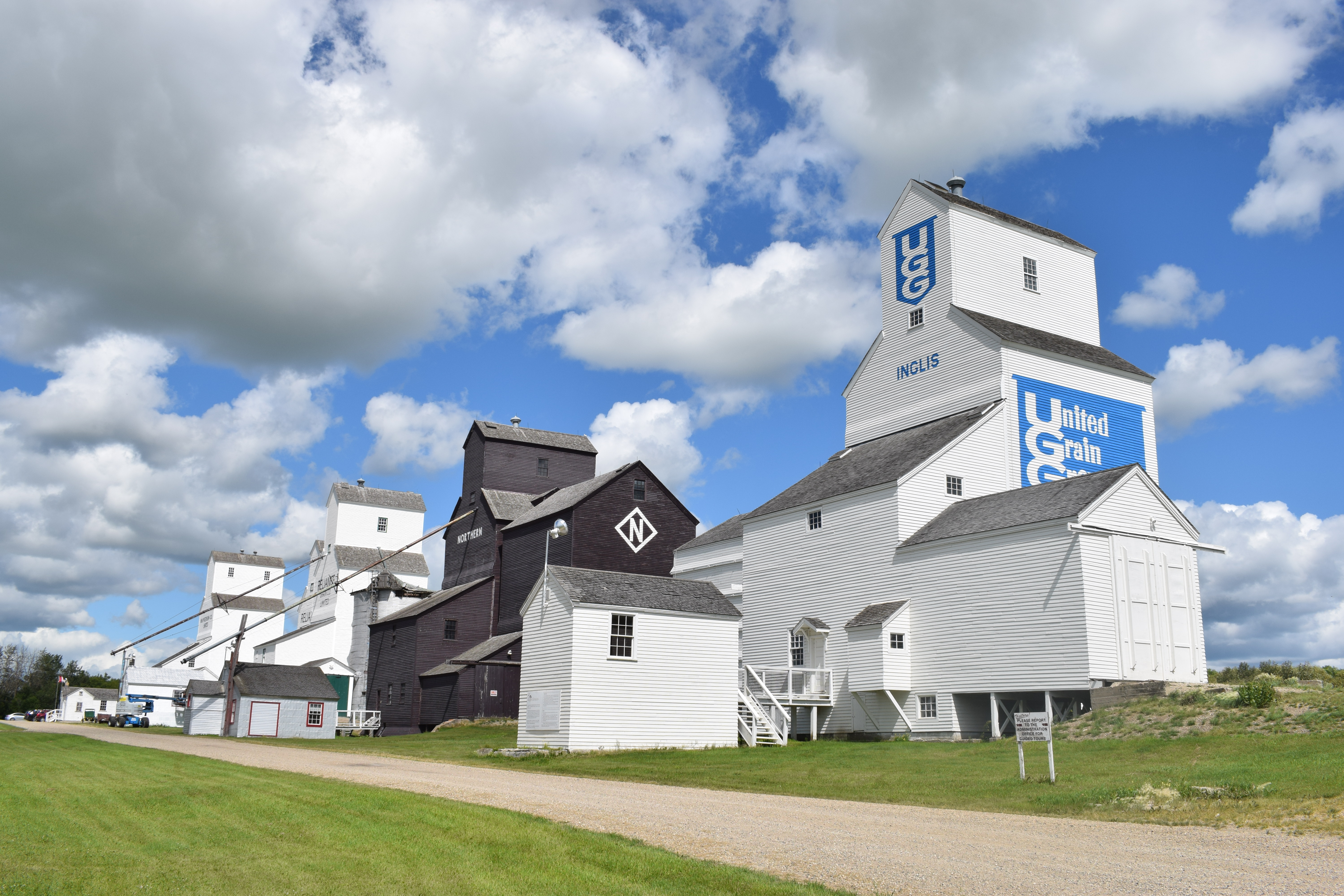
- The grain elevator row in Inglis, Manitoba, a national historic site.

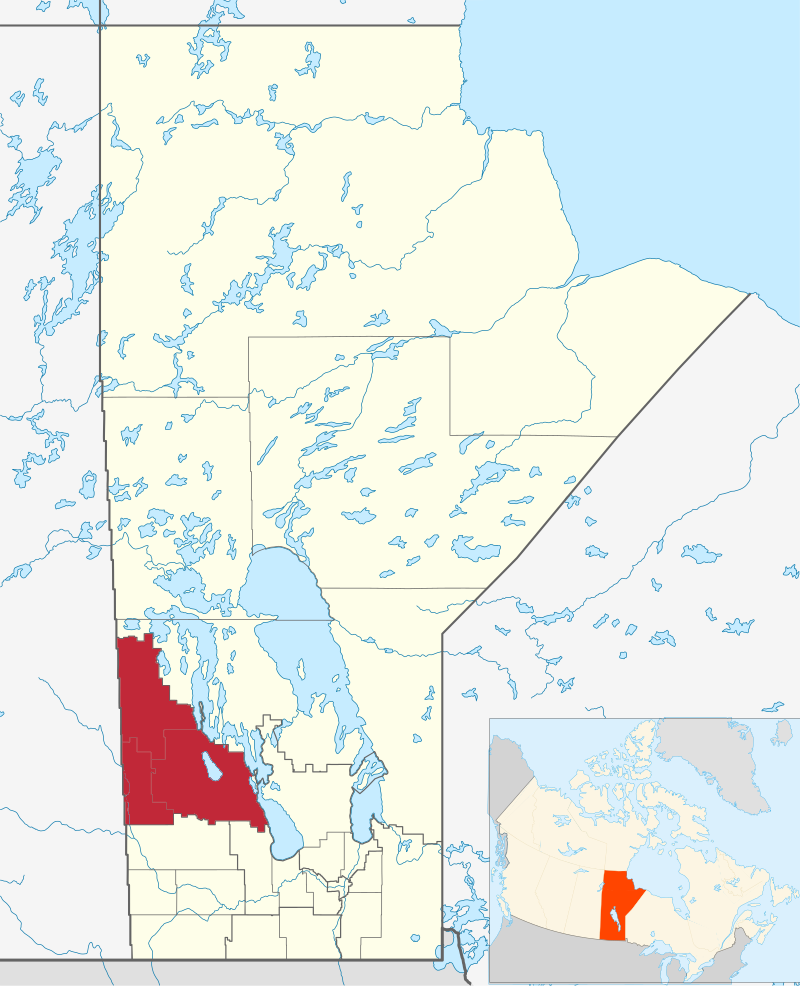
- Map of the Parkland Region of Manitoba.
- Country: Canada
- Province: Manitoba

Area
  - Total: 28,163.15 km^{2} (10,873.85 sq mi)

Population (2021)
  - Total: 41,575
  - Density: 1.4762/km^{2} (3.8234/sq mi)

Parkland is an informal geographic region of the Canadian province of Manitoba, located between Lakes Manitoba and Winnipegosis on the east and the Manitoba–Saskatchewan border on the west.

The largest population centre is the city of Dauphin, and the second largest is the town of Swan River. Riding Mountain National Park, Duck Mountain Provincial Park, and Asessippi Provincial Park are also located in the region, as well as Manitoba's highest point, Baldy Mountain.

Together with the Westman Region to the south, Parkland composes the broader Prairie Mountain region, and is provided health services via Prairie Mountain Health. As of 2021, the Parkland region had a population of 41,575.

== Major communities ==
Urban municipalities:

- Dauphin (city)
- Swan River (town)

Unorganized areas:

- Unorganized Division No. 17
- Unorganized North Division No. 20
- Unorganized South Division No. 20

=== Rural municipalities and communities ===
Rural municipality	Unincorporated communities	Census division
Alonsa	Alonsa; Amaranth; Bacon Ridge; Bluff Creek; Cayer; Eddystone; Harcus; Kinosota; Lonely Lake; Moore Dale; Portia; Reedy Creek; Reykjavik; Shergrove; Silver Ridge	No. 17
Dauphin	Keld; North Junction; Paulson; Sifton; Trembowla; Valley River	No. 17
Ethelbert	Ethelbert (UUC); Garland; Mink Creek	No. 17
Gilbert Plains	Ashville; Gilbert Plains (UUC); Halicz; Venlaw; Zoria	No. 17
Grandview	Grandview (UUC); Meharry	No. 17
Lakeshore	East Bay; Freedale; Magnet; Makinak; Million; Moose Bay; Ochre River; Rorketon; Toutes Aides; Weiden	No. 17
McCreary	Glencairn; McCreary (UUC); Norgate; Reeve	No. 17
Minitonas – Bowsman	Bowsman (UUC); Minitonas (UUC); Renwer (unorganized hamlet)	No. 20
Mossey River	Fork River; Oak Brae; Volga; Winnipegosis (UUC)	No. 17
Mountain	Bellsite; Birch River; Cowan; Duck River; Lenswood; Mafeking; Novra; Pine River; Pulp River; Sclater	No. 20
Riding Mountain West	Angusville; Cracknell; Dropmore; Endcliffe; Inglis (local urban district); Lennard; Petlura; Shellmouth; Silverton	No. 16
Roblin	Bield; Boggy Creek; Deepdale; Makaroff; Merridale; Roblin (UUC); San Clara; Shevlin; Shortdale; Tummel; Walkerburn; Zelena	No. 16
Rossburn	Birdtail; Olha; Rossburn; Vista	No. 16
Russell – Binscarth	Binscarth; Harrowby; Johnson; Millwood; Russell (UUC)	No. 16
Ste. Rose	Laurier (designated place); Ste. Amélie; Ste. Rose du Lac (UUC); Valpoy	No. 17
Swan Valley West	Benito; Durban; Kenville	No. 20

=== First Nations and reserves ===
- Ebb and Flow (Ebb and Flow 52)
- Gambler (Gambler 63, partly)
- Tootinaowaziibeeng
- Valley River 63A
- Waywayseecappo

== Recreation and points of interest ==
=== Parks and geography ===
- Asessippi Provincial Park
- Asessippi Ski Area — Manitoba's largest ski resort
- Dauphin Lake
- Duck Mountain Provincial Forest
  - Duck Mountain Provincial Park
  - Baldy Mountain — Manitoba's highest peak
- Manipogo Provincial Park
- Riding Mountain Biosphere Reserve
  - Riding Mountain National Park
- Shellmouth Reservoir
- Thunderhill Ski Area
- Valley River

=== Transport ===
- Dauphin station
- Gilbert Plains station
- Grandview railway station
- Laurier railway station
- Lt. Col W.G. (Billy) Barker VC Airport
- Ochre River station
- Roblin railway station
- Ste. Rose du Lac Airport
- Provincial Trunk Highways 5, 10, 16, 20, and 83
- Swan River Airport

=== Recreation and other ===
- Assiniboine Community College (satellite campus)
- Credit Union Place
- Dauphin’s Countryfest
- Inglis Grain Elevators National Historic Site
- Richardson Recreation and Wellness Centre
- Swan River Centennial Arena
- Waywayseecappo Wolverines Complex

Sports teams

- Dauphin Kings
- Swan Valley Stampeders
- Waywayseecappo Wolverines
