= Manitoba Highway 19 =

Highway in Manitoba

Provincial Trunk Highway 19
- PTH 19 highlighted in red

Route information
- Maintained by Manitoba Infrastructure
- Length: 34 km (21 mi)
- Existed: 1947–present

Major junctions
- West end: PTH 10 in Riding Mountain National Park
- East end: PTH 5 near Norgate

Location
- Country: Canada
- Province: Manitoba
- Rural municipalities: McCreary

Highway system
- Provincial highways in Manitoba; Winnipeg City Routes
← PTH 18	→ PTH 20

Provincial Trunk Highway 19 (PTH 19) is a short east–west provincial highway in the west-central region of the Canadian province of Manitoba. It runs from PTH 5 near Norgate to PTH 10 near Wasagaming. Most of the road is situated within Riding Mountain National Park

== Route description ==
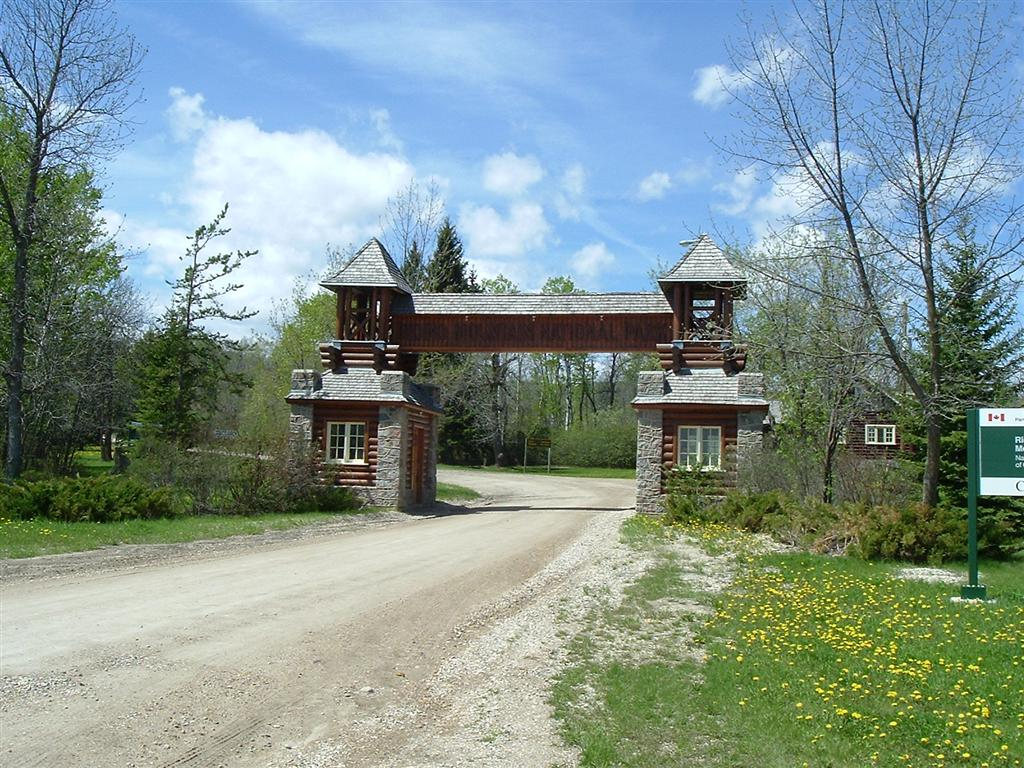
Riding Mountain East Gate on PTH 19

As of 2018, PTH 19 is the only provincial trunk highway in Manitoba in which the entire length of the route is unpaved. The route travels within Riding Mountain National Park, with the exception of 5 kilometres (3.1 miles) between PTH 5 and the park's eastern gate. The highway is closed to heavy truck traffic inside the park during the winter months.

PTH 19 provides access to campgrounds and hiking trails along Lake Katherine and Whirlpool Lake on the east side of the park, as well as access to the trailhead to Grey Owl's Cabin.

The speed limit on this highway is 90 km/h between PTH 5 and the East Entrance, and 60 km/h within the park limits.

== History ==
PTH 19 was designated in 1928 from Killarney to Wawanesa. In 1929, this became part of PTH 18. The current route for PTH 19 was designated in 1947, having been previously designated Provincial Trunk Highway 5A (PTH 5A) since 1940.

== Major intersections ==
Division	Location	km	mi	Destinations	Notes
No. 17	Riding Mountain National Park	0	0.0	PTH 10 – Wasagaming, Dauphin	Western terminus
McCreary		34	21	PTH 5 (Parks Route) – McCreary, Neepawa	Eastern terminus
1.000 mi = 1.609 km; 1.000 km = 0.621 mi
