= St. Bede's Anglican Church =

Historic Anglican church on Lake Manitoba

- St. Bede's Anglican Church
- 50.91535°N 98.86729°W
- Location: Kinosota, Alonsa, Manitoba
- Denomination: Anglican Church in North America

History
- Dedication: Bede

Architecture
- Completed: 1922

Administration
- Diocese: Canada

Clergy
- Rector: The Rev. Jona Weitzel

St. Bede's Anglican Church is a historic wooden church in Kinosota, Alonsa, Manitoba.

== History ==
Located near the Manitoba House site at a location known as Kinosota or Staggville, the church dates its origins to 1842 as a missionary outpost for local First Nations people on the western shore of Lake Manitoba. The congregation at Kinosota was originally part of the Fairford mission area, and early mission work in Kinosota was led by William Stagg and James Settee. The first burial in the church's cemetery dates to 1889. The church was the site of an 1894 visit from Primate of Canada Robert Machray. The present church on the site was built and dedicated in 1922.

In 2008, as part of the broader Anglican realignment, the largely Métis congregation voted 29 to 1 to break away from the Anglican Church of Canada's Diocese of Brandon and affiliate with the Anglican Network in Canada. The departure was contentious, with Bishop of Brandon Jim Njegovan initially refusing to recognize the vote. At the time, St. Bede's was part of a multi-point parish and the congregational meeting in Kinosota had been called by the non-stipendiary assistant priest, not the rector of the overall parish.
