= Ian Ross (playwright) =

Canadian playwright (1968–2025)

- Born: April 8, 1968; McCreary, Manitoba, Canada
- Died: November 18, 2025 (aged 57)
- Education: Bachelor of Arts in Film & Theatre
- Occupations: Playwright, novelist
- Writing career
- Language: English
- Genres: Comedy, drama
- Notable works: fareWel, Joe from Winnipeg
- Notable awards: 1997 Governor General's Award for English Drama

Ian Ross (April 8, 1968 – November 18, 2025) was an Ojibwe playwright.

== Life and career ==
Ross was born in 1968 in McCreary, Manitoba, Canada, the son of Grace and Raymond Ross. He earned a Bachelor of Arts degree with a major in film and a minor in theatre from the University of Manitoba in 1992. He spent the first five years of his life in the Métis community of Kinosota, Manitoba before moving to Winnipeg, where he lived in later years. Ross wrote for theatre, film, television and radio, and wrote plays for a number of years but was perhaps best known as the creator of fareWel. FareWel was Ross’ first professional production, which later won him the 1997 Governor General's Award for English Drama, making Ross the first First Nations person to win the award.

Ross was also the author of a number of plays which include: The Gap, Heart of a Distant Tribe, Bic Off!, Bereav'd of Light, An Illustrated History of the Anishinabe, and a children's play called, Baloney! Ross' plays have been produced by the Manitoba Theatre for Young People, Black Hole Theatre Company, and the Winnipeg Fringe Theatre Festival. Ross wrote many segments for CBC, but was well known for his humorous segment on the radio as "Joe from Winnipeg". After "Joe from Winnipeg" aired, episodes were later published in two books, The Book of Joe and Joe from Winnipeg.

fareWel is fictional comedy about a group of First Nations that are forced to take control of their own lives, when their chief leaves to gamble in Las Vegas. As the Reserve is declaring self-government and the people are no longer receiving their welfare cheques, a new chief is elected by manipulation. The text was published by Scirocco 1997, and the play premiered at Prairie Theatre Exchange (PTE) in 1996, and was remounted at PTE in 1998. FareWel was later invited to the Edinburgh Festival Fringe in 2001.

The Gap is a play that portrays a love relationship between an Indigenous man and a French woman set against the backdrop of a flood and premiered at Prairie Theatre Exchange in 2001.

An Illustrated History of the Anishinabe, is a three-person play that started in Winnipeg for only eight days of school performances. The play uses a healthy amount of comedy to tell the story of First Nations history on the Prairies. Anishinabe is a word the prairie Ojibwa people used to describe themselves.

Ross died on November 18, 2025, at the age of 57.

== Plays ==
- Don't Eat Any Red Snow
- CDED
- Canadian Steel
- King of Saturday Night
- Zombies
- Residue of Pain
- fareWel
  - Asamikawin-- ("fareWel" in Cree translation)
- Heart of a Distant Tribe
- The Gap
  - Towaw -- ("The Gap" in Cree translation)
- Bereav’d of Light
- Bic Off!
- An Illustrated History of the Anishinabe
- Baloney!
- Fabric of the Sky
- Doubtful House
- The Third Colour

== Awards ==
- Winner, James Buller Award, 1999.
- Winner, fareWel, Governor General's Award for Drama, 1997.
- Winner, John Hirsch Award for Most Promising Manitoba Writer, 1996.
