= Laurier, Manitoba =

Laurier
- Unincorporated urban community
- Location of Laurier in Manitoba
- Coordinates: 50.890°N 99.561°W
- Country: Canada
- Province: Manitoba
- Region: Parkland
- Rural municipality: Ste. Rose
- Named for: Wilfrid Laurier

Area
  - Total: 5.54 km^{2} (2.14 sq mi)
  - Land: 5.40 km^{2} (2.08 sq mi)

Population (2016)
  - Total: 152
  - Density: 28.5/km^{2} (74/sq mi)
- Time zone: UTC−6 (CST)
  - Summer (DST): UTC−5 (CDT)

Laurier is an unincorporated urban community in the Rural Municipality of Ste. Rose, Manitoba, Canada. It is located on Highway 480, 3.2 km (2.0 mi) west of Highway 5, between the community of McCreary to the south and the community of Ste. Rose du Lac to the north.

The community is recognized as a designated place by Statistics Canada.

== History ==
Laurier was identified as a railway point on a map in 1896 with the Canadian National Railway arriving the following year. The post office was opened as Fosbery and changed to Laurier in 1897 in honour of Sir Wilfrid Laurier, the Prime Minister of Canada at that time.

== Demographics ==
In the 2021 Census of Population conducted by Statistics Canada, Laurier had a population of 177 living in 81 of its 85 total private dwellings, a change of 14.9% from its 2016 population of 154. With a land area of 5.4 km^{2} (2.1 sq mi), it had a population density of 32.8/km^{2} (84.9/sq mi) in 2021.

== Railway station ==
Laurier is served by Via Rail's Winnipeg–Churchill train.

== See also ==
- List of designated places in Manitoba
