= Rural Municipality of Ste. Rose =

Rural municipality in Manitoba, Canada

Coordinates: 51°01′20″N 99°25′50″W

The Rural Municipality of Ste. Rose is a former rural municipality (RM) in the Canadian province of Manitoba. It was originally incorporated as a rural municipality on November 15, 1902. It ceased on January 1, 2015 as a result of its provincially mandated amalgamation with the Town of Sainte Rose du Lac to form the Municipality of Ste. Rose.

It was located in the Parkland Region of the province and had a population of 791 in the 2006 census.

== Communities ==
- Laurier
- Ste. Amélie
- Valpoy

== See also ==
- Laurier station (Manitoba)
