= Rural Municipality of Gilbert Plains =

Rural municipality in Manitoba, Canada

Coordinates: 51°09′17″N 100°26′17″W

The Rural Municipality of Gilbert Plains is a former rural municipality (RM) in the Canadian province of Manitoba. It was originally incorporated as a rural municipality on March 30, 1897. It ceased on January 1, 2015 as a result of its provincially mandated amalgamation with the Town of Gilbert Plains to form the Gilbert Plains Municipality.

The RM was located in the Parkland Region of the province and had a population of 834 according to the Canada 2006 Census. Part of Riding Mountain National Park was located within the southern portion of the RM.

== Communities ==
- Ashville
- Halicz
- Venlaw
- Zoria

== See also ==
- Gilbert Plains (electoral district)
- Gilbert Plains Airport
- Gilbert Plains station
