= Sandy Bay First Nation =

First Nation in Manitoba, Canada

Sandy Bay Ojibway First Nation Marius, Manitoba
- Indian reserve
- Reserve No. 5
- Motto: All the Way
- Location within Manitoba
- Coordinates: 50.55000°N 98.64722°W
- Country: Canada
- Province: Manitoba
- Settled: 1872, 1882
- White Mud River Totogun: 1883

Government
  - Type: Band government

Population (2018)
  - Total: 6,776
- Time zone: UTC-6 (CST)
  - Summer (DST): UTC-5 (CDT)
- Postal code: R0H 0T0
- Area code: 204
- Sandy Bay Ojibway First Nation
- Gaa-wiikwedaawangaag
- People: Ojibway/Dakota
- Treaty: Treaty 1

Land
- Main reserve: Sandy Bay

Government
- Chief: Trevor Prince
- Council: Jason Starr Sr., Randal Roulette, Michael Dumas

Website
- sandybayfirstnation.com

Sandy Bay Ojibway First Nation (Ojibwe: Gaa-wiikwedaawangaag) is an Ojibwa First Nation in Manitoba, Canada. As of the 2016 Canadian Census, it had a population of 2,515; while the First Nation's website reported a membership of 6,905 individuals as of December 2019.

It is located on the western shore of Lake Manitoba. Adjacent rural municipalities are Alonsa and WestLake - Gladstone. The main reserve of Sandy Bay (Indian Reserve No. 5)—or Marius, Manitoba—is located at 50°33′00″N 98°38′50″W.

== Early history ==
Sandy Bay's original roots began after the signing of Treaty 1, in 1870 in Portage la Prairie, Manitoba.

In 1871, the Ojibway/French mixed-bloods, or "half-breeds", of the Portage Band requested a reservation be set aside for them. While the request was accepted, the half-breeds were required "to move North, not nearer than 20 miles" where the current-day town of Westbourne is located. The new half-breed reserve was named Whitemud. In 1873, the reserve and its members were relocated again, straight north this time. In 1877, the residents of Whitemud were told to move again after the surveyor told them he made a mistake; this time, they were to head just one mile southeast, at the present-day location of Sandy Bay. The Ojibway/French mixed-blood reserve was thereafter renamed Sandy Bay.

On 21 July 1884, Sandy Bay had its very first elections. Francois Demarais won and became the first elected Chief, with Baptiste Spence and Wah-sah-hook winning for the first-ever councilor positions.

== Notes ==
Sandy Bay First Nation has a radio station that operates a First Nations Community radio programming at 106.3 FM with the call sign CISB-FM.
