= Isaac Cowie =

Canadian politician (1848–1917)

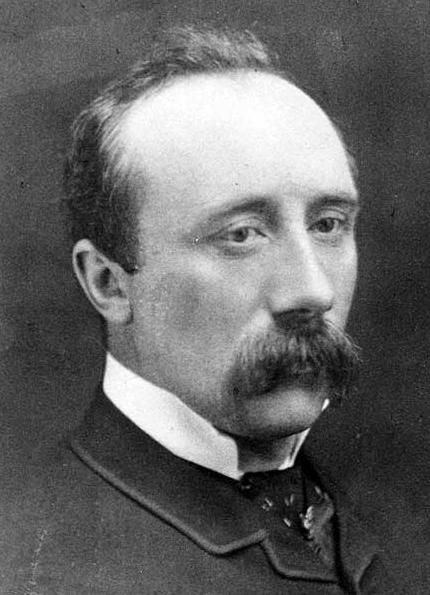

Alderman on the Edmonton Town Council
- In office January 13, 1896 – July 7, 1896

Personal details
- Born: November 18, 1848 Lerwick, Shetland
- Died: May 18, 1917 (aged 68) Winnipeg, Manitoba
- Profession: Pioneer, fur trader

Isaac Cowie (November 18, 1848 – May 18, 1917) was a Scottish-born Canadian pioneer, fur trader, and politician. He served on the town council of Edmonton. His published memoirs reveal the lifestyle of fur traders and pioneers of the western Canada.

== Biography ==
Cowie was born in Lerwick, Shetland on November 18, 1848. He spent two years volunteering with the 1st Edinburgh and Shetland Rifles. He attended the University of Edinburgh for one session, studying medicine, but did not complete his education before taking a position with the Hudson's Bay Company and moving to Rupert's Land in Canada.

His first posting was in Fort Qu'Appelle, Saskatchewan, where he stayed until 1874, acting as manager of the post from 1872. In 1873, he dissuaded disgruntled First Nations from raiding the fort by meeting an armed band of them at the fort with two other men, revolvers in hand. For this he was made a justice of the peace.

He was later stationed at Oak Point on Lake Manitoba, Fort McMurray, Alberta, Manitoba House, and Isle à la Crosse. In 1891, he moved to Edmonton to become the first secretary of its Board of Trade. While there, working under Dr Franz Boas, he sent a collection of Cree artifacts to the World's Columbian Exposition; this collection later went to the Field Museum of Natural History in Chicago.

In 1896, Cowie ran for Edmonton's town council as an alderman. He was elected, finishing fourth of eight candidates (the top six were elected). However, he resigned on July 7 of the same year.

In 1901, Cowie moved to Winnipeg, where he commenced writing some memoirs; these were published in 1913 under the name The Company of Adventurers : A Narrative of Seven Years in the Service of the Hudson's Bay Company during 1867-1874.

He was active with the Pioneers of Rupert's Land, a group devoted to the rights of white settlers in Rupert's Land at the time of its transfer to Canada. He was concerned that many of these pioneers did not receive land grants from Canada, and made numerous trips to Ottawa to fight this. Barbara Johnstone, writing in the Manitoba Pageant in 1959, stated that Prime Minister Sir Robert Borden agreed to change the relevant legislation but was defeated by Wilfrid Laurier's Liberals before doing so. (However, this was in error since Arthur Meighen was prime minister after Borden, or she was referring to Tupper who was succeeded by Laurier in 1896.)

Isaac Cowie died of cancer in Winnipeg May 18, 1917.
