= Kyle Edwards (writer) =

Anishinaabe writer from Canada

- Education: Ryerson University
- Occupations: Novelist, journalist
- Writing career
- Notable work: Small Ceremonies
- Notable awards: Governor General's Award for English-language fiction (2025)

Kyle Edwards is an Anishinaabe writer from Manitoba, Canada. His debut novel, Small Ceremonies, was published in 2025.

== Early life and education ==
Edwards is a member of the Ebb and Flow First Nation and grew up on the Lake Manitoba First Nation. He studied journalism at Ryerson University. From 2021 to 2023, he was a Wallace Stegner Fellow in Fiction at Stanford University. He is currently pursuing his doctorate in creative writing and literature at the University of Southern California, where he is a provost fellow.

== Career ==
His debut novel, Small Ceremonies, was published by Pantheon Books in 2025. It was the winner of the Governor General's Award for English-language fiction at the 2025 Governor General's Awards. The book was nominated for the 2026 Dublin Literary Award and the 2026 Amazon Canada First Novel Award. It was a finalist for the 2026 Young Lions Fiction Award.

He is a member of the editorial staff at The New Yorker. He has published work for BBC News, Maclean's, Native News Online, CBC News and the Toronto Star. He won the CAJ/JHR Emerging Indigenous Journalist Award in 2019.

== Bibliography ==
- Small Ceremonies. Pantheon Books. 2025. ISBN 9780593701515.
