= Hansboro–Cartwright Border Crossing =

Canada–United States border crossing

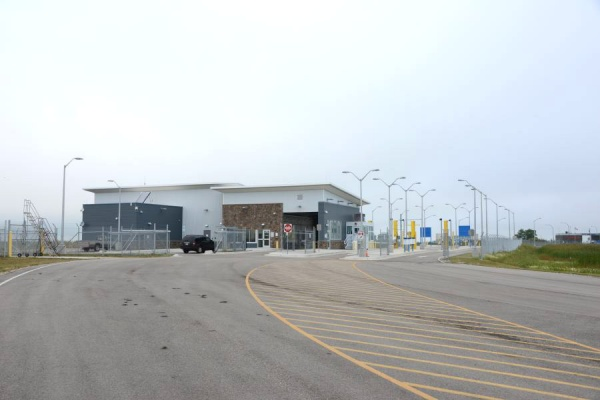
- US border inspection station at Hansboro, North Dakota

Locaiton
- Country: United States; Canada
- Location: ND 4 / PTH 5; US Port: 10935 North Dakota Highway 4, Hansboro, North Dakota 58339; Canadian Port: Manitoba Highway 5, Cartwright, Manitoba R0K 0L0
- Coordinates: 48.999585°N 99.346938°W

Details
- Opened: 1914

Website
- http://www.cbp.gov/contact/ports/hansboro

The Hansboro–Cartwright Border Crossing connects the towns of Hansboro, North Dakota and Cartwright, Manitoba on the Canada–United States border. It is connected by North Dakota Highway 4 in Towner County on the American side and Manitoba Highway 5 in Cartwright – Roblin Municipality on the Canadian side.

The Hansboro border station, which was built in 1963, was replaced in 2011. The Canadian Customs port of Cartwright was established in 1914 in the town of Cartwright, and was relocated to the US border in the 1930s. The current border station was built in 1982.

== See also ==
- List of Canada–United States border crossings
