= Hansboro, North Dakota =

City in North Dakota, United States

- City
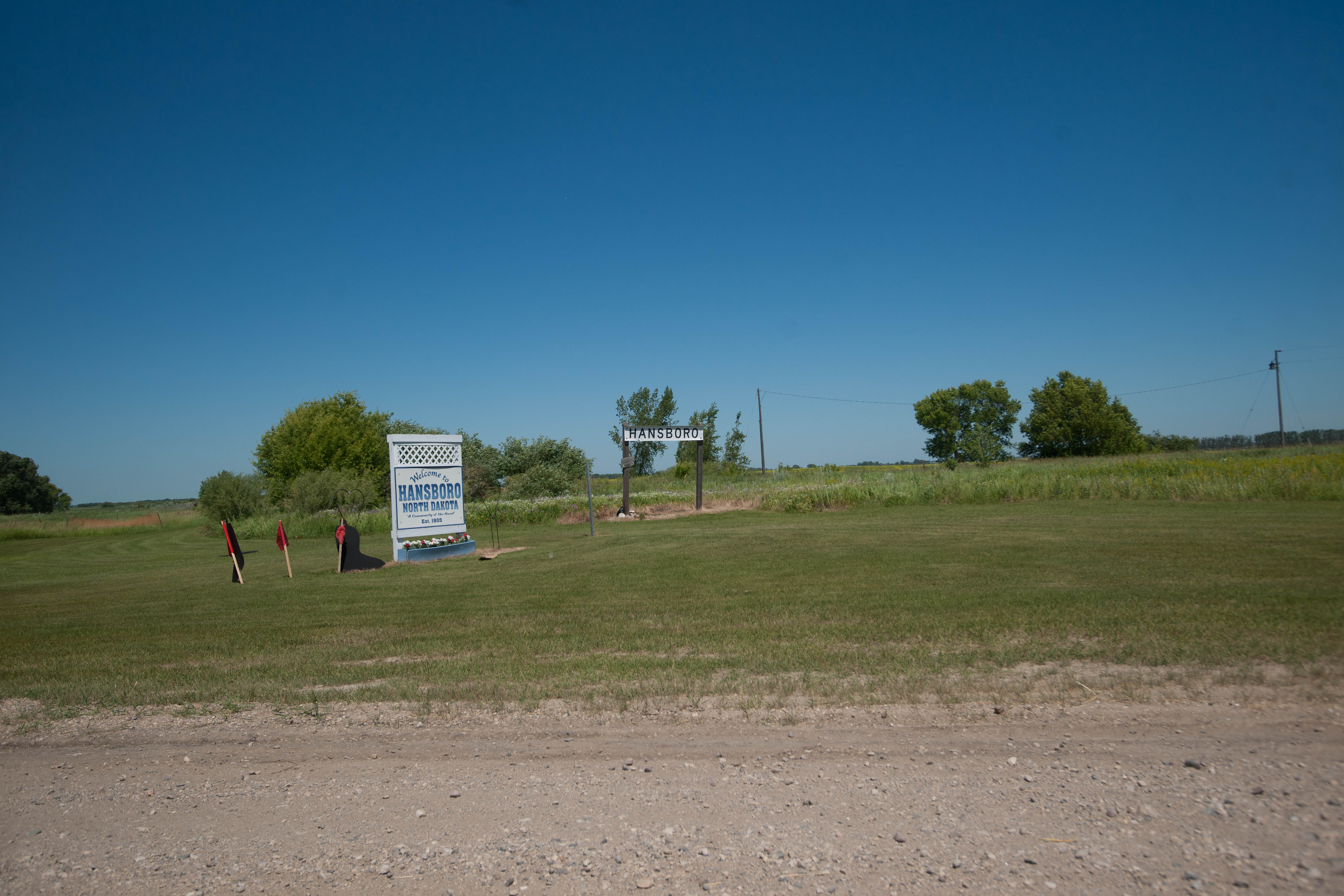
- Signs in Hansboro

- Location of Hansboro, North Dakota
- Coordinates: 48°57′08″N 99°22′48″W
- Country: United States
- State: North Dakota
- County: Towner
- Founded: 1905

Area
  - Total: 0.19 sq mi (0.49 km^{2})
  - Land: 0.19 sq mi (0.49 km^{2})
  - Water: 0 sq mi (0.00 km^{2})
- Elevation: 1,591 ft (485 m)

Population (2020)
  - Total: 15
  - Estimate (2022): 15
  - Density: 78.9/sq mi (30.45/km^{2})
- Time zone: UTC-6 (Central (CST))
  - Summer (DST): UTC-5 (CDT)
- ZIP code: 58339
- Area code: 701
- FIPS code: 38-35140
- GNIS feature ID: 1036081

Hansboro is a city in Towner County, North Dakota, United States. The population was 15 at the 2020 census.

== History ==
Hansboro was founded in 1905 when the railroad was extended to that point. The city was named for Henry C. Hansbrough, a North Dakota legislator. A post office was established at Hansboro in 1905, and remained in operation until 1967.

== Geography ==
According to the United States Census Bureau, the city has a total area of 0.19 square miles (0.49 km^{2}), all land.

== Demographics ==
Historical population
| Census | Pop. | Note | %± |
|---|---|---|---|
| 1920 | 218 | | — |
| 1930 | 176 | | −19.3% |
| 1940 | 196 | | 11.4% |
| 1950 | 134 | | −31.6% |
| 1960 | 143 | | 6.7% |
| 1970 | 49 | | −65.7% |
| 1980 | 43 | | −12.2% |
| 1990 | 20 | | −53.5% |
| 2000 | 8 | | −60.0% |
| 2010 | 12 | | 50.0% |
| 2020 | 15 | | 25.0% |
| 2022 (est.) | 15 | | 0.0% |
U.S. Decennial Census; 2020 Census

=== 2010 census ===
As of the census of 2010, there were 12 people, 8 households, and 4 families residing in the city. The population density was 63.2 inhabitants per square mile (24.4/km^{2}). There were 14 housing units at an average density of 73.7 per square mile (28.5/km^{2}). The racial makeup of the city was 100.0% White.

There were 8 households, of which 37.5% were married couples living together, 12.5% had a male householder with no wife present, and 50.0% were non-families. 50.0% of all households were made up of individuals, and 12.5% had someone living alone who was 65 years of age or older. The average household size was 1.50 and the average family size was 2.00.

The median age in the city was 49.5 years. 0.0% of residents were under the age of 18; 8.3% were between the ages of 18 and 24; 33.3% were from 25 to 44; 49.9% were from 45 to 64; and 8.3% were 65 years of age or older. The gender makeup of the city was 58.3% male and 41.7% female.

=== 2000 census ===
As of the census of 2000, there were 8 people, 5 households, and 1 family residing in the city. The population density was 43.0 inhabitants per square mile (16.6/km^{2}). There were 13 housing units at an average density of 69.9 per square mile (27.0/km^{2}). The racial makeup of the city was 100.00% White.

There were 5 households, out of which 20.0% had children under the age of 18 living with them, none were married couples living together, 20.0% had a female householder with no husband present, and 80.0% were non-families. 80.0% of all households were made up of individuals, and 20.0% had someone living alone who was 65 years of age or older. The average household size was 1.60 and the average family size was 4.00.

In the city, the population was spread out, with 37.5% under the age of 18, 12.5% from 18 to 24, 12.5% from 25 to 44, 25.0% from 45 to 64, and 12.5% who were 65 years of age or older. The median age was 33 years. For every 100 females, there were 60.0 males. For every 100 females age 18 and over, there were 150.0 males.

The median income for a household in the city was $13,750, and the median income for a family was $11,250. Males had a median income of $25,000 versus $0 for females. The per capita income for the city was $9,850. Below the poverty line were The family and 66.7% of the people were below the poverty line, including 100.0% of those under 18 and none of those over 64.

== Climate ==
This climatic region is typified by large seasonal temperature differences, with warm to hot (and often humid) summers and cold (sometimes severely cold) winters. According to the Köppen Climate Classification system, Hansboro has a humid continental climate, abbreviated "Dfb" on climate maps.

Climate data for Hansboro 4 NNE, North Dakota, 1991–2020 normals, 1908-2020 extremes: 1540ft (469m)
| Month | Jan | Feb | Mar | Apr | May | Jun | Jul | Aug | Sep | Oct | Nov | Dec | Year |
|---|---|---|---|---|---|---|---|---|---|---|---|---|---|
| Record high °F (°C) | 54 (12) | 60 (16) | 82 (28) | 96 (36) | 105 (41) | 103 (39) | 109 (43) | 105 (41) | 100 (38) | 93 (34) | 74 (23) | 65 (18) | 109 (43) |
| Mean maximum °F (°C) | 41.4 (5.2) | 42.6 (5.9) | 52.8 (11.6) | 75.3 (24.1) | 84.6 (29.2) | 87.7 (30.9) | 90.8 (32.7) | 93.8 (34.3) | 87.9 (31.1) | 77.7 (25.4) | 55.7 (13.2) | 41.3 (5.2) | 95.3 (35.2) |
| Mean daily maximum °F (°C) | 17.0 (−8.3) | 21.4 (−5.9) | 33.5 (0.8) | 51.6 (10.9) | 65.2 (18.4) | 74.8 (23.8) | 80.5 (26.9) | 80.0 (26.7) | 71.4 (21.9) | 54.3 (12.4) | 35.2 (1.8) | 22.1 (−5.5) | 50.6 (10.3) |
| Daily mean °F (°C) | 5.8 (−14.6) | 9.5 (−12.5) | 22.6 (−5.2) | 39.3 (4.1) | 52.4 (11.3) | 63.1 (17.3) | 67.6 (19.8) | 66.1 (18.9) | 57.2 (14.0) | 42.2 (5.7) | 24.7 (−4.1) | 12.0 (−11.1) | 38.5 (3.6) |
| Mean daily minimum °F (°C) | −5.3 (−20.7) | −2.4 (−19.1) | 11.8 (−11.2) | 27.1 (−2.7) | 39.6 (4.2) | 51.3 (10.7) | 54.8 (12.7) | 52.2 (11.2) | 42.9 (6.1) | 30.1 (−1.1) | 14.2 (−9.9) | 1.9 (−16.7) | 26.5 (−3.0) |
| Mean minimum °F (°C) | −29.4 (−34.1) | −25.6 (−32.0) | −11.7 (−24.3) | 11.2 (−11.6) | 24.0 (−4.4) | 35.8 (2.1) | 41.4 (5.2) | 38.5 (3.6) | 27.2 (−2.7) | 12.2 (−11.0) | −6.4 (−21.3) | −23.6 (−30.9) | −33.4 (−36.3) |
| Record low °F (°C) | −44 (−42) | −45 (−43) | −38 (−39) | −18 (−28) | 10 (−12) | 4 (−16) | 29 (−2) | 26 (−3) | 10 (−12) | −10 (−23) | −31 (−35) | −44 (−42) | −45 (−43) |
| Average precipitation inches (mm) | 0.47 (12) | 0.45 (11) | 0.92 (23) | 0.98 (25) | 2.68 (68) | 3.71 (94) | 2.37 (60) | 2.91 (74) | 1.76 (45) | 1.16 (29) | 0.77 (20) | 0.79 (20) | 18.97 (481) |
| Average snowfall inches (cm) | 5.70 (14.5) | 5.00 (12.7) | 5.70 (14.5) | 2.70 (6.9) | 0.50 (1.3) | 0.00 (0.00) | 0.00 (0.00) | 0.00 (0.00) | 0.00 (0.00) | 2.20 (5.6) | 6.60 (16.8) | 9.20 (23.4) | 37.6 (95.7) |
Source 1: NOAA
Source 2: XMACIS (temp records & 1981-2010 monthly max/mins)

== See also ==
- Hansboro–Cartwright Border Crossing
