= Gilbert Plains Municipality =

Rural municipality in Manitoba, Canada

Gilbert Plains
- Rural municipality
- Gilbert Plains Municipality
- Location of Gilbert Plains Municipality in Manitoba
- Coordinates: 51.150°N 100.489°W
- Country: Canada
- Province: Manitoba
- Region: Parkland
- Incorporated (amalgamated): January 1, 2015

Area
  - Total: 1,051.23 km^{2} (405.88 sq mi)

Population (2016)
  - Total: 1,470
  - Density: 1.40/km^{2} (3.62/sq mi)
- Time zone: UTC-6 (CST)
  - Summer (DST): UTC-5 (CDT)

Gilbert Plains Municipality is a rural municipality (RM) in the Canadian province of Manitoba.

== History ==
The RM was incorporated on January 1, 2015, via the amalgamation of the RM of Gilbert Plains and the Town of Gilbert Plains. It was formed as a requirement of The Municipal Amalgamations Act, which required that municipalities with a population less than 1,000 amalgamate with one or more neighbouring municipalities by 2015. The Government of Manitoba initiated these amalgamations in order for municipalities to meet the 1997 minimum population requirement of 1,000 to incorporate a municipality.

== Communities ==
- Ashville
- Gilbert Plains (unincorporated urban community)
- Halicz
- Venlaw
- Zoria

== Demographics ==
In the 2021 Census of Population conducted by Statistics Canada, Gilbert Plains had a population of 1,420 living in 634 of its 741 total private dwellings, a change of −3.4% from its 2016 population of 1,470. With a land area of 1,050.15 km^{2} (405.47 sq mi), it had a population density of 1.4/km^{2} (3.5/sq mi) in 2021.

== See also ==
- Gilbert Plains station
