= Municipality of Ste. Rose =

Rural municipality in Manitoba, Canada

Ste. Rose
- Rural municipality
- Municipality of Ste. Rose
- Location of the RM of Ste. Rose in Manitoba
- Coordinates: 51°01′20″N 99°25′50″W
- Country: Canada
- Province: Manitoba
- Region: Parkland
- Incorporated (amalgamated): January 1, 2015

Government
  - Mayor: Robert Brunel

Area
  - Land: 629.92 km^{2} (243.21 sq mi)

Population (2016)
  - Total: 1,712
  - Density: 2.718/km^{2} (7.039/sq mi)
- Time zone: UTC-6 (CST)
  - Summer (DST): UTC-5 (CDT)
- Website: sterose.ca

The Municipality of Ste. Rose (French: Municipalité de Sainte-Rose) is a rural municipality (RM) in the Canadian province of Manitoba.

== History ==
The RM was incorporated on January 1, 2015 via the amalgamation of the RM of Ste. Rose and the Town of Sainte Rose du Lac. It was formed as a requirement of The Municipal Amalgamations Act, which required that municipalities with a population less than 1,000 amalgamate with one or more neighbouring municipalities by 2015. The Government of Manitoba initiated these amalgamations in order for municipalities to meet the 1997 minimum population requirement of 1,000 to incorporate a municipality.

== Communities ==
- Laurier (designated place with railway station)
- Ste. Amélie
- Ste. Rose du Lac (unincorporated urban community)
- Valpoy

== Demographics ==
In the 2021 Census of Population conducted by Statistics Canada, Ste. Rose had a population of 1,591 living in 700 of its 764 total private dwellings, a change of −7.1% from its 2016 population of 1,712. With a land area of 630.04 km^{2} (243.26 sq mi), it had a population density of 2.5/km^{2} (6.5/sq mi) in 2021.

== Attractions ==
- Sainte Rose du Lac Airport

== See also ==
- List of francophone communities in Manitoba
