= Gilbert Plains =

Community in Manitoba, Canada

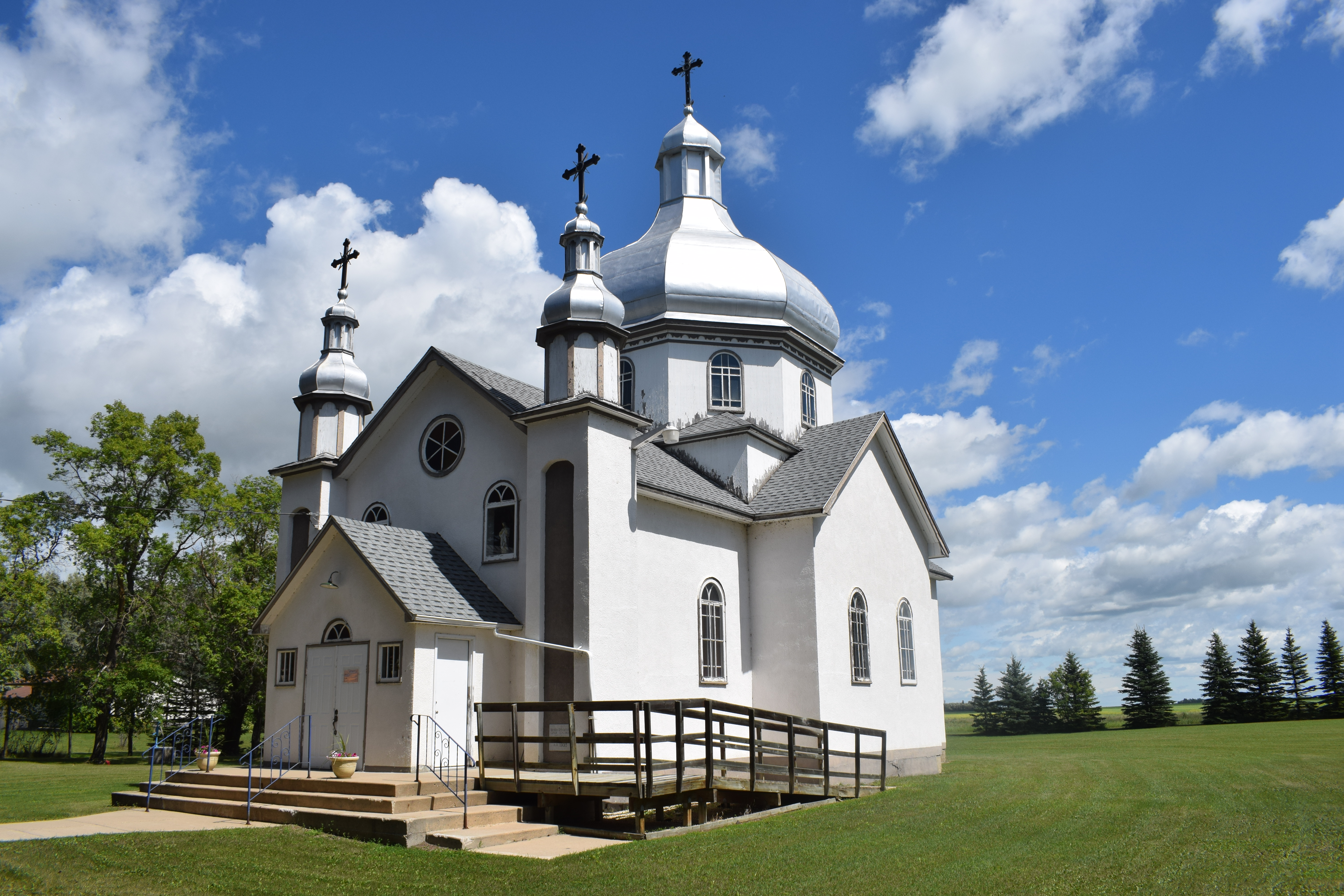
- Sacred Heart Ukrainian Catholic Church in Gilbert Plains, Manitoba.

- Location of Gilbert Plains in Manitoba
- Coordinates: 51°08′52″N 100°29′21″W
- Country: Canada
- Province: Manitoba
- Municipality: Gilbert Plains Municipality
- Census Division: No. 16

Government
  - MP: Dan Mazier
  - MLA: Ron Kostyshyn

Area
  - Total: 2.70 km^{2} (1.04 sq mi)

Population (2016)
  - Total: 785
  - Density: 291/km^{2} (750/sq mi)
  - Change 2011-16: ▼3.2%
- Time zone: UTC−6 (CST)
  - Summer (DST): UTC−5 (CDT)
- Postal Code: R0L 0C1, R0L 0X0
- Area code: 204
- Highways: PTH 5
- Railways: Canadian National
- NTS Map: 62N1 Dauphin
- GNBC Code: GBSLM

Gilbert Plains is an unincorporated urban community in the Gilbert Plains Municipality, Manitoba, Canada, that was classified as a town prior to January 1, 2015.

It is situated on the Valley River, in the Parkland Region between Riding Mountain National Park and Duck Mountain Provincial Park.

Gilbert Plains was featured during season 3 of the CBC program Still Standing. The episode originally aired on September 5, 2017.

== History ==
Incorporated in 1906, the original townsite was some miles to the south. The community was named for Gilbert Ross, a Métis man who was living in the region when the first European settler, Glenlyon Campbell, arrived.

On January 1, 2015, the Town of Gilbert Plains relinquished its town status when it amalgamated with the Rural Municipality of Gilbert Plains to form the Gilbert Plains Municipality.

== Demographics ==
In the 2021 Census of Population conducted by Statistics Canada, Gilbert Plains had a population of 773 living in 356 of its 407 total private dwellings, a change of −1.5% from its 2016 population of 785. With a land area of 2.74 km^{2} (1.06 sq mi), it had a population density of 282.1/km^{2} (730.7/sq mi) in 2021.

== Media ==
A local newspaper, The Exponent, served both Gilbert Plains and its neighboring town, Grandview. The Exponent closed on February 24, 2017, after 117 years of operation.

A weekly non-profit newspaper, The Plain View, published its first issue on 5 June 2018, and has been running ever since. It serves both Gilbert Plains and Grandview.

== Transportation ==
The community is located on Highway 5 and the CN railway line between Dauphin and Grandview, approximately 250 miles (400 km) northwest of Winnipeg. Gilbert Plains railway station is served by Via Rail's Winnipeg–Churchill train. The community previously had an airport.

== Climate ==
Climate data for Gilbert Plains
Month	Jan	Feb	Mar	Apr	May	Jun	Jul	Aug	Sep	Oct	Nov	Dec	Year
Record high °C (°F)	8.0 (46.4)	12.0 (53.6)	23.0 (73.4)	35.5 (95.9)	37.5 (99.5)	36.1 (97.0)	36.1 (97.0)	39.5 (103.1)	36.1 (97.0)	31.5 (88.7)	21.1 (70.0)	12.5 (54.5)	39.5 (103.1)
Mean daily maximum °C (°F)	−11.0 (12.2)	−7.7 (18.1)	−0.9 (30.4)	9.6 (49.3)	17.4 (63.3)	22.1 (71.8)	25.3 (77.5)	24.4 (75.9)	17.8 (64.0)	10.0 (50.0)	−1.3 (29.7)	−8.8 (16.2)	8.1 (46.6)
Daily mean °C (°F)	−16.6 (2.1)	−13.6 (7.5)	−6.9 (19.6)	3.0 (37.4)	10.3 (50.5)	15.6 (60.1)	18.5 (65.3)	17.2 (63.0)	11.1 (52.0)	4.0 (39.2)	−6.1 (21.0)	−13.9 (7.0)	1.9 (35.4)
Mean daily minimum °C (°F)	−22.1 (−7.8)	−19.5 (−3.1)	−12.8 (9.0)	−3.6 (25.5)	3.1 (37.6)	9.0 (48.2)	11.6 (52.9)	9.9 (49.8)	4.3 (39.7)	−2.1 (28.2)	−10.8 (12.6)	−18.9 (−2.0)	−4.3 (24.3)
Record low °C (°F)	−43.5 (−46.3)	−43.3 (−45.9)	−40.6 (−41.1)	−28.9 (−20.0)	−13.0 (8.6)	−3.5 (25.7)	−0.6 (30.9)	−1.5 (29.3)	−11.7 (10.9)	−20.0 (−4.0)	−38.9 (−38.0)	−40.0 (−40.0)	−43.5 (−46.3)
Average precipitation mm (inches)	20.2 (0.80)	15.1 (0.59)	29.1 (1.15)	28.1 (1.11)	58.9 (2.32)	85.6 (3.37)	76.4 (3.01)	70.2 (2.76)	53.3 (2.10)	36.4 (1.43)	23.6 (0.93)	24.4 (0.96)	524.4 (20.65)
Average rainfall mm (inches)	0.2 (0.01)	0.4 (0.02)	6.8 (0.27)	12.9 (0.51)	54.0 (2.13)	85.6 (3.37)	76.4 (3.01)	70.2 (2.76)	51.4 (2.02)	26.7 (1.05)	3.3 (0.13)	0.6 (0.02)	388.6 (15.30)
Average snowfall cm (inches)	20.0 (7.9)	14.7 (5.8)	22.2 (8.7)	15.2 (6.0)	4.9 (1.9)	0.0 (0.0)	0.0 (0.0)	0.0 (0.0)	1.8 (0.7)	9.7 (3.8)	20.4 (8.0)	24.4 (9.6)	132.8 (52.3)
Source: Environment Canada

== See also ==
- Gilbert Plains (electoral district)
