= Unorganized Division No. 17, Manitoba =

Coordinates: 51.266°N 100.007°W

Division No. 17, Unorganized is a Statistics Canada census subdivision of its Division No. 17, Manitoba, that consists of a part of the division that is not organized into either incorporated municipalities or Indian reserves.

== Geography ==
According to Statistics Canada, the census subdivision has a population of 101 (in 2011) and an area of 2,169.59 km^{2}.

== See also ==
- Riding Mountain National Park
