= Whitemud River =

River in Manitoba, Canada

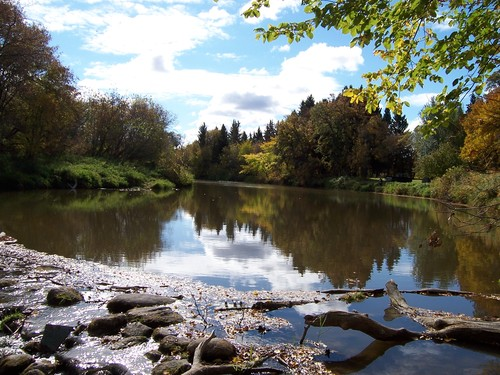
- Whitemud River in Westbourne

- Location within Manitoba

Location
- Country: Canada
- Province: Manitoba

Physical characteristics
- Mouth: Lake Manitoba
  - location: Lynchs Point
  - coordinates: 50°18′08″N 98°35′15″W
  - elevation: 247 m (810 ft)
- Basin size: 7,110 km^{2} (2,747 mi^{2})
- Discharge
  - location: Westbourne
  - average: 6.91 m^{3}/s (244 cu ft/s)
  - minimum: 0.107 m^{3}/s (3.8 cu ft/s)
  - maximum: 94.4 m^{3}/s (3,330 cu ft/s)

The Whitemud River is a small, highly meandering river in southwest Manitoba, Canada. It begins at the confluence of Stony Creek and Boggy Creek in Neepawa, and flows east to Arden, Gladstone, Westbourne, discharging into Lake Manitoba at Lynchs Point. Its total drainage area is 7,110 square kilometres (2,747 sq mi).

The fur trader Alexander Henry referred to it in 1799 as Riviere Terre Blanche, translated as "White Earth River" or "White Mud River", likely deriving its name from the colour of the clay and soil along its banks.

== Geography ==
Other major streams feeding the river include the Big Grass River, Pine Creek, Squirrel Creek, Westbourne Drain and Rat Creek.

The river's depth ranges from a few centimeters in the summer to several meters in flood events. Fish species known to inhabit the river include northern pike, white suckers, flathead minnows, emerald shiners, common carp and walleye.

Flows vary dramatically from year to year. The peak flow, measured at Westbourne in April 1979, was 310 cubic metres per second (11,100 cu ft/s), and zero flow has been measured on several occasions. Annual runoff volume has varied from 36,000,000 cubic metres (29,000 acre⋅ft) in 1989 to 611,000,000 cubic metres (495,000 acre⋅ft) in 2001. The mean annual volume at Westbourne is 199,000,000 cubic metres (161,000 acre⋅ft).

== History ==
Fur trader Alexander Henry referred to it in 1799 as Riviere Terre Blanche, translated as 'White Earth River' or 'White Mud River', likely deriving its name from the colour of the clay and soil along its banks. This clay, also found on alkaline flats or the mud on the lower river, would become greyish-white when used for plastering the chinks of log houses. In addition to the two translated English names, other variations of the river's name included White River (1808) and Little Mud River (1885). In 1933, its name was spelled as one word.

In the early 19th century, traders of the Hudson's Bay Company (HBC) would spend their winters at the mouth of the Whitemud River, along the shore of Lake Manitoba. In 1815, a winter fur-trade post was established there, called Big Point House or Manitoba Lake House. It was expanded in 1820, but abandoned by 1824.

Big Point House was in operation again from 1862 until circa 1894.

== See also ==
- List of rivers of Manitoba
