= Ashville, Manitoba =

Coordinates: 51°10′30″N 100°17′45″W

Location of Ashville in Manitoba

Ashville is an unincorporated community in the Rural Municipality of Gilbert Plains, Manitoba, Canada.

It is located along Highway 10 and the CPR tracks, 20 km (12 mi) north-west of the City of Dauphin. It lies at an elevation of 340 m (1,120 ft), south of the Valley River and north of the Riding Mountain National Park.

The community was named after Isaac Ashe Sr., a person of Irish descent who settled in the area.

The Ashville Formation, a stratigraphical unit of the Western Canadian Sedimentary Basin, was named for this community.

== See also ==
- List of communities in Manitoba
