= Alonsa =

Human settlement in Manitoba, Canada

Coordinates: 50°47′56″N 98°58′28″W

Alonsa is an unincorporated community recognized as a local urban district located in north central Manitoba in the Rural Municipality of Alonsa.

== History ==
Alonsa grew in the early 1900s with the coming of the railroad. The rail line was never extended beyond Alonsa and in 1961, the rail service ended. With the loss of the rail service, the population began to drop. The area is accessible now by Provincial Trunk Highway 50.

On August 3, 2018, an EF4 tornado touched down southeast of the town. It tossed vehicles and trailers and ripped a home from its foundation, killing 77-year-old Jack Furrie. It was the strongest tornado of 2018 and the first violent (EF4 or EF5) tornado in Canada since the 2007 Elie, Manitoba tornado.

== Recreation and attractions ==
Lake Manitoba is one of the largest attractions near Alonsa. The community attracts tourists headed to the lake for fishing or swimming.

The Alex Robertson Museum in Alonsa has a large collection of antique firearms and pioneer artifacts which is open to the public on Sundays and by appointment.
