= Manitoba House =

Coordinates: 50°52′00″N 98°51′32″W

Manitoba House is the name of a Hudson's Bay Company fur trading post as well as a separate settlement adjacent to the post. The site is in the present-day Rural Municipality of Alonsa.

== Trading post ==
The first trading post at or near the Manitoba House site was operated for one season, 1797–98, by a Hudson's Bay Company servant, John Best, somewhere near the Lake Manitoba Narrows. The name in the post journal, Doubtful Post, was likely chosen because of a lack of confidence in the survival of the post [Hudson's Bay Company Archives, B.53/a/1]. This post was indeed abandoned after this season, and the company had no permanent presence in the district for many years. Manitoba House, which was intended to serve a large area, between Riding Mountain and Lake Winnipeg, was established on the west side of Lake Manitoba, about 15 miles south of the Narrows, in the 1820s. Treaty 2 was signed on August 21, 1871, at Manitoba House. A number of notable individuals served at Manitoba House, including Isaac Cowie, as fur trader, and Archibald McDonald, as clerk.

== Settlement ==
The Metis settlement adjacent to the trading post was referred to as simply the Manitoba House Settlement until 1889 when the name Kinosota was suggested by John Norquay for the local post office. The settlement consists of a number of long narrow lots strung out along the shore of Lake Manitoba. St. Bede's Anglican Church, located in Kinosota, was formed in 1842 by Reverend Abraham Cowley, and is one of the oldest Anglican parishes in Manitoba. The church building was constructed around the turn of the century, and was moved to higher ground in 1922.
