= Mount Agassiz Ski Resort =

Ski resort in Manitoba, Canada

- Interactive map of Mount Agassiz Ski Resort
- Location: Riding Mountain National Park, Manitoba, Canada
- Nearest city: McCreary, Manitoba
- Coordinates: 50.761°N 99.675°W
- Vertical: 510 ft (160 m)
- Top elevation: 2,711 ft (826 m)
- Base elevation: 2,201 ft (671 m)
- Skiable area: 60 acres (0.2 km^{2})
- Trails: 15 30% - Easiest; 40% - More Difficult; 30% - Most Difficult
- Longest run: 1.6 km (1 mi)
- Lift system: 3 Surface Lifts, 1 Double Chairlift
- Website: Agassiz Mountain Development Group

Mount Agassiz Ski Resort was a ski resort located in Riding Mountain National Park near McCreary, Manitoba, that operated from 1961 to 2000. With a vertical drop of over 500 feet (150 m), it was in its time considered to offer some of the best skiing between the Rockies and Thunder Bay.

== History ==
Mount Agassiz was first developed in the late 1950s when around 142 hectares was leased to a private operator for the development of a ski resort. In 1961, the Mount Agassiz ski area officially opened with a rope tow, a handful of ski runs, and a new base lodge. In 1979 a new Skyway double chairlift was purchased and installed on the north side; this expansion included expert runs. The ski resort operated for many successful years and provided many economic benefits to the nearby town of McCreary. However, starting in the 1990s, there was a downturn in the number of skier visits. The owner filed for bankruptcy two times: once in 1995, and once in 2000. The ski area has not operated since 2000, despite a strong interest in rehabilitating it.

== Parks Canada Redevelopment ==
In 2007, Parks Canada introduced a new strategic goal for the Mount Agassiz Ski Resort, which precluded the possibility of reopening the ski resort. Although this motion was tabled, it still developed a negative reaction in the community. In January 2011, Parks Canada introduced a feasibility study for the future of the ski resort. It was estimated that it would cost over twenty million dollars to rehabilitate the ski resort. Only one party made a bid on the ski resort, which was denied by Parks Canada, citing it didn't meet all requirements. In 2014, Parks Canada made the decision to redevelop the former ski resort back into its natural state. Demolition of the lodge and ski lifts was completed by September 2015.
