= Municipality of McCreary =

Rural municipality in Manitoba, Canada

McCreary
- Rural municipality
- Municipality of McCreary
- Nickname: The Ski and Maple Syrup Capital of Manitoba
- Location of the RM of McCreary in Manitoba
- Coordinates: 50°44′58″N 99°29′06″W
- Country: Canada
- Province: Manitoba
- Region: Parkland
- Census division: No. 17
- Incorporated (amalgamated): January 1, 2015

Government
  - Reeve: Mike Gawaziuk

Area
  - Total: 527.77 km^{2} (203.77 sq mi)
- Elevation: 302 m (991 ft)

Population (2021)
  - Total: 748
  - Density: 1.42/km^{2} (3.67/sq mi)
- Time zone: UTC-6 (CST)
  - Summer (DST): UTC-5 (CDT)
- Postal code: R0J 1B0
- Website: exploremccreary.com

The Municipality of McCreary is a rural municipality (RM) in the Parkland Region of Manitoba, Canada.

Geographically located between Riding Mountain National Park and Lake Manitoba, the majority of the municipal lands are within the drainage basin of the Turtle River.

It is the self-proclaimed "Ski and Maple Syrup Capital of Manitoba."

== History ==
The RM was incorporated on January 1, 2015 via the amalgamation of the RM of McCreary and the Village of McCreary. It was formed as a requirement of The Municipal Amalgamations Act, which required that municipalities with a population less than 1,000 amalgamate with one or more neighbouring municipalities by 2015. The Government of Manitoba initiated these amalgamations in order for municipalities to meet the 1997 minimum population requirement of 1,000 to incorporate a municipality.

== Communities ==
- Glencairn
- McCreary (unincorporated urban community)
- Norgate
- Reeve

== Demographics ==
In the 2021 Census of Population conducted by Statistics Canada, McCreary had a population of 748 living in 345 of its 396 total private dwellings, a change of −16.1% from its 2016 population of 892. With a land area of 527.77 km^{2} (203.77 sq mi), it had a population density of 1.4/km^{2} (3.7/sq mi) in 2021.
