= Neepawa =

- Town
- Town of Neepawa
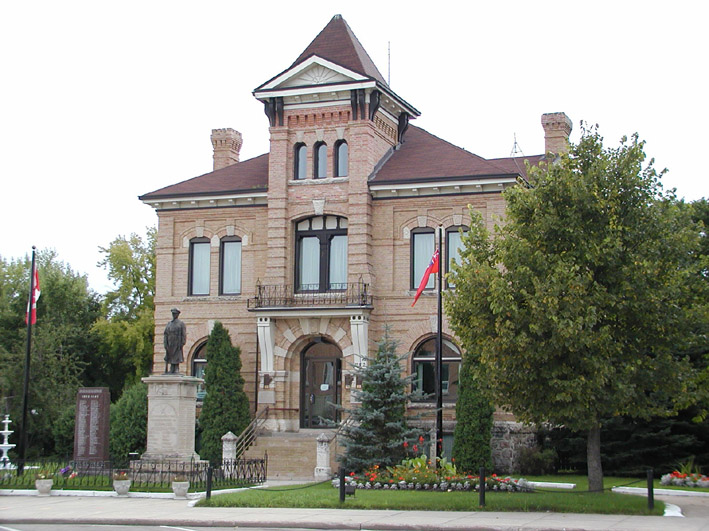
- Neepawa Courthouse

- Town boundaries

- Location in Manitoba
- Coordinates: 50°13′44″N 99°27′56″W
- Country: Canada
- Province: Manitoba
- Region: Westman
- Incorporated: 1883

Government
  - Mayor: Brian Hedley
  - Town Council: Neepawa Town Council
  - MLA Agassiz: Jodie Byram (PC)
  - MP Dauphin-Swan River-Neepawa: Dan Mazier (CPC)

Area
  - Total: 17.09 km^{2} (6.60 sq mi)
- Elevation: 358.1 m (1,175 ft)

Population (2021 Census)
  - Total: 5,685
  - Density: 332.7/km^{2} (862/sq mi)
- Time zone: UTC-6 (Central (CST))
  - Summer (DST): UTC-5 (Central (CDT))
- Postal code: R0J 1H0
- Area code: 204
- Website: www.neepawa.ca

Neepawa (/ˈniːpəwɑː/) is a town in Manitoba, Canada, on the Yellowhead Highway at the intersection with Highway 5.

As of 2021 its population was 5,685. Neepawa was incorporated as a town in 1883. Located in western Manitoba, it is bordered by the Municipality of North Cypress – Langford and Rural Municipality of Rosedale.

Neepawa is the self-proclaimed lily capital of the world in part because of its Lily Festival. The Lily Festival ran for 18 years beginning in 1996 and ending in 2014.

== Etymology ==
The town name of Neepawa comes from the Cree word for "Land of Plenty". The name was first used around 1873.

== History ==
In the many years before European settlement, the lands around Neepawa were primarily used by the Cree and the Assiniboine. Native peoples in the area followed a regular cycle by following the Plains Bison to take shelter in the areas north of Neepawa in the winter, and then heading south again across the plains and beyond Neepawa in the summer. Prior to settlement, the only Europeans in the area were primarily fur traders, many people made their way through the area on the North Fort Ellice Trail which went from the Red River to Edmonton. It was on this trail that a group of settlers from Listowel, Ontario, eventually decided to settle in 1877, where the Stony and Boggy creeks meet.

The Neepawa area was in what was then known as "The Northwest Territories", just to the west of the 1870 boundary of Manitoba. During the next 30 years, many settlers came to live in the area. The first settlers were from the British Isles. Eastern European settlers also came from countries such as Poland and Hungary and built the Hun Valley Settlement near Neepawa. Neepawa only joined Manitoba when the western edge of the then "postage stamp province" was expanded to its present western borders in 1881.

John A. Davidson and Jonathon J. Hamilton arrived in the town in 1880, they were the first real business men of the town buying land and surveying them into lots. In 1881 John Hamilton and John Davidson built a store and a grist mill near the junction of Boggy and Stoney Creeks. Like many western Manitoba towns at the time, Neepawa eagerly await the arrival of the railway in the 1880s. Sometime after the railway reached Gladstone, Manitoba in 1882, Davidson and Hamilton offered the Manitoba and Northwestern Railway (which was leased to CPR) a land grant and a financial bonus of $16,000 to construct their line within the town limits and the railway agreed to build their station within Neepawa.

Soon a village grew and on the 23 of September, 1883 the town of Neepawa was incorporated. David Howard Harrison who owned a private bank in Neepawa was elected Premier of Manitoba in 1887. Neepawa's first hospital was completed in 1904 and had the capacity for 20 patients. The hospital included a nursing school. Neepawa's first school opened in 1881. It was a three-story building finally completed in 1898 and used until 1928. The Neepawa Salt Company mined salt here from 1932 until 1970.

Author Margaret Laurence wrote several books through the 1960s and 1970s, depicting the town under the name of Manawaka. On May 12, 2010 Neepawa was the host of Manitoba's 140th birthday party. The town was chosen as the site of the festivities as a result of winning a contest within the province.

Between the years of 2011 and 2016, the population of Neepawa jumped by almost 27%, following an influx of Filipino immigrants, brought over by the establishment of a local pork processing plant.

== Geography ==
Neepawa lies on the Manitoba Escarpment, the rolling hills around Neepawa are typical of the escarpment. Neepawa lies within the Canadian Prairies, the region around Neepawa is defined as Aspen parkland. Although Neepawa is part of the prairies the area to the north is heavily forested parkland. Riding Mountain National Park and Duck Mountain Provincial Park lie to the north, are part of this parkland, and are also an extension of the escarpment. The boreal forest which extends all the way across Canada and is also found to the north of Neepawa. Spruce Woods Provincial Park is located about 60 km south of the town.

Neepawa lies at the source of the Whitemud River, it is also about 40 km east of the Little Saskatchewan River, a tributary of the Assiniboine River which is 60 km south of the town. The town is also about 60 km west of Lake Manitoba, one of the largest lakes in Manitoba.

=== Climate ===
Climate data for Neepawa Water
Month	Jan	Feb	Mar	Apr	May	Jun	Jul	Aug	Sep	Oct	Nov	Dec	Year
Record high °C (°F)	7 (45)	10 (50)	17 (63)	34 (93)	36 (97)	37 (99)	36 (97)	37.5 (99.5)	35.5 (95.9)	30 (86)	20.6 (69.1)	8.3 (46.9)	37.5 (99.5)
Mean daily maximum °C (°F)	−11.9 (10.6)	−8 (18)	−0.9 (30.4)	9.4 (48.9)	17.9 (64.2)	22.4 (72.3)	24.8 (76.6)	24.2 (75.6)	17.7 (63.9)	10.4 (50.7)	−1 (30)	−9.3 (15.3)	8 (46)
Mean daily minimum °C (°F)	−22.2 (−8.0)	−18.5 (−1.3)	−11.2 (11.8)	−2.6 (27.3)	5.1 (41.2)	10.6 (51.1)	13 (55)	11.5 (52.7)	6.1 (43.0)	−0.1 (31.8)	−9.4 (15.1)	−18.9 (−2.0)	−3.1 (26.4)
Record low °C (°F)	−41 (−42)	−42.5 (−44.5)	−36 (−33)	−27.2 (−17.0)	−12 (10)	0 (32)	3 (37)	0 (32)	−6 (21)	−21 (−6)	−34 (−29)	−42 (−44)	−42.5 (−44.5)
Average precipitation mm (inches)	20.1 (0.79)	14.6 (0.57)	24.4 (0.96)	35 (1.4)	58.4 (2.30)	79.5 (3.13)	82 (3.2)	70.4 (2.77)	57.9 (2.28)	31.3 (1.23)	20.8 (0.82)	22 (0.9)	516.3 (20.33)
Source: Environment Canada

== Demographics ==
Historical population
Year	Pop.	±%
1891	774	—
1901	1,418	+83.2%
1911	1,864	+31.5%
1921	1,887	+1.2%
1931	1,910	+1.2%
1941	2,292	+20.0%
1951	2,895	+26.3%
1961	3,197	+10.4%
1996	3,301	+3.3%
2001	3,325	+0.7%
2006	3,298	−0.8%
2011	3,629	+10.0%
2016	4,609	+27.0%
2021	5,685	+23.3%
Department of Agriculture,

In the 2021 Census of Population conducted by Statistics Canada, Neepawa had a population of 5,685 living in 1,866 of its 1,946 total private dwellings, a change of 23.3% from its 2016 population of 4,609. With a land area of 17.09 km^{2} (6.60 sq mi), it had a population density of 332.7/km^{2} (861.6/sq mi) in 2021.

Panethnic groups in the Town of Neepawa (2001−2021)
Panethnic group	2021		2016		2011		2006		2001	
Panethnic group	Pop.	%	Pop.	%	Pop.	%	Pop.	%	Pop.	%
Southeast Asian (Note: Statistic includes total responses of "Filipino" and "Southeast Asian" under visible minority section on census.)	2,655	47.88%	1,680	38.71%	320	9.41%	0	0%	10	0.31%
European (Note: Statistic includes all persons that did not make up part of a visible minority or an indigenous identity.)	2,355	42.47%	2,440	56.22%	2,810	82.65%	3,040	96.2%	3,090	96.71%
Indigenous	250	4.51%	135	3.11%	60	1.76%	120	3.8%	55	1.72%
African	90	1.62%	30	0.69%	0	0%	0	0%	15	0.47%
South Asian	45	0.81%	0	0%	35	1.03%	0	0%	0	0%
East Asian (Note: Statistic includes total responses of "Chinese", "Korean", and "Japanese" under visible minority section on census.)	30	0.54%	45	1.04%	70	2.06%	0	0%	10	0.31%
Latin American	30	0.54%	10	0.23%	90	2.65%	0	0%	0	0%
Middle Eastern (Note: Statistic includes total responses of "West Asian" and "Arab" under visible minority section on census.)	0	0%	0	0%	0	0%	0	0%	0	0%
Other/multiracial (Note: Statistic includes total responses of "Visible minority, n.i.e." and "Multiple visible minorities" under visible minority section on census.)	95	1.71%	20	0.46%	0	0%	0	0%	20	0.63%
Total responses	5,545	97.54%	4,340	94.16%	3,400	93.69%	3,160	95.82%	3,195	96.09%
Total population	5,685	100%	4,609	100%	3,629	100%	3,298	100%	3,325	100%
Note: Totals greater than 100% due to multiple origin responses

== Economy ==
The economy of Neepawa and the region is strongly dependent on agriculture. The rolling fields in the area support many types of crops and livestock operations. Neepawa serves as a major agricultural service centre for many of the producers in the region.

HyLife Foods Inc (formerly Hytec) purchased the Neepawa pork processing plant in 2008 and since then has grown the company to be the largest employer in the area processing 7000 hogs per day. Since 2008, employment has grown from 400 to 1600 people, driving Neepawa's growth as the third fastest growing community in Manitoba. (www.chooseneepawa.ca)

As well as being an agricultural centre, Neepawa's businesses serve as a shopping and retail centre for much of the area's residents.

== Attractions ==
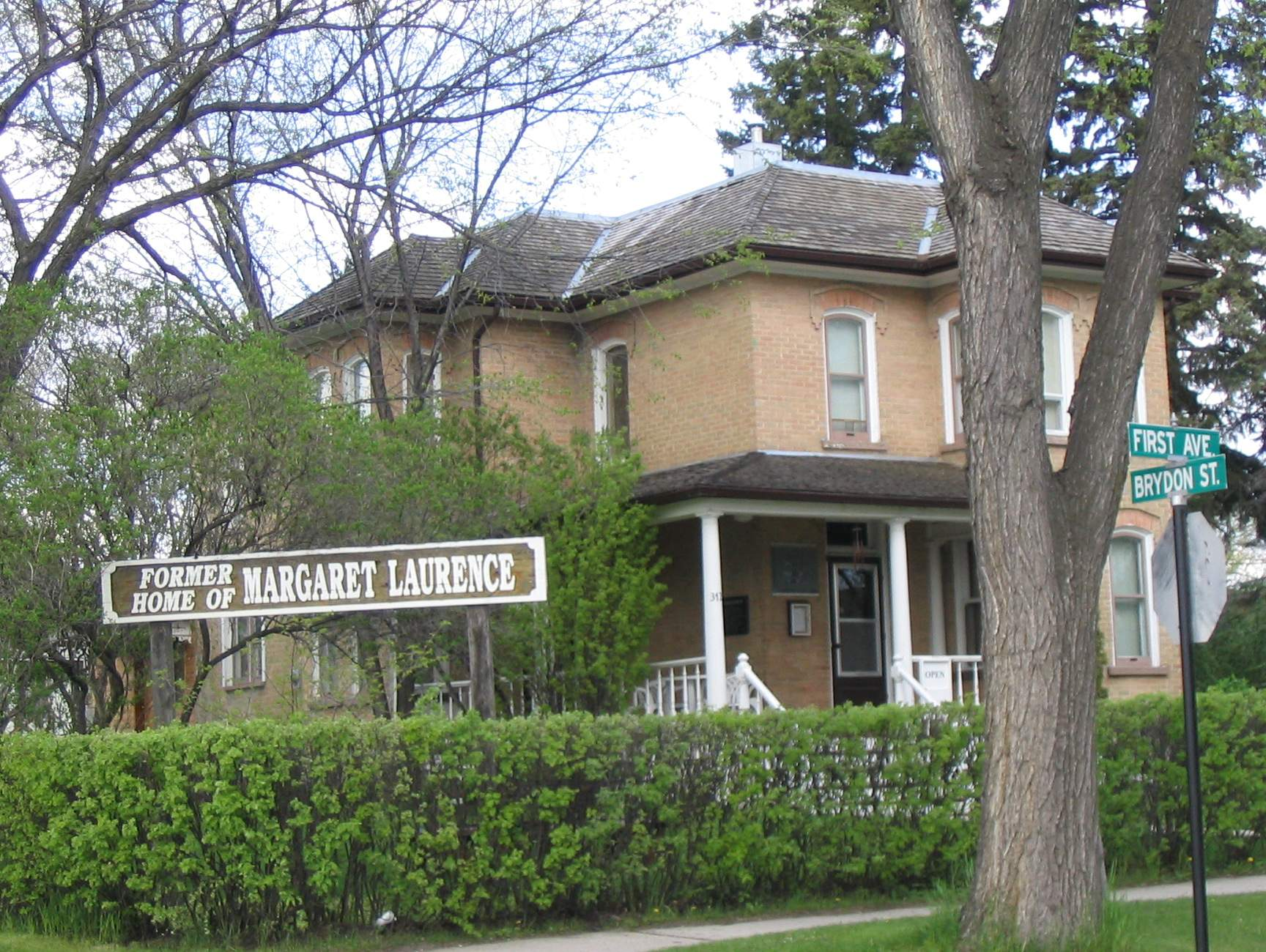
Margaret Laurence Home

The Margaret Laurence House is a designated Provincial Heritage Site and a Level 2 Museum. This is the house where Margaret Laurence grew up in Neepawa as a youth. In addition the Riverside Cemetery in Neepawa is the resting place of Margaret Laurence. The cemetery's Davidson Memorial was the signature of Laurence's book The Stone Angel. This cemetery is also the furthest west in which any Titanic passenger was buried. Four young men from the village of Fritham in Hampshire, England, went down with the Titanic in 1912: Lewis Hickman (aged 32), Leonard Mark Hickman (aged 24), Stanley George Hickman (aged 21), and Ambrose Hood (aged 21). A gravestone in memory of the Hickman brothers can be found in Riverside Cemetery. The Beautiful Plains Museum is a heritage railway station that was the home of the museum since 1981. The original railway station was built in 1901.

The Roxy Theatre Neepawa is a community-run theatre that was built in 1906. The theatre hosts live arts and films. The Roxy Theatre was the setting for the 2015 film Amityville Playhouse (UK/Europe release) or Amityville Theatre (U.S. release). Both the Roxy and the Towns Court House were used in the film (as were other locations in the town) which was shot in September 2014.

== Sports ==
=== Yellowhead Centre ===
The Yellowhead Centre is a 1,200-seat arena, built in 1972. It serves the Town of Neepawa and surrounding municipalities. It is home to a number of local recreational and minor hockey teams, as well as the Neepawa Titans (Manitoba Junior Hockey League), Neepawa Farmers (Tiger Hills Senior Hockey League), and Neepawa Area Collegiate Institute Tigers (high school hockey). The Yellowhead Chiefs male and female midget 'AAA' hockey teams both play some home games in Neepawa.

Aside from hockey, the Yellowhead Centre has also hosted major curling events, most notably the 2009 Manitoba Scotties Tournament of Hearts and the 2013 Safeway Championship.

== Government ==
Neepawa is governed by a town council consisting of a mayor and six councilors. The town council is elected to a four-year term. The current mayor of Neepawa is Darryl Gerrard. The Deputy Mayor is Murray Parrott and the remaining council consists of Jason Nadeau, Dave Clark, Zaldy Paguidopon, Jeffery Miner and Rafael Flores.

== Transportation ==
Neepawa is located along Highway 16 (the Yellowhead Highway) and Highway 5 (the Parks Route). Neepawa Airport features a 3,500 feet (1,100 m) runway that is able to service air ambulance and small jets.

== Education ==
Hazel M. Kellington Elementary School (named after long-time teacher) has about 380 students, the Neepawa Middle School, opened 29 January 2020 has as of 2024 accumulated about 440 students and the Neepawa Area Collegiate Institute has about 450 students. Alongside with the Neepawa Area Colliegate, Neepawa is also receiving a new Vocational High School for 9 - 12, nearby the also new Neepawa Regional Hospital. Neepawa Nursery School teaches 3- and 4-year-old children. Neepawa is part of the Beautiful Plains School Division.

In 2023, Neepawa updated the former RCMP detachment into the Neepawa Training Centre. Assiniboine College is a tenant and offers, various college programs and adult education.

== Media ==
=== Radio ===
- CJBP-FM 97.1

=== Television ===
- NAC TV channel 30

== Notable people ==
- Gordon Beard, politician
- Bertram Brooker, award-winning novelist
- Shawn Byram, former professional hockey player
- Glen Cummings (politician), politician
- Fred Langdon Davis, politician
- Triston Grant, former professional hockey player
- Charles F. Goodeve, chemist
- Shane Hnidy, former professional hockey player
- James H. Howden, politician
- Mark Kolesar, former professional hockey player
- Margaret Laurence, novelist
- Bill Mikkelson, former professional hockey player
- Kelly Robertson, professional curler
- Welford Russell, composer and surgeon
- Bill Stilwell, author
- David Zieroth, poet
