= Ebb and Flow First Nation =

Coordinates: 51.054°N 99.016°W

Ebb and Flow First Nation Band No. 280 Gaa-Gwekwekejiwang
- People: Anishinaabe
- Treaty: Treaty 2

Land
- Main reserve: Ebb and Flow 52

Population
- On reserve: 1869
- Total population: 3,268

Government
- Chief: Wayne Desjarlais

Tribal Council
- West Region Tribal Council

Website
- www.ebbandflowfn.com

Ebb and Flow First Nation (Ojibwe: Gaa-gwekwekejiwang) is an Anishinaabe First Nations community in Manitoba. It is located on the eponymous Ebb and Flow Lake, northeast of Riding Mountain National Park. It is about 180 km from Winnipeg, and lies on the west side of Lake Manitoba, on Manitoba Provincial Road 278.

The reserve is known as Ebb and Flow 52, which is surrounded by the Rural Municipality of Alonsa.

== Crises ==
=== 2016 asbestos crisis ===
In March 2016, Ebb and Flow School was found to contain dangerous amounts of Asbestos. For many years before the findings, staff made reports of symptoms including headaches and dizziness. The school was shut down but classes resumed at the local community complex until it was safe to return.

=== 2025 wildfire ===
In May 2025, Ebb and Flow First Nation had a record-breaking wildfire season, the band had to issue a State of emergency. It was also believed that a standby evacuation was in place, with the help of many fire crews coming from surrounding communities the fire was put out the same day.

=== 2025 water crisis ===
In January–February 2025, Ebb and Flow First Nation had a water crisis resulting in weeks without water, weeks of no school, and weeks of waiting. With the help of the band, free jugs of water were handed out to community members that were affected by the water crisis.

== New Changes ==
In the spring of 2022, Ebb and Flow introduced a new elementary school after years of meetings and planning. The project cost 55 million dollars to build with the help of NDL and Architecture 49. The building was completed in 2024 with classes starting in September 2024. The Grand Opening was in October with an indoor feast for all students, and for a time where the High School students can take a look at the finished school.

The Ebb and Flow High School which is the old building which used to take in K-12 students was renovated and now accommodates 7-12 students with a new cafeteria, 4 new classes for High School, an extension on the north wing, and a new tipi entrance.

A new splash pad was built for children and was finished in 2025, and opened in 2025, the new splash pad is located at the north end of Central RD.

== Notable people ==
- Kyle Edwards, writer and journalist

== See also ==
- List of Indian reserves in Canada
- Treaty 2
