= Rural Municipality of Alonsa =

Rural municipality in Manitoba, Canada

Alonsa
- Rural municipality
- Rural Municipality of Alonsa
- Location of Alonsa in Manitoba
- Coordinates: 50.7996°N 98.9766°W
- Country: Canada
- Province: Manitoba
- Region: Parkland
- Incorporated as an LGD: January 1, 1945
- Incorporated as a rural municipality: January 1, 1997

Government
  - Reeve: Tom Anderson
  - Councillors: Kerry Hopfner; Tim Stott; Travis Turko; Michael Brown; Terry Dayholos; Logan Dumanske

Area
  - Total: 2,977.50 km^{2} (1,149.62 sq mi)

Population (2021)
  - Total: 1,210
- Time zone: UTC-6 (CST)
  - Summer (DST): UTC-5 (CDT)
- Website: rmofalonsa.com

Alonsa is a rural municipality (RM) in the province of Manitoba, western Canada. It lies on the west side of Lake Manitoba.

Located within the borders of the municipality is the Indian reserve of Ebb and Flow 52, as well as the 60,000 m^{2} (6 ha) Margaret Bruce Beach Provincial Park, located 12 km (7.5 mi) east of the town of Alonsa, on one of a series of sand ridges that extend the length of the west side lake. The park is currently under lease to a private operator but development plans include a provincial campground and day use facility.

The municipality is also home to a prehistoric stone circle known as a "Thunderbird Nest", thought to be the most westerly example in Manitoba.

The incorporation of Alonsa on 1 January 1945 was as a Local Government District (LGD). It received rural municipality status on 1 January 1997.

== 2018 Tornado ==
A violent high end EF4 tornado struck the municipality of Alonsa on August 3, 2018, killing 1 person. It was estimated to have been on the ground for over 20 minutes, and had a width of 800 m (2,600 feet). The tornado was originally rated EF4, but further research has suggested the windspeeds inside the tornado ranging from 317 km/h (197 miles per hour) to 450 km/h (280 miles per hour), putting it as an EF5 tornado.

== Communities ==
- Alonsa
- Amaranth
- Bacon Ridge
- Bluff Creek
- Cayer
- Eddystone
- Harcus
- Kinosota (Manitoba House)
- Leifur
- Lonely Lake
- Moore Dale
- Portia
- Reedy Creek
- Reykjavik (Icelandic: Reykjavík)
- Shergrove
- Silver Ridge

== Demographics ==
In the 2021 Census of Population conducted by Statistics Canada, Alonsa had a population of 1,210 living in 492 of its 659 total private dwellings, a change of −3% from its 2016 population of 1,247. With a land area of 3,006.17 km^{2} (1,160.69 sq mi), it had a population density of 0.4/km^{2} (1.0/sq mi) in 2021.

== See also ==
- Scarth, Manitoba
- Elie, Manitoba
- Pipestone, Manitoba
- 2007 Elie tornado
