= McCreary, Manitoba =

McCreary
- Unincorporated urban community
- Location of McCreary in Manitoba
- Coordinates: 50°46′20″N 99°29′35″W
- Country: Canada
- Province: Manitoba
- Region: Parkland
- Municipality: McCreary
- Incorporated: 1 January 1964
- Amalgamated: 2015
- Named for: William McCreary

Government
  - Reeve: Mike Gawaziuk
  - MP (Dauphin—Swan River—Neepawa): Dan Mazier
  - MLA (Agassiz): Jodie Byram

Area
  - Total: 1.84 km^{2} (0.71 sq mi)
- Elevation: 351 m (1,152 ft)

Population (2021)
  - Total: 497
  - Density: 270/km^{2} (700/sq mi)
- Time zone: UTC-6 (Central (CST))
  - Summer (DST): UTC-5 (Central (CDT))
- Area code: 204

McCreary is an unincorporated urban community in the Municipality of McCreary, Manitoba, Canada.

Settled as early as the 19th century, it was incorporated in 1964 as a village—a status it lost upon amalgamating with the Municipality of McCreary on 1 January 2015.

McCreary covers an area of 1.70 km^{2}, and has a population of 472. As the self-proclaimed "Ski Capital of Manitoba," the former village previously held significance as the closest settlement to the former Mount Agassiz Ski Area.

== History ==
McCreary was named for the surrounding Municipality of McCreary, both of which share their name with the local post office, which adopted the name in 1899 from William McCreary.

McCreary was incorporated as a village in 1964, but was amalgamated into the Municipality of McCreary on 1 January 2015.

== Geography ==
McCreary is located in the Parkland region of Manitoba. It is located on flat prairie land, but lies immediately east of Riding Mountain National Park.

=== Climate ===
McCreary has a humid continental climate (Köppen Dfb) with cold winters and warm summers. Average daytime temperatures range from 25.0 °C (77.0 °F) in July to −9.3 °C (15.3 °F) in January. McCreary gets an average 539 millimetres (21.2 in) of precipitation annually, noticeably wetter than other areas of the Parkland region. There is measurable rainfall 80.1 days of the year on average, and measurable snowfall 46.9 days of the year. McCreary’s average winter daytime highs and record highs, are among the highest in Manitoba due to the Foehn wind effect of downslope winds from nearby Riding Mountain, which can cause a local warming effect. Nearby Wasagaming is over 900 feet (275 metres) higher in elevation. McCreary’s January daytime average high is 0.7 °C warmer than Morden despite being 200 kilometres northwest of Morden.

Climate data for McCreary (1981-2010)
Month	Jan	Feb	Mar	Apr	May	Jun	Jul	Aug	Sep	Oct	Nov	Dec	Year
Record high humidex	13.7	10.7	18.7	28.9	34.0	44.7	47.2	47.5	41.1	27.5	23.0	11.8	47.5
Record high °C (°F)	14.5 (58.1)	16.0 (60.8)	24.0 (75.2)	34.5 (94.1)	36.0 (96.8)	38.0 (100.4)	36.7 (98.1)	38.5 (101.3)	37.5 (99.5)	32.5 (90.5)	24.4 (75.9)	14.5 (58.1)	38.5 (101.3)
Mean daily maximum °C (°F)	−9.3 (15.3)	−6.3 (20.7)	−0.1 (31.8)	9.9 (49.8)	17.3 (63.1)	22.0 (71.6)	25.0 (77.0)	24.2 (75.6)	18.1 (64.6)	10.2 (50.4)	−0.2 (31.6)	−7.2 (19.0)	8.6 (47.5)
Daily mean °C (°F)	−14.8 (5.4)	−11.9 (10.6)	−5.4 (22.3)	3.8 (38.8)	10.8 (51.4)	16.2 (61.2)	19.2 (66.6)	18.2 (64.8)	12.3 (54.1)	4.9 (40.8)	−4.8 (23.4)	−12.2 (10.0)	3.0 (37.4)
Mean daily minimum °C (°F)	−20.3 (−4.5)	−17.3 (0.9)	−10.6 (12.9)	−2.3 (27.9)	4.3 (39.7)	10.3 (50.5)	13.3 (55.9)	12.1 (53.8)	6.4 (43.5)	−0.4 (31.3)	−9.3 (15.3)	−17.2 (1.0)	−2.6 (27.4)
Record low °C (°F)	−40.6 (−41.1)	−41.0 (−41.8)	−35.4 (−31.7)	−27.0 (−16.6)	−10.5 (13.1)	−1.1 (30.0)	0.6 (33.1)	1.0 (33.8)	−6.5 (20.3)	−19.5 (−3.1)	−35.0 (−31.0)	−39.5 (−39.1)	−41.0 (−41.8)
Record low wind chill	−50	−49	−45	−24	−13	−4	0	0	−10	−18	−32	−44	−50
Average precipitation mm (inches)	21.5 (0.85)	18.1 (0.71)	33.7 (1.33)	29.8 (1.17)	62.7 (2.47)	87.6 (3.45)	74.2 (2.92)	61.9 (2.44)	58.2 (2.29)	42.7 (1.68)	25.9 (1.02)	22.7 (0.89)	539 (21.22)
Average rainfall mm (inches)	0.0 (0.0)	0.8 (0.03)	7.9 (0.31)	16.6 (0.65)	62.1 (2.44)	87.6 (3.45)	74.2 (2.92)	61.9 (2.44)	57.9 (2.28)	34.7 (1.37)	6.4 (0.25)	0.9 (0.04)	411 (16.18)
Average snowfall cm (inches)	26.1 (10.3)	19.5 (7.7)	28.1 (11.1)	12.3 (4.8)	0.6 (0.2)	0.0 (0.0)	0.0 (0.0)	0.0 (0.0)	0.3 (0.1)	8.4 (3.3)	22.6 (8.9)	27.3 (10.7)	145.2 (57.1)
Average precipitation days (≥ 0.2 mm)	10.3	8.5	9.1	7.8	11.5	14.5	12.9	11.9	11.3	9.3	8.5	10	125.6
Average rainy days (≥ 0.2 mm)	0.07	0.37	2.4	5.7	11.4	14.5	12.9	11.9	11.2	7.5	1.7	0.54	80.1
Average snowy days (≥ 0.2 cm)	10.2	7.9	7.2	2.5	0.41	0	0	0	0.07	2	7.2	9.6	46.9
Source: Environment Canada

== Demographics ==
In the 2021 Census of Population conducted by Statistics Canada, McCreary had a population of 497 living in 232 of its 273 total private dwellings, a change of −2% from its 2016 population of 507. With a land area of 1.84 km^{2} (0.71 sq mi), it had a population density of 270.1/km^{2} (699.6/sq mi) in 2021.

In the 2011 Canadian census, the median age was 58.1 years old, 17.5 years older than the national average of 40.6. There were 250 private dwellings, 228 of which were occupied.

English is the main language used in McCreary, being spoken fluently by virtually all of the population. In terms of Canada's official languages, 92.1% of the population speaks exclusively English, while 6.8% also speaks French. Other languages spoken as a mother tongue include Ukrainian (3.4%), German (2.2%), Tagalog (1.1%), and Ojibwe (1.1%), though only Ukrainian sees regular use at home, by 1.1% of the population.

Of those in McCreary aged 15 or over, 60.5% are married or living with a common-law partner, 17.3% have never been married, 2.5% are separated, 6.2% are divorced, and 13.6% are widowed.

== Attractions ==
=== Recreation ===
McCreary was formerly known for the nearby Mount Agassiz Ski Area at Riding Mountain National Park which opened in 1961 (and renovated for the 1979 Canada Winter Games at the cost of nearly $500,000). Despite previously holding the position as the only ski "mountain" (as opposed to valley) in Canada between Thunder Bay and the Rocky Mountains, Mount Agassiz closed in 2000 after its owner's bankruptcy. Attempts to re-open Mount Agassiz as recent as 2015 with the purpose of reviving tourism in the area fell through, and the old structures at the site have been demolished, though Parks Canada is still taking proposals for the site.

In contemporary times, the former village still features some public recreational facilities, including a tennis court shared with McCreary School, a curling arena, three baseball diamonds and a swimming pool. Though McCreary now lacks facilities for downhill skiing, several trails for cross-country skiing are available in the winter.

=== Culture ===
The Burrows Trail Arts Council has provided professional performances, visual art exhibitions, workshops and classes to the area including McCreary since 1986. It was named for the historical Burrows Trail that ran through McCreary.

The McCreary and District Library rotates with the collections of other libraries included in the Parkland Library Service, and contains over 15,000 volumes, as well as mobile and local art collections and two public computers with Internet service.

== Sports ==
McCreary played a role in the 1979 Canada Winter Games, as some events were held at the nearby Mount Agassiz Ski Area.

McCreary Centennial Arena is a predominant outlet for sports in the area, hosting ice hockey teams under Hockey Manitoba, as well as broomball teams.

McCreary is also known for its history in the sport of curling.

== Government ==
Prior to 2015, McCreary was represented by a mayor from the time of its incorporation in 1964.

Now being amalgamated with the surrounding municipality, McCreary is represented by a council consisting of a reeve and six councillors. The present reeve, Mike Gawaziuk, was elected to office in 2018. The previous reeve, Larry McLauchlan, was elected in 2015, and prior to that served as reeve of the former Rural Municipality of McCreary from 2007. The remaining council consists of councillors Clayton Kohlman, Allan Whyte, Dave Smith, Linda Cripps, Shawn Buchanan, and Coreen Roy.

The former village lies within the federal riding of Dauphin—Swan River—Neepawa, which is represented by MP Dan Mazier, a member of the Conservative Party of Canada. Provincially, it lies within the riding of Agassiz, which is represented in the Manitoba Legislative Assembly by MLA Jodie Byram, a member of the Progressive Conservative Party of Manitoba.

== Transportation ==
Historically, passenger and mail service in the area was available by stagecoach from 1891 until 1903. The service ran along the Burrows Trail, an early north-south thoroughfare through the Parkland area that was constructed by the federal government to facilitate settlement of the region. Motorized taxi service began in 1910, and in starting in 1929, the village was serviced by a bus from Winnipeg that stopped at towns along Manitoba Highway 5. The village was served by the Canadian National Railway from 1912 to 1982. While the village is no longer serviced by CN, the station remains intact today as a historical site.

In contemporary times, the area is served by Via Rail passenger train service, as well as McCreary Airport, a small public airport with one 2,600 ft (790 m) turf runway and a hangar. The airport has seen use from government agencies, skiers and pleasure pilots.

McCreary is located along Manitoba Highway 5, which connects it to the Parkland region's largest centre, Dauphin, 78 km (48 mi) to the northwest, as well as Neepawa, 60 km (37 mi) to the south. It also marks the beginning of Manitoba Highway 50, which allows access from the former village to several communities along the western shore of Lake Manitoba.

== Education ==
McCreary is part of the Turtle River School Division, and has one public school, McCreary School. The school has 126 students in grades K-12, and offers academic and vocational classes.
