= Sainte Rose du Lac =

- Seal
- Nickname: Cattle Capital of Manitoba
- Location of Dauphin in Manitoba
- Coordinates: 51°03′34″N 99°31′24″W
- Country: Canada
- Province: Manitoba
- Municipality: Ste. Rose
- Established: 1889
- Incorporated (village): May 25, 1920
- Incorporated (town): March 20, 1998
- Amalgamated: January 1, 2015

Government
  - MP (Dauphin—Swan River—Neepawa): Dan Mazier
  - MLA (Dauphin): Ron Kostyshyn

Area
  - Total: 2.53 km^{2} (0.98 sq mi)

Population (2011)
  - Total: 1,023
  - Density: 404.2/km^{2} (1,047/sq mi)
  - Change 2006-11: ▲2.8
- Time zone: UTC−6 (CST)
  - Summer (DST): UTC−5 (CDT)

Sainte Rose du Lac (often abbreviated Ste Rose du Lac) is an unincorporated urban community in the Municipality of Ste. Rose, Manitoba, Canada.

Prior to 1 January 2015, it was designated as a town. It is located approximately 50 km east-southeast of Dauphin, and approximately 300 km west-northwest of Winnipeg. Ste Rose du Lac had a population of 1,023 as of the 2011 Census.

It is served by Laurier railway station and Sainte Rose du Lac Airport.

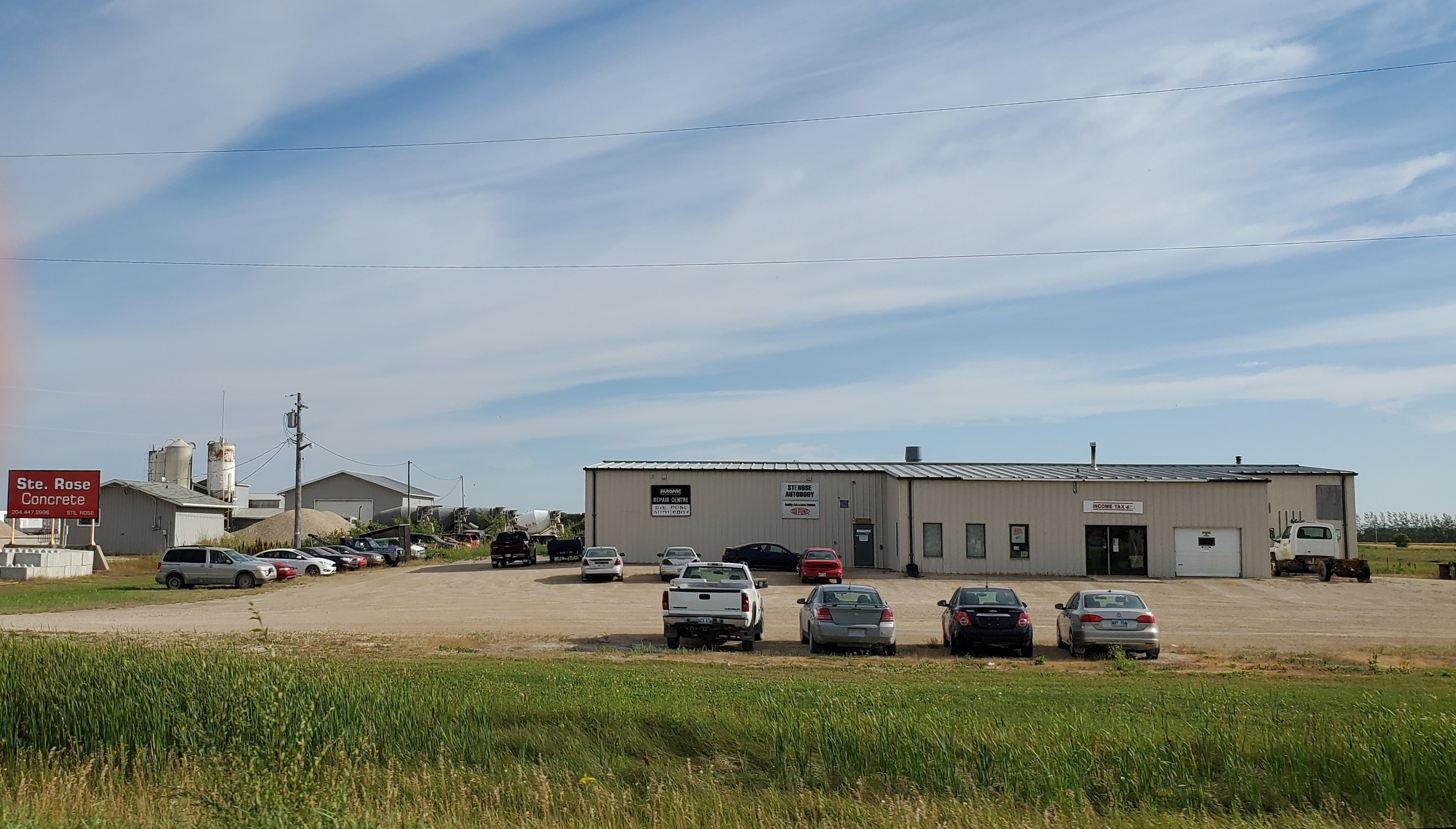
Sainte Rose du Lac

== Demographics ==
In the 2021 Census of Population conducted by Statistics Canada, Ste. Rose du Lac had a population of 997 living in 440 of its 479 total private dwellings, a change of −2.4% from its 2016 population of 1,021. With a land area of 2.48 km^{2} (0.96 sq mi), it had a population density of 402.0/km^{2} (1,041.2/sq mi) in 2021.

Population trend
Census	Population	Change (%)
2021	997	▼2.4%
2016	1,021	▼0.2%
2011	1,023	▲2.8%
2006	995	▼5.0%
2001	1,047	N/A
1996	1,047	▲3.9%

Religious make-up (2021)
Religion	Population	Pct (%)
Christian	525	58.98%
No religious affiliation	335	37.6%
Other	25	2.80%

Income (2006)
Income type	By CAD
Per capita income	$17,587
Median Household Income	$26,833
Median Family Income	$47,566

Mother tongue language (2006)
Language	Population	Pct (%)
English	670	72.82%
French	180	19.56%
Other languages	65	7.06%

== Media ==
A retransmitter of CKSB (St. Boniface), CKSB-1, first went on the air as CBKB on the AM frequency of 860 kHz on February 1, 1968.

Radio-Canada applied in 2012 to move its broadcast tower that transmits CKSB-FM-1 (Ici Radio-Canada Premiere) to Ste. Rose du Lac, from Starbuck. CKSB-FM-1 now broadcasts on 88.1 MHz.
