= List of census divisions of Canada by population =

The following table lists Canada's census divisions by population in the 2016 Canadian census, from highest to lowest. Clicking on the province's two letter abbreviation will take you to a list of census divisions for that province with links.

== List ==
Rank (2016)	Rank (2011)	Rank (2006)	Name	Division type	Province	Population (2016)	Population (2011)	Population (2006)	Unadjusted (2006)	Illustrative census subdivision (Note: The "illustrative census subdivision" field helps to illustrate the geographic placement of the census division, especially when it has a cryptic numerical name ("Division 3"). This will often, but not necessarily, be the most populous subdivision (city, town, etc). Subdivisions of a census division are listed in the "Hierarchy" tab of each census profile, for instance:)
1	1	1	Toronto	Independent city	ON	2,731,571	2,615,060	2,503,281		
2	2	2	Metro Vancouver	Regional district	BC	2,463,431	2,313,328	2,116,581		Burnaby
3	3	3	Montreal	Equivalent to RCM (Note: For statistical purposes, larger cities in Quebec are considered as "territory equivalent to a regional county municipality".)	QC	1,942,044	1,886,481	1,854,442		Montreal
4	4	4	Division No. 6	Division	AB	1,498,778	1,311,022	1,160,936		Calgary
5	5	5	Peel (Note: There was an adjustment involving Peel Regional Municipality, Ontario and Halton Regional Municipality, Ontario with a population gain/loss of 50.)	Regional municipality	ON	1,381,739	1,296,814	1,159,455	(was 1,159,405)	Brampton
6	6	6	Division No. 11	Division	AB	1,366,050	1,203,115	1,076,103		Edmonton
7	7	7	York	Regional municipality	ON	1,109,909	1,032,524	892,712		Newmarket
8	8	8	Ottawa	Independent city	ON	934,243	883,391	812,129		
9	9	9	Division No. 11	Division	MB	708,823	666,832	636,177		Winnipeg
10	10	10	Durham	Regional municipality	ON	645,862	608,124	561,258		Whitby
11	11	11	Quebec (Note: The census division whose exact name is simply "Québec" corresponds almost exactly to the urban agglomeration of Quebec City, except it also contains the tiny (in area) parish municipality of Notre-Dame-des-Anges (population 394) and the Indian reserve of Wendake, Quebec (whose last available population was 1,555 in the 2001 census))	Equivalent to RCM	QC	569,717	551,902	525,376		
12	14	14	Halton	Regional municipality	ON	548,435	501,669	439,206	(was 439,256)	Milton
13	12	12	Hamilton	Independent city	ON	536,917	519,949	504,559		
14	13	13	Waterloo	Regional municipality	ON	535,154	507,096	478,121		Kitchener
15	15	17	Simcoe	County	ON	479,650	446,063	422,204		Barrie
16	16	16	Middlesex	County	ON	455,526	439,151	422,333		London
17	17	15	Niagara	Regional municipality	ON	447,888	431,346	427,421		Thorold
18	18	21	Laval	Equivalent to RCM	QC	422,993	401,553	368,709		
19	19	19	Longueuil	Equivalent to RCM	QC	415,347	399,097	385,533		
20	20	20	Halifax	Regional municipality	NS	403,390	390,328	372,858		Halifax
21	21	18	Essex	County	ON	398,953	388,782	393,402		Windsor
22	22	22	Capital	Regional district	BC	383,360	359,991	345,164		Victoria
23	24	25	Division No. 11	Division	SK	303,423	271,170	244,273		Saskatoon
24	23	23	Fraser Valley	Regional district	BC	295,934	277,593	257,031		Abbotsford
25	25	26	Gatineau	Equivalent to RCM	QC	276,245	265,349	242,124		
26	26	24	Division No. 1	Division	NL	270,348	262,410	248,418		St. John's
27	27	27	Division No. 6	Division	SK	262,837	237,746	220,688		Regina
28	28	28	Wellington County	County	ON	222,726	208,360	200,425		Guelph
29	29	29	Division No. 8	Division	AB	209,395	189,243	175,337		Red Deer
30	30	31	Central Okanagan	Regional district	BC	194,882	179,839	162,276		Kelowna
31	32	33	Roussillon	RCM	QC	171,443	162,187	149,996		Delson
32	34	39	Division No. 2	Division	AB	169,729	156,536	142,249		Lethbridge
33	31	30	Le Saguenay-et-son-Fjord	City + RCM	QC	167,549	165,211	163,717		Saguenay
34	33	32	Greater Sudbury	Independent city	ON	161,647	160,376	157,909		
35	35	35	Sherbrooke	Equivalent to RCM	QC	161,323	154,601	147,427		
36	39	45	Les Moulins	RCM	QC	158,267	148,813	128,467		Terrebonne
37	36	37	Thérèse-De Blainville (Note: There was an adjustment involving Deux-Montagnes Regional County Municipality, Quebec and Thérèse-De Blainville Regional County Municipality, Quebec with a population gain/loss of 15.)	RCM	QC	157,103	154,144	143,355	(was 143,370)	Boisbrand
38	40	40	Nanaimo	Regional district	BC	155,698	146,574	138,631		Nanaimo
39	38	38	Francheville	City + RCM	QC	153,030	149,203	143,267		Trois-Rivières, Saint-Luc-de-Vincennes
40	37	36	Frontenac	County	ON	150,475	149,738	143,865		Kingston
41	42	42	Westmorland	County	NB	149,623	144,158	132,849		Dorchester
42	43	49	Vaudreuil-Soulanges	RCM	QC	149,349	139,353	120,395		Vaudreuil-Dorion
43	41	34	Thunder Bay	District	ON	146,048	146,057	149,063		Thunder Bay
44	44	44	Lévis	Equivalent to RCM	QC	143,414	138,769	130,006		
45	47	41	Peterborough	County	ON	138,236	134,933	133,080		Peterborough
46	46	43	Hastings	County	ON	136,445	134,934	130,474		Belleville
47	45	47	Brant	Two single-tier municipalities	ON	134,808	136,035	125,099		Brantford
48	48	48	Thompson-Nicola	Regional district	BC	132,663	128,473	122,286		Kamloops
49	53	60	La Rivière-du-Nord	RCM	QC	128,170	115,165	101,571		Saint-Jérôme
50	49	46	Lambton	County	ON	126,638	126,199	128,204		Plympton-Wyoming
51	50	52	L'Assomption (Note: There was an adjustment involving Joliette Regional County Municipality, Quebec and L'Assomption Regional County Municipality, Quebec with a population gain/loss of 15.)	RCM	QC	124,759	119,840	109,621	(was 109,636)	L'Assomption
52	51	56	La Vallée-du-Richelieu	RCM	QC	124,420	116,773	106,762		Beloeil
53	56	62	Division No. 19	Division	AB	120,380	109,712	98,712		Grande Prairie
54	54	53	Le Haut-Richelieu	RCM	QC	117,443	114,344	108,892		Saint-Jean-sur-Richelieu
55	52	50	Algoma District	District	ON	114,094	115,870	117,461		Sault Ste. Marie
56	55	51	Stormont, Dundas and Glengarry	County	ON	113,429	111,164	110,399		Cornwall
57	58	58	Oxford	County	ON	110,862	105,719	102,756		Woodstock
58	57	55	Haldimand-Norfolk	Two single-tier municipalities	ON	109,787	109,118	107,812		
59	63	64	Drummond	RCM	QC	103,397	98,681	92,982		Drummondville
60	61	63	Renfrew	County	ON	102,394	101,326	97,545		Pembroke
61	59	54	Chatham-Kent	Single-tier municipality	ON	102,042	104,075	108,589		
62	62	61	Leeds and Grenville	County	ON	100,546	99,306	99,206		Brockville
63	60	57	Cape Breton	Regional municipality	NS	98,722	101,619	105,928		Sydney
64	64	67	York (Note: There was an adjustment involving Northumberland County, New Brunswick and York County, New Brunswick with a population gain/loss of 846.)	County	NB	99,411	97,238	90,026	(was 90,872)	Fredericton
65	65	68	Deux-Montagnes	RCM	QC	98,203	95,670	87,264	(was 87,249)	Deux-Montagnes
66	66	69	Division No. 10	Division	AB	97,449	93,039	86,796		Camrose
67	68	66	Fraser-Fort George	Regional district	BC	94,506	91,879	92,264		Prince George
68	67	65	Grey	County	ON	93,830	92,568	92,411		Owen Sound
69	70	76	Prescott and Russell	County	ON	89,333	85,381	80,184		L'Orignal
70	69	71	Elgin	County	ON	88,978	87,461	85,351		St. Thomas
71	71	70	La Haute-Yamaska (Note: On January 1, 2010, the city of Bromont, Quebec was moved from La Haute-Yamaska Regional County Municipality to Brome-Missisquoi Regional County Municipality, with a population gain/loss of 6,049.)	RCM	QC	88,306	85,042	79,356	(was 85,405)	Granby
72	73	75	Les Maskoutains	RCM	QC	87,099	84,248	80,694		Saint-Hyacinthe
73	74	78	Division No. 15	Division	SK	85,908	83,725	79,018		Prince Albert
74	75	74	Northumberland	County	ON	85,598	82,126	80,963		Cobourg
75	76	80	North Okanagan	Regional district	BC	84,354	81,237	77,301		Coldstream
76	79	81	Cowichan Valley	Regional district	BC	83,739	80,332	76,929		Duncan
77	72	72	Nipissing	District	ON	83,150	84,736	84,688		North Bay
78	78	77	Okanagan-Similkameen	Regional district	BC	83,022	80,742	79,475		Penticton
79	80	84	Division No. 1	Division	AB	82,627	78,694	74,550		Medicine Hat
80	81	86	Queens	County	PE	82,017	77,866	72,744		Charlottetown
81	77	73	Cochrane	District	ON	79,682	81,122	82,503		Timmins
82	82	79	Gloucester	County	NB	78,444	77,792	78,948		Bathurst
83	85	87	Marguerite-D'Youville (formerly Lajemmerais (Note: Lajemmerais Regional County Municipality changed its name to Marguerite-D'Youville Regional County Municipality as of February 12, 2011; however, Statistics Canada retained the name "Lajemmerais" for the 2011 census because its geographical reference date was January 1, 2011. The new name will be used in the 2016 census.))	RCM	QC	77,550	74,416	69,881		Verchères
84	84	85	Perth	County	ON	76,796	75,112	74,344		Stratford
85	93	104	Division No. 2	Division	MB	75,571	65,374	55,886		Steinbach
86	86	83	Kawartha Lakes	Single-tier	ON	75,423	73,214	74,561		Lindsay
87	83	82	Saint John	County	NB	74,020	76,550	74,621		Saint John
88	90	109	Division No. 16	Division	AB	73,988	67,516	53,080		Fort McMurray
89	88	89	Arthabaska	RCM	QC	72,014	69,237	66,247		Victoriaville
90	89	88	Division No. 13	Division	AB	71,016	68,919	66,972		Athabasca
91	87	90	Kings	County	NB	68,941	69,665	65,824		Hampton
92	94	100	Division No. 7	Division	MB	68,746	64,317	59,168		Brandon
93	92	93	Lanark	County	ON	68,698	65,667	63,785		Perth
94	91	91	Bruce	County	ON	68,147	66,102	65,349		Walkerton
95	97	97	Division No. 12	Division	AB	67,120	63,427	59,990		St. Paul
96	95	101	Joliette	RCM	QC	66,550	63,551	58,369	(was 58,354)	Joliette
97	96	–	Comox Valley (Note: On February 15, 2008, the Comox-Strathcona Regional District of British Columbia was abolished and replaced by the Comox Valley Regional District and the Strathcona Regional District.)	Regional district	BC	66,527	63,538	59,482	(was: none)	Courtenay
98	106	92	Kenora	District	ON	65,533	57,607	64,419		Kenora
99	99	95	Beauharnois-Salaberry	RCM	QC	64,320	61,950	60,802		Beauharnois
100	102	102	Peace River	Regional district	BC	62,942	60,082	58,264		Dawson Creek
101	98	94	Cariboo	Regional district	BC	61,988	62,392	62,190		Williams Lake
102	107	107	Dufferin	County	ON	61,735	56,881	54,436		Orangeville
103	100	99	Division No. 17	Division	AB	61,590	61,504	59,282		Slave Lake
104	101	96	Kings	County	NS	60,600	60,589	60,035		Kentville
105	105	103	Muskoka	Regional municipality	ON	60,599	58,047	57,563		Bracebridge
106	108	106	East Kootenay	Regional district	BC	60,439	56,685	55,485		Cranbrook
107	104	105	Central Kootenay	Regional district	BC	59,517	58,441	55,883		Nelson
108	103	98	Huron	County	ON	59,297	59,100	59,325		Goderich
109	109	120	Brome-Missisquoi	RCM	QC	58,314	55,621	52,769	(was 46,720)	Cowansville
110	110	108	Rimouski-Neigette	RCM	QC	56,650	55,095	53,193		Rimouski
111	111	112	Division No. 5	Division	AB	55,708	53,263	51,104		Drumheller
112	113	125	Division No. 3	Division	MB	54,796	51,350	44,873		Winkler
113	120	122	Portneuf	RCM	QC	53,008	49,370	46,507		Cap-Santé
114	112	111	Lac-Saint-Jean-Est	RCM	QC	52,741	52,520	51,170		Alma
115	122	130	Montcalm	RCM	QC	52,596	48,378	42,558		Sainte-Julienne
116	115	117	Beauce-Sartigan	RCM	QC	52,406	50,962	49,611		Saint-Georges
117	117	113	Columbia-Shuswap	Regional district	BC	51,366	50,512	50,141		Salmon Arm
118	116	115	Pierre-De Saurel formerly Le Bas-Richelieu	RCM	QC	51,025	50,900	49,932		Sorel-Tracy
119	114	114	Colchester	County	NS	50,585	50,968	50,023		Truro
120	138	157	Mirabel	Equivalent to RCM	QC	50,513	41,957	34,626		Mirabel
121	119	116	Matawinie	RCM	QC	50,435	49,516	49,717		Rawdon
122	121	124	Memphrémagog	RCM	QC	50,415	48,551	45,310		Magog
123	118	110	Shawinigan	Equivalent to RCM	QC	49,349	50,060	51,904		
124	127	131	Les Collines-de-l'Outaouais	RCM	QC	49,094	46,393	42,005		Chelsea
125	125	126	Division No. 13	Division	MB	49,086	46,888	44,829		Selkirk
126	131	137	Division No. 17	Division	SK	47,900	44,180	40,406		Lloydminster
127	126	123	Division No. 7	Division	SK	47,195	46,648	45,532		Moose Jaw
128	124	119	Lunenburg	County	NS	47,126	47,313	47,150		Lunenburg
129	129	129	Les Laurentides	RCM	QC	45,902	45,157	42,896		Mont-Blanc
130	123	118	Northumberland	County	NB	44,952	48,355	49,714	(was 48,868)	Miramichi
131	132	–	Strathcona	Regional district	BC	44,671	43,252	42,113	(was: none)	Campbell River
132	135	141	Nord-du-Québec (Jamésie-Nunavik)	Administrative region	QC	44,561	42,579	39,817		Chibougamau
133	128	121	Pictou	County	NS	43,748	45,643	46,513		Pictou
134	130	127	Prince	County	PE	43,730	44,348	44,499		Summerside
135	155	177	La Jacques-Cartier	RCM	QC	43,485	36,883	29,738		Shannon
136	134	132	La Vallée-de-l'Or	RCM	QC	43,226	42,896	41,896		Val-d'Or
137	139	136	Lennox and Addington	County	ON	42,888	41,824	40,542		Napanee
138	137	134	Parry Sound	District	ON	42,824	42,162	40,918		Parry Sound
139	149	154	Squamish-Lillooet	Regional district	BC	42,665	38,171	35,225		Pemberton
140	136	133	Hants	County	NS	42,558	42,304	41,182		Windsor
141	133	128	Les Appalaches	RCM	QC	42,346	43,120	43,390		Thetford Mines
142	141	139	Rouyn-Noranda	Equivalent to RCM	QC	42,334	41,012	39,924		
143	140	138	D'Autray	RCM	QC	42,189	41,650	40,321		Berthierville
144	143	144	Division No. 22	Division	MB	42,165	40,923	38,421		Thompson
145	142	135	Division No. 5	Division	NL	42,014	41,004	40,805		Corner Brook
146	144	149	Les Pays-d'en-Haut	RCM	QC	41,877	40,331	36,573		Sainte-Adèle
147	145	140	Division No. 7	Division	AB	41,574	40,232	39,909		Stettler
148	146	143	Sept-Rivières—Caniapiscau	Two regional county municipalities	QC	39,322	39,500	38,661		Sept-Îles, Fermont
149	148	147	Division No. 3	Division	AB	38,956	38,566	37,846		Fort Macleod
150	158	158	Division No. 15	Division	AB	38,594	35,983	34,150		Banff
151	152	151	Division No. 6	Division	NL	38,345	37,304	36,208		Grand Falls-Windsor
152	150	148	Division No. 16	Division	SK	37,999	37,845	37,118		North Battleford
153	147	145	Bulkley-Nechako	Regional district	BC	37,896	39,208	38,243		Burns Lake
154	151	146	Kitimat-Stikine (Note: There was an adjustment involving Kitimat-Stikine and Stikine Regional District, British Columbia with a population gain/loss of 477.)	Regional district	BC	37,367	37,361	38,476	(was 37,999)>	Terrace
155	160	162	Bellechasse	RCM	QC	37,233	35,318	33,330		Saint-Lazare-de-Bellechasse
156	156	160	Division No. 18	Division	SK	37,064	36,557	33,919		La Ronge
157	163	170	La Nouvelle-Beauce	RCM	QC	36,785	35,107	31,415		Sainte-Marie
158	159	171	Rouville	RCM	QC	36,536	35,690	31,365		Marieville
159	157	152	Maskinongé	RCM	QC	36,316	36,286	35,637		Louiseville
160	153	150	Division No. 14	Division	SK	36,096	37,195	36,515		Melfort
161	166	175	Yukon	Territory	YT	35,874	33,897	30,372		Whitehorse
162	154	142	Division No. 8	Division	NL	35,794	37,121	38,937		Lewisporte
163	161	156	Division No. 9	Division	SK	35,634	35,314	34,736		Yorkton
164	162	155	Antoine-Labelle	RCM	QC	35,243	35,159	34,999		Mont-Laurier
165	164	153	Division No. 7	Division	NL	34,092	34,686	35,501		Bonavista
166	165	163	Rivière-du-Loup	RCM	QC	33,958	34,375	33,305		Rivière-du-Loup
167	167	159	Madawaska	County	NB	32,741	33,422	34,071		Edmundston
168	170	176	Argenteuil	RCM	QC	32,389	32,117	29,992		Lachute
169	168	164	Timiskaming District	District	ON	32,251	32,634	33,283		Temiskaming Shores
170	175	179	Division No. 1	Division	SK	31,766	31,333	29,168		Estevan
171	172	174	Division No. 5	Division	SK	31,750	32,007	30,529		Melville
172	181	184	Lotbinière	RCM	QC	31,741	29,617	27,425		Sainte-Croix
173	176	172	Kootenay Boundary	Regional district	BC	31,447	31,138	30,742		Trail
174	173	168	Le Domaine-du-Roy	RCM	QC	31,285	31,870	31,956		Roberval
175	171	165	Manicouagan	RCM	QC	31,027	32,012	33,052		Baie-Comeau
176	177	173	Alberni-Clayoquot	Regional district	BC	30,981	31,061	30,664		Port Alberni
177	169	161	Restigouche	County	NB	30,955	32,594	33,834		Dalhousie
178	179	178	Division No. 8	Division	SK	30,718	29,962	29,199		Swift Current
179	180	180	Le Val-Saint-François	RCM	QC	30,686	29,654	29,023		Richmond
180	178	169	Kent	County	NB	30,475	30,833	31,449		Richibucto
181	174	167	Cumberland	County	NS	30,005	31,353	32,046		Amherst
182	183	182	Sunshine Coast	Regional district	BC	29,970	28,619	27,759		Sechelt
183	184	181	Division No. 14	Division	AB	29,291	28,584	27,881		Edson
184	182	183	Albert	County	NB	29,158	28,846	27,562		Riverview
185	189	198	La Côte-de-Beaupré	RCM	QC	28,199	26,172	23,015		Château-Richer
186	188	192	Les Jardins-de-Napierville	RCM	QC	27,870	26,234	24,111		Napierville
187	185	189	Sunbury	County	NB	27,644	27,143	25,542		Burton
188	186	186	Carleton	County	NB	26,220	27,019	26,632		Woodstock
189	187	185	Charlotte	County	NB	25,428	26,549	26,898		St. Andrews
190	190	188	Maria-Chapdelaine	RCM	QC	24,793	25,279	25,767		Dolbeau-Mistassini
191	192	190	Prince Edward County	Single-tier	ON	24,735	25,258	25,496		Picton
192	193	191	Abitibi	RCM	QC	24,639	24,354	24,275		Amos
192	194	193	Division No. 10	Division	NL	24,639	24,111	23,950		Happy Valley – Goose Bay
194	191	187	Yarmouth	County	NS	24,419	25,275	26,277		Yarmouth
195	195	197	Division No. 9	Division	MB	24,391	23,489	23,086		Portage la Prairie
196	196	194	Division No. 18	Division	MB	24,036	23,469	23,861		Gimli
197	198	200	Division No. 12	Division	SK	23,986	23,228	22,452		Battleford
198	207	222	Division No. 12	Division	MB	23,683	21,830	19,753		Beausejour
199	197	196	L'Érable	RCM	QC	23,425	23,366	23,158		Plessisville
200	199	202	Division No. 13	Division	SK	23,224	23,089	22,342		Kindersley
201	201	199	Nicolet-Yamaska	RCM	QC	23,159	22,798	23,007		Nicolet
202	202	208	Papineau	RCM	QC	22,832	22,541	21,863		Papineauville
203	203	219	Division No. 2	Division	SK	22,825	22,266	20,363		Weyburn
204	200	195	Montmagny	RCM	QC	22,698	22,877	23,201		Montmagny
205	214	207	Le Haut-Saint-Laurent	RCM	QC	22,454	21,197	21,943		Huntingdon
206	206	210	Le Haut-Saint-François	RCM	QC	22,335	22,065	21,744		Cookshire-Eaton
207	205	201	Division No. 17	Division	MB	22,205	22,208	22,358		Dauphin
208	211	211	Division No. 21	Division	MB	21,983	21,393	21,606		Flin Flon
209	215	215	Sudbury District (Note: There was an adjustment involving Sudbury District and Manitoulin District, Ontario with a population gain/loss of 459.)	District	ON	21,546	21,196	21,851	(was 21,392)	Espanola
210	204	203	Le Granit	RCM	QC	21,462	22,259	22,342		Lac-Mégantic
211	209	214	Division No. 15	Division	MB	21,379	21,604	21,417		Neepawa
212	208	205	Matane	RCM	QC	21,301	21,786	22,247		Matane
213	210	206	Kamouraska	RCM	QC	21,073	21,492	22,084		Saint-Pascal
214	213	220	Division No. 9	Division	AB	20,869	21,290	20,351		Rocky Mountain House
215	218	213	Annapolis	County	NS	20,591	20,756	21,438		Annapolis Royal
216	216	217	Abitibi-Ouest	RCM	QC	20,538	21,003	20,792		La Sarre
217	222	231	Bécancour	RCM	QC	20,404	20,081	18,806		Bécancour
218	217	216	Division No. 4	Division	NL	20,387	20,840	21,168		Stephenville
219	212	204	Division No. 2	Division	NL	20,372	21,351	22,298		Marystown
220	220	218	La Vallée-de-la-Gatineau	RCM	QC	20,182	20,530	20,518		Gracefield
221	221	212	Rainy River	District	ON	20,110	20,370	21,564		Fort Frances
222	226	–	Region 6 (Note: The Northwest Territories census divisions of Fort Smith and Inuvik Region were replaced by Region 1, Region 2, Region 3, Region 4, Region 5, Region 6.)	Region	NT	20,090	19,444	19,210	(was: none)	Yellowknife
223	224	224	Powell River	Regional district	BC	20,070	19,906	19,599		Powell River
224	219	209	Témiscouata	RCM	QC	19,574	20,572	21,785		Notre-Dame-du-Lac
225	225	230	Antigonish	County	NS	19,301	19,589	18,836		Antigonish
226	227	232	Robert-Cliche	RCM	QC	19,125	19,288	18,790		Beauceville
227	245	248	Baffin	Region	NU	18,988	16,939	15,765		Iqaluit
228	233	236	Division No. 14	Division	MB	18,621	18,497	18,118		Stonewall
229	223	221	Victoria	County	NB	18,617	19,921	20,319		Perth-Andover
230	241	243	Division No. 1	Division	MB	18,534	17,331	17,476		Lac du Bonnet
231	229	234	Coaticook	RCM	QC	18,497	18,847	18,467		Coaticook
232	228	225	La Mitis	RCM	QC	18,210	18,942	19,365		Mont-Joli
233	230	223	Skeena-Queen Charlotte	Regional district	BC	18,133	18,784	19,664		Prince Rupert
234	244	247	Haliburton	County	ON	18,062	17,026	16,147		Minden
235	231	226	La Matapédia	RCM	QC	17,925	18,573	19,199		Amqui
236	232	229	L'Islet	RCM	QC	17,798	18,517	18,902		Saint-Jean-Port-Joli
237	235	238	Bonaventure	RCM	QC	17,660	18,000	17,948		New Carlisle
238	234	228	Digby	County	NS	17,323	18,036	18,992		Digby
239	238	235	Le Rocher-Percé	RCM	QC	17,282	17,979	18,437		Chandler
240	239	227	Inverness	County	NS	17,235	17,947	19,036		Port Hood
241	236	233	Kings	County	PE	17,160	17,990	18,608		Georgetown
242	237	239	La Côte-de-Gaspé	RCM	QC	17,117	17,985	17,888		Rivière-au-Renard
243	240	241	Division No. 10	Division	SK	16,563	17,546	17,680		Wynyard
244	242	242	Les Etchemins	RCM	QC	16,536	17,254	17,599		Lac-Etchemin
245	243	246	Division No. 19	Division	MB	16,518	17,240	16,321		Bissett
246	247	244	Témiscamingue	RCM	QC	15,980	16,425	16,985		Ville-Marie
247	246	237	Division No. 9	Division	NL	15,607	16,786	18,084		St. Anthony
248	250	251	Acton	RCM	QC	15,594	15,381	15,289		Acton Vale
249	248	240	Division No. 3	Division	NL	15,560	16,306	17,686		Channel-Port aux Basques
250	249	245	Charlevoix-Est	RCM	QC	15,509	16,240	16,372		Clermont
251	252	250	La Tuque	Equivalent to RCM	QC	15,059	15,130	15,448		
252	254	255	Division No. 18	Division	AB	14,488	14,534	14,322		Grande Cache
253	251	252	Avignon	RCM	QC	14,461	15,246	14,643		Nouvelle
254	253	254	Les Sources	RCM	QC	14,286	14,756	14,466		Val-des-Sources
255	256	253	Pontiac	RCM	QC	14,251	14,358	14,586		Campbell's Bay
256	257	256	Division No. 8	Division	MB	13,968	14,127	14,052		Gladstone
257	255	249	Shelburne	County	NS	13,966	14,496	15,544		Shelburne
258	259	261	Manitoulin	District	ON	13,255	13,048	12,631	(was 13,090)	Gore Bay
259	261	257	Division No. 5	Division	MB	13,176	12,922	13,301		Killarney
260	258	258	Charlevoix	RCM	QC	12,997	13,338	13,190		Baie-Saint-Paul
261	263	259	Division No. 3	Division	SK	12,610	12,691	13,133		Assiniboia
262	262	260	Les Îles-de-la-Madeleine	Equivalent to RCM	QC	12,475	12,781	13,091		Cap-aux-Meules
263	260	262	Mékinac	RCM	QC	12,358	12,924	12,672		Saint-Tite
264	271	273	Division No. 10	Division	MB	11,941	10,673	9,902		Sanford
265	265	265	Minganie—Le Golfe-du-Saint-Laurent	Two regional county municipalities	QC	11,323	11,708	11,895		Havre-Saint-Pierre
266	264	263	La Haute-Gaspésie	RCM	QC	11,316	12,088	12,329		Sainte-Anne-des-Monts
267	267	267	Mount Waddington	Regional district	BC	11,035	11,506	11,651		Port McNeill
268	270	269	Division No. 4	Division	SK	10,854	10,879	11,086		Maple Creek
269	266	264	La Haute-Côte-Nord	RCM	QC	10,846	11,546	12,303		Les Escoumins
270	268	266	Queens	County	NB	10,472	11,086	11,708		Gagetown
271	279	280	Keewatin	Region	NU	10,413	8,955	8,348		Arviat
272	269	268	Queens	County	NS	10,351	10,960	11,212		Liverpool
274	276	277	Division No. 4	Division	MB	9,986	9,306	9,380		Pilot Mound
273	273	274	Division No. 6	Division	MB	10,317	10,025	9,814		Virden
275	275	272	Division No. 16	Division	MB	9,848	9,928	9,945		Roblin
276	274	271	Division No. 20	Division	MB	9,621	9,952	10,405		Swan River
277	272	270	Division No. 4	Division	AB	9,573	10,078	10,600		Hanna
278	280	281	Division No. 23	Division	MB	8,971	8,590	8,252		Churchill
279	277	275	Richmond	County	NS	8,964	9,293	9,740		Arichat
280	278	276	Les Basques	RCM	QC	8,694	9,142	9,475		Trois-Pistoles
281	281	279	Guysborough County	County	NS	7,625	8,143	9,058		Guysborough
282	282	282	Victoria County	County	NS	7,089	7,115	7,594		Baddeck
283	285	283	L'Île-d'Orléans	RCM	QC	7,082	6,711	6,862		Sainte-Famille
284	283	–	Region 5	Region	NT	6,980	6,907	6,958	(was: none)	Hay River
285	286	285	Kitikmeot	Region	NU	6,543	6,012	5,361		Cambridge Bay
286	284	–	Region 1	Region	NT	6,372	6,712	6,718	(was: none)	Inuvik
287	287	284	Northern Rockies Regional Municipality	Regional municipality	BC	5,393	5,578	6,147		Fort Nelson
288	289	286	Central Coast	Regional district	BC	3,319	3,206	3,189		Bella Coola
289	288	–	Region 4	Region	NT	3,160	3,246	3,330	(was: none)	Fort Simpson
290	290	–	Region 3	Region	NT	2,751	2,812	2,774	(was: none)	Behchoko
291	291	287	Division No. 11	Division	NL	2,558	2,617	2,414		Nain
292	292	–	Region 2	Region	NT	2,433	2,341	2,474	(was: none)	Norman Wells
293	293	288	Stikine	Region	BC	740	629	632	(was 1,109)	Lower Post
–	–	59	Comox-Strathcona	Regional district	BC		Abolished	101,595		Courtenay
–	–	166	Fort Smith	Region	NT		Abolished	32,272		Yellowknife
–	–	278	Inuvik Region	Region	NT		Abolished	9,192		Inuvik

== See also ==
- List of the largest cities and towns in Canada by area
- List of the largest municipalities in Canada by population
- List of the largest population centres in Canada
- List of metropolitan areas in Canada
- Population of Canada by province and territory
- List of largest Canadian cities by census
- Population of Canada by year
