= List of regions of Manitoba =

This is a list of regions in Manitoba, Canada, including Manitoba's geographic regions, economic regions, and health regions. These regions do not reflect the organization of local government in Manitoba. These areas exist solely for the purposes of statistical analysis and presentation; they have no government of their own.

Typically outlined by provincial or federal authorities, these formal and informal regional models broadly follow the geographic definitions, but have particular variations depending on their administrative or other purpose.

== Geographic regions ==
These are informal geographic regions, accompanied by the census divisions in each. Unlike in some other provinces, census divisions in Manitoba do not reflect the organization of local government: these areas exist solely for the purposes of statistical analysis and presentation; they have no government of their own.

=== Provincial regions ===
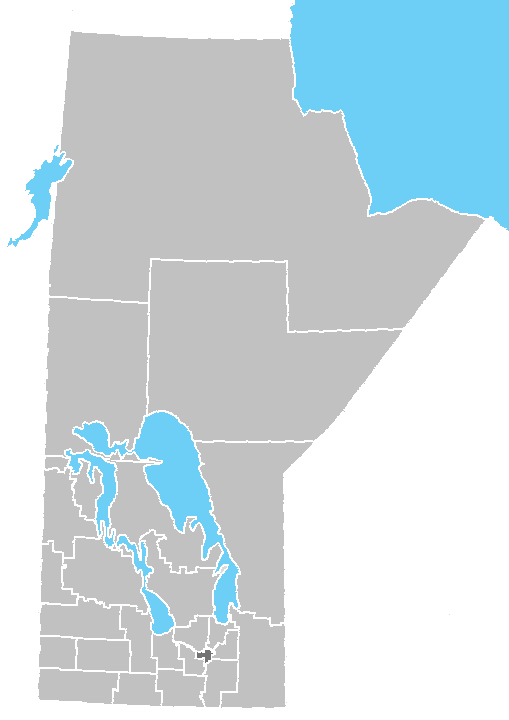

==== Central Manitoba ====
- Interlake
  - North Interlake (Division No. 18)
  - Selkirk Area (Division No. 13)
  - South Interlake (Division No. 14)
- Parkland
  - Dauphin (Division No. 17)
  - Roblin, Russell, Rossburn Area (Division No. 16)
  - Swan Valley (Division No. 20)

Northern Manitoba

- Northern (Norman or Nor-Man) — this region was added to the province in 1912, and includes all land north of the 52nd parallel.
  - Churchill/Northern Manitoba (Division No. 23)
  - Flin Flon/North West (Division No. 21)
  - North East Manitoba, or North Eastman (Division No. 19)
  - Thompson/North Central (Division No. 22)

==== Southern Manitoba ====
Southern Manitoba includes:

- Central Plains — north-central Manitoba
  - Central Manitoba (Division No. 8)
  - Portage la Prairie Area (Division No. 9)
  - Whitehorse Plains (Division No. 10)
- Eastman — southeast Manitoba
  - Beausejour Area (Division No. 12)
  - Eastern Manitoba (Division No. 1)
  - Steinbach Area (Division No. 2)
- Pembina Valley — south-central Manitoba
  - Pembina Valley (Division No. 3)
  - Pilot Mound Area (Division No. 4)
- Westman — southwest Manitoba
  - Brandon Area (Division No. 7)
  - South West Area (Division No. 5)
  - Virden Area (Division No. 6)
  - Western Manitoba (Division No. 15)
- Winnipeg Capital Region — Includes the 16 municipalities identified in Manitoba's Capital Region Partnership Act. As such, unlike the other regions, this region also includes municipalities that are components of the other regions that border it.
  - Winnipeg census division (Division No. 11):
    - City of Winnipeg
    - Headingley
  - Three rural municipalities from the Central Plains Region (Division 10 in its entirety):
    - Cartier
    - Macdonald
    - St. François Xavier
  - Three rural municipalities from the Eastman Region (portions of Divisions 2 and 12):
    - Ritchot
    - Springfield
    - Taché
  - Eight rural municipalities from the Interlake Region (all of Division 13 and part of Division 14):
    - East St. Paul
    - Rockwood
    - Rosser
    - Selkirk
    - St. Andrews
    - St. Clements
    - Stonewall
    - West St. Paul

=== Extraterritorial regions ===
In the broader context of Canada's 7 primary regions, as well as those of North America's various regions, Manitoba can be considered by the following physiographic regions:

- Hudson Bay Lowlands
- Canadian Shield
- Interior Plains
- Red River Valley
- Western Canada
  - Canadian Prairies

== Economic regions ==
The economic regions of Manitoba are defined by Statistics Canada. Manitoba is broken into 8 economic regions, each with its own competitive advantages and potential opportunities. These regions also include "self-contained labour areas," or SLAs, which are local geographic areas in Manitoba where people live and work and that have a minimum population of 3,000 and a minimum tax base of CA$130 million. These areas are solely based on economic relationships that exist between neighbouring towns and municipalities.

Manitoba's 8 economic regions include the following.

Rural Manitoba:

- Southeast Economic Region — comprising all of the Eastman region (census divisions 1, 2, and 12), and can be further broken down into the following SLAs:
  - Beausejour Brokenhead Area
  - Emerson Area
  - Hanover Area
  - La Broquerie Area
  - Lac du Bonnet Area
  - Niverville Area
  - Powerview-Pine Falls Area
  - Ritchot Area
  - Springfield Area
  - St. Pierre-Jolys Area
  - Steinbach Area
  - Stuartburn Area
  - Taché Area
- South Central Economic Region — comprising all of the Pembina Valley region (census divisions 3 and 4), and can further be broken down into the following SLAs:
  - Altona Area
  - Carman Area
  - Cartwright Area
  - Manitou Area
  - Morris Area
  - Winkler Area
- Southwest Economic Region — comprising all of the Westman region (census divisions 5, 6, 7, and 15), and can further be broken down into the following SLAs:
  - Boissevain Area
  - Brandon Area
  - Hamiota Area
  - Killarney Area
  - Melita Area
  - Minnedosa Area
  - Neepawa Area
  - Rivers Area
  - Souris Area
  - Virden Area
  - Wawanesa Area
- North Central Economic Region — comprising all of the Central Plains region (census divisions 8, 9, and 10), and can further be broken down into the following SLAs:
  - Gladstone Area
  - Macdonald Area
  - Portage la Prairie Area
  - St. Francois Xavier Area
  - Treherne Area
- Interlake Economic Region — comprising all of the Interlake region (census divisions 13, 14, and 18), and can further be broken down into the following SLAs:
  - Arborg Area
  - East St. Paul Area
  - Gimli Area
  - Selkirk Area
  - St. Andrews Area
  - St. Clements Area
  - St. Laurent Area
  - Stonewall Area
  - West St. Paul Area
  - Woodlands Area
- Parkland Economic Region — comprising all of the Parkland region (census divisions 17, 16, and 20), and can further be broken down into the following SLAs:
  - Dauphin Area
  - Grandview Area
  - Roblin Area
  - Russell Area
  - Ste. Rose Area
  - Swan Valley Area

Northern Manitoba:

- North Economic Region — comprising all of the Norman region (census divisions 19, 21, 22, and 23), and can further be broken down into the following SLAs:
  - Churchill Area
  - Flin Flon Area
  - Gillam Area
  - Grand Rapids Area
  - Leaf Rapids Area
  - Lynn Lake Area
  - Snow Lake Area
  - The Pas Area
  - Thompson Area

Winnipeg:

- Winnipeg Economic Region — comprising census division 11 (City of Winnipeg and Rural Municipality of Headingley); it does not include the Metro Region.

=== EI regions ===
The Government of Canada has its own economic regions created for the provision of employment Insurance (EI) in each province/territory. These "Employment Insurance Economic Regions" are defined by the federal Employment Insurance Act and Regulations.

- EI Region of Winnipeg (EI Region #39) — includes Brokenhead 4, East St. Paul, Headingley, Ritchot, Rosser, Springfield, St. Clements, St. François Xavier, Taché, West St. Paul, and Winnipeg.
- EI Region of Southern Manitoba (EI Region #40) — includes census divisions 2, 13, and 14, as well as the entirety of the Central Plains, Interlake, Parkland, Pembina Valley, and Westman regions.
- EI Region of Northern Manitoba (EI Region #41) — includes census divisions 1, 12, and 18, as well as the entirety of the Northern Region

== Health regions ==
Manitoba is also broken down into health regions, which are defined by their respective health authorities, called Regional Health Authorities (RHAs).

The 5 health regions, and their respective RHAs, that exist today were created as an amalgamation of 11 regions and authorities that were merged in 2012:

- Interlake-Eastern health region — comprising the geographic regions of Interlake and North Eastman
- Northern Health health region — comprising the geographic region of Northern Manitoba (excluding Churchill)
- Prairie Mountain health region — comprising southwestern Manitoba, including the geographic regions of Westman and Parkland
- Southern Health-Santé Sud — comprising the geographic region of Pembina Valley and South Eastman (census districts 1 and 2)
- Winnipeg health region — comprising the City of Winnipeg, the northern community of Churchill, and the Rural Municipalities of East and West St. Paul,

== Other ==
=== Schools ===
School divisions and districts in Manitoba are also divided into regions:

- Central — roughly includes the regions of Central Plains and Pembina Valley
- Northern/Remote — includes Northern Manitoba and parts of census divisions 1, 9, and 20
- Parkland/Westman — roughly includes the regions of Westman and Parkland (excluding parts of census division 20)
- Southeast/Interlake — roughly includes the regions of Interlake and Eastman (excluding parts of census division 1)
- Winnipeg — City of Winnipeg

=== Treaties ===
Manitoba can also be divided by its First Nations treaties, as part of the Numbered Treaties of Canada. Some include portions of other provinces.

- Treaty 1 — comprising Winnipeg (census division 11), and southern Manitoba—roughly the regions of Central Plains, Pembina Valley, and Interlake (excluding northern half of census division 18)
- Treaty 2 — comprising southern Manitoba—roughly the Westman Region, census division 17, parts of division 16, southern part of division 19, and northern part of division 18
- Treaty 3 — roughly comprising census division 1; and the Lake of the Woods area of southeastern Ontario
- Treaty 4 — roughly comprising census division 20, the non-contiguous western portion of division 19, and small, westward portion of division 16; and the Qu’Appelle area of southern Saskatchewan
- Treaty 5 — comprising central-northern Manitoba—roughly Northern Manitoba (excluding a portion of division 19; and the furthest-east portion of census division 23, which does not belong to a Manitoba treaty)

=== Manitoba Metis Federation regions ===
The Manitoba Metis Federation, which is the official self-governing political organization for Métis people in Manitoba, uses a regionally-based governance structure wherein the MMF is organized into regional associations that are made up of local associations.

The Manitoba Metis Federation regions, for which the boundaries are established by the MMF Board of Directors, are:

- Northwest Region
- The Pas Region
- Thompson Region
- Interlake Region
- Southeast Region
- Southwest Region
- Winnipeg Region

== See also ==
- Administrative divisions of Canada
- List of census divisions of Manitoba
- List of communities in Manitoba
- List of former counties of Manitoba
- List of municipalities in Manitoba
- List of rural municipalities in Manitoba
- List of regions of Canada
