= Manitoba Provincial Road 302 =

Provincial road in Manitoba, Canada

Provincial Road 302
- PR 302 highlighted in red

Route information
- Maintained by Department of Infrastructure
- Length: 110.4 km (68.6 mi)
- Existed: 1966–present

Major junctions
- North end: PTH 44 / PR 215 at Beausejour
- PTH 15 near Vivian; PTH 1 (TCH) at Richer; PTH 52 / PR 210 at La Broquerie; PTH 12 at Zhoda
- South end: PR 201 near Vita

Location
- Country: Canada
- Province: Manitoba
- Rural municipalities: Brokenhead; La Broquerie; Springfield; Ste. Anne; Stuartburn; Taché
- Towns: Beausejour

Highway system
- Provincial highways in Manitoba; Winnipeg City Routes
← PR 301	→ PR 303

Provincial Road 302 (PR 302) is a provincial road in the Eastman Region of Manitoba, Canada. The 110-kilometre (68 mi) road travels through parts of six municipalities.

== Route description ==
The north terminus of PR 302 is located at the junction of PTH 44 and PR 215 near Beausejour. From there, the road heads south, crossing the Trans-Canada Highway at Richer, and eventually ends at PR 201 approximately 1.5 kilometres (0.93 mi) east of Vita. Along the way, it has short concurrences with PTH 15 and PR 210, and travels through the communities of Beausejour, Richer, La Broquerie, and Zhoda.

Along its route, the road surface of PR 302 alternates between pavement and gravel. The following sections are paved, two-lane road:

- from PTH 44 (Beausejour) to PTH 15 (designated as Class A1 highway by Manitoba Infrastructure and Transportation)
- from PR 501 to PTH 52 (La Broquerie)
- from PTH 12 (Zhoda) to PR 201.

== History ==
PR 302 was originally designated from Beausejour to PR 303. In 1985–1986, PR 302 extended further south to Vita along a new route from PR 303 to Zhoda and PR 208 from Zhoda to Vita.

== Major intersections ==
Division	Location	km	mi	Destinations	Notes
Stuartburn		0.0	0.0	PR 201 – Vita, Sundown	Southern terminus
Stuartburn		11.2	7.0	Bridge over the Rat River	
La Broquerie	Zhoda	17.2	10.7	PTH 12 (MOM's Way) – Steinbach, Sprague	Southern end of unpaved section
La Broquerie		38.4	23.9	PR 303 west – Friedensfeld	Eastern terminus of PR 303
La Broquerie	La Broquerie	43.3	26.9	PTH 52 west – Steinbach; PR 210 south – Marchand	Eastern terminus of PTH 52; southern end of PR 210 concurrency; northern end of unpaved section
La Broquerie / Ste. Anne boundary	La Broquerie	44.9	27.9	PR 210 north – Ste. Anne	Northern end of PR 210 concurrency
La Broquerie / Ste. Anne boundary	La Broquerie	45.2	28.1	Bridge over the Seine River	
Ste. Anne		50.0	31.1	PR 311 west – Giroux	Eastern terminus of PR 311
Ste. Anne	Richer	62.8	39.0	PTH 1 (TCH) – Winnipeg, Kenora	
Taché		72.6	45.1	PR 501 – Ste-Geneviève, Ross	Southern end of unpaved section
Springfield	Vivian	89.1	55.4	PTH 15 east (Dugald Road) – Elma	Southern end of PTH 15 concurrency; Northern end of unpaved section
Springfield		90.4	56.2	PTH 15 west (Dugald Road) – Winnipeg	Northern end of PTH 15 concurrency
Brokenhead	No major junctions				
Town of Beausejour		110.4	68.6	PTH 44 – Lockport, West Hawk Lake; PR 215 west (Park Avenue) – Downtown	Northern terminus; eastern terminus of PR 215
1.000 mi = 1.609 km; 1.000 km = 0.621 mi: Concurrency terminus
