= Manitoba Provincial Road 303 =

Provincial road in Manitoba, Canada

Provincial Road 303
- PR 303 highlighted in red

Route information
- Maintained by Department of Infrastructure
- Length: 13.0 km (8.1 mi)
- Existed: 1966–present

Major junctions
- West end: PTH 12 near Friedensfeld
- East end: PR 302 south of La Broquerie

Location
- Country: Canada
- Province: Manitoba
- Rural municipalities: Hanover; La Broquerie

Highway system
- Provincial highways in Manitoba; Winnipeg City Routes
← PR 302	→ PR 304

Provincial Road 303 (PR 303) is a short 13.0-kilometre-long (8.1 mi) east-west provincial road in the Eastman Region of the Canadian province of Manitoba.

== Route description ==
PR 303 starts as a paved road at Provincial Trunk Highway (PTH) 12 south of Steinbach and runs east for approximately 1.6 kilometres (1 mi) until it reaches the settlement of Friedensfeld. The route continues east as a gravel road for 11.4 kilometres (7 mi) before ending at PR 302 in the Rural Municipality (RM) of La Broquerie.

== History ==
Until 1992, PR 303 extended 37.5 kilometres (23.3 mi) west from PTH 12 through the communities of Kleefeld and Otterburne to PR 200. The former sections of PR 303 are now municipal roads known as Ridge Road, a paved two-lane highway in the RM of Hanover, and Road 34N (College Avenue in the RM of Hanover and Otterburne Road in the RM of De Salaberry), part of which is also a paved two-lane highway (PTH 59 west to Otterburne).

== Major intersections ==
Division	Location	km	mi	Destinations	Notes
Hanover		0.0	0.0	PTH 12 (MOM's Way) – Steinbach, Sprague; Ridge Road – Kleefeld	Western terminus; road continues west as Ridge Road
Hanover	Friedensfeld	1.6	0.99	Road 35E	Pavement ends
La Broquerie		13.0	8.1	PR 302 – La Broquerie, Zhoda	Eastern terminus
1.000 mi = 1.609 km; 1.000 km = 0.621 mi
