= Friedensfeld, Manitoba =

Friedensfeld
- Location in Manitoba
- Coordinates: 49°28′24″N 96°40′08″W
- Country: Canada
- Province: Manitoba
- Region: Eastman Region
- Census Division: No. 2
- Established: 1891-92

Government
  - Reeve (RM of Hanover): Stan Toews
  - Governing Body: Rural Municipality of Hanover Council
  - MP (Provencher): Ted Falk
  - MLA (Steinbach): Kelvin Goertzen
- Time zone: UTC−6 (CST)
  - Summer (DST): UTC−5 (CDT)
- Postal Code: R0A 1X0
- Area codes: 204, 431
- Website: https://www.hanovermb.ca

Friedensfeld is a settlement in the Rural Municipality of Hanover, Manitoba, Canada. It is located 2.5 kilometres (1.6 miles) south of Steinbach, approximately 1.6 kilometres (1 mile) east of the junction of Provincial Road 303 and Provincial Trunk Highway 12.

== Etymology ==
Friedensfeld comes from the German Friedensfeld, which translates to Peaceful Field or Peaceful Place.

== History ==
The first settlers in the area were German Lutherans from Ukraine, who began to arrive in the area in 1891-92. In 1903, the first Lutheran church, St. Paul's Church was completed and in 1926, a second, St. John's Church, was established. In 1911, Friedensfeld School was established, with enrolment reaching as high as 60 students. It closed in 1966, with the province-wide school consolidation, despite attempts by the community to save it.

== Culture ==
The Friedensfeld Community Centre, formed in 1967 but only opened in 1970, features a large community hall, playground with picnic shelters, and baseball diamonds, which were home to the Friedensfeld Sultans fastball and baseball teams until 2009. The Bantam AA Friedensfeld Sultans won the 2007 AA Western Canadian Baseball Championships. The championship trophy is still located within the trophy case inside the Friedensfeld Hall.
