= Richer, Manitoba =

Local urban district in Manitoba, Canada

Richer
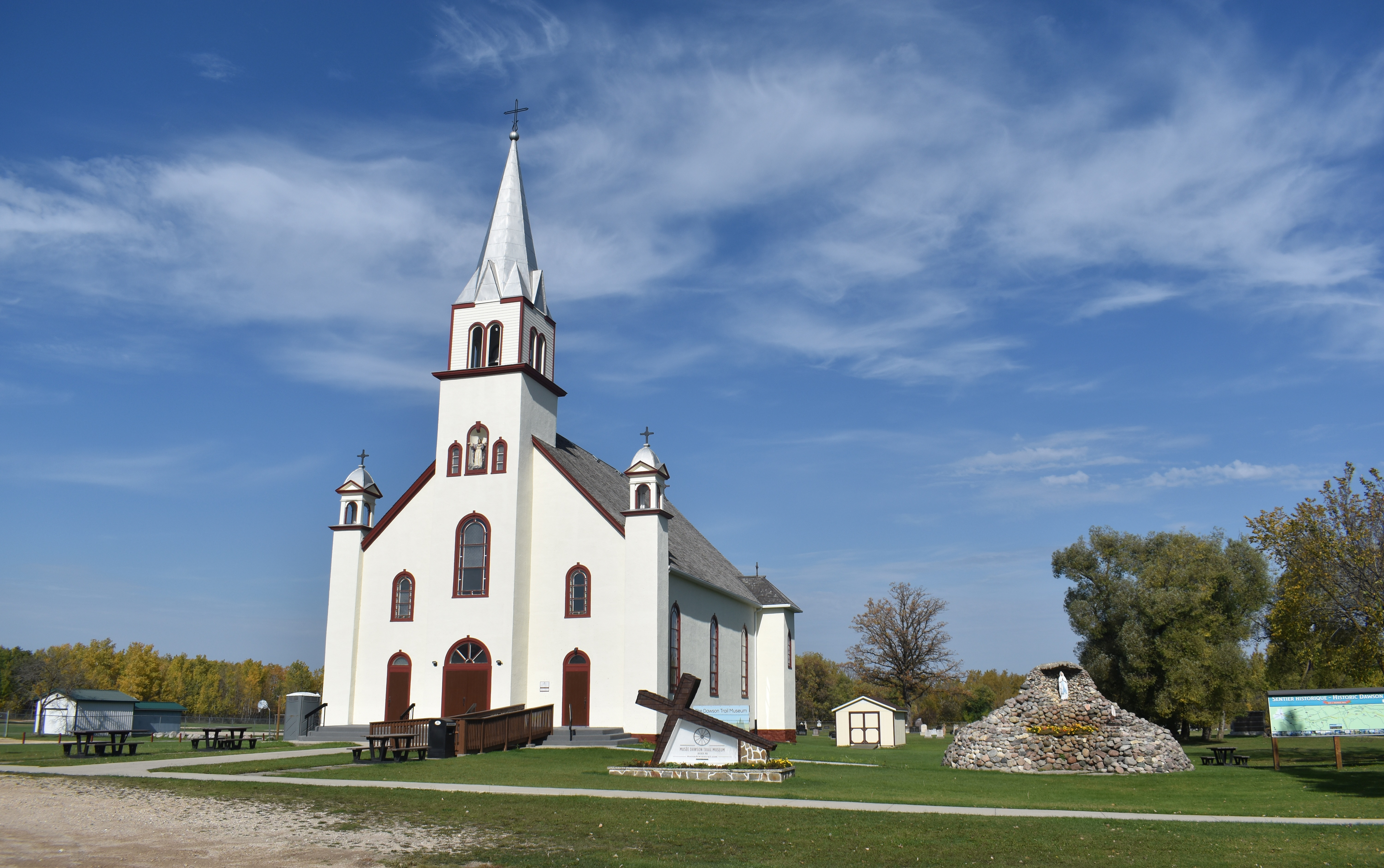
- Aerial view of Richer. The Enfant-Jésus Heritage Site in Richer, this former catholic church now serves as the community's museum.

- Location of Richer in Manitoba
- Coordinates: 49°39′27″N 96°27′25″W
- Country: Canada
- Province: Manitoba
- Region: Eastman
- Rural Municipality: Ste. Anne
- Established: 1905

Government
  - MP (Provencher): Ted Falk (CPC)
  - MLA (Dawson Trail): Bob Lagassé (Independent)

Area
  - Total: 5.37 km^{2} (2.07 sq mi)
- Elevation: 291 m (955 ft)

Population (2021 Census)
  - Total: 607
  - Density: 113/km^{2} (290/sq mi)
- Time zone: UTC-6 (CST)
  - Summer (DST): UTC-5 (CDT)

Richer is a local urban district in southeast Manitoba, almost 42 kilometres (26 mi) east of Winnipeg along Highway 1. It is located in the Rural Municipality of Ste. Anne, at the junction of the Trans-Canada Highway and Provincial Road 302.

== History ==
Richer was originally called Coteau-de-Chênes, then renamed Thibaultville in 1901, until it was finally named Richer, after H. Isaïe Richer, who was the first postmaster in the region. Located on the historic Dawson Trail, Richer is rich in early Canadian history of French-Canadian, English Canadian as well as Aboriginal and Metis peoples.

== Demographics ==
In the 2021 Census of Population conducted by Statistics Canada, Richer had a population of 607 living in 240 of its 252 total private dwellings, a change of 4.3% from its 2016 population of 582. With a land area of 5.37 km^{2} (2.07 sq mi), it had a population density of 113.0/km^{2} (292.8/sq mi) in 2021.

== Services ==
The local Richer School currently has about 150 students, ranging from kindergarten to grade eight. Richer School is part of the Seine River School Division.

Richer also has one of the few wooden Catholic Churches that are more than a hundred years old. The church has been converted to the Dawson Trail Museum and features displays and artifacts depicting the rich history of the region.

== Recreation ==
Richer has three nearby campgrounds: the Rock Garden Campground, Cripple Creek Campground, and the Wild Oaks Campground.

Dawson Trail Park boasts two baseball diamonds, an outdoor skating rink, picnic shelter, a rodeo/riding arena and new and improved playground.

The Mockingjay Pole Archery Club shoots in the park from May until September.

Richer Rough Stock Rodeo takes place every second weekend of August. The Richer Rodeo won Heartland Rodeo's Rodeo of the Year in 2013, 2014, 2016 and 2017.

Winterfest occurring at the end of February or beginning of March.

Each summer the Dawson Trail Museum features an indoor and outdoor farmers market. In the spring and fall they host an Artisan Craft Sale featuring local Crafts and Baking.

== Business ==
Dawson Trail Dispatch is the local newspaper located in Richer, bringing coverage of southeastern Manitoba local news. There is also Burnell’s, a general store, a post office, a number of restaurants, a hotel and a gas station. The Richer Community Club Inc. produces a monthly newsletter called the EnRicher keeping the local residents of the area informed of events and news.
