= Woodlands, Manitoba =

Woodlands
- Location of Woodlands in Manitoba
- Coordinates: 50°12′26″N 97°39′36″W
- Country: Canada
- Province: Manitoba
- Region: Interlake Region
- Census Division: No. 14
- Established: 1874

Government
  - Reeve (RM of Woodlands): Douglas Oliver
  - Governing Body: Rural Municipality of Woodlands Council
  - MP (Selkirk—Interlake—Eastman): James Bezan
  - MLA (Lakeside): Trevor King
- Time zone: UTC−6 (CST)
  - Summer (DST): UTC−5 (CDT)
- Postal Code: R0C 3H0
- Area codes: 204, 431
- NTS Map: 062I04
- GNBC Code: GBENF
- Website: http://www.rmwoodlands.ca

Woodlands is an unincorporated community in the Rural Municipality of Woodlands in the Interlake Region of Manitoba, Canada. It is located approximately 40 kilometres (25 miles) north-west of Winnipeg.

Woodlands was named by D. Porteous, for the surrounding lands to the north, west and east which are wooded. The post office was established in 1874.

Environment Canada's weather radar station that serves the Winnipeg area is located in Woodlands. Woodlands is also home to the Woodlands Pioneer Museum.
