= Rural Municipality of Ste. Anne =

Rural municipality in Manitoba, Canada

Ste. Anne
- Rural municipality
- Rural Municipality of Ste. Anne
- Location of the RM of Ste. Anne in Manitoba
- Coordinates: 49°37′07″N 96°34′15″W
- Country: Canada
- Province: Manitoba
- Region: Eastman
- Incorporated: February 1881
- Amalgamated: 1890
- Re-incorporated: 1908
- Named for: Saint Anne

Government
  - Mayor: Richard Pelletier

Area
  - Land: 476.81 km^{2} (184.10 sq mi)
- Elevation: 263 m (863 ft)

Population (2021)
  - Total: 5,584
  - Density: 10.5/km^{2} (27/sq mi)
- Time zone: UTC-6 (Central Standard Time)
- Postal code: R5H
- Website: rmofsteanne.com

Ste. Anne (French: Municipalité rurale de Sainte-Anne) is a rural municipality (RM) in the Eastman Region of Manitoba, Canada, lying southeast of Winnipeg. The separately administered town of Ste. Anne lies within the geographic borders of the municipality, in its northwestern part.

It includes Paradise Village, a 55-plus retirement community, founded in early 1990, many of whose residents are "snowbirds". The municipality has five privately owned public golf courses—Cottonwood, Oakwood, Ridgewood, Girouxsalem, and Quarry Oaks—and five privately owned campgrounds—Lilac, Wild Oaks, Rock Garden, Ridgewood and Cherry Hill.

The municipality is one of the earliest-settled areas of Manitoba.

== History ==
The first settlers of Ste. Anne arrived in 1856 at Pointe-des-Chênes ('where the oaks meet') from Quebec in search of farmland. The main industry within this initial settlement to the area, which included 198 families, was purposed towards supplying lumber for the construction of the Saint Boniface Cathedral. By the end of the decade, the Hudson's Bay Company established a trading post in the community, which eventually brought the settlement a hotel, general store, and a jail.

The Rural Municipality of Ste. Anne was incorporated in February 1881, but soon after amalgamated with the Rural Municipality of LaBroquerie in 1890. In 1891, the subdistrict of Ste. Anne had a population of 1523. Nearly two decades later, in 1908 the RM of Ste. Anne became re-established by an Act of the Legislature.

== Communities ==
- Giroux
- Greenland, Manitoba
- La Coulée
- Richer
- St. Raymond

== Demographics ==
In the 2021 Census of Population conducted by Statistics Canada, Ste. Anne had a population of 5,584 living in 1,981 of its 2,092 total private dwellings, a change of 11.6% from its 2016 population of 5,003. With a land area of 476.81 km^{2} (184.10 sq mi), it had a population density of 11.7/km^{2} (30.3/sq mi) in 2021.

== See also ==
- Laurie Evans
- List of francophone communities in Manitoba
- Seine River (Manitoba)
