= Division No. 20, Manitoba =

Census division in Canada

Coordinates: 52°06′N 100°51′W

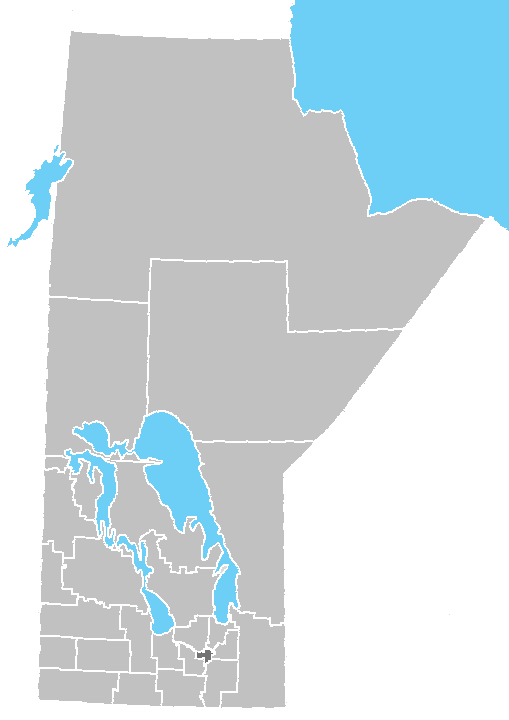

Census Division No. 20 (Swan River) is a census division located within the Parkland Region of the province of Manitoba. Unlike in some other provinces, census divisions do not reflect the organization of local government in Manitoba. These areas exist solely for the purposes of statistical analysis and presentation; they have no government of their own.

The population of the division in the 2006 census was 10,405. The economic bases of the region is mixed grain, livestock and forestry. It also includes all of Duck Mountain Provincial Park.

== Demographics ==
In the 2021 Census of Population conducted by Statistics Canada, Division No. 20 had a population of 9,634 living in 4,174 of its 4,894 total private dwellings, a change of 0.1% from its 2016 population of 9,621. With a land area of 9,825.79 km^{2} (3,793.76 sq mi), it had a population density of 1.0/km^{2} (2.5/sq mi) in 2021.

== Towns ==
- Swan River

== Unincorporated communities ==
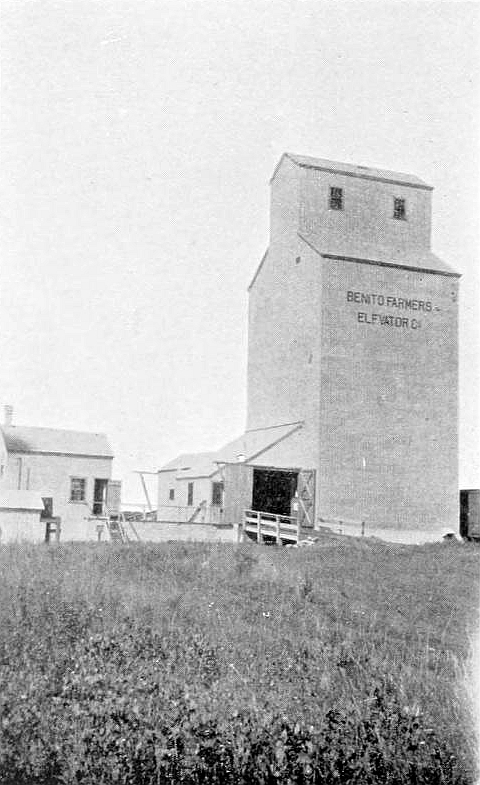
Grain elevator in Benito in 1914

- Benito
- Bowsman
- Minitonas

== Municipalities ==
- Minitonas – Bowsman
- Mountain
- Swan Valley West

== First Nations communities ==
- Wuskwi Sipihk First Nation

== Unorganized areas ==
- Unorganized North Division No. 20
- Unorganized South Division No. 20
