= Manitoba Provincial Road 215 =

Provincial road in Manitoba, Canada

Provincial Road 215
- PR 200 highlighted in red

Route information
- Maintained by Manitoba Infrastructure
- Length: 10.1 km (6.3 mi)
- Existed: 1966–present

Major junctions
- West end: PTH 12 near Tyndall–Garson
- East end: PTH 44 / PR 302 south in Beausejour

Location
- Country: Canada
- Province: Manitoba
- Rural municipalities: Brokenhead
- Towns: Beausejour

Highway system
- Provincial highways in Manitoba; Winnipeg City Routes
| ← PR 214 | → PR 216 |

Provincial Road 215 (PR 215) is a short provincial road in the Eastman Region of the Canadian province of Manitoba.

The road begins at Provincial Trunk Highway (PTH) 12, the boundary between the Rural Municipalities of Brokenhead and Springfield, and runs approximately 8 kilometres (5 mi) east to the town of Beausejour. It passes through the town as Park Avenue and ends at the town's east end at a junction with PTH 44 and PR 302.

PR 215 runs exactly parallel to the PTH 12/PTH 44 multiplex 1.6 kilometres (1 mi) to the north and serves as a business route through Beausejour for both highways. It was first listed on Manitoba's official highway map in 1966.

== Major intersections ==
| Division | Location | km | mi | Destinations | Notes |
|---|---|---|---|---|---|
| Brokenhead | | 0.0 | 0.0 | PTH 12 – Steinbach, Lockport | Western terminus; road continues west as Boundary Road |
| Town of Beausejour | | 10.1 | 6.3 | PTH 44 – Whitemouth, Grand Beach; PR 302 south – Vivian | Eastern terminus; road continues as PTH 44 east |
1.000 mi = 1.609 km; 1.000 km = 0.621 mi
