= Unorganized North Division No. 20, Manitoba =

Division No. 20, Unorganized, North Part is an unorganized area in northwestern Manitoba. It has a population of 120 as of 2011, and an area of 1,760.53 km^{2}.
