= La Broquerie =

- Local Urban District
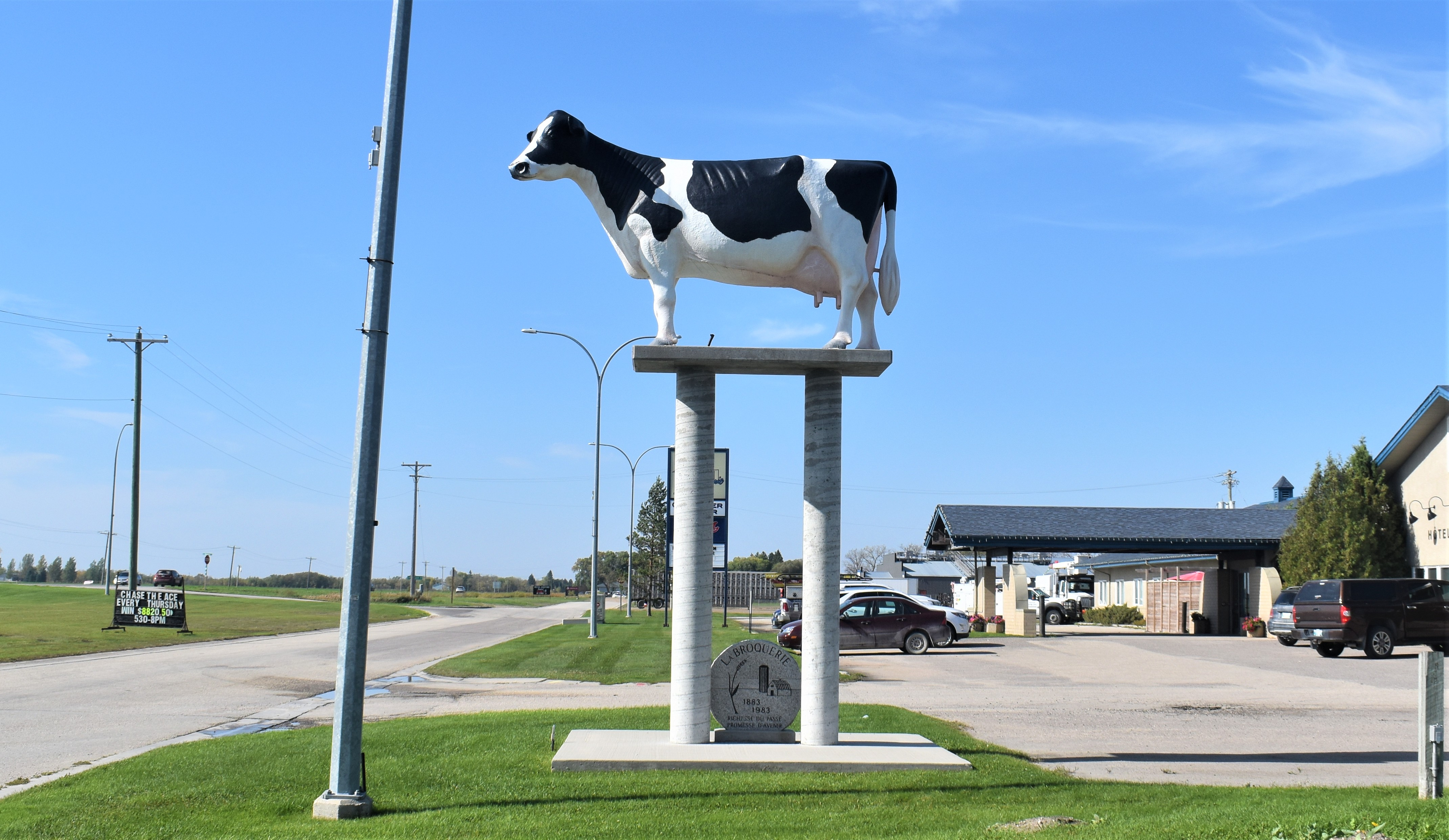
- Brisette the Cow, the roadside attraction in La Broquerie.

- Location of La Broquerie in Manitoba
- Coordinates: 49°31′23″N 96°30′38″W
- Country: Canada
- Province: Manitoba
- Region: Eastman
- Established: 1883

Government
  - MP (Provencher): Ted Falk (CPC)
  - MLA (La Verendrye): Konrad Narth (PC)

Area
  - Total: 8.02 km^{2} (3.10 sq mi)
- Elevation: 268 m (879 ft)

Population (2021 Census)
  - Total: 1,715
  - Density: 213.9/km^{2} (554/sq mi)
- Time zone: UTC-6 (CST)
  - Summer (DST): UTC-5 (CDT)
- Former name: Carleton
- Website: labroquerie.com/

La Broquerie is a local urban district in the Rural Municipality of La Broquerie, Manitoba, Canada. It is a predominantly Francophone community located approximately 10 kilometres east of Steinbach, Manitoba and 70 kilometres southeast of the provincial capital Winnipeg, at the confluence of Highways 52, 210, and 302.

For most of the community's history, La Broquerie has been ranked as Manitoba's largest dairy producer.

The area's geography makes it attractive to winter sports. One can snowmobile and cross-country ski along the nature trails in the town as well as throughout the entire Sandilands Provincial Forest area. The community also has a golf course, La Verendrye Golf, named after the family of 18th century explorers. The St. Joachim Museum contains historic artifacts pertaining to the history of the French and Belgian settlers since 1877.

== History ==
The area of La Broquerie was first surveyed for settlement between 1874 and 1876. Fires had burned through the region earlier, either of natural causes or set by Indigenous peoples to bring in deer and moose to hunt on the cleared lands. When the land was surveyed it was described as being thick in trees that could be used for lumber and the land was either sandy and high or quite swampy and therefore considered unsuitable for agriculture.

Archbishop Alexandre-Antonin Taché had dreams of making the southeastern region of Manitoba a francophone enclave in Manitoba, following earlier settlement near Ste. Anne. Mennonite settlers were eventually given the right to settle lands in the East Reserve in what would later become the Rural Municipality of Hanover and Steinbach. He was then concerned about continuing Anglo-Saxon immigration from Ontario to Manitoba to the diminishment of French and Catholic culture in Manitoba. Therefore, he worked with the federal government and other bishops in Quebec towards finding French speaking settlers for the region and new francophone arrivals peaked between 1873 and 1879. When Manitoba first drew the maps for Manitoba in 1880, the community was first named Carleton before Member of Parliament A.A.C. Larivière had it changed to honour Joseph de Labroquerie (1759-1830), who played an important role in the life of his nephew Archbishop Alexandre-Antonin Taché of St. Boniface. In 1882, a large log drive was reported in the community as loggers shipped the area's greatest natural resource down the Seine River to Saint Boniface.

With French settlers continuing to arrive in the southeast in the Ste. Anne and La Broquerie areas, eventually local residents came to the decision to split the governance of the two communities of Ste. Anne and La Broquerie and divided the region up. A public road was built to connect the two communities and plans were made for the establishment of a school district. Optimism for the region grew in 1882, as 80 new residents arrived in La Broquerie. In 1883, Taché declared La Broquerie as "St. Joachim’s mission," and a new St-Joachim Catholic Parish was built in 1884, while a year later the first post office was finally established. As the population grew in the area, it was clear a new larger church would be needed to accommodate the parishioners and this was built between 1898 and 1901, while also being enlarged in the 1920s. A new larger school was built later in 1907.

Economically, the region's greatest resource of lumber played a key role in the early growth of the community and several residents established sawmills. 25,000 cords of wood were cut during the winter of 1896-97 in the La Broquerie area. Agriculture was also of importance, a bumper crop of wheat earlier in 1882 led local farmers to declare in Manitoban newspapers that they had the best wheat in Manitoba. Dairy was a major component of the community's agricultural sector. The first farmers began by selling excess milk as butter to Steinbach or St. Boniface. Eventually, local dairy producers decided it would be more profitable to sell the surplus milk as cheese and two cheese factories were opened in the community in 1898 and 1903.

Like many communities in the Canadian Prairies, the railway was critical for growth of the population and local economies. La Broquerie residents recognized this and began lobbying as early as the 1880s for a railway to come through the community. The Canadian Northern Railway company worked to clear and build a railway in 1898 from St. Boniface to La Broquerie and which would initially only go as far as Marchand, Manitoba. The first trains were running later that year. The railway which mainly carried lumber and passengers, was extended to Warroad, Minnesota the following year. With a large Francophone population, La Broquerie has been celebrating Saint-Jean-Baptiste Day since 1897.

== Demographics ==
Population Growth
Year	Pop.	±%
2006	753	—
2011	1,073	+42.5%
2016	1,401	+30.6%
2021	1,715	+22.4%

As of the 2021 Census, La Broquerie has a population of 1,715 living in 620 of its 653 total private dwellings, a change of 22.4% from its 2016 population of 1,401. With a land area of 8.02 km^{2} (3.10 sq mi), it has a population density of 213.8/km^{2} (553.8/sq mi) in 2021.

== Sports ==
Hockey is a huge part of life in La Broquerie and has been for 60 years. In the early 1950s, local residents spent months cutting and logging wood for the building of a new arena. The arena was built by hand with the help of countless local volunteers. Over the years, the arena burnt down on three occasions, and on all three occasions, local residents lobbied local businessmen and different levels of government to rebuild it. The community's arena and community club is known as the Hylife Centre.

The volunteer board that has been overseeing the entire hockey program for 60 years is the Club Sportif.

The local hockey team is known as the "Habs". This year, every age level has at least one Habs team, and some have two, starting with the Timbits (age 4–6) all the way to the Senior Habs, who play hockey in the Carillon Senior Hockey League.

The Senior Habs have won five league championships in the past ten years. In 2006–2007, the Habs finished in first place in the league standings, sweeping the league championship finals, and winning the Provincial Senior "A" hockey championship.

The La Broquerie Habs Junior B team will debut as an expansion team in the 2024–25 season of the Capital Region Junior Hockey League.

== Notable people ==
- Mélanie Rocan, painter
- Daniel Tetrault, hockey player
- Albert Vielfaure, politician
