= Division No. 16, Manitoba =

Census division in Canada

Coordinates: 50°59′N 101°03′W

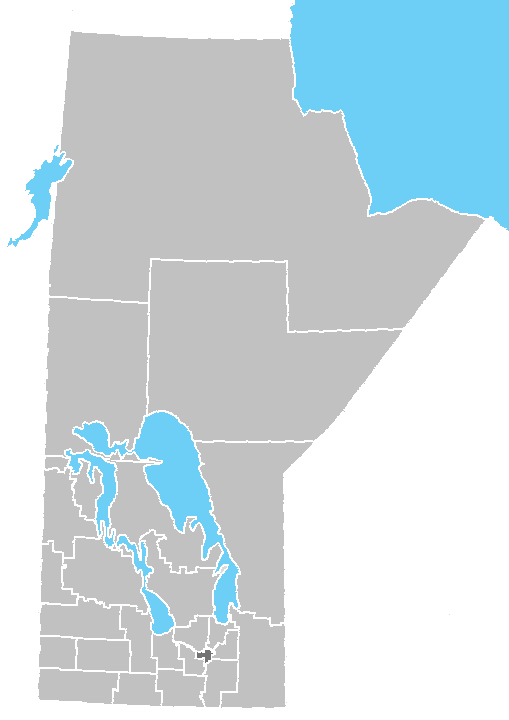

Census Division No. 16 is a census division located within the Parklands Region of the province of Manitoba, Canada. Unlike in some other provinces, census divisions do not reflect the organization of local government in Manitoba. These areas exist solely for the purposes of statistical analysis and presentation; they have no government of their own.

The economy of the area is agriculture and livestock. The population of the region as of the 2006 census was 9,945. Also included in the division are the main reserves of the Gamblers First Nation, the Tootinaowaziibeeng First Nation (Valley River), and the Waywayseecappo First Nation.

== Demographics ==
In the 2021 Census of Population conducted by Statistics Canada, Division No. 16 had a population of 9,945 living in 4,216 of its 5,087 total private dwellings, a change of 1% from its 2016 population of 9,848. With a land area of 4,706.83 km^{2} (1,817.32 sq mi), it had a population density of 2.1/km^{2} (5.5/sq mi) in 2021.

== Unincorporated communities ==
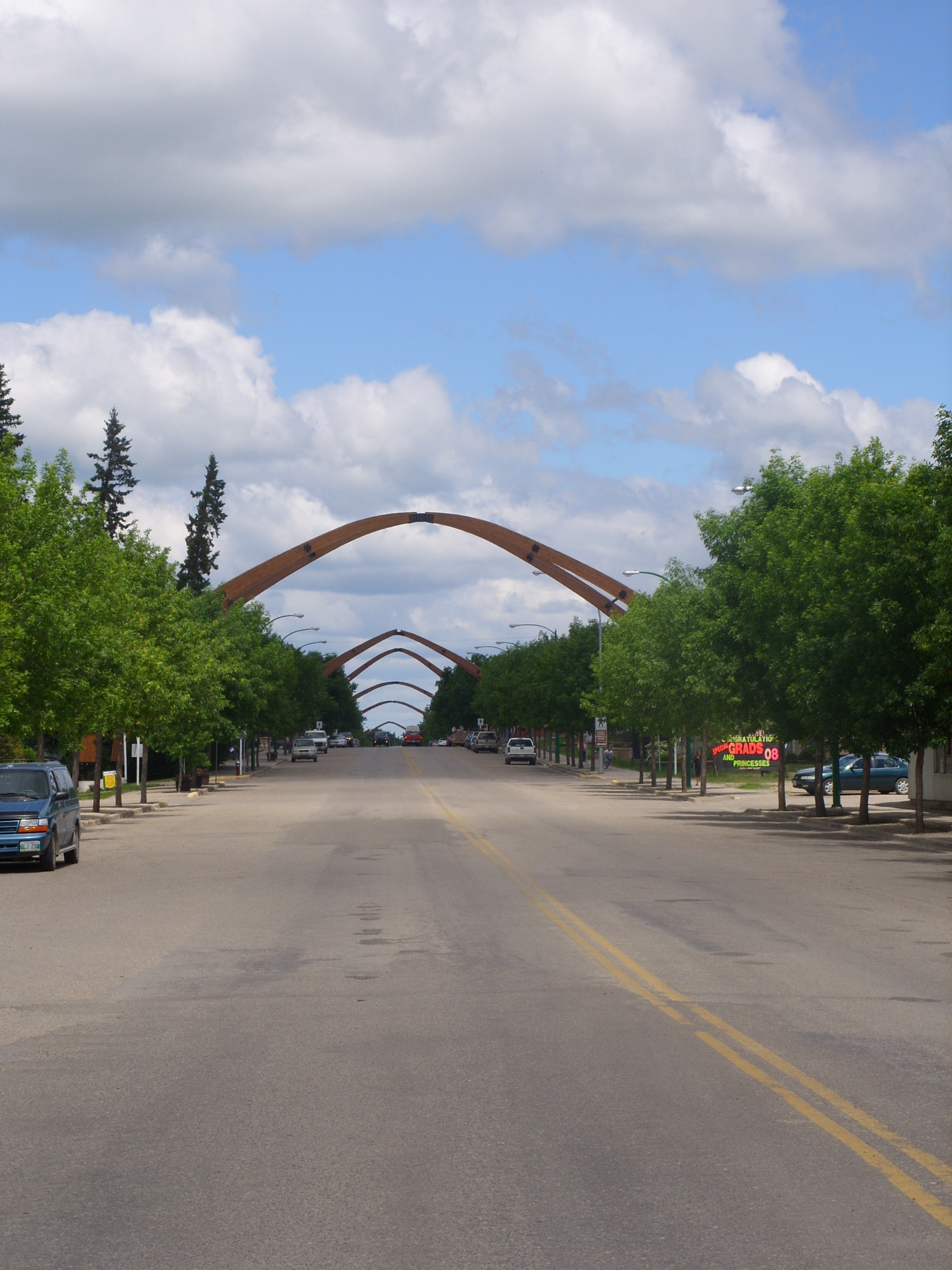
Main Street in Russell

- Binscarth
- Roblin
- Rossburn
- Russell

== Municipalities ==
- Roblin
- Riding Mountain West
- Rossburn
- Russell – Binscarth

== Reserves ==
- Gambler 63 (part)
- Valley River 63A
- Waywayseecappo First Nation
