= Zhoda =

Community in Manitoba, Canada

Coordinates: 49°17′04″N 96°30′38″W

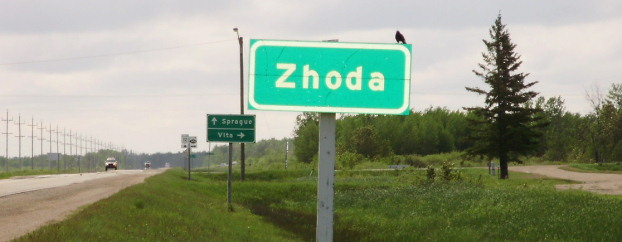

Location of Zhoda in Manitoba

Zhoda is a community in southeastern Manitoba, Canada, approximately 20 kilometres (12 mi) north of the town of Vita. Although "Zhoda Corner" is situated at the intersection of PTH 12 and Manitoba Provincial Road 302, in the Rural Municipality of La Broquerie, the "heart" of Zhoda is the area located near the Zhoda Community Hall and the Ukrainian Catholic Church in the centre of the community, which is also part of the Rural Municipality of Stuartburn.

Zhoda—which means 'agreement' in Ukrainian—was first settled mostly by Ukrainian farmers around 1909. Since then, many families have left farming and moved away, and the current residents come from a variety of ethnic backgrounds. The area hosts a few businesses, including an auto shop, a well drilling business, a scrap recycling yard, a racehorse stable, several ranches, hobby farms and hog barns.

== Climate ==
Climate data for Zhoda
Month	Jan	Feb	Mar	Apr	May	Jun	Jul	Aug	Sep	Oct	Nov	Dec	Year
Record high °C (°F)	7 (45)	11 (52)	17 (63)	31 (88)	33.5 (92.3)	36.5 (97.7)	36 (97)	38.5 (101.3)	32 (90)	30.5 (86.9)	19.5 (67.1)	7.5 (45.5)	38.5 (101.3)
Mean daily maximum °C (°F)	−11 (12)	−6.8 (19.8)	0.6 (33.1)	10.5 (50.9)	19.2 (66.6)	23.2 (73.8)	25.1 (77.2)	25 (77)	18.4 (65.1)	10.5 (50.9)	−1.4 (29.5)	−8.4 (16.9)	8.7 (47.7)
Daily mean °C (°F)	−16.6 (2.1)	−12.4 (9.7)	−4.6 (23.7)	4.3 (39.7)	12.3 (54.1)	16.9 (62.4)	18.8 (65.8)	18.2 (64.8)	12.2 (54.0)	5.1 (41.2)	−5.5 (22.1)	−13.1 (8.4)	3 (37)
Mean daily minimum °C (°F)	−22.1 (−7.8)	−18 (0)	−9.7 (14.5)	−1.9 (28.6)	5.5 (41.9)	10.6 (51.1)	12.5 (54.5)	11.4 (52.5)	6 (43)	−0.4 (31.3)	−9.7 (14.5)	−17.7 (0.1)	−2.8 (27.0)
Record low °C (°F)	−43 (−45)	−45 (−49)	−37.5 (−35.5)	−22.5 (−8.5)	−8 (18)	−2 (28)	2 (36)	0 (32)	−8 (18)	−22 (−8)	−39.5 (−39.1)	−41 (−42)	−45 (−49)
Average precipitation mm (inches)	20.8 (0.82)	17.9 (0.70)	22 (0.9)	31.1 (1.22)	61.7 (2.43)	101.1 (3.98)	89.3 (3.52)	72.4 (2.85)	65.4 (2.57)	46.4 (1.83)	30.6 (1.20)	22 (0.9)	580.6 (22.86)
Source: Environment Canada
