= Unorganized South Division No. 20, Manitoba =

Division No. 20, Unorganized, South Part is an unorganized area in northwestern Manitoba. Unlike in some other provinces, census divisions do not reflect the organization of local government in Manitoba. These areas exist solely for the purposes of statistical analysis and presentation; they have no government of their own in any way whatsoever.

In 2011, it had a population of 82 and a land area of 2,571.67 km^{2}.
