= Division No. 2, Manitoba =

Census division in Canada

Coordinates: 49°26′N 96°51′W

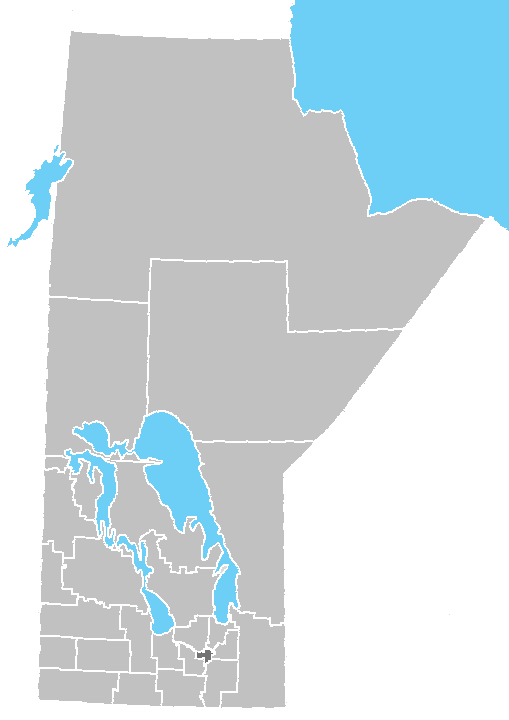

Census Division No. 2 (Steinbach Area) is a census division located within the Eastman Region in the Canadian province of Manitoba. Unlike in some other provinces, census divisions do not reflect the organization of local government in Manitoba. These areas exist solely for the purposes of statistical analysis and presentation; they have no government of their own.

It is located between the city of Winnipeg, the Red River Valley and the US–Canada border.

The city of Steinbach is the largest population centre in the region. The economy of the area is mainly farming. Also included in the division are two of the three reserves of the Roseau River Anishinabe First Nation. The Trans-Canada Highway runs through Eastman Region.

== Demographics ==
In the 2021 Census of Population conducted by Statistics Canada, Division No. 2 had a population of 83,878 living in 28,643 of its 29,918 total private dwellings, a change of 11% from its 2016 population of 75,571. With a land area of 4,420.93 km^{2} (1,706.93 sq mi), it had a population density of 19.0/km^{2} (49.1/sq mi) in 2021.

== Cities ==
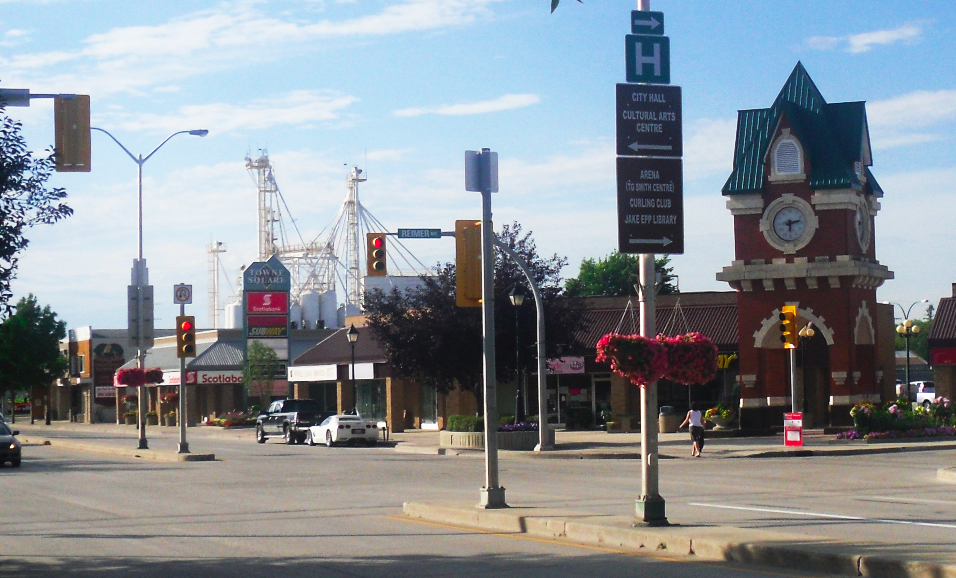
Main Street in Steinbach

- Steinbach

== Towns ==
- Niverville
- Ste. Anne

== Villages ==
- St.-Pierre-Jolys

== Rural municipalities ==
- De Salaberry
- Emerson – Franklin (part in Division No. 3)
- Hanover
- La Broquerie
- Ritchot
- Ste. Anne
- Taché

== First Nations reserves ==
- Roseau Rapids 2A
- Roseau River 2
