= Division No. 15, Manitoba =

Census division in Canada

Coordinates: 50°23′43″N 100°22′08″W

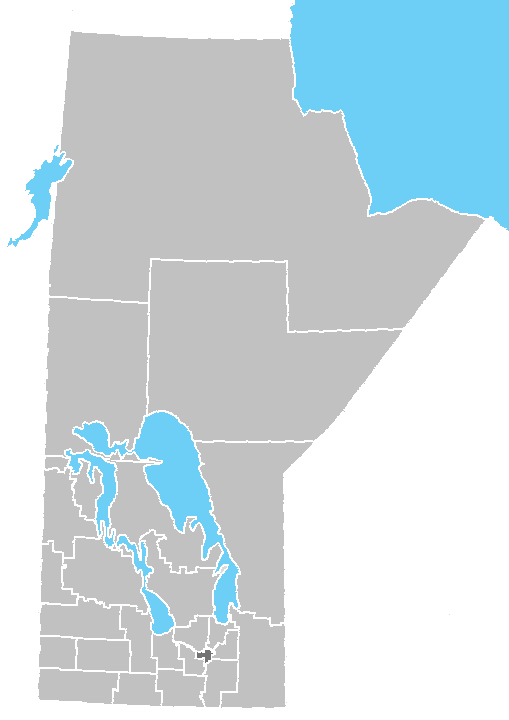

Census Division No. 15 (Neepawa) is a census division located within the Westman Region of the province of Manitoba, Canada. Unlike in some other provinces, census divisions do not reflect the organization of local government in Manitoba. These areas exist solely for the purposes of statistical analysis and presentation; they have no government of their own.

The economy of the region is based on agriculture, livestock and hog processing. The population of the area based on the 2021 census was 23,304. Also included in the division are the main reserves of the Birdtail Sioux First Nation, the Keeseekoowenin Ojibway First Nation, and the Rolling River First Nation.

== Demographics ==
In the 2021 Census of Population conducted by Statistics Canada, Division No. 15 had a population of 23,304 living in 9,193 of its 11,472 total private dwellings, a change of 9% from its 2016 population of 21,379. With a land area of 8,744.51 km^{2} (3,376.27 sq mi), it had a population density of 2.7/km^{2} (6.9/sq mi) in 2021.

== Towns ==
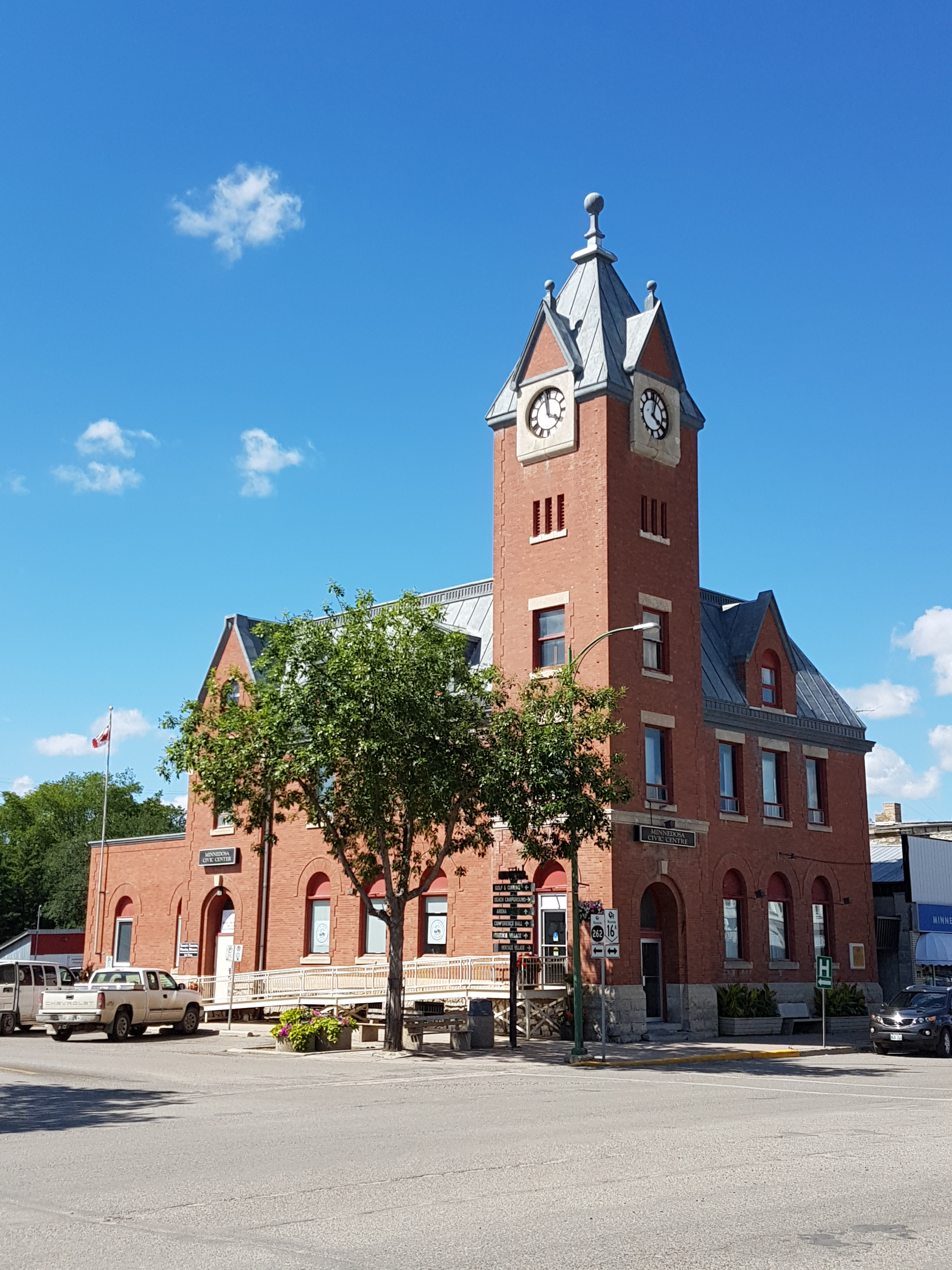
Dominion Post Office in Minnedosa

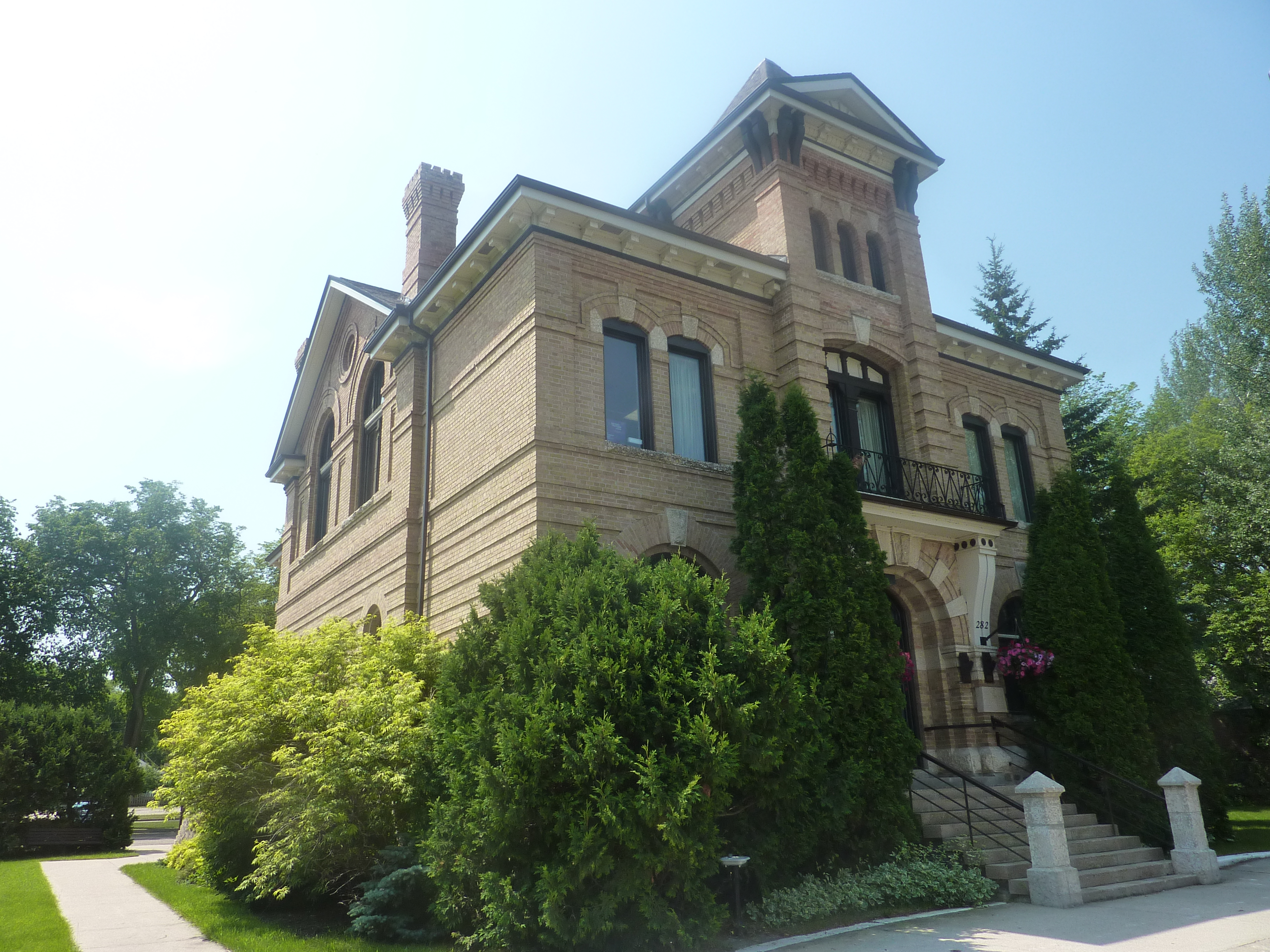
Courthouse in Neepawa

- Minnedosa
- Neepawa

== Unincorporated communities ==
- Birtle
- Erickson
- Hamiota
- Rapid City
- Shoal Lake
- St. Lazare

== Municipalities ==
- Clanwilliam – Erickson
- Ellice – Archie
- Hamiota
- Harrison Park
- Minto – Odanah
- North Cypress-Langford (part in Division No. 7)
- Oakview
- Prairie View
- Rosedale
- Yellowhead

== Reserves ==
- Birdtail Creek 57
- Gambler 63 (part)
- Keeseekoowenin 61
- Rolling River 67
- Rolling River 67B
