= Seine River (Manitoba) =

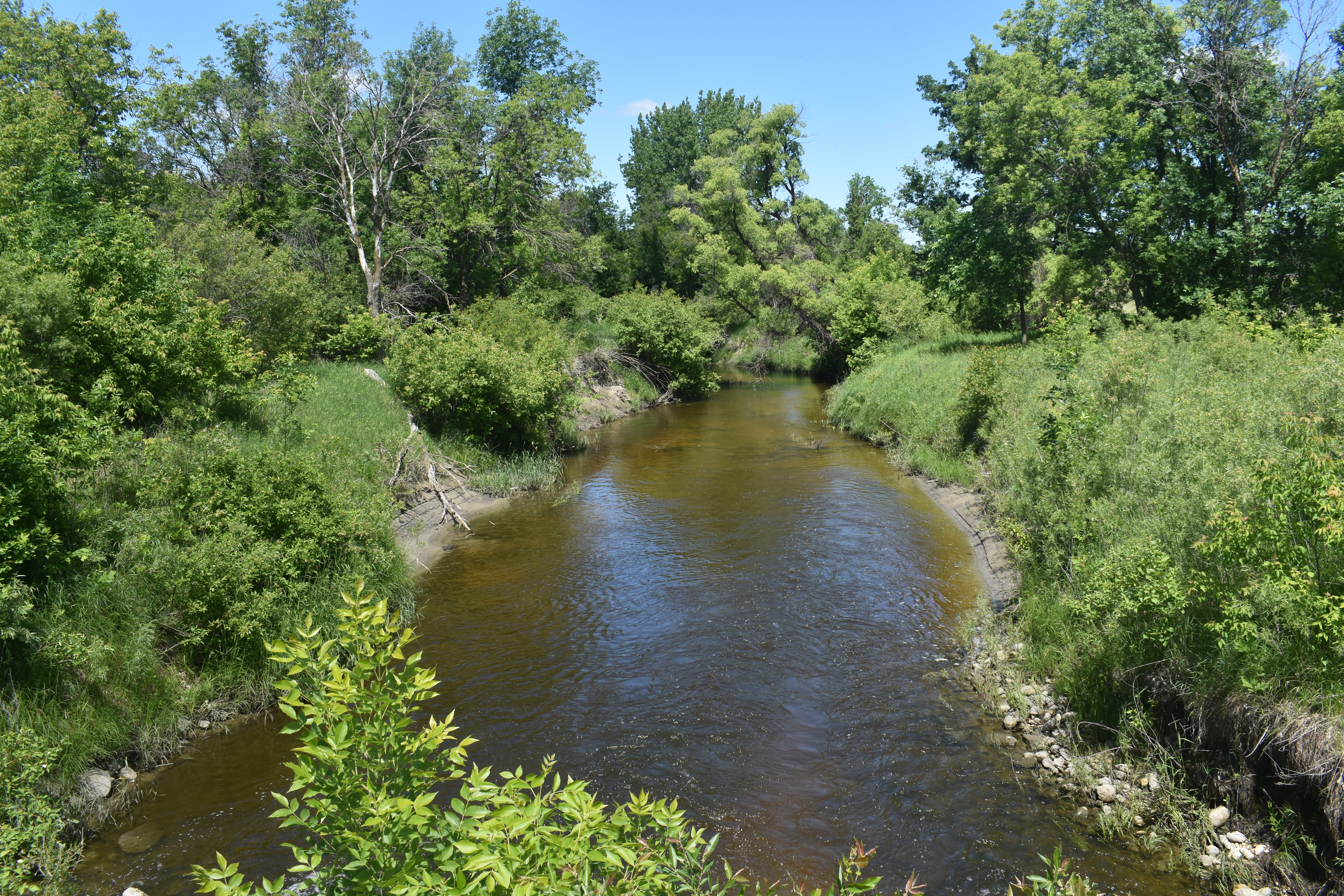
- The Seine River flowing under a road east of La Broquerie.

Location
- Country: Canada
- Province: Manitoba

Physical characteristics
- Source: Marchand, Manitoba area
  - coordinates: 49°25′00″N 96°27′37″W
  - elevation: 302 m (991 ft)
- Mouth: Red River of the North
  - location: Saint Boniface, Winnipeg, Manitoba
  - coordinates: 49°54′00″N 97°06′36″W
  - elevation: 226 m (741 ft)
- Basin size: 2,509 km^{2} (969 sq mi)

Basin features
- River system: Red River

The Seine River (French: Rivière Seine) is a tributary of the Red River of the North that runs through southeastern Manitoba, Canada. It is one of the four rivers that flows in the city of Winnipeg.

The river's source is in the Sandilands Provincial Forest near Steinbach and passes by or through the communities of Marchand, La Broquerie, Ste. Anne, and Lorette before reaching the Red River Floodway near the Winnipeg city limits. At this point the river's channel is diverted under the Floodway into what is known as the "Seine River Siphon", which allows a flow of up to 4.5 cubic metres per second (160 cu ft/s); any additional flow is diverted onto the Floodway. During a wet spring, the river often overflows its banks, sometimes flooding nearby houses. During a dry summer, the river can be reduced to a trickle in Winnipeg, due to the water which is diverted away. A project to improve the flow of water through the floodway siphon was completed in 2010 and increased the flow of water, reducing the number of dry years on the river in Winnipeg.

Within the city, the Seine travels a meandering course, reaching the Red River at St. Boniface just north of The Forks after passing through Niakwa Country Club, St. Boniface Golf Club and the Windsor Park Golf Course. The lower section of its course in the city marks the east–west boundary between the southern section of St. Boniface and the suburb of St. Vital. It is a typical meandering river with a single main channel embanked within a flat, shallow valley. The river's banks are heavily treed, but pollution has been an issue in the city of Winnipeg.

== See also ==
- List of rivers of Manitoba
