= Division No. 12, Manitoba =

Census division in Canada

Coordinates: 50°02′23″N 96°41′36″W

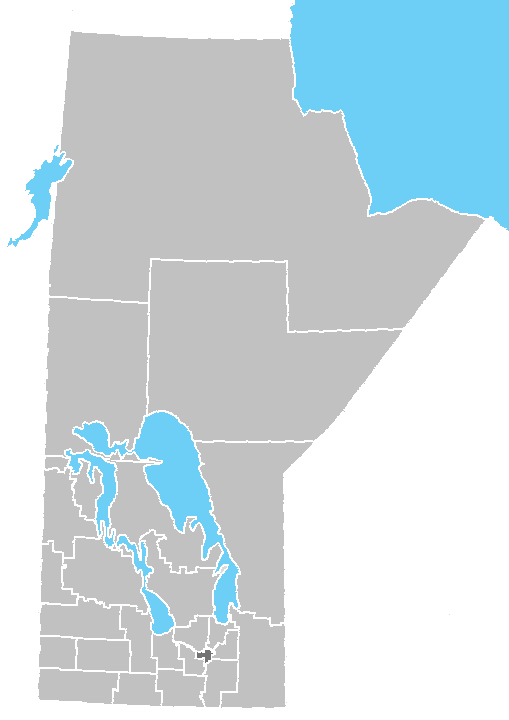

Census Division No. 12 (Beausejour Area) is a census division located within the Eastman Region of the province of Manitoba, Canada. Unlike in some other provinces, census divisions do not reflect the organization of local government in Manitoba. These areas exist solely for the purposes of statistical analysis and presentation; they have no government of their own.

The economy of the area consists of agriculture and livestock. The area's population as of the 2006 census was 19,753.

== Demographics ==
In the 2021 Census of Population conducted by Statistics Canada, Division No. 12 had a population of 24,863 living in 9,331 of its 9,777 total private dwellings, a change of 5% from its 2016 population of 23,683. With a land area of 1,851.28 km^{2} (714.78 sq mi), it had a population density of 13.4/km^{2} (34.8/sq mi) in 2021.

== Towns ==
- Beausejour

== Municipalities ==
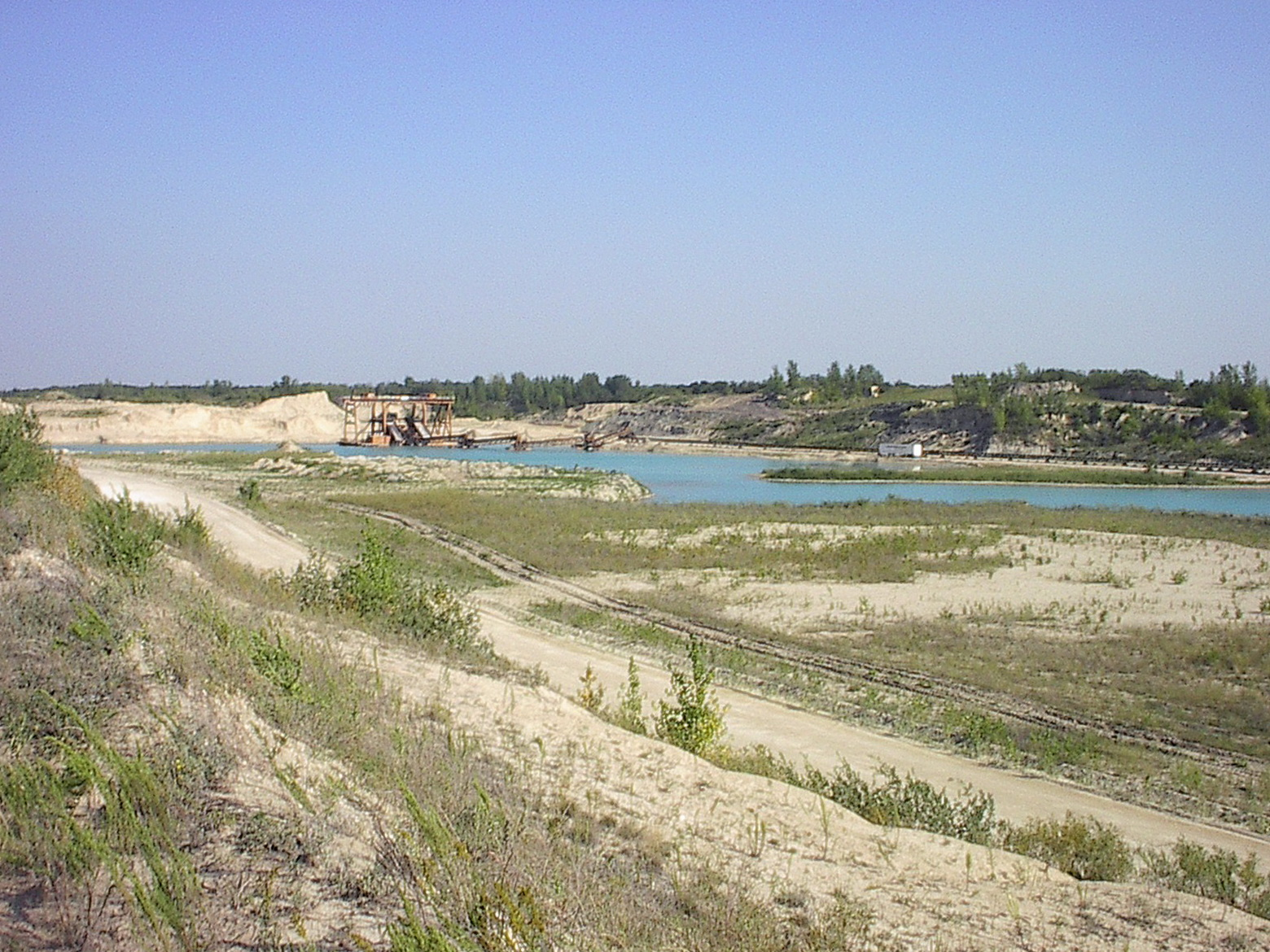
Miracle Ranch in the Rural Municipality of Springfield

- Brokenhead
- Springfield
