= Division No. 10, Manitoba =

Census division in Canada

Coordinates: 49°49′N 97°33′W

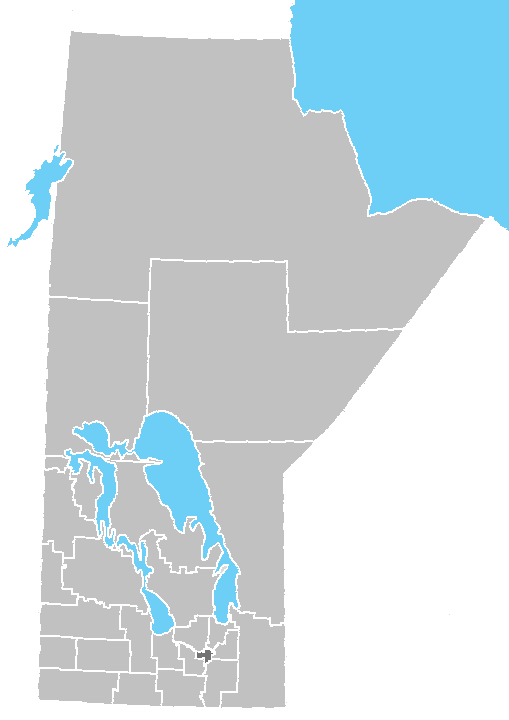

Census Division No. 10 (Whitehorse Plains) is a census division located within the Central Plains Region of the Province of Manitoba, Canada. Unlike in some other provinces, census divisions do not reflect the organization of local government in Manitoba. These areas exist solely for the purposes of statistical analysis and presentation; they have no government of their own.

The economic base of the region is agriculture, livestock and manufacturing. The population of the area in 2006 census was 9,902.

== Demographics ==
In the 2021 Census of Population conducted by Statistics Canada, Division No. 10 had a population of 12,913 living in 4,048 of its 4,179 total private dwellings, a change of 8.1% from its 2016 population of 11,941. With a land area of 1,914.19 km^{2} (739.07 sq mi), it had a population density of 6.7/km^{2} (17.5/sq mi) in 2021.

== Municipalities ==
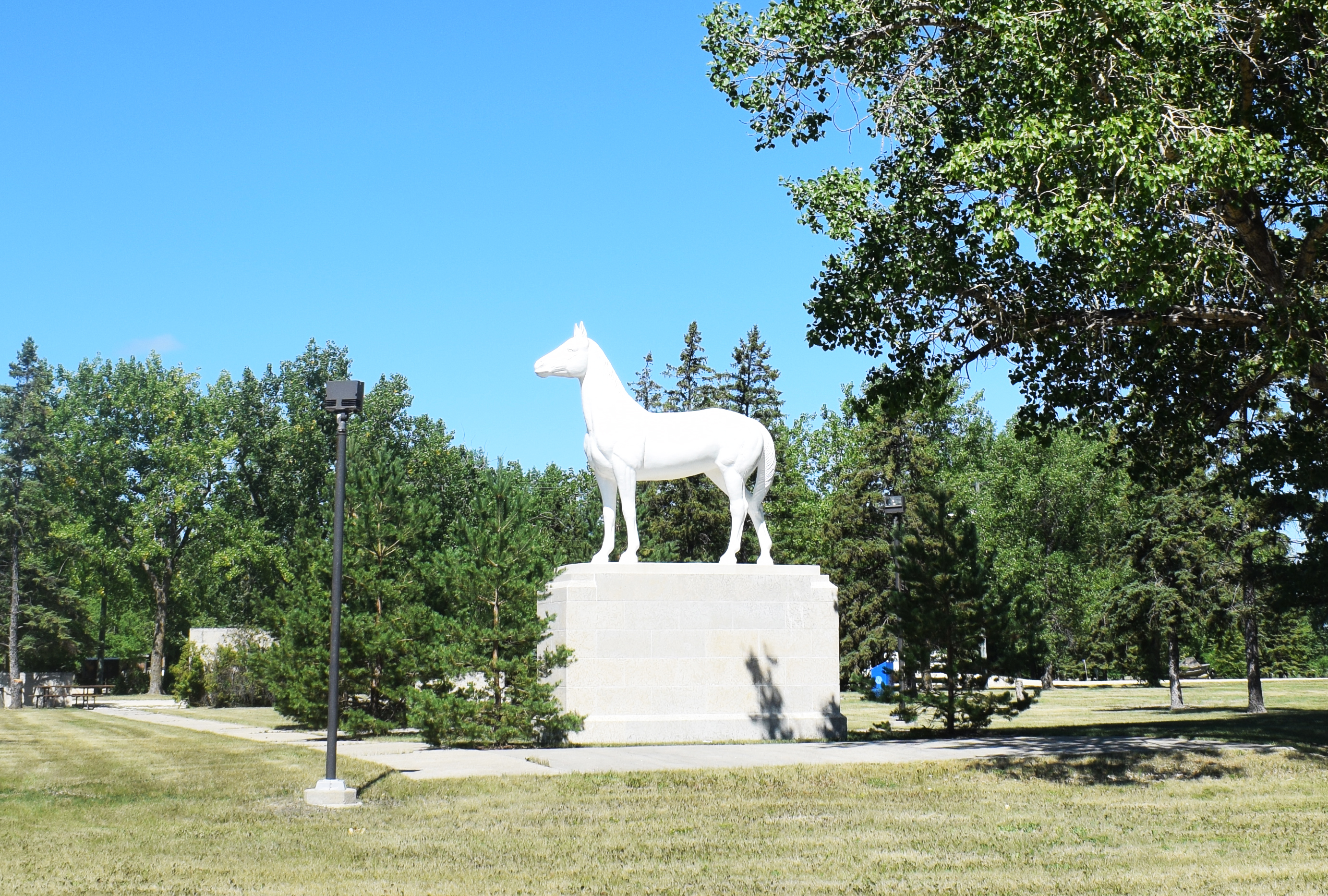
White horse statue in the Rural Municipality of St. François Xavier

- Cartier
- Macdonald
- St. François Xavier
