= Division No. 11, Manitoba =

Census division in Canada

Coordinates: 49°51′00″N 97°12′30″W

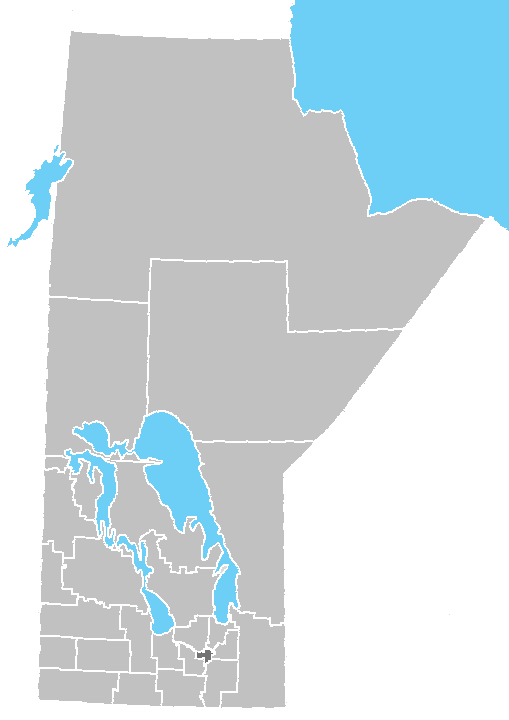

Census Division No. 11 (Winnipeg) is a census division centred on the Winnipeg Capital Region of the province of Manitoba, Canada. Unlike in some other provinces, census divisions do not reflect the organization of local government in Manitoba. These areas exist solely for the purposes of statistical analysis and presentation; they have no government of their own.

The City of Winnipeg is the Capital city of the province and comprises the largest portion of the census division. The population of the area as of the 2006 census was 636,177. The area's economic base is very diversified, covering financial, manufacturing, transportation, food and beverage production, retail and tourism. It is coextensive with the 1972-1993 boundaries of Winnipeg, including Headingley which is currently a separate rural municipality.

== Demographics ==
In the 2021 Census of Population conducted by Statistics Canada, Division No. 11 had a population of 753,938 living in 301,738 of its 316,807 total private dwellings, a change of 6.4% from its 2016 population of 708,823. With a land area of 569.31 km^{2} (219.81 sq mi), it had a population density of 1,324.3/km^{2} (3,429.9/sq mi) in 2021.

== Cities ==
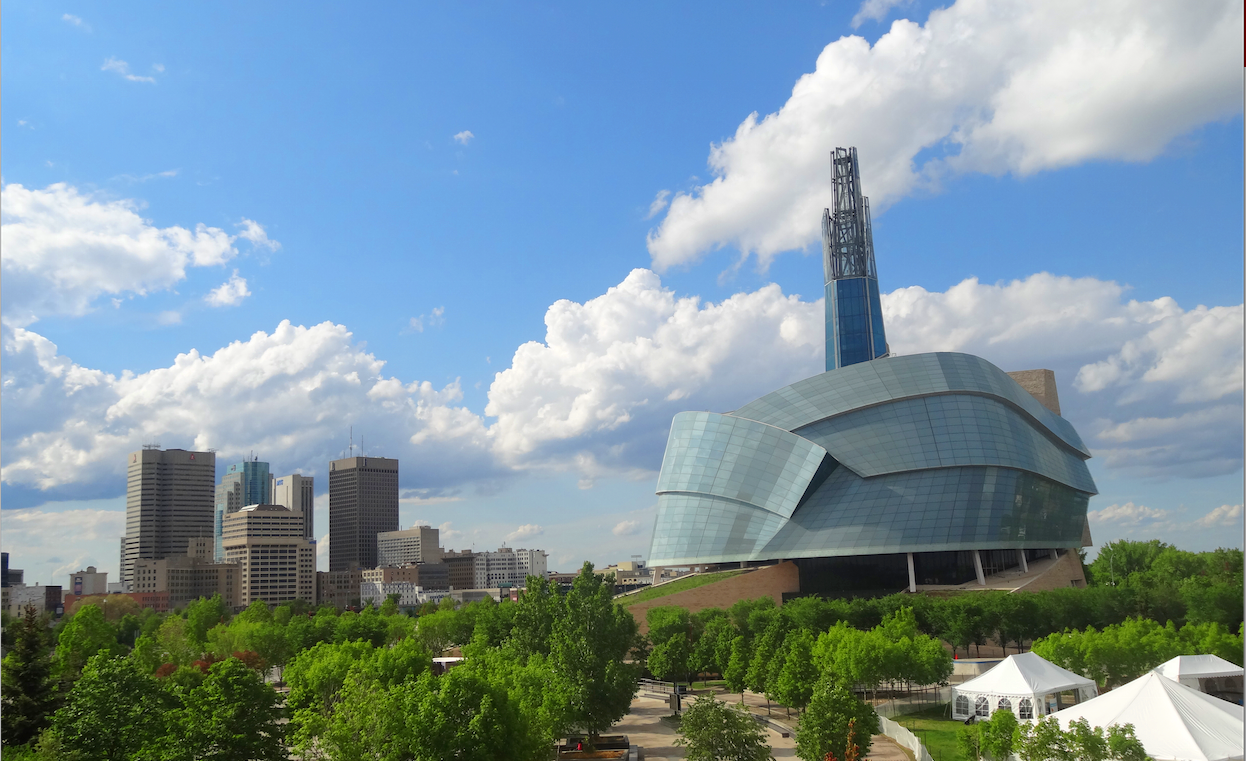
Winnipeg

- Winnipeg

== Municipalities ==
- Headingley
