= Division No. 13, Manitoba =

Census division in Canada

Coordinates: 50°15′N 96°44′W

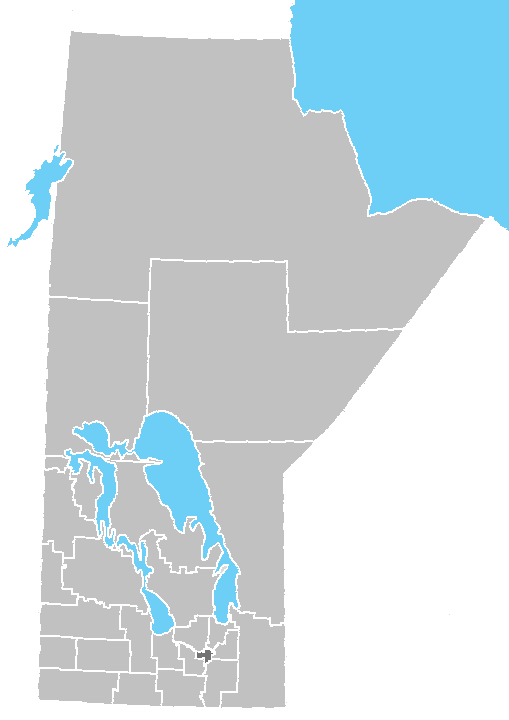

Census Division No. 13 (Selkirk Area) is a census division located within the Interlake Region of the province of Manitoba, Canada. Unlike in some other provinces, census divisions do not reflect the organization of local government in Manitoba. These areas exist solely for the purposes of statistical analysis and presentation; they have no government of their own.

The City of Selkirk, Manitoba is the major service centre for the area. The economy of the division is manufacturing, agriculture and tourism and it is a bedroom community for the City of Winnipeg. The population of the division was 44,829 as of the 2006 census. Also included in the division is the main reserve (Brokenhead 4) of the Brokenhead Ojibway Nation.

== Demographics ==
In the 2021 Census of Population conducted by Statistics Canada, Division No. 13 had a population of 51,643 living in 19,767 of its 22,257 total private dwellings, a change of 5.2% from its 2016 population of 49,086. With a land area of 1,662.28 km^{2} (641.81 sq mi), it had a population density of 31.1/km^{2} (80.5/sq mi) in 2021.

== Cities ==
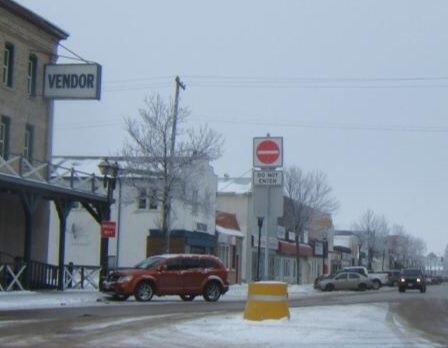
Selkirk

- Selkirk

== Villages ==
- Dunnottar

== Rural municipalities ==
- East St. Paul
- St. Andrews
- St. Clements
- West St. Paul
