= Marchand, Manitoba =

Marchand
- Village
- Location of Marchand in Manitoba
- Coordinates: 49°26′00″N 96°23′00″W
- Country: Canada
- Province: Manitoba
- Time zone: UTC-4
  - Summer (DST): UTC-3

Marchand is a village located in the Rural Municipality of La Broquerie in Manitoba, southeast of Winnipeg and about ten kilometres southeast of the city of La Broquerie. It is a Franco-Manitoban community.

The village of Marchand is the front door to access the Marchand Provincial Park and the Sandilands Provincial Forest.

In 1929, writer Gabrielle Roy got her first teaching position at the local school in Marchand.

The town is home of Canadian Gold Beverages, which produces bottled, carbonated, and flavored water. It also produces a craft soda known as Pic A Pop. It has received multiple honors at the Berkeley Springs International Water Tasting competition for bottled water and carbonated water.

== Notable people ==
- Gabrielle Roy, writer
