= Gambler First Nation =

Gambler First Nation Band No. 294
- People: Ojibwe
- Headquarters: Binscarth, Manitoba

Land
- Main reserve: Gambler 63
- Other reserve(s): Gambler First Nation 63B; Treaty Four Reserve Grounds 77 (shared)

Population (2021)
- On reserve: 58
- On other land: 9
- Off reserve: 267
- Total population: 334

Government
- Chief: David LeDoux

Tribal Council
- West Region Tribal Council

Website
- gamblerfirstnation.ca

Gambler First Nation (GFN, Ojibwe: Ataagewininiing meaning gambling man place) is an Ojibway First Nations community in Manitoba. With a population of 334 members, it is one of the smallest indigenous communities in Manitoba.

Its main reserve, Gambler 63, is located at Binscarth, Manitoba, Canada.

== Reserve lands ==
The band has two reserve:

- Gambler 63 (50°35′55″N 101°22′49″W) — main reserve of the First Nation; it has a total size of 420.10 ha (1,038.1 acres) and is located 128 km northwest of Brandon, Manitoba.
- Gambler First Nation 63B (49°52′47″N 99°57′35″W) — has a total size of 3.1 ha (7.7 acres)
- Treaty Four Reserve Grounds 77 — this reserve is shared with 23 other band governments; it has a total size of 99.20 ha (245.1 acres) and is adjacent to and west of Fort Qu'Appelle.
