= Division No. 14, Manitoba =

Census division in Manitoba, Canada

Coordinates: 50°11′47″N 97°33′45″W

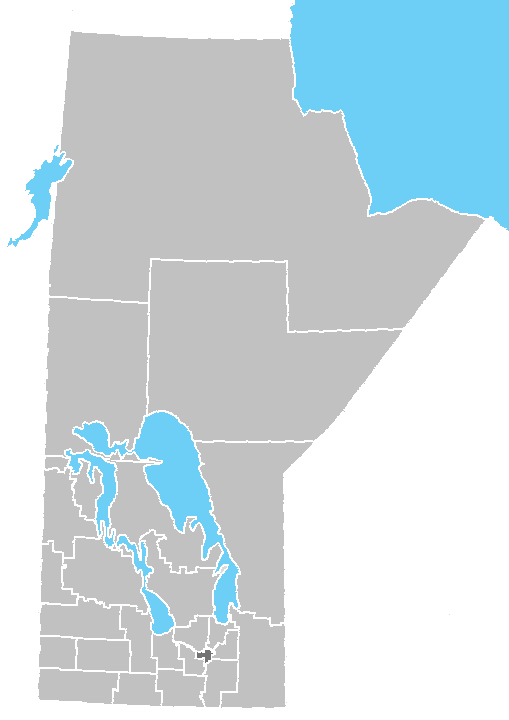

Census Division No. 14 (South Interlake) is a census division located within the Interlake Region of the province of Manitoba, Canada. Unlike in some other provinces, census divisions do not reflect the organization of local government in Manitoba. These areas exist solely for the purposes of statistical analysis and presentation; they have no government of their own.

The district is served by the retail service centres of Stonewall and Teulon. The economy of the area is based on agriculture, livestock and poultry. The population of the division was 18,118 as of the 2006 census.

== Demographics ==
In the 2021 Census of Population conducted by Statistics Canada, Division No. 14 had a population of 19,749 living in 7,142 of its 7,573 total private dwellings, a change of 6.1% from its 2016 population of 18,621. With a land area of 2,833.41 km^{2} (1,093.99 sq mi), it had a population density of 7.0/km^{2} (18.1/sq mi) in 2021.

== Towns ==
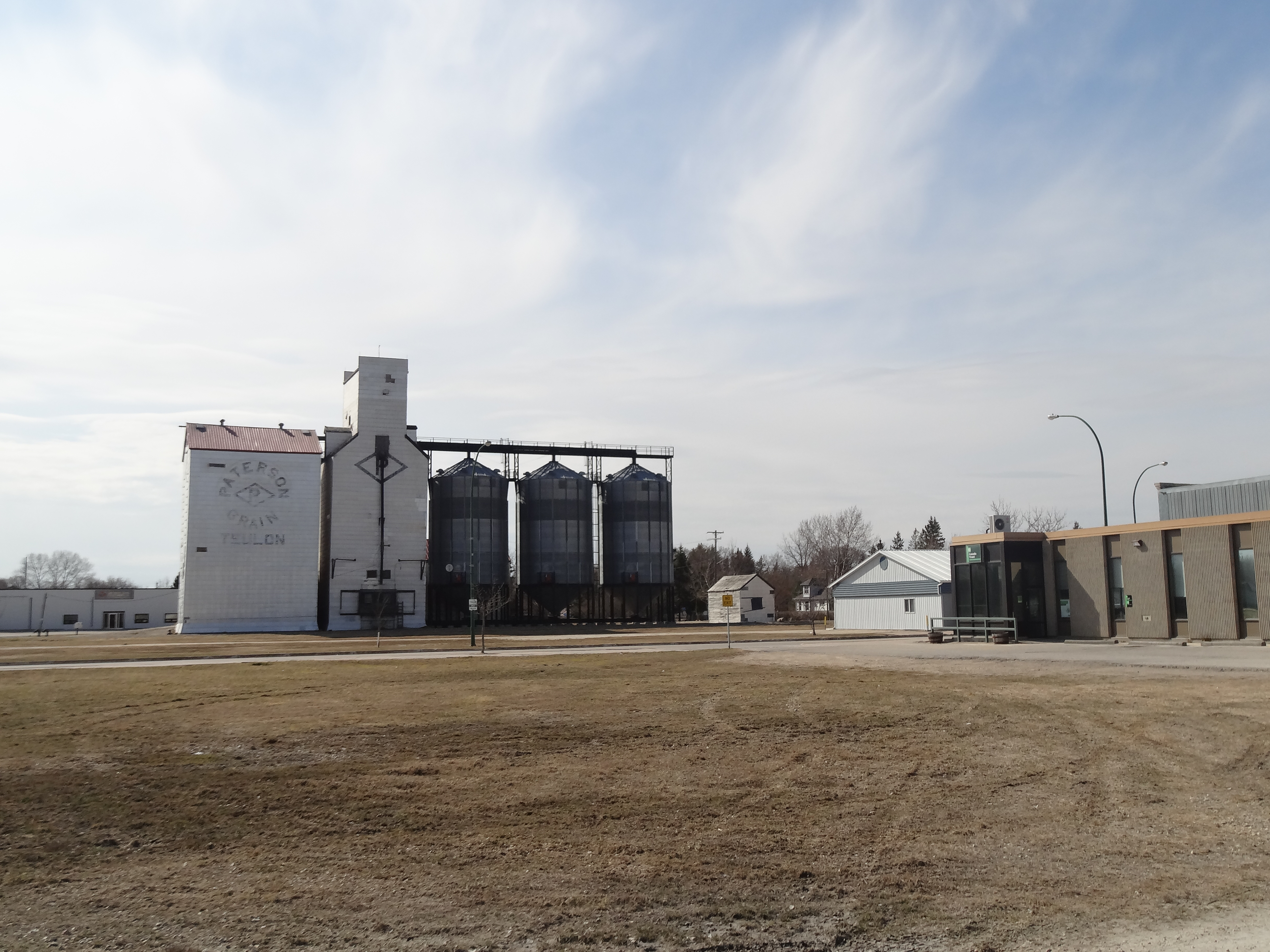
Grain elevators in Teulon

- Stonewall
- Teulon

== Rural municipalities ==
- Rockwood
- Rosser
- Woodlands
