= List of census divisions of Manitoba =

Coordinates: 55°4′N 97°31′W

Statistics Canada divides the province of Manitoba into 23 census divisions. Unlike in some other provinces, census divisions do not reflect the organization of local government in Manitoba. These areas exist solely for the purposes of statistical analysis and presentation; they have no government of their own.

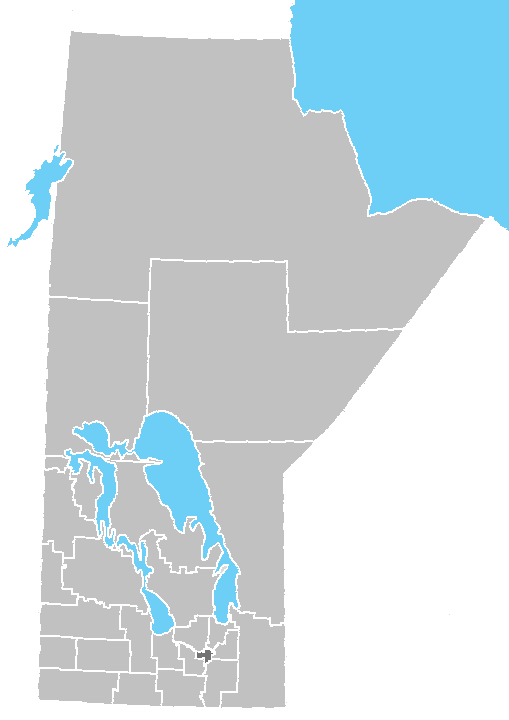

Division No.	Region	Largest City	Population (2021 census)
1.	Eastman Region	Pinawa	20,114
2.	Eastman Region	Steinbach	83,878
3.	Pembina Valley Region	Winkler	57,363
4.	Pembina Valley Region	Manitou	9,665
5.	Westman Region	Killarney	13,326
6.	Westman Region	Virden	9,906
7.	Westman Region	Brandon	70,896
8.	Central Plains Region	Treherne	13,877
9.	Central Plains Region	Portage la Prairie	24,339
10.	Central Plains Region	Elie	12,913
11.	Winnipeg Capital Region	Winnipeg	753,938
12.	Eastman Region	Oakbank	24,863
13.	Interlake Region	Selkirk	51,643
14.	Interlake Region	Stonewall	19,749
15.	Westman Region	Neepawa	23,304
16.	Parkland Region	Roblin	9,945
17.	Parkland Region	Dauphin	21,996
18.	Interlake Region	Gimli	26,636
19.	Northern Region	Peguis	15,381
20.	Parkland Region	Swan River	9,634
21.	Northern Region	The Pas	21,871
22.	Northern Region	Thompson	42,226
23.	Northern Region	Gillam	4,690

== See also ==
- Administrative divisions of Canada
- List of communities in Manitoba
- List of municipalities in Manitoba
- List of regions of Manitoba
