= Rural Municipality of La Broquerie =

Rural municipality in Manitoba, Canada

Rural Municipality of La Broquerie Municipalité rurale de La Broquerie
- Rural municipality
- Location of the RM of La Broquerie in Manitoba
- Coordinates: 49°23′58″N 96°30′37″W
- Country: Canada
- Province: Manitoba
- Region: Eastman

Government
  - MP (Provencher): Ted Falk (CPC)
  - MLA (La Verendrye): Konrad Narth (PC)
  - Reeve: Ivan Normandeau

Area
  - Total: 578.97 km^{2} (223.54 sq mi)
  - Water: 9.0 km^{2} (3.5 sq mi)
- Elevation: 268 m (879 ft)

Population (2021 Census)
  - Total: 6,725
- Time zone: UTC-6 (CST)
  - Summer (DST): UTC-5 (CDT)
- Website: http://www.labroquerie.com/

La Broquerie (French: Municipalité rurale de La Broquerie) is a rural municipality in the province of southern Manitoba, located just southeast of the city of Steinbach.

The municipality includes the local urban district of La Broquerie to the north, and the unincorporated communities of Marchand to the east and Zhoda to the south form the urban centres of the municipality. Besides these areas, the municipality mainly consists of agricultural production and rural residential developments in the northern half to hog production facilities and vastly undeveloped areas in the south.

== History ==
The Rural Municipality of La Broquerie was incorporated on May 25, 1881.

The local urban district of La Broquerie was first named Carleton before Member of Parliament A.A.C. Larivière had it changed to honour Joseph de La Broquerie Taché (1759-1830), who played an important role in the life of his nephew Archbishop Alexandre-Antonin Taché of St. Boniface.

Taché designed the municipal seal, including the inscription "All from above."

On November 15, 1883, Taché declared La Broquerie as "St. Joachim’s mission," and a new St-Joachim Catholic Parish was built in 1884.

Having a large Francophone population, La Broquerie has been celebrating Saint-Jean-Baptiste Day since 1897.

== Geography ==
According to Statistics Canada, the rural municipality has an area of 578.20 km² (223.24 sq mi). There are no separately incorporated cities, towns or villages within the municipality. Provincial Highways #12 and #52 run through the southwest and north portions of the municipality respectively. Provincial Roads #301 and #302, both gravel highways, bisect the municipality. The municipality is located in the plant hardiness zone of 3a/3b. The municipality straddles the Aspen parkland, the traditional tallgrass prairie and the Manitoba lowlands regions.

The community sits close to the Sandilands Provincial Forest, which includes the Marchand Provincial Park. The Seine River runs through the community as well.

=== Communities ===
- La Broquerie
- Marchand
- Zhoda

== Demographics ==
Population Growth
Year	Pop.	±%
1891	330	—
1896	1,532	+364.2%
1901	583	−61.9%
1911	1,191	+104.3%
1921	1,289	+8.2%
1931	1,644	+27.5%
1941	1,888	+14.8%
1951	1,608	−14.8%
1956	1,570	−2.4%
1961	1,454	−7.4%
1966	1,340	−7.8%
1971	1,328	−0.9%
1976	1,523	+14.7%
1981	1,638	+7.6%
1986	1,774	+8.3%
1991	2,038	+14.9%
1996	2,493	+22.3%
2001	2,894	+16.1%
2006	3,659	+26.4%
2011	5,198	+42.1%
2016	6,076	+16.9%
2021	6,725	+10.7%

As of the 2021 Census, La Broquerie has a population of 6,725, an increase of 10.7% from its 2016 population of 6,076. This population occupies 2,044 of the community's 2,177 total private dwellings. With a land area of 578.97 km^{2} (223.54 sq mi), it has a population density of 11.6/km^{2} (30.1/sq mi).

The fast-growing community consists of a wide range of cultural backgrounds including English, French and Mennonite. The 2021 Census reported a population of 6,725 persons, with a median age of 28.6.

Panethnic groups in the Rural Municipality of La Broquerie (2001−2021)
Panethnic group	2021		2016		2011		2006		2001	
Panethnic group	Pop.	%	Pop.	%	Pop.	%	Pop.	%	Pop.	%
European (Note: Statistic includes all persons that did not make up part of a visible minority or an indigenous identity.)	5,430	80.74%	5,085	83.7%	4,310	82.96%	3,295	90.15%	2,565	89.06%
Indigenous	1,185	17.62%	920	15.14%	850	16.36%	355	9.71%	310	10.76%
Southeast Asian (Note: Statistic includes total responses of "Filipino" and "Southeast Asian" under visible minority section on census.)	65	0.97%	60	0.99%	0	0%	0	0%	0	0%
South Asian	20	0.3%	0	0%	0	0%	10	0.27%	0	0%
Latin American	15	0.22%	0	0%	40	0.77%	0	0%	0	0%
African	10	0.15%	0	0%	0	0%	10	0.27%	0	0%
East Asian (Note: Statistic includes total responses of "Chinese", "Korean", and "Japanese" under visible minority section on census.)	0	0%	15	0.25%	0	0%	0	0%	0	0%
Middle Eastern (Note: Statistic includes total responses of "West Asian" and "Arab" under visible minority section on census.)	0	0%	0	0%	0	0%	0	0%	0	0%
Other/multiracial (Note: Statistic includes total responses of "Visible minority, n.i.e." and "Multiple visible minorities" under visible minority section on census.)	0	0%	0	0%	0	0%	0	0%	10	0.35%
Total responses	6,725	100%	6,075	99.98%	5,195	99.94%	3,655	99.89%	2,880	99.52%
Total population	6,725	100%	6,076	100%	5,198	100%	3,659	100%	2,894	100%
Note: Totals greater than 100% due to multiple origin responses

== Notable people ==
- Konrad Narth, MLA from Zhoda
- Théophile Paré, secretary-treasurer for the RM of La Broquerie
- Mélanie Rocan, painter from La Broquerie
- Gabrielle Roy, writer who taught in Marchand
- Daniel Tetrault, hockey player from La Broquerie
- Albert Vielfaure, politician from La Broquerie

== See also ==
- List of francophone communities in Manitoba
