= Regional health authorities in Manitoba =

Regional health authorities (RHAs) are Manitoba's independent governing bodies for healthcare delivery and regulation. RHAs are overseen by their respective boards, who have responsibility for the mandate, resources, and performance of the health authority, responding directly to the provincial Minister of Health.

RHAs work under The Regional Health Authorities Act. The five RHAs that exist today were created as an amalgamation of eleven Health Authorities that were merged in 2012:

- Interlake-Eastern Regional Health Authority
- Northern Health Region
- Prairie Mountain Health
- Southern Health-Santé Sud
- Winnipeg Regional Health Authority

In addition to the five regional health authorities, the three other independent health delivery organizations of Manitoba Health, CancerCare Manitoba (CCMB), and Addictions Foundation of Manitoba (AFM).

Until 2016, RHAs operated under the umbrella of the Regional Health Authorities of Manitoba, Inc. (RHAM), a non-profit corporation intended to facilitate interregional healthcare delivery in the province, pursuing joint activities of mutual benefit to the provincial RHAs. In 2019, Health Minister Cameron Friesen announced amendments to the Regional Health Authorities Act, which added Shared Health as a provincial health authority to take on similar responsibilities to the previous RHAM over province-wide healthcare coordination. Shared Health now leads province-wide responsibilities in areas such as clinical and preventive services planning, digital health, infrastructure, and health human resources planning.

Diagnostic Services Manitoba (DSM), once an independent provincial agency, was fully integrated into Shared Health in 2019. Shared Health now manages all diagnostic services across Manitoba, including laboratories and imaging.

== History ==
Regional health authorities were created in 1997 to "better manage health care services" in Manitoba. In 1998, Regional Health Authorities of Manitoba, Inc. (RHAM) was established under the Corporations Act as a non-profit corporation created after the province's Regional Health Authorities discovered a need for a legal umbrella organization under which they could coordinate certain activities on a provincial basis.

In 2012, the eleven Health Authorities were merged by the Government of Manitoba to create the five larger RHAs that exist today.

In 2016, the RHAM Board of Directors and Membership voted in favour of a motion to dissolve RHAM and start distributing assets and discharging liabilities, effective 1 April 2017.

In 2019, under the Government of Premier Brian Pallister, Health Minister Cameron Friesen announced amendments to the Regional Health Authorities Act. Among these amendments, the provincial government planned to make Shared Health a new provincial health authority, and to change the legislation's name to the Health System Governance and Accountability Act. The amendments would also designate CancerCare Manitoba as the province's authority on cancer with legislative authority.

== Governance and organizations ==
=== Board of directors ===
Each Regional Health Authority is overseen by a board of directors, which has responsibility for its mandate, resources, and performance, responding directly to the provincial Minister of Health. (The Minister also appoints the members.) Members of these boards are required to represent their region as a whole, rather than particular communities or interests.

The boards are responsible for ensuring that their health authority complies with relevant legislation, regulations, provincial policies, and Ministerial directives. Boards have a strategic role in setting direction for the health authority and a fiduciary role in policy formulation, decision-making, and oversight.

The Winnipeg Regional Health Authority has 15 board members, while the rest of the health authorities—which are in the rural and northern regions of Manitoba—have 12 each. Board members were last appointed on 29 March 2020, by Health, Seniors and Active Living Minister Cameron Friesen.

=== Regions ===
While there were initially eleven Health Authorities, the Government of Manitoba merged these RHAs in 2012 to create the five larger RHAs that exist today.

Authority	Region			Merged RHAs
Authority	Head office	Communities	Area	
Interlake-Eastern RHA	Selkirk	Arborg, Ashern, Beausejour, Fisher Branch, Pinawa, Gimli, Lac du Bonnet, Lundar, Oakbank, Pine Falls, Riverton, Selkirk, Stonewall, Whitemouth	61,000 km^{2} (24,000 sq mi)	Interlake RHA; North Eastman RHA
Northern RHA	Flin Flon	2 cities (Flin Flon, Thompson), 6 towns (The Pas, Gillam, Grand Rapids, Leaf Rapids, Lynn Lake, Snow Lake), 1 rural municipality (Kelsey), 1 LGD (Mystery Lake), 26 First Nations communities, 16 Northern Affairs communities (including Norway House)	396,000 km^{2} (153,000 sq mi)	Burntwood RHA; NOR-MAN RHA
Prairie Mountain RHA	Souris	17 First Nation communities; Rural Municipalities of Boissevain – Morton, Cornwallis, Dauphin, Elton, McCreary, Yellowhead and Whitehead; various other communities, including: Baldur, Benito, Binscarth, Birtle, Bowsman, Brandon, Carberry, Cartwright, Dauphin, Deloraine, Elkhorn, Erickson, Ethelbert, Gilbert Plains, Glenboro, Grandview, Hamiota, Hartney, Killarney, Melita, Minitonas, Minnedosa, Neepawa, Reston, Rivers, Roblin, Rossburn, Russell, Sandy Lake, Shoal Lake, Souris, Ste. Rose du Lac, Strathclair, Swan River, Treherne, Virden, Wawanesa, Winnipegosis	67,000 km^{2} (26,000 sq mi)	Assiniboine RHA; Brandon RHA; Parkland RHA
Southern Health-Santé Sud	Southport	7 First Nation communities; 7 municipalities; 1 unorganized territory; 20 rural municipalities (including Emerson – Franklin, Morris, Pembina, Piney, Ste. Anne); 4 cities (Morden, Portage la Prairie, Steinbach, Winkler); 4 towns (incl. Carman, Altona); 1 village (St-Pierre-Jolys); 1 provincial park (Whiteshell)	~27,025 km^{2} (10,434 sq mi)	Central RHA; South Eastman RHA
Winnipeg RHA	Main Street, Winnipeg	1 city (Winnipeg); 1 town (Churchill*); 2 rural municipalities (East St. Paul, West St. Paul)	over 648 km^{2} (250 sq mi)	Churchill RHA

* Note: While the town of Churchill is located in northern Manitoba, it is nonetheless administered by the WRHA.

=== Shared Health ===
Shared Health (French: Soins Communs) is a centralized administrative organization that coordinates the delivery of healthcare services across the province of Manitoba—with initiatives that include planning for Health human resources, investing in capital equipment, and construction planning, among others. Developing clinical and preventive services, Shared Health works collaboratively with the Regional Health Authorities, as well as service-delivery organizations and communities.

The organization was established as a legal entity in 2018 to provide "centralized clinical and business services for the regional health authorities." It has been a central focus of reform of the healthcare system under the government of Premier Brian Pallister. In 2019, Health Minister Cameron Friesen announced amendments to the Regional Health Authorities Act that would give Shared Health legislative power and make it a new provincial health authority. Through this legislation, Shared Health would adopt: the operations of the Health Sciences Centre and certain mental health programs, which are currently overseen by the Winnipeg Regional Health Authority; and Selkirk Mental Health Centre and the Addictions Foundation of Manitoba, which are facilitated by Manitoba Health.

As of February 2025, executives of Shared Health include: Dr. Chris Christodoulou, Interim CEO; Monika Warren, Chief Nursing Officer; and Perry Poulsen, Digital Health and Chief Information Officer.

== See also ==
Health ministries and regions in western Canada

- Alberta Ministry of Health
  - Alberta Health Services
  - Calgary Health Region
  - Capital Health
  - Chinook Health
  - David Thompson Regional Health Authority
  - Palliser Health Region
  - Peace Country Health Region
- BC Ministry of Health
  - First Nations Health Authority
  - Fraser Health
  - Interior Health
  - Island Health
  - Northern Health
  - Provincial Health Services Authority
  - Vancouver Coastal Health
- Saskatchewan Ministry of Health
  - Saskatchewan Health Authority
