= Prairie Mountain Health =

Healthcare regulator in Manitoba, Canada

Coordinates: 49.6205°N 100.2683°W

- Santé Prairie Mountain

Health authority overview
- Formed: 2012
- Type: Regional health authority
- Jurisdiction: Southwestern Manitoba
- Headquarters: Souris, Manitoba
- Employees: 7,846 (2019)
- Annual budget: $558 m CAD (2019/20)
- Health authority executives: Treena Slate, CEO; Lon Cullen, Board chair
- Key document: Regional Health Authorities Act

The Prairie Mountain Health (PMH; French: Santé Prairie Mountain; formerly Western Regional Health Authority) is the governing body responsible for healthcare delivery and regulation for the eponymous health region in southwest Manitoba.

PMH is one of five regional health authorities (RHAs) in Manitoba, and was formed in June 2012 by amalgamating the former regional health authorities of Brandon, Assiniboine, and Parkland. As of July 2019, PMH has approximately 7,846 employees.

Covering a geographical area of about 67,000 square kilometres (26,000 sq mi), the region is made up of 55 municipalities (including the cities of Brandon and Dauphin), 14 First Nation communities, 15 Northern Affairs community councils, and 32 Hutterite communities. As of 2018, the population of the region was 170,899 (~12.9% of Manitoba's population). The region includes 20 acute care (hospital) sites, 43 long-term care (personal care home) sites, and 9 transitional care sites; as well as 6 primary healthcare centres, 1 primary care centre (Swan River), 1 orthopedic rehabilitation centre (Rivers), and 38 EMS ambulance facilities.

During the 2019/20 fiscal year, PMH was the largest user of Manitoba telehealth in the province.

== Locations and communities ==
The Region is made up of 55 municipalities, 14 First Nation communities, 15 Northern Affairs community councils, and 32 Hutterite communities. There are also 2 designated Francophone communities: St. Lazare in the Asessippi area and Ste. Rose in the Agassiz Mountain area, as well as a significant French-speaking community on and around the Canadian Forces Base Shilo.

Location	Hospitals/health centre	Other health facilities	Municipality
Brandon	Brandon Regional Health Centre	Centre for Adult Psychiatry; Centre for Geriatric Psychiatry; Child & Adolescent Treatment Centre; Sexuality Education Resource Centre MB; Western Manitoba Cancer Centre	N/A
Boissevain	Boissevain Health Centre		Boissevain – Morton
Carberry	Carberry Plains District Health Centre		North Cypress – Langford
Cartwright	Davidson Memorial Health Centre		Cartwright – Roblin
Dauphin	Dauphin General Hospital; Dauphin Regional Health Centre	Parkland Regional Mental Health Centre	N/A
Deloraine	Deloraine Health Centre		Deloraine – Winchester
Erickson	Erickson Health Centre		N/A
Gilbert Plains	Gilbert Plains Health Centre		Gilbert Plains
Glenboro	Glenboro Health District		Glenboro – South Cypress
Grandview	Grandview District Health Centre		Grandview
Hamiota	Hamiota District Health Centre		Hamiota
Killarney	Tri-Lake Health District		Killarney-Turtle Mountain
McCreary	McCreary Alonsa Health Centre		McCreary
Melita	Melita Health Centre		Two Borders
Minnedosa	Minnedosa Health District		Minto-Odanah
Neepawa	Neepawa Health Centre		N/A
Reston	Reston District Health Centre		Pipestone
Rivers	Rivers Health Centre		Riverdale
Roblin	Roblin District Health Centre		Roblin
Rossburn	Rossburn District Health Centre		Rossburn
Russell	Russell Health Centre		Russell – Binscarth
Souris	Souris Health Centre		Souris – Glenwood
Sainte Rose du Lac	Ste. Rose General Hospital		Ste. Rose
Shoal Lake	Strathclair Health Centre		Yellowhead
Swan River	Swan River Valley Hospital		N/A
Treherne	Tiger Hills Health Centre		Norfolk Treherne
Virden	Virden Health Centre		N/A
Wawanesa	Wawanesa Health Centre		Oakland – Wawanesa
Winnipegosis	Winnipegosis District Health Centre		Mossey River

=== Indigenous communities ===
The geographical area of PMH includes 14 First Nation communities:

- Treaty 2 — Ebb and Flow, Keeseekoowenin, O-Chi-Chak-O-Sipi, and Skownan
- Treaty 4 — Gambler First Nation, Pine Creek, Rolling River, Sapotaweyak Cree Nation, Tootinaowaziibeeng, Waywayseecappo, and Wuskwi Sipihk
- Dakota First Nation (no Numbered Treaties) — Birdtail, Sioux Valley, and Canupawakpa

The Manitoba Métis Federation (MMF) is represented by 7 regions in Manitoba, with the MMF-Southwest and MMF-Northwest regions being within the boundaries of PMH, as well as a small pocket of several northern Métis Locals/communities.

=== Brandon Regional Health Centre ===
The Brandon Regional Health Centre (BRHC) is the largest facility within the Prairie Mountain Health region and a central health-care hub for western Manitoba.

In 2016, the BRHC began a $16.8-million renovation project, with $15.8m funded by the Government of Manitoba and the remaining $1.1m coming from the PMH and a campaign by the BRHC Foundation. The project was officially completed in the 2019/20 fiscal year.

== Former health authorities ==
Prairie Mountain Health was formed in June 2012 by amalgamating the former Brandon, Assiniboine, and Parkland Regional Health Authorities.

=== Assiniboine Regional Health Authority ===
Assiniboine Regional Health Authority
- Formation: 1998
- Dissolved: 2012
- Headquarters: Souris, Manitoba (Corporate Office); Shoal Lake, Manitoba (Regional Office)
- Official language: English, French
- Chief executive officer: Penny Gilson
- Budget: $100,000,000
- Staff: 3,000
- Website: Archived home page

The Assiniboine Regional Health Authority (ARHA) was the health-care service provider for the Assiniboine Region in southwestern Manitoba until it merged into Prairie Mountain Health in 2012.

The population of the ARHA before the merge was estimated at 71,500. Covering an area of 32,134 square kilometres (12,407 sq mi), the region began from the northwestern point in the Rural Municipality of Shellmouth-Boulton near the community of Russell, continuing down the Manitoba/Saskatchewan border until meeting the USA border, and extending south-east to the Rural Municipality of South Norfolk near Treherne, and north to the Rural Municipality of Glenella in the Neepawa area.

ARHA provided health services in the following communities: Baldur, Birtle, Boissevain, Carberry, Rivers, Cartwright, Deloraine, Elkhorn, Erickson, Glenboro, Hamiota, Hartney, Killarney, Melita, Minnedosa, Neepawa, Reston, Russell, Sandy Lake, Shoal Lake, Souris, Strathclair, Treherne, Virden, and Wawanesa. It also included Riding Mountain National Park.

ARHA operated 20 acute care facilities, 1 transitional care unit, 28 long-term care facilities, and 7 elderly persons housing units. The ARHA provided public health, mental health, diagnostic, emergency medical, and home care services, with 64 physicians providing medical services in the area.

==== ARHA governance ====
The BHRA was run by a 14-member board of directors. The Minister of Health appointed directors for a 3-year term. In August 2011, the ARHA directors were:

- Dean Dietrich (based in Neepawa) – Chairperson
- Debbie Eastcott (Shoal Lake)
- Randy Hodge (Killarney)
- Kristine Janz (Baldur)
- Jacqueline Leforte (Goodlands)
- Marg MacDonald (Brandon)
- Kelvin Nerbas (Shellmouth)
- Eva Whitebird (Rolling River First Nation)
- Leona Williams (Deloraine)
- Laura McDougald-Williams (Brandon)
- Reginald Buss
- Isobel Jarema (Neepawa)
- Terry Johnson (Virden)
- Pat Phillips

=== Brandon Regional Health Authority ===
Brandon Regional Health Authority
- Formation: 1998
- Dissolved: 2012
- Headquarters: 150A - 7th St., Brandon, Manitoba
- Official language: English
- Chief executive officer: Brian Schoonbaert
- Board of directors: Marg MacDonald (board chair)
- Staff: 2,500
- Website: Archived home page

The Brandon Regional Health Authority (BRHA) was the governing body for healthcare services in and around the City of Brandon, Manitoba.

In addition to Brandon, the BRHA service area included the Rural Municipalities of Cornwallis, Elton, and Whitehead, as well as being a regional referral centre for Manitoba's Westman area. Based on the 2001 Statistics Canada census, the BRHA served a population of 47,652.

In 2005, the BRHA was criticized for a lack of medical specialists and slow recruitment for departing physicians.

==== BHRA governance ====
As of September 2011, the BRHA board members were:

- Marg MacDonald – Chairperson
- Alison McNeill-Hordern – Vice Chair
- Rita Blaikie
- Charles Cuerrier
- Barry French – ARHA Rep.
- Karen Doty-Sweetnam
- Jo-Anne Douglas
- D.J. Scotty McIntosh
- Terry Parlow
- Al Patterson
- Perry Roque
- Barbara Anne Smith
- Anne Todd
- Roland Vodon

=== Parkland Regional Health Authority ===
Parkland Regional Health Authority
- Formation: 1998
- Dissolved: 2012
- Headquarters: 625 - 3rd Street S.W., Dauphin, Manitoba
- Board of directors: Mary Hudyma (board chair)
- Website: Archived home page

The Parkland Regional Health Authority (PRHA) was the governing body responsible for the planning, coordination, funding, and delivery of all health services within the Parkland Region of west-central Manitoba.

Serving a population of around 42,000, the PRHA had 7 hospitals, 11 personal care homes, and 6 Manitoba telehealth sites.

Covering an area of approximately 34,000 square kilometres (13,000 sq mi), the region was bound on the west by the Manitoba/Saskatchewan border, on the north by the 53rd parallel, on the south by Riding Mountain National Park, and on the east by Lake Manitoba and Lake Winnipegosis. The region covered the city of Dauphin; the town of Swan River; the Rural Municipalities of Alonsa (Alonsa, Bacon Ridge, Pine River) and Mountain (Birch River, Mafeking); and communities such as Benito, Camperville, Crane River, Duck Bay, Ethelbert, Gilbert Plains, Grandview, McCreary, Minitonas, Pelican Rapids, Roblin, Rorketon, Ste. Rose du Lac, Waterhen, and Winnipegosis.

==== PRHA governance ====
The Parkland RHA's Board of Directors would have up to 15 members including the chairperson, with one vacancy and an option for one additional appointment by the Minister of Health. From April 2011 to March 31, 2012, PRHA's Board of Directors was:

- Mary Hudyma (based in Dauphin) – Chairperson
- Rowena Powell (Roblin) – Vice‐Chair
- Sharon Basaraba (Gilbert Plains)
- Monica Black (Bowsman)
- Patricia Delaurier (Ste. Rose)
- Alex Grimaldi (Dauphin)
- Robert Hanson (Mafeking)
- Anne Lacquette (Mallard)
- Andy Maxwell (Swan River)
- Charles "Chuck" Morden (McCreary)
- Paul Overgaard (Dauphin)
- Gerald Shewchuk (Dauphin)
- Harry Showdra (Swan River)
- John Tichon (Fork River)

== YouTube video lawsuit ==
On April 12, 2022, Prairie Mountain Health and ten of its employees filed a lawsuit in Winnipeg against a former employee, a psychiatric nurse who worked at the Brandon Regional Health Centre, based upon four videos she had uploaded to YouTube which Prairie Mountain Health alleged to be defamatory. The videos were said to contain disparaging statements about the employees as well the nurse's claims that she had been bullied in the workplace. Prairie Mountain Health sought an injunction forcing the nurse to remove the videos and prevent her from creating more of them.

== See also ==
- Regional Health Authorities of Manitoba
  - Interlake-Eastern Regional Health Authority
  - Northern Regional Health Authority
  - Southern Regional Health Authority
  - Winnipeg Regional Health Authority
