= Economy of Lethbridge =

The economy of Lethbridge is central to the commercial, distribution, financial and industrial sectors of the southern Alberta economy (although Medicine Hat plays a significant role in southeastern Alberta). Lethbridge has a trading area population of 250,000 (including parts of British Columbia and Montana). The city was founded in 1885 as a result of local coal mining and later was buoyed by local farming and ranching. Toward the end of the twentieth century, the local economy started diversifying by focusing more on service-based industries.

== Economic development ==
In 2004, the municipal government organised Economic Development Lethbridge, a body responsible for the promotion and development of the city's commercial interests. Also in that year, the city joined in a partnership with 24 other local communities to create an economic development alliance called SouthGrow, representing a population of over 140,000.

In 2006, Economic Development Lethbridge partnered with SouthGrow Regional Initiative and Alberta SouthWest Regional Alliance to create the Southern Alberta Alternative Energy Partnership. This partnership is responsible for the development and attraction of alternative energy business, including wind power, solar power and biofuel.

== Head offices ==
Lethbridge has been the home of several national companies over the years. From its founding in 1935, Canadian Freightways was based in Lethbridge until moving its operations to Calgary in 1948; its call centre remains in Lethbridge. Taco Time Canada was based in the city from 1978–1995 before moving to Calgary. Minute Muffler, which began in 1969, is based out of Lethbridge. International shipping company H & R Transport has been based in the city since 1955. Braman Furniture, which also has locations in Manitoba and Ontario, has been headquartered in Lethbridge since 1991. Lethbridge Iron Works has been in the city since 1898.

== Industry sectors ==
Traditionally, Lethbridge's economy has been agriculture based; however, as the city has grown in recent years, its economy has become more diversified. As shown below, half of the city's industry—at least in 2001—was in the health, education, retail and hospitality sectors and the top five employers were government based.

According to the 2001 federal census, Lethbridge industry sectors make up the following shares of the economy:

- Health and education services: 21%
- Wholesale and retail trade: 17%
- Leisure, hospitality and food services: 13%
- Primary and construction: 10%
- Manufacturing: 10%
- Professional and business services: 10%
- Public administration: 5%
- Transportation and warehousing: 5%
- Finance and insurance: 3%
- Other: 6%

=== Government ===
Lethbridge is the headquarters for Lethbridge County, and the City of Lethbridge is the largest municipal government south of Calgary. In addition, several provincial government agencies are located in the city.

=== Health ===
The local health region, Chinook Health, is based in Lethbridge and oversees the operation of 12 hospitals, 15 community health centres, and 5 continuing care facilities in 14 communities. It also employs more people in Lethbridge than any other single organization, including 3,500 staff and 200 physicians.

=== Education ===
Two post-secondary institutions — University of Lethbridge and Lethbridge College — are located here and provide a combined workforce of roughly 3,000 persons. In addition, the Kainai-based Red Crow Community College also has a campus in the city.

=== Retail and hospitality ===
Lethbridge's regional prominence as a service provider has resulted in the establishment of the city as a retail and hospitality centre. Three shopping malls provide 175 retail spaces. Combined with three power centres, they accommodate nearly 30 major national and international retailers. In addition, 16 major hotel/motel facilities exist in Lethbridge and provide a total of over 1,346 rooms, which increase by nearly 1,000 during the summer when the university and college open their dorms for visitor occupancy. The city also has 145 restaurants, 67 fast food outlets, and 63 bars and lounges.

=== Manufacturing ===
Although the manufacturing sector makes up only 10% of the city's total economy, it accounts for more than $1.2 billion in sales annually and has a total payroll of over $185 million for roughly 4,800 employees. The more than 100 firms occupy over 380,902 m² (4.1 million square feet) of floor and office space in six industrial and business parks. Areas of manufacturing include the following:

- Agricultural equipment
- Animal feeds
- Concrete products
- Construction materials
- Fabricated metal
- Foods and beverages
- Furniture
- Machining
- Manufactured housing
- Non-metallic mineral products
- Plastics
- Heating and ventilation products
- Transportation equipment

== Largest employers in Lethbridge ==
In 2017, the largest employers in Lethbridge were as follows:

Employer	Business Activity	Number of Staff
Alberta Health Services	Health Care & Social Assistance	3,368
University of Lethbridge	Educational Services	2,431
Lethbridge School District Number 51	Educational Services	1,500
City of Lethbridge	Public Administration	1,462
Lethbridge Polytechnic	Educational Services	955
Alberta Government	Public Administration	900
Holy Spirit Catholic Schools Division #4	Educational Services	779
Sunrise Poultry	Food Manufacturing	625
Covenant Health	Health Care & Social Assistance	603
Palliser Regional Schools	Educational Services	519
Lethbridge Research and Development Centre	Professional, Scientific & Technical Services	443
Maple Leaf Foods Inc. - Lethbridge Pork	Food Manufacturing	425
PepsiCo Foods Canada	Food Manufacturing	400
McDonalds	Accommodation & Food Services	400
Lethbridge Family Services	Health Care & Social Assistance	375
Green Acres Foundation	Health Care & Social Assistance	341
Sobeys	Retail	338
Triple M Housing	Manufacturing	325
Costco	Retail	285
Save-On Foods	Retail	267
Charlton & Hill	Manufacturing	180
Kawneer	Manufacturing	257
CP Rail	Transportation & Warehousing	250
Real Canadian Superstore	Retail	225
Southern Alberta Community Living Association	Health Care & Social Assistance	222
McCains	Food Manufacturing	217
Shoppers Drug Mart	Retail	212
Davis Auto Group	Retail	211
Canadian Tire	Retail	189
Cavendish Farms	Food Manufacturing	185
Western Tractor	Retail	163
Richardson Oilseed	Food Manufacturing	160
Casino Lethbridge	Arts, Entertainment & Recreation	155
ATB Financial	Finance & Insurance	153
H&R Transport	Transportation & Warehousing	143
Meridian Manufacturing	Manufacturing	142
Pratt & Whitney	Manufacturing	141
SRI Homes	Manufacturing	139
Southland Trailer Corp	Manufacturing	205
Lethbridge Iron Works	Manufacturing	130
Haul-All Equipment	Manufacturing	130
Home Depot	Retail	125
Browns Social House	Accommodation & Food Services	124
MNP	Professional, Scientific & Technical Services	124
RBC	Finance & Insurance	120
KB Heating & Air Conditioning	Construction	109
Varsteel	Manufacturing	105
Lethbridge County	Public Administration	104
Firestore Restaurant & Bar	Accommodation & Food Services	104

== Regional services ==
Lethbridge serves as a hub for commercial activity in the region, which includes several satellite communities. It provides many services and amenities for the region. Much of the region's transport needs are provided by or concentrated in or near the city including convergence of four provincial highways, rail service and an airport. Other than the Red Crow Community College, which has a campus in Lethbridge, the only post-secondary education south of Calgary and west of Medicine Hat is provided by Lethbridge and consists of the University of Lethbridge and Lethbridge College.

The city provides direct services to surrounding communities. In 2004, the police services of Lethbridge and Coaldale combined to form the Lethbridge Regional Police Service, since renamed to the Lethbridge Police Service. The city provides municipal water to the nearby towns of Coaldale and Coalhurst and the hamlets of Diamond City, Iron Springs, Shaughnessy and Turin. The city's Public Safety Communications Centre provides fire and ambulance dispatching services for the Lethbridge County and police dispatch for the Lethbridge Police Service.

Lethbridge provides jobs for up to 80,000 people who commute to the city from a radius of 100 km. It provides numerous processing facilities for nearby agricultural producers and a dozen trucking firms for commercial shipping needs.
