= Brian Sinclair =

Brian Sinclair may refer to:

- Brian Sinclair (footballer)
- Brian Sinclair (veterinary surgeon)
- Death of Brian Sinclair
