= Southern Regional Health Authority =

Manitoba healthcare system

Southern Health-Santé Sud
Health authority overview
- Formed: 2012
- Type: Regional health authority
- Jurisdiction: southern Manitoba
- Headquarters: Southport, Manitoba
- Employees: 4,800
- Annual budget: $ 372.52 m CAD (2020)
- Health authority executives: Adam Monteith, Board Chair; Jane Curtis, CEO
- Key documents: Regional Health Authorities Act; Personal Health Information Act; Mental Health Act
- Website: southernhealth.ca

Southern Health-Santé Sud (SH-SS) is the governing body responsible for healthcare delivery and regulation for the eponymous health region in southern Manitoba—covering southeastern and south-central Manitoba, in particular.

Southern Health-Santé Sud is one of 5 regional health authorities (RHAs) in Manitoba and is a designated bilingual RHA. It was formed in 2012 by the merger of the former South Eastman Health/Santé Sud-Est and Regional Health Authority - Central Manitoba Health Authorities.

Covering an area of more than 27,025 square kilometres (10,434 sq mi), the region stretches from the 49th parallel up to the Trans-Canada Highway, from the Manitoba/Ontario border to Winnipeg, and then follows the southwest edge of Lake Manitoba down to the Pembina Escarpment in the west. The region includes: 20 rural municipalities, 7 municipalities, 4 cities, 4 towns, 1 village, and 1 unorganized territory; as well as 7 First Nation communities, 61 Hutterite colonies, and various other cultures and communities such as Métis, Francophone and Mennonite.

Just as for the other RHAs, the board of directors SH-SS are appointed by the provincial Minister of Health, Seniors and Active Living and in accordance with the Regional Health Authorities Act. SH-SS has 4 regional offices, located in La Broquerie, Morden, Notre Dame de Lourdes, and Southport.

== Communities ==
The region serves 20 rural municipalities, 7 municipalities, 4 cities, 5 towns, 1 village, and 1 unorganized territory; as well as 7 First Nation communities, 61 Hutterite colonies, and various other cultures and communities such as Métis, Francophone and Mennonite.

Southern Health-Santé Sud is a designated bilingual RHA, and 11% of the region's population speak French "well enough to conduct a conversation." In 2019/2020, there were 350 designated bilingual positions in SH-SS (of 602 total) held by bilingual employees.

Southern Health-Santé Sud's region includes the following:

Municipalities / Rural Municipalities (27)

- Alonsa
- De Salaberry
- Dufferin
- Emerson – Franklin
- Grey
- Hanover
- Headingley
- La Broquerie
- Lorne
- Louise
- Macdonald
- Morris
- Montcalm
- North Norfolk
- Pembina
- Piney
- Portage la Prairie
- Rhineland
- Ritchot
- Roland
- Stanley
- St. Francois Xavier
- Ste. Anne
- Stuartburn
- Tache
- Thompson
- WestLake – Gladstone
Cities (4)
- Morden
- Portage la Prairie
- Steinbach
- Winkler

Towns (5)

- Altona
- Carman
- Morris
- Niverville
- Ste. Anne

Villages (1)

- St. Pierre-Jolys

Other

- Whiteshell Provincial Park (south)

=== Indigenous ===
13% of the population identify as Indigenous in Southern Health-Santé Sud—which includes 7 First Nation communities and a significant number of Métis communities. The region's First Nations communities are:

- Buffalo Point First Nation
- Dakota Plains Wahpeton First Nation
- Dakota Tipi First Nation
- Long Plain First Nation
- Roseau River Anishinabe First Nation
- Sandy Bay Ojibway First Nation
- Swan Lake First Nation

In 2016, Southern Health-Santé Sud signed an Indigenous Health Partnership Agreement with Dakota Ojibway Tribal Council, First Nations Inuit Health Branch, Dakota Tipi First Nation, Long Plain First Nation, Roseau River Anishinabe First Nation, Sandy Bay Ojibway First Nation, and Swan Lake First Nation.

== Facilities ==
Southern Health-Santé Sud includes 18 health centres, 18 mental health sites, 15 telehealth sites, 20 EMS sites, 19 home care sites, 22 personal care homes, and 37 clinics.

The three regional health centres (RHCs) of Southern Health-Santé Sud are Bethesda Regional Health Centre, Boundary Trails Health Centre, and Portage District General Hospital. In total, SH-SS has 456 acute care beds, among which 255 belong to the RHCs.

Location (type)	Hospital/health centre	Other health site			Municipality
Location (type)	Hospital/health centre	Mental health	Telehealth	EMS	Municipality
Altona (town)	Altona Community Memorial Health Centre	Yes	Yes	Yes	
Carman (town)	Carman Memorial Hospital	Yes	Yes	Yes	
Crystal City (local urban district)	Rock Lake District Hospital (Note: Affiliate health corporation)	Yes		Yes	Louise
Falcon Lake (unincorporated urban community)				Yes	
Elie (local urban district)				Yes	Cartier
Emerson (local urban district)	Emerson Health Centre				Emerson – Franklin
Gladstone (unincorporated urban community)	Gladstone Health Centre	Yes	Yes	Yes	WestLake – Gladstone
Île-des-Chênes (unincorporated community)				Yes	Ritchot
La Salle (town)					Macdonald
MacGregor (unincorporated community)	MacGregor Health Centre	Yes		Yes	North Norfolk
Manitou (unincorporated urban community)	Pembina Manitou Health Centre	Yes		Yes	Pembina
Morris (town)	Morris General Hospital	Yes		Yes	
Morden (city)		Yes		Yes	
Niverville (town)		Yes		Yes	
Notre Dame de Lourdes (local urban district)	Centre de santé Notre-Dame Health Centre	Yes	Yes	Yes	Lorne
Oak Bluff (incorporated community)				Yes	Macdonald
Portage la Prairie (city)	Portage District General Hospital (Note: Regional health centre)	Yes	Yes	Yes	
Sprague		Yes	Yes		Piney
St. Claude (local urban district)	Centre de santé St. Claude Health Centre		Yes		Grey
St. Jean-Baptiste (local urban district)			Yes		Montcalm
St. Pierre-Jolys (village)	Centre medico-social DeSalaberry District Health Centre	Yes	Yes	Yes	
Swan Lake (unincorporated community)	Lorne Memorial Hospital	Yes	Yes	Yes	Lorne
Ste. Anne (town)	Hôpital Ste. Anne Hospital	Yes	Yes	Yes	
Steinbach (city)	Bethesda Regional Health Centre	Yes		Yes	
Vita (local urban district)	Vita & District Health Centre	Yes	Yes	Yes	Stuartburn
Winkler (city)	Boundary Trails Health Centre; Eden Mental Health Centre	Yes	Yes	Yes	

== Health statistics ==
On 18 March 2020, the Southern Health-Santé Sud region discovered its first cases of COVID-19. Two days later, Southern Health's first regional COVID-19 community testing site was opened in Steinbach. The region's second site opened in Winkler on March 25, and the third in Portage la Prairie on March 27.

As almost 2,000 adults have a diagnosis of chronic kidney disease in the region—and, of those, 180 have end stage kidney disease—Southern Health is projected to experience the highest increase in the province in people living with end stage kidney disease by 2024 and, as such, the highest increase for renal therapies (e.g. hemodialysis, kidney transplants) by 2024. Additionally, the prevalence of diabetes in SH-SS has increased over time, going from 6.3% through 2009/10–2011/12 to 7.3% in 2014/15–2016/17. The region also ranks lowest in Manitoba for several childhood vaccines (Diphtheria, Tetanus, Pertussis, and HPV) among youth aged 17 years who received the recommended doses.

In their 2019/2020 annual report, Southern Health-Santé Sud was found to have a life expectancy among the highest in the province. From 2012 to 2016, the average life expectancy for males was 79.4 years in SH-SS and 78.5 years in Manitoba; for females, it was 83.9 years in SH-SS and 82.8 years in Manitoba.

SH-SS health statistics compared to Manitoba
Health issue	SH-SS	MB	Time period
Diabetes prevalence	7.3%	8.6%	2014/15 – 2016/17
Total respiratory morbidity	7.3%	10.3%	2016 – 2017
Ischemic heart disease	7.1%	8.3%	2012/13 – 2016/17
Arthritis	19%	20.4%	2015/16 – 2016/17
Substance use disorders	4.4%	5.9%	2010/11 – 2014/15
Mood and anxiety disorders	17.7%	23.2%	2010/11 – 2014/15
Preterm births	6.2%	7.6%	2012/13 – 2016/17
Teen pregnancies (per 1000)	30	21.9	2012/13 – 2016/17

== Former regions ==
Southern Health-Santé Sud was formed in 2012 by the merger of two former regional health authorities.

Regional Health Authority - Central Manitoba Inc. (or Central Region) was the health authority for the south-central region of Manitoba, with its regional office located in Southport, Manitoba.

This region covered more than 18,900 square kilometres (7,300 sq mi) of south-central Manitoba, extending from the western edge of the Pembina Valley to the Red River in the east, and from Lake Manitoba in the north to the international border in the south. Serving 37 municipalities and various communities, it was the most populated of Manitoba's rural and northern regions, with 8.5% of the province's total population. In 2010, the region had 14 acute care sites, 15 personal care homes, 13 home care offices, 15 public health units, 11 mental health offices, and 14 ambulance stations.

South Eastman Health/Santé Sud-Est Inc. was the health authority for the southern Eastman region of Manitoba, and was based in La Broquerie.

This region covered over 10,000 square kilometres (3,900 sq mi), spanning south from the Trans Canada Highway to the Canada–United States border, and east of the Red River to the Manitoba–Ontario border. South Eastman owned and operated the region's 4 hospitals, which were located in St. Pierre-Jolys, Ste. Anne, Steinbach, and Vita; it also had two primary health care centres, located in Sprague and Niverville
