= Bethesda Regional Health Centre =

- Southern Regional Health Authority

Geography
- Location: 316 Henry Street, Steinbach, Manitoba, Canada
- Coordinates: 49°31′46″N 96°40′49″W

Organization
- Care system: Public Medicare (Canada)
- Type: General

Services
- Emergency department: Yes
- Beds: 73

History
- Founded: 1963

Links
- Website: Bethesda Hospital
- Lists: Hospitals in Canada

Bethesda Regional Health Centre, formerly Bethesda Hospital, is a hospital in Steinbach, Manitoba, Canada. It is one of seventeen hospitals operated by the Southern Health - Santé Sud Regional Health Authority. Bethesda is the largest hospital in the Eastman region. Bethesda currently has 73 beds to serve the community and area, a new expansion that will add 23 beds began construction in 2023.

== History ==
The first hospital in Steinbach opened in 1929 by Abram Andreas Vogt and his sister Maria and operated under the name of the Vogt Hospital. He and his sister operated the facility which then served as a home for disabled and chronically ill patients and was taken over by a local church in 1945. The current building of the Bethesda Regional Health Centre opened in 1963 as a 63 bed facility and its name was taken from the biblical Pool of Bethesda in Jerusalem where Jesus miraculously healed a paralyzed man.

The hospital underwent a $22 million upgrade to the Emergency Room in 2012. The expansion was necessitated by the rapid population growth in the city of Steinbach and area. A further CA$23 million expansion for the hospital began in 2023 with a westward expansion of the hospital to establish a new six-station renal dialysis unit and adding a further 15 acute care beds as well as eight surgical beds. A short time later, the Government of Manitoba announced another CA$33 million dollar expansion in 2023 to add three modern operating rooms in the hospital and bringing the cost of the expansion to CA$64 million.

== Services ==
=== Emergency room ===
The emergency room at Bethesda Regional Health Centre received approximately 25,000 visits a year as of 2011 and prior to the expansion in 2012.

=== Obstetrics ===
In 2020, 455 births took place at the hospital's obstetrics department.
