= HSC Winnipeg Children's Hospital =

Hospital in Winnipeg, Canada

- Health Sciences Centre
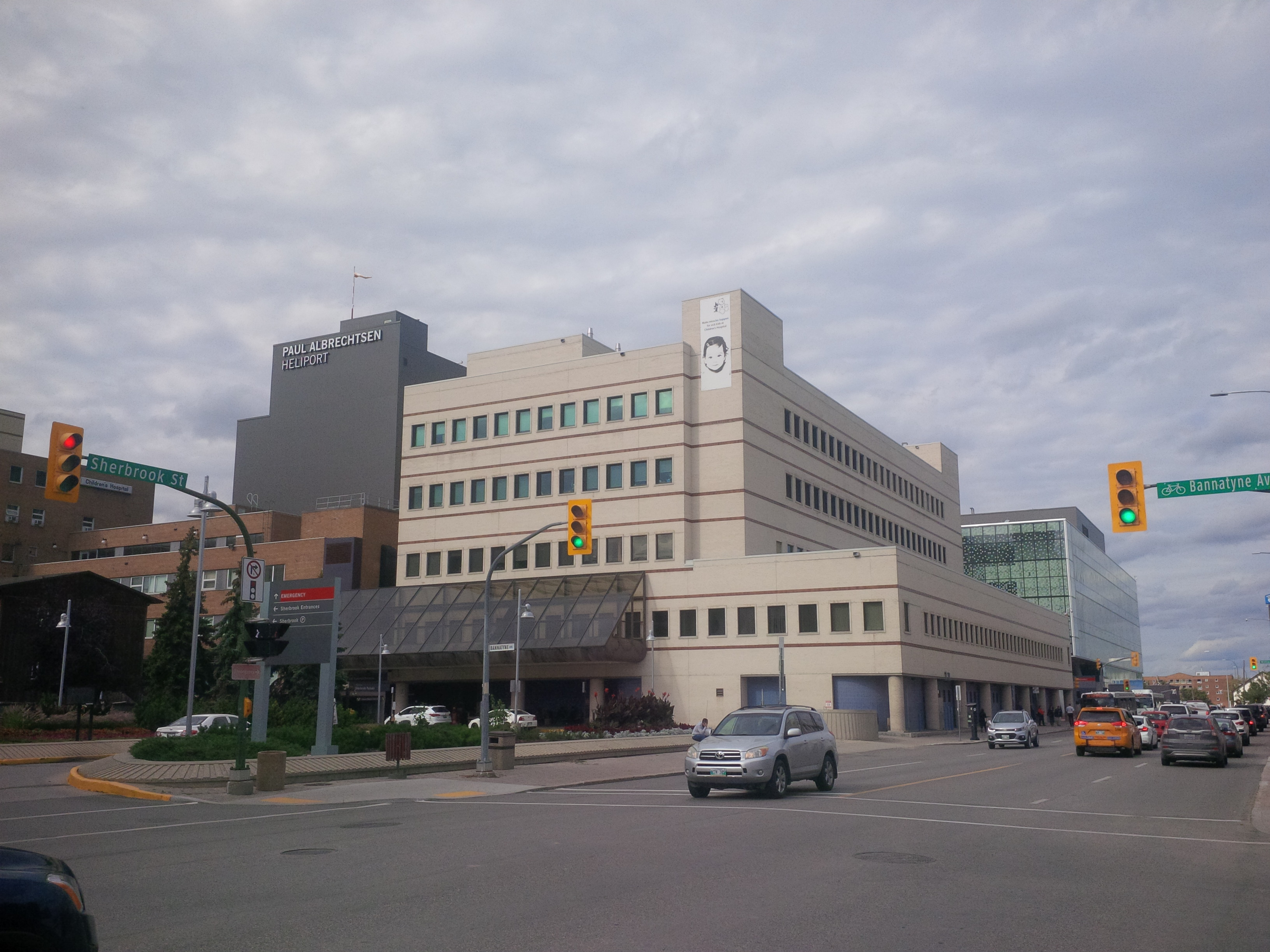
- HSC Winnipeg Children's Hospital seen in 2019

Geography
- Location: 840 Sherbrook Street, Winnipeg, Manitoba, Canada; R3A 1S1 49.9038°N 97.1563°W

Organisation
- Care system: Medicare
- Type: Teaching
- Affiliated university: University of Manitoba

Services
- Emergency department: Yes
- Beds: 127

Helipads
- Helipad: (TC LID: CWH7)

History
- Former name: Children's Hospital of Winnipeg
- Founded: 1909

Links
- Website: hsc.mb.ca/children

HSC Winnipeg Children's Hospital, formerly known as the Children's Hospital of Winnipeg, is a children's hospital that forms part of the Health Sciences Centre integrated health care facility in Winnipeg, Manitoba. The hospital serves patients from Manitoba, Nunavut, and northwestern Ontario.

== History ==
The hospital was founded in 1909 and was staffed by one nurse and volunteer doctors and surgeons.

The first complete hospital building was erected on William Avenue at Sherbrook Street and opened on December 2, 1956. The cost of the project was $3 million. To raise funds, a successful fundraising campaign begun in 1948, headed by prominent businessman John Draper Perrin.

Provisions would be made available for parents or caregivers wanting to stay with their hospitalized children. At the time it was the only fully developed pediatric hospital in Canada, west of Toronto. At the opening, the hospital featured 250 beds, 5 operating rooms, a laboratory, a convalescing room, an X-ray room, patient records room, administration offices, cafeteria. Separate areas for admitting non-emergency patients, emergency patients and out-patients, where previously all types would be admitted in one area. Two electronically controlled passenger and one service elevator.

A used book market began in 1961 to raise funds for the hospital. Used books were gathered early in the spring, to be sold at the market in May at Polo Park Shopping Centre.

At the 55th annual meeting of the Children's Hospital in 1964, chief administrator J. E. Robinson stated that the budget of the hospital had increased by five times that of the 1953 budget from $505,000 (1953) to $2.5 million (1963). In 1953, 91 children (as inpatients) were treated. Ten years later the number had jumped to 191. In 1953 the number of outpatients was 18,000. By 1963, outpatients treated were 29,900. By 1963 there were 508 full-time and 99 part-time employees working at the hospital. Occupancy was 86% of the 323 beds in 1963. The hospital stated that at the rate of inpatient and outpatient growth that at some point a hospital expansion would be required.

The Child Development Clinic opened in the spring of 1964 to serve the needs of developmentally delayed children.

At the annual meeting of the St. Agnes Guild of January 1965, members were asked to keep the hospital general purpose rather than become a hospital specializing in various diseases and conditions, saying that in the metro area there were already two hospitals that served pediatric needs — Children's Hospital and St. Boniface Hospital.

An additional 68 beds opened in early 1967, after a $5 million expansion project together with another 50 would be required by 1972 to keep pace with demand. Said Mr. Robinson at the announcement:

When this hospital was built, it was expected to become a straight community-type treatment institution with a minimum of services to take care of the run-of-the-mill conditions that have to be treated in the community.

We weren't going to be a research institution and there weren't going to be teaching of internes. [sic]

X-ray facilities, laboratories, emergency space, out-patients' department and special therapy provisions had been kept at an absolute minimum.

The 1967 addition added another four operating rooms and alterations and expansion of the existing five rooms, a new psychiatric unit, an improved poison centre to accommodate patients not ill enough to require an overnight stay, a new physiotherapy and occupational therapy space, administrative space for the home care program, new lab space for the respiratory and cystic fibrosis research and treatment centre, open heart diagnostic space, teaching space for interns. A central air conditioning system was installed at a cost of $600,000.

Part of the hospital is the Intensive Care Newborn Nursery where newborns that require surgery shortly after birth and also to care for premature infants. The nursery had a maximum capacity of 12 in the late-1960s with an additional four spaces in 1968. Although more common now, the newborn nursery served a wide area in the region, including the prairie provinces, northwest Ontario, the Northwest Territories, as well as some midwest states. In the late 1960s, 40 per cent of babies in the intensive care newborn nursery came from outside the Greater Winnipeg area.

In 1969 the Children's Hospital School of Nursing, the only one of its kind in western Canada, closed. The school had begun in 1909 just as the original hospital came into being and described as "based on the care of the well child and prevention of disease, progressed to care of the child during illness, and then to care of the adult patient." In the 60 years of its operation, 817 pediatric nurses graduated, later working in other parts of Canada and the United States. By 1916 there were 40 nurses at the school who were part of the staff.

A second hand store, located at 190 Sherbrook St. (now located at 961 Portage Ave.), The Nearly New Shop, operated by the McKinnon Guild of the hospital re-opened in September 1970, where proceeds go to research programs.

Starting in April 1981 The Children's Hospital created a closed circuit television channel, Children's Hospital TeleVision (CHTV), which broadcast on channel 4, for kids staying at the Hospital. However, by December there were threats to close down the station, claiming funds were exhausted. The operator of the station, Tom Lewicki, applied to the Winnipeg Foundation for $42,000 to continue to run the station through 1982. Lewicki said that because of a lack of entertainment options, young patients would tend to watch soap operas. Instead, CHTV programmed Charlie Brown and Disney movies, with a live in-hospital weekday show. Today children staying at the Hospital have more entertainment options such as YTV, Teletoon, videogames, YouTube (via tablet or smartphone), so there is less need for CHTV.

In the mid-1980s a large addition to the Children's Hospital was constructed and opened in 1986. During construction there were several delays.

Today the hospital has an emergency department for children and has pediatric and neo-natal intensive care units. There are also inpatient units for surgery, pediatric oncology, burns and plastic surgery. There are numerous outpatient clinics.

The Child Life Department is an integral part of Children's Hospital. This department of specialists is involved in running the playroom, the in-hospital television station (CHTV), provided for free, now on channel 7. The "Good Day Show" is broadcast at daily at 1 PM. Music therapy and the clown program. This department exists to help children and their families cope with all aspects of illness and hospitalization by relieving stress and anxiety.

In late August 2019, David Langdon, the clown character of the Children's Hospital, announced his retirement after 30 years of doing the job for the Hospital.

== Trivia ==
Tommy Douglas, the Father of Medicare in Canada, in an interview attributed the efforts of the Children's Hospital of Winnipeg and the "very famous orthopedic surgeon Dr. R. J. Smith" for saving his leg at age 10.
