= Information continuity =

In the healthcare industry, information continuity is the process by which information relevant to a patient's care is made available to both the patient and the provider at the right place and the right time, to facilitate ongoing health care management and continuity of care.

This is an extension of the concept of continuity of care, which is defined by the American Academy of Family Physicians in their definition of continuity of care as "the process by which the patient and the physician are cooperatively involved in ongoing health care management toward the goal of high quality, cost-effective medical care."

There is a non-information technology reference to informational continuity — the use of information on past events and personal circumstances to make current care appropriate for each individual. This exists with management continuity and relational continuity.

Information continuity in the information technology sense may exist alongside physical care continuity, such as when a medical chart arrives with a patient to the hospital. Information continuity may also be separate, such as when a patient's electronic records are sent to a treating physician before the patient arrives at a care site.

Creating information continuity in health care typically involves the use of health information technology to link systems using standards. Information continuity will become more and more important as patients in health care systems expect that their treating physicians have all of their medical information across the health care spectrum.

This use of this term in health information technology initiated at Seattle, Washington, at the Group Health Cooperative non-profit care system to describe activities including data sharing, allergy and medication reconciliation, and interfacing of data between health care institutions.

== See also ==
- Health care continuity
