= Health Sciences Centre (Winnipeg) =

Hospital in Winnipeg, Canada

- Shared Health

Geography
- Location: 820 Sherbrook Street, Winnipeg, Manitoba, Canada
- Coordinates: 49°54′14″N 097°09′35″W

Organization
- Care system: Public Medicare (Canada)
- Type: Teaching
- Affiliated university: University of Manitoba

Services
- Emergency department: Yes, level I trauma centre
- Beds: 780

Helipads
- Helipad: (TC LID: CWH7)
Number	Length		Surface
Number	ft	m	Surface
FATO	86	26	Concrete

History
- Founded: 1973

Links
- Website: www.hsc.mb.ca
- Lists: Hospitals in Canada

The Health Sciences Centre (HSC), located in Winnipeg, is the largest health-care facility in Manitoba and one of the largest hospitals in Canada. It serves the residents of Manitoba, Northwestern Ontario, and Nunavut as both a teaching hospital and as a research centre. HSC is a tertiary care hospital, encompassing many different specialty medical and surgical services. The Health Sciences Centre employs around 8,000 people. A few other health-related institutions are located adjacent to the hospital.

The HSC has a 39-acre (16 ha) campus and houses various operations. Adjoined to the west of HSC is the University of Manitoba's Faculty of Health Sciences, a complex of ten buildings. The Cadham Provincial Laboratory is located next door to the hospital and is the main research and investigative arm of the government of Manitoba for infectious disease. The Canadian Blood Services main building is located across the street from the hospital. CancerCare Manitoba is also located adjacent to the hospital.

The Emergency Room (ER) is the busiest ER in Manitoba and sees over 330 patients a day and over 115,000 visits a year. HSC also hosts the province's first and only hospital-based heliport which receives critical patients requiring helicopter transport.

== History ==
The Health Sciences Centre was established in 1973 by the Government of Manitoba. It combined the Winnipeg General Hospital, Children's Hospital of Winnipeg, Manitoba Rehabilitation Hospital, and the D.A. Stewart Centre (Respiratory Hospital) into a campus with one administration.

On 1 April 2000, The Health Sciences Centre Act amalgamated the HSC with the Winnipeg Regional Health Authority (WRHA); however, the act was subsequently repealed by Manitoba's Legislative Assembly and, a year later, HSC became an operating division of the WRHA, governed by the WRHA Board of Directors.

In November 2008, changes were made in the hospital's triage system, following the death of Brian Sinclair.

On 28 November 2016, the new HSC helipad opened up on top of the diagnostic imaging centre.

On 5 April 2019, responsibility over HSC was given to Shared Health.

== Facilities ==
Found on the Health Sciences Centre campus are various health-care facilities.

- Brodie Centre (University of Manitoba Bannatyne Campus) — adjoined to the west of HSC; houses the University of Manitoba's Faculty of Health Sciences (including the Colleges of Medicine, Pharmacy, Dentistry, and Rehabilitation Sciences), a complex of ten buildings.
  - Apotex Centre — houses U of M's Faculty of Pharmacy
  - John Buhler Research Centre — upper level of Brodie Centre
- Cadham Provincial Laboratory — located next door to the hospital; the main research and investigative arm of the Government of Manitoba for infectious disease.
- Canadian Blood Services main building — located across the street (north) from the hospital.
- CancerCare Manitoba — located adjacent to the hospital.
- Manitoba Clinic
- Mental Health Crisis Response Centre
- HSC PsycHealth Centre
- HSC Winnipeg Children's Hospital
- HSC Winnipeg Women’s Hospital
- Winnipeg Cyclotron Facility (WCF) — opened in 2010 to expand HSC's capacity to provide PET scans.

=== Kleysen Institute for Advanced Medicine ===
The Kleysen Institute for Advanced Medicine (KIAM) is a 100,000 sq ft (9,300 m^{2}) medical research facility that focuses on neuroscience, infectious disease, advanced imaging, and medical information. It houses 300 researchers and staff and attracts visiting physicians from across the country.

Named after local businessman and fundraiser Hubert Kleysen, the $25-million project was announced in June 2005 and completed in 2012.

== Gallery ==
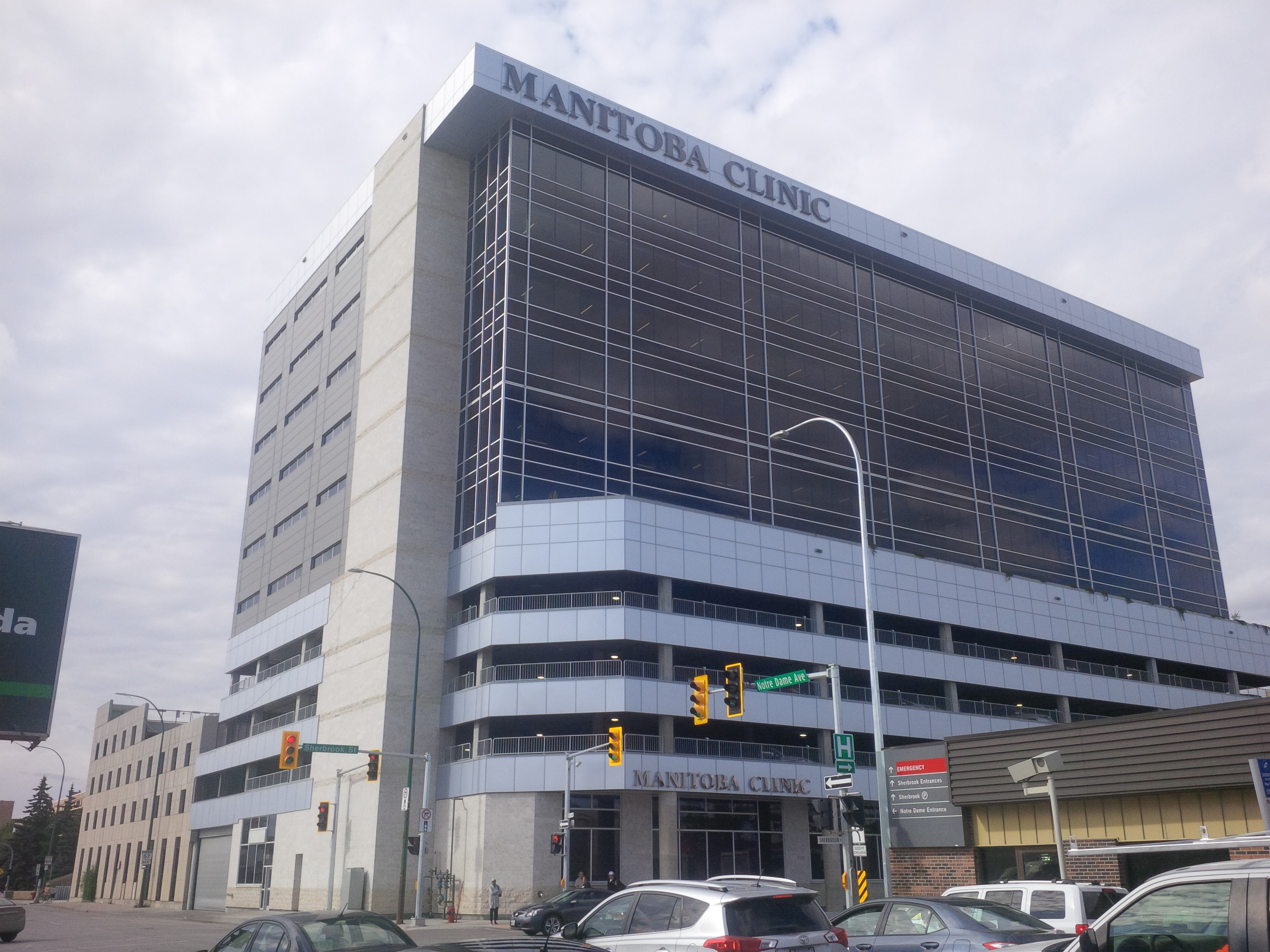
Manitoba Clinic

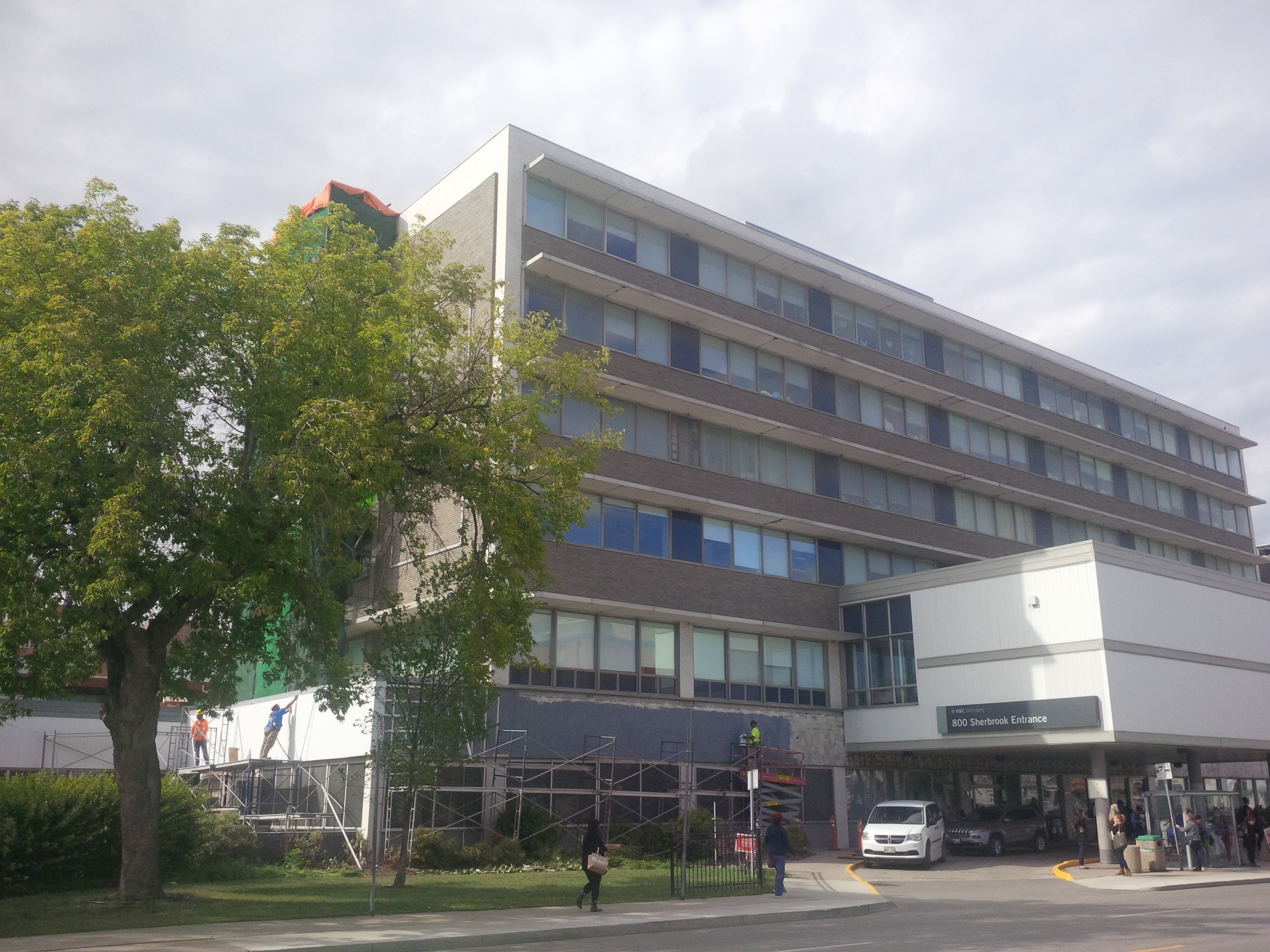
HSC Winnipeg Rehab Respiratory Hospital

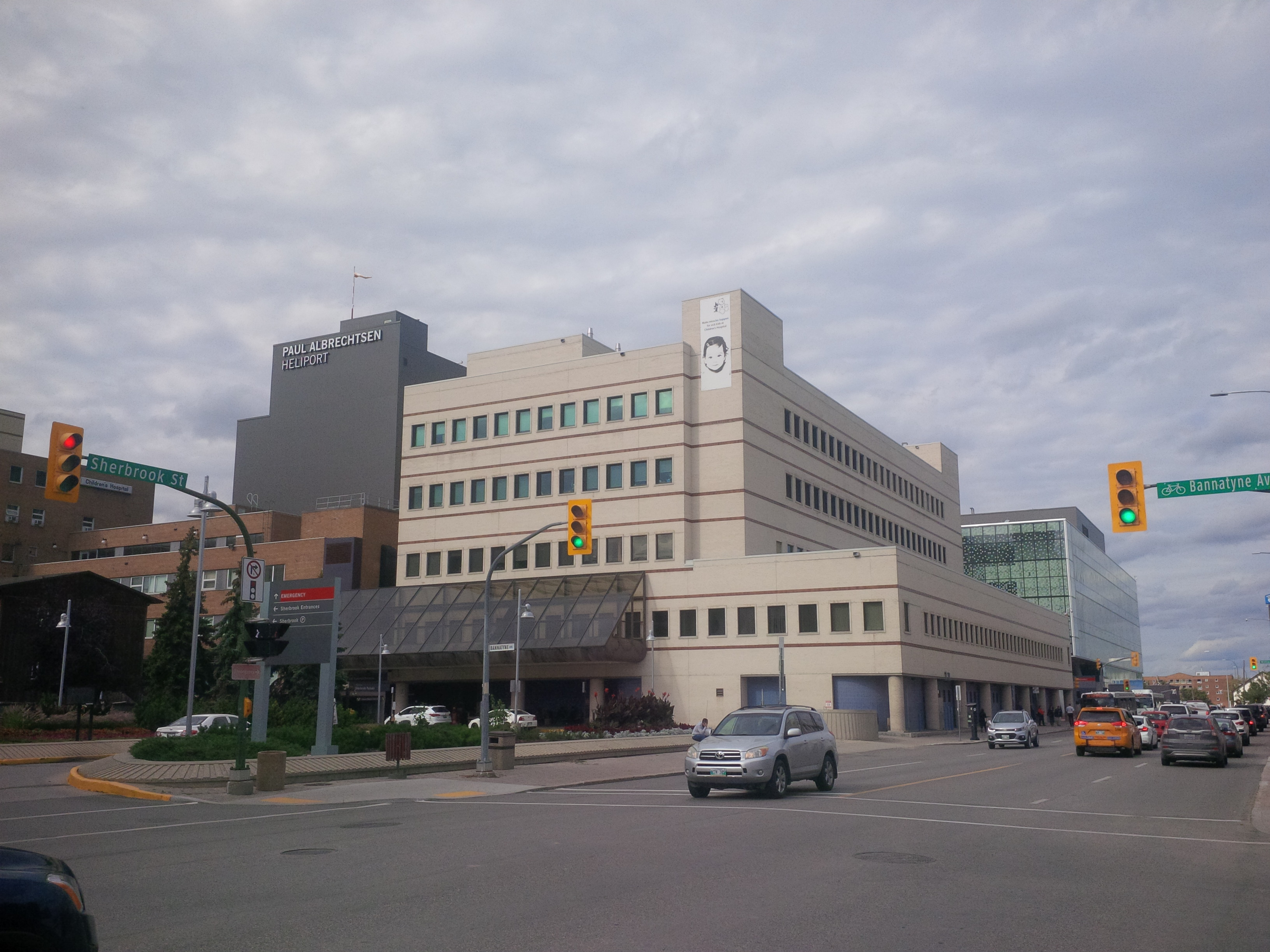
Children's Hospital of Winnipeg complex

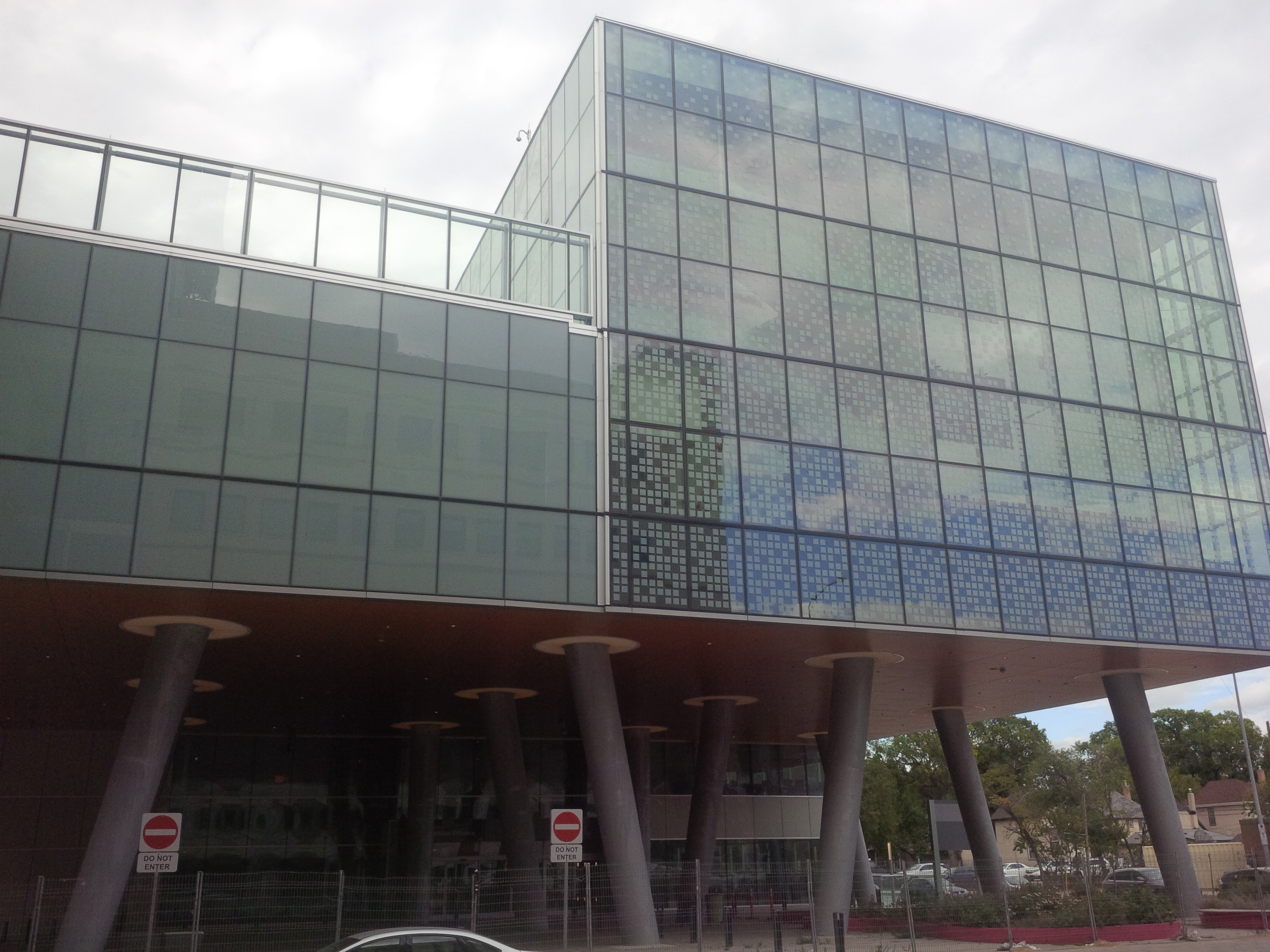
Women's Pavilion at HSC Winnipeg
