= Northern Regional Health Authority =

Health authority overview
- Formed: May 2012
- Type: Regional health authority
- Jurisdiction: northern Manitoba
- Headquarters: Flin Flon, The Pas, and Thompson
- Annual budget: $ 220 m CAD (2020)
- Health authority executives: Carrie Atkinson, Board Chair; Raj Sewda, CEO
- Key documents: Regional Health Authorities Act; Personal Health Information Act; Mental Health Act
- Website: northernhealthregion.com

The Northern Regional Health Authority (NRHA) is the governing body responsible for healthcare delivery and regulation for the Northern Health Region (NHR)—specifically northern Manitoba, excluding Churchill.

The NRHA covers the largest geographical area of the 5 regional health authorities (RHAs) in Manitoba, spanning over 396,000 km^{2} (153,000 sq mi), or nearly two-thirds of the province. It was formed in 2012 by the merger of the former NOR-MAN and Burntwood Regional Health Authorities.

Within the region, there are 2 cities, 6 towns, 1 rural municipality, 1 local government district, and numerous unorganized territories made up of hamlets and cottage settlements; as well as 26 First Nations communities and 16 Northern Affairs communities. The NRHA maintains offices in each of its three major centres: Flin Flon, The Pas, and Thompson.

== Communities ==
Accounting for just below 6% of the provincial population, the Northern Health Region has a population of 74,175 people. With an area of over 396,000 km^{2} (153,000 sq mi), the region has a population density of 0.18 persons per km²—compared to 2.19 persons per km² for the entire province of Manitoba.

The region has a young population with a median age of 26 (compared to Manitoba at 37), and nearly one in three residents (30%) of the region are under the age of 15 (compared to 19% of Manitoba residents). Contrastly, 6.1% of Northern Region residents are age 65 and older (compared to 14.1% of Manitobans).

Within the region, there are:

- 2 cities (Thompson and Flin Flon)
- 6 towns (The Pas, Gillam, Grand Rapids, Leaf Rapids, Lynn Lake, and Snow Lake)
- 1 rural municipality (Kelsey)
- 1 local government district (Mystery Lake)
- 26 First Nations communities
- 16 Northern Affairs communities
- Numerous unorganized territories made up of hamlets and cottage settlements (e.g. Norway House)

=== Indigenous communities ===
The NRHA serves 26 First Nations communities, or 'reserves'. According to Manitoba Health's 2012 census, about 40% of the region's residents live on reserves while the remaining 60% live off-reserve.

However, residents frequently travel on and off reserve and access health services in both locations. In addition to issues of gaps in patient follow-ups and on-going continuity of care, having more than one health-services provider—First Nation Inuit Health (FNIH) for on-reserve services and the Region for off-reserve services—can cause confusion among residents in terms of accessing care.

There are over a dozen additional First Nations communities that the NRHA serves; a challenge for the NRHA is that many of these First Nations communities do not have year-round all-weather road access, with many of these First Nations communities relying on rail, boat, and/or air service to travel. This limited access has significant implications on the health of the residents.

Per the 2006 Census, over two-thirds (67.4%) of residents self-identify as "Aboriginal." Residents of the Northern Health Region account for 81% of Manitoba residents who report speaking an Aboriginal language; just below one-third of residents (31.9%) report speaking at least one Aboriginal language compared to only 6% of Manitobans overall.

== Facilities ==
The NRHA maintains offices in each of its three major centres: Flin Flon, The Pas, and Thompson.

Location		Hospital (acute care beds)	Health centre	Other sites
Place	Reserve	Hospital (acute care beds)	Health centre	Other sites
Brochet	Barren Lands			Nursing station
Cormorant			Cormorant Health Care Centre	
Cranberry Portage				Cranberry Portage Wellness Centre
Cross Lake	Pimicikamak			Nursing station
Easterville				Provincial nursing station
Flin Flon		Flin Flon General Hospital (34)	Flin Flon Primary Health Care Centre	Flin Flon Personal Care Home; Northern Lights Manor; Flin Flon Clinic
—	Garden Hill			Nursing station
Gillam		Gillam Hospital (7)	Gillam Public Health	
Gods Lake	God's Lake FN			Nursing station
God’s River	Manto Sipi			
Grand Rapids	Misipawistik			
Ilford			Ilford Community Health Centre	
Lac Brochet	Northlands			Nursing station (Note: First Nation Inuit Health Branch (FNIHB))
Leaf Rapids			Leaf Rapids Health Centre	
Lynn Lake		Lynn Lake Hospital (11)	Lynn Lake Public Health	
Moose Lake	Mosakahiken			Provincial nursing station
Nelson House	Nisichawayasihk			Nisichawayasihk Personal Care Home; Nursing Station
Norway House				Nursing station; Pinaow Wachi Ltd. Personal Care Home
Opaskwayak Cree Nation			Beatrice Wilson Health Centre	McGillivary Care Home
Oxford House	Bunibonibee			George Colon Memorial Home Inc.; Nursing station
The Pas		St. Anthony’s General Hospital (40)	The Pas Primary Health Care Centre	St. Paul’s Personal Care Home; Rosaire House Addiction Centre; The Pas Clinic; Fischer Avenue Clinic
Pikwitonei				Nursing station
Pukatawagan	Mathias Colomb			Nursing station
Red Sucker Lake	Red Sucker Lake FN			Nursing station
Shamattawa First Nation				Nursing station
Sherridon			Sherridon Health Centre	
Snow Lake			Snow Lake Health Centre	
South Indian Lake	O-Pipon-Na-Piwin			Nursing station
Split Lake	Tataskweyak			Nursing station
St. Theresa Point First Nation				Nursing station
Tadoule Lake	Sayisi			Nursing station
Thicket Portage			Health Centre	
Thompson		Thompson General Hospital (79)	Thompson Public Health	Acute Brain Injury House; Hope North Recovery Centre for Youth; Northern Consultation Clinic; Northern Spirit Manor; Thompson Clinic
Wasagamack	Wasagamack FN			Nursing station
Wabowden			Wabowden Community Health Centre	
York Factory First Nation				
