= Peace Country Health Region =

Peace Country Health Region was the governing body for healthcare regulation in an area of the Canadian province of Alberta until 2008 when the regional health authorities were merged into the province-wide Alberta Health Services. The area region included the communities of:

- Beaverlodge
- Rycroft
- Spirit River
- Saddle Hills County
- Fairview
- Hines Creek
- Fox Creek
- Grande Cache
- Grande Prairie
- Grimshaw
- Berwyn
- High Prairie
- Hythe
- Manning
- Nampa
- Northern Sunrise County
- Peace River
- Sexsmith
- Buffalo Lake
- Teepee Creek
- Donnelly
- Falher
- Girouxville
