= David Thompson Regional Health Authority =

David Thompson Regional Health Authority was the governing body for healthcare regulation in a central area of the Canadian province of Alberta. In April 2009, it was merged with other similar organizations to form Alberta Health Services.

The area region included the communities of:

- Bentley
- Breton
- Castor
- Consort
- Coronation
- Drayton Valley
- Drumheller
- Eckville
- Elnora
- Hanna
- Innisfail
- Lacombe
- Linden
- Olds
- Ponoka
- Red Deer
- Rimbey
- Rocky Mountain House
- Stettler
- Sundre
- Sylvan Lake
- Three Hills
- Trochu
- Wetaskiwin
- Winfield
