= Chinook Health =

Chinook Health is part of Alberta Health Services, the governing body for healthcare regulation in the Canadian province of Alberta. Chinook Health administers public health services in southwestern Alberta, Canada; the region it covers is bordered on the south by Montana, on the west by British Columbia, on the north by Calgary Health Region and on the east by Palliser Health Region.

== Government ==
Until May 15, 2008 the Chinook Regional Health Authority was governed by a 12 member Board whose members were appointed from communities within the region. On May 15, 2008 the Board (and the boards of all the other 8 health regions) was dissolved by Health Minister Ron Liepert, with governance transferred to the province-wide Alberta Health Services Board.

== Demographics ==
The region is 25,947 km^{2} and contains a population of over 150,000, which is 5% of Alberta's population. The population of Lethbridge makes up over half of the region's population.

Persons over the age of 65 years made up over 1/10 of the CHR population in 1998.

Approximately 10,000 Aboriginal people live in the region, most of whom are of the Blackfoot Nations. The number also includes some Cree, Métis, Inuit and others.

Additionally, roughly 15,000 Kanadier Mennonites live in the Chinook Health region. Numbers vary as groups migrate between home communities in Central America and the region.

== Facilities ==
Chinook Health operates 12 hospitals, 15 community health centres, and 5 continuing care facilities in 14 communities.

== Employment ==
The health region employs more people in Lethbridge than any other single organization. Employees include 3,500 staff and 200 physicians.

== Services ==
Chinook Health provides the following services throughout the region:

- Breast health
- Cardiac rehab
- Chinook Rehabilitation Program (CRP)
- Community nutrition
- Diabetes management
- Emergency and critical care
- Healing arts
- Health protection
- Health promotion
- Laboratory
- Medical imaging
- Medicine and surgery
- Mental health
- Nutrition services
- Oral health
- Pharmacy
- Physicians
- Population health
- Respiratory
- Seniors' health
- Social Work
- Spiritual care services
- Transitional care
- Wellness services
- Women's and children's health
