= Lethbridge Iron Works =

Lethbridge Iron Works Co. Ltd., also known as LETH IRON, is an iron foundry based in Lethbridge, Alberta, Canada. Founded in 1898, it is one of the oldest businesses in Lethbridge. Initially established to serve the coal industry in southern Alberta, LETH IRON has evolved over the past century into a jobbing iron foundry, providing castings for clients in various sectors such as agriculture, automotive, construction, oil & gas, and rail across North America.
