= Death of Brian Sinclair =

Indigenous Canadian man who died in a waiting room, awaiting medical attention

Brian Sinclair (June 24, 1963 – September 21, 2008) was an Indigenous Canadian man whose death in a hospital waiting room led to widespread concern on the state of the healthcare system in Canada. On September 21, 2008, Sinclair waited 34 hours for medical attention at Winnipeg's Health Sciences Centre. Sinclair died while he was waiting and had developed rigor mortis when medical staff attended to him.

== Hospital visit ==
On September 19, 2008, after not urinating for 24 hours because of a blocked catheter, Sinclair visited a community health clinic that referred him to the Winnipeg Health Sciences Centre.

At 3:00 p.m., Sinclair arrived via taxi to the emergency room at the Health Sciences Centre with a note from the clinic that explained his condition. Sinclair spoke with a triage aide, who instructed him to wait in the waiting room. The aide wrote something on paper before Sinclair wheeled himself into the waiting room. The piece of paper has never been found.

During the evening of September 19, 2008, the triage list was discarded.

At 1:00 a.m. on September 20, 2008, other patients said they spoke to Sinclair, who had been waiting for 10 hours. One patient allegedly spoke to medical staff to urge them to attend to Sinclair; medical staff responded that they were attending to other patients. While he was waiting, Sinclair had also vomited several times.

Between the late evening of September 20 and the early morning of September 21, Sinclair died in the waiting room.

Before 1:00 a.m. on September 21, 2008, a nurse was requested to check on Sinclair. The nurse did not believe that the request was urgent and instead completed paperwork. Shortly afterward, a nurse from another facility approached a security guard and stated she thought that Sinclair was dead, as his neck was "pasty" and his catheter bag was empty. The security guard attended to Sinclair, pinched his neck, and received no response from him. The security guard then contacted medical staff and informed them that he believed that Sinclair had died. The staff first thought that it was a joke and then moved Sinclair into a resuscitation room, where he was immediately declared deceased.

An autopsy later found that Sinclair had a treatable bladder infection brought on by a blocked catheter and had been deceased for two to seven hours before he had been noticed by medical staff.

== Aftermath ==
During his time in the waiting room, Sinclair had been observed on at least 17 occasions. In several instances, security staff or other patients in the waiting room raised concerns about his condition to the nursing staff but were ignored. An inquest into Sinclair's death found that medical staff assumed that he was intoxicated, had already been discharged and had nowhere to go, had been triaged already, and was waiting for a bed in the back of the treatment area, or was homeless and seeking shelter from the cold weather.

Sinclair was an Indigenous double-amputee who used a wheelchair. Sinclair's family alleged assumptions were made about him because he was an Indigenous man in a wheelchair. The Winnipeg Regional Health Authority conducted an internal review and concluded that it would be unfair to discipline staff. The review remarked that staff, including one who had known Sinclair since he was 16 years old, were hurt by such allegations and stated, “The staff of the adult emergency department are hurt, angered, and frustrated that they have not been able to tell their story to counteract these allegations."

In 2013, the president of the Winnipeg Regional Health Authority stated, "Mr. Sinclair's death was preventable. He came to us seeking care, and we failed him." The health authority apologized to Sinclair's family and began an inquest into his death.

In 2014, a report which concluded that Sinclair's death had been preventable put forward 63 recommendations to overhaul the front end of Winnipeg's healthcare services, including how patients in emergency rooms are triaged and registered.

In 2017, a group of doctors across Canada claimed that Sinclair died because of racism. The group recommended that federal and provincial governments implement policies to address racism in health care.

== See also ==
- Health Sciences Centre (Winnipeg)
- Winnipeg Regional Health Authority
