= Palliser Health Region =

Palliser Health Region was the governing body for healthcare regulation in an area of the Canadian province of Alberta until 2008 when the regional health authorities were merged into the province-wide Alberta Health Services. The area region included the communities of:

- Bassano
- Bow Island
- Brooks
- Empress
- Medicine Hat
- Oyen
