= Interlake-Eastern Regional Health Authority =

- Office régional de la santé d’Entre-les-Lacs et de l’Est

Health authority overview
- Formed: 2012
- Type: Regional health authority
- Jurisdiction: Interlake and Eastman regions, Manitoba
- Headquarters: 233A Main St, Selkirk, MB
- Employees: 3,200 (Oct 2020)
- Annual budget: $ CAD (2020)
- Health authority executives: Michele Polinuk, Board Chair; Marion Ellis, CEO
- Key documents: Regional Health Authorities Act; Personal Health Information Act; Mental Health Act
- Website: www.ierha.ca

Interlake-Eastern Regional Health Authority (IERHA; French: Office régional de la santé d’Entre-les-Lacs et de l’Est) is the governing body responsible for healthcare delivery and regulation for the Interlake and eastern regions of Manitoba.

Interlake-Eastern Regional Health Authority is one of 5 regional health authorities (RHAs) in Manitoba and is designated as an official French-language RHA. It was formed in 2012 by the merger of the former Interlake and North Eastman Regional Health Authorities.

As one of Manitoba's largest health regions, with an area of 61,000 square kilometres (24,000 sq mi), the Interlake-Eastern region (IER) stretches from the east to the Manitoba–Ontario border; north to the 53rd parallel; west to the eastern shores of Lake Manitoba; and south to Winnipeg’s northern perimeter, where it dips down eastward, slightly past the city below the Trans-Canada Highway towards Ontario. Moreover, a significant portion of the region is considered to be part of northern Manitoba—such as Berens River—some with a remote area that is only accessible via air, water, or a winter road system.

As of October 2019, the IERHA includes 10 hospitals, 16 personal care homes, 17 community health offices, and 19 EMS stations; as well as 1 "Quick Care" clinic (Selkirk) and 6 dialysis sites (with 40 stations in total). The Interlake-Eastern Health Foundation provides financial support to all of the region's facilities and programs to further improve "dedicated patient care."

== Communities ==
As of June 2019, the Interlake-Eastern region has a population of 132,000 residents, 27% of which is represented by the IER's 17 First Nation communities.

Designated as an official French-language regional health authority, the Interlake-Eastern Regional Health Authority has 2 French-language service areas: one surrounding St. Laurent on the west, the other surrounding St. Georges and Powerview-Pine Falls on the east.

The region includes the communities of:

- Arborg
- Ashern
- Beausejour
- Fisher Branch
- Pinawa
- Gimli
- Lac du Bonnet
- Lundar
- Oakbank
- Pine Falls
- Riverton
- Selkirk
- Stonewall
- Whitemouth

== Facilities ==
Health sites in IER
Location (type)	Municipality	Health centres		Other health sites			
Location (type)	Municipality	Health centre	Hospital (acute care beds)	Personal care home	Community health office	EMS site	Dialysis and other
Arborg (town)	N/A	Arborg & Districts Health Centre	Arborg Hospital (14)	Yes	Yes	Yes	
Ashern	West Interlake	Lakeshore General Hospital (14)		Yes	Yes	Yes	Dialysis site
Beausejour (town)	N/A	Beausejour Health Centre	Beausejour Hospital (30)	Yes	Yes	Yes	
Berens River (unincorporated)	N/A						Dialysis site
Bissett (unincorporated)	N/A					Yes (Note: Staffed on-call only)	
Eriksdale	West Interlake	E.M. Crowe Memorial Hospital (13)		Yes	Yes		
—	Fisher					Yes (Note: Not staffed by IERHA)	
Fisher Branch	Fisher			Yes	Yes		
Gimli (unincorporated)	Gimli	Gimli Community Health Centre	Johnson Memorial Hospital (26)	Yes	Yes	Yes	Dialysis site
Gypsumville (unincorporated)	Grahamdale					Yes	
Hodgson (unincorporated)	Fisher						Dialysis site
Lac du Bonnet (town)	N/A			Yes	Yes	Yes	
Lundar (local urban district)	Coldwell			Yes	Yes	Yes	
Oakbank (unincorporated)	Springfield			Yes	Yes	Yes	
Pinawa (local government district)	N/A	Pinawa Hospital (17)			Yes	Yes	
Pine Falls (town)	N/A	Pine Falls Health Complex	Pine Falls Hospital (23)	Yes	Yes	Yes	Dialysis site
Riverton (unincorporated urban)	Bifrost – Riverton				Yes	Yes	
Selkirk (city)	N/A	Selkirk Regional Health Centre	Selkirk & District General Hospital (65)	Yes (3)	Yes	Yes	"Quick Care" clinic; Dialysis site
St. Laurent (unincorporated)	St. Laurent				Yes	Yes	
Stonewall (town)	N/A	Stonewall & District Health Centre	Dr. Evelyn Memorial Hospital (15)	Yes	Yes	Yes	
Teulon (town)	N/A	Hunter Memorial Hospital (20)		Yes	Yes	Yes	
—	West St. Paul					Yes	
Whitemouth	Whitemouth				Yes	Yes	

=== Selkirk Regional Health Centre ===
Selkirk Regional Health Centre
- Selkirk & District General Hospital

Geography
- Location: 120 Easton Drive, Selkirk, MB

Organisation
- Funding: Government of Manitoba; Interlake-Eastern Health Foundation; Lions Club International Foundation ($130,000 for new MRI)
- Type: Regional

Services
- Beds: 65: 55 medical/surgical; 6 obstetrics; 4 special-care

Links
- Website: IERHA SHRC page
- Building details

General information
- Renovated: 2014-2017
- Renovation cost: $111 m CAD

Technical details
- Material: Tyndall stone
- Floor area: 180,506 sq ft (16,769.6 m^{2})

Renovating team
- Architects: EllisDon (construction); LM Architectural Group and Stantec (design)
- Awards and prizes: LEED silver standard

Other information
- Parking: 332 new stalls

In 2017, the IERHA completed the Selkirk Regional Health Centre (SRHC) to better accommodate residents health-care needs in the Interlake-Eastern RHA.

The SRHC is the centre of specialty surgical services in the region, as well as the region's family birthing unit.

The new SRHC, whose construction began in Spring 2014, is located between the former general hospital at 100 Easton Dr. and the Selkirk Recreation Complex at 180 Easton Dr. Among other things, the renovation increased Selkirk's bed count from 53 to 65, expanded the outpatient area, tripled the size of the former emergency department, and provided a new interventional fluoroscopy room; as well as introducing the region's only CT-scan equipment and the region's first MRI—the 12th MRI unit in the province and one of only three outside of Winnipeg. The facility also has over 1,600 square metres (17,000 sq ft) of window.
