= Northern Health =

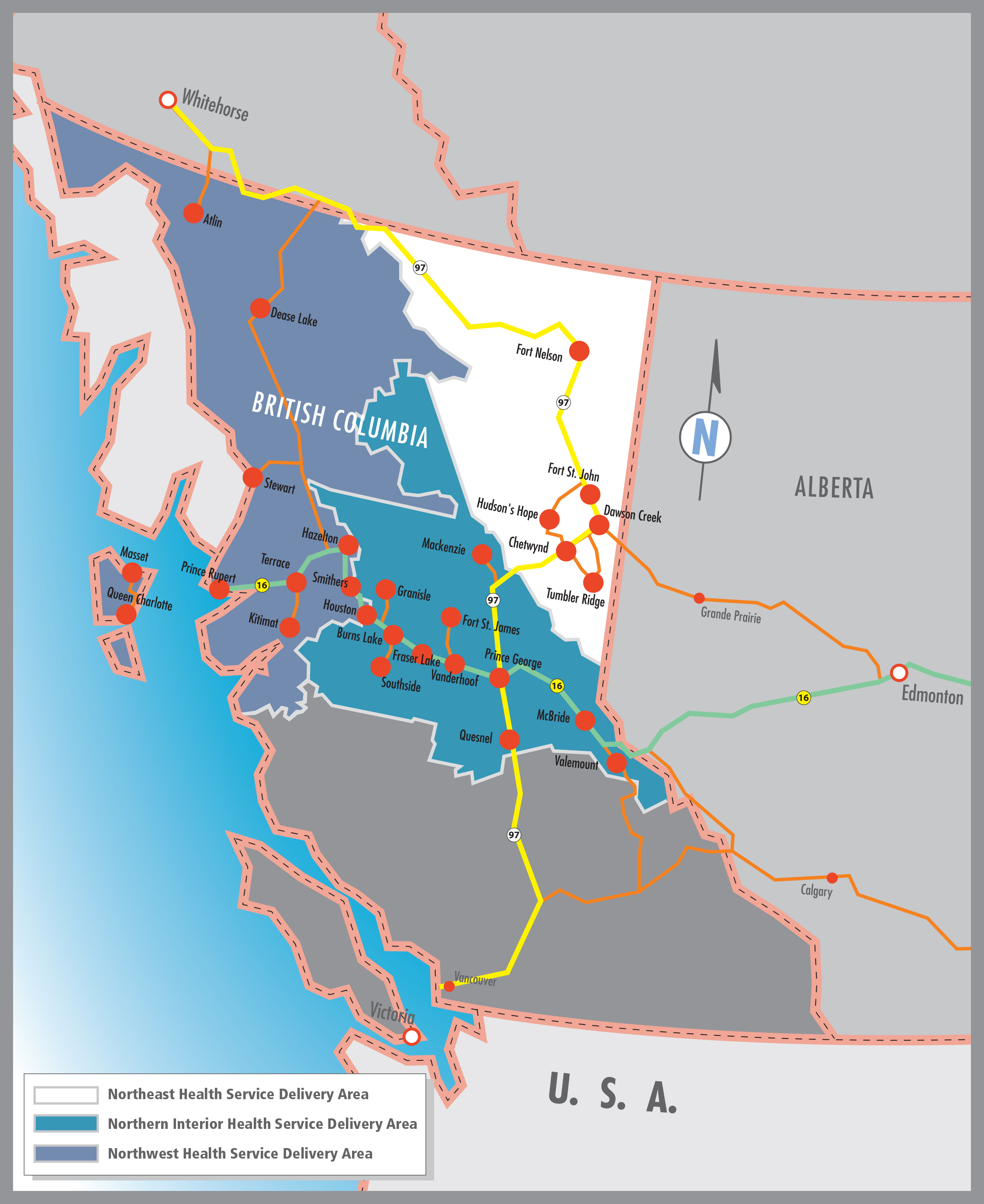
- Northern Health service area map
- Formation: 2001; 25 years ago
- Type: British Columbia Health Authority
- CEO: Cathy Ulrich
- Key people: Colleen V. Nyce (Board Chair)
- Budget: $811.5 million (CDN) (approx)
- Staff: 7400+
- Website: northernhealth.ca

Northern Health is the publicly funded healthcare provider for the northern half of the Canadian province of British Columbia. The authority maintains an Indigenous Health program and formal partnerships with First Nations and Métis organizations to support culturally safe care, reduce health disparities, and improve health outcomes for Indigenous peoples across northern British Columbia.

Northern Health serves over 300,000 people in an area of 600,000 square kilometres. It was established as one of five geographically based health authorities in 2001 by the Government of British Columbia. The health region operates over two dozen hospitals, several long-term care facilities for seniors, public health units, as well as addictions and mental health services. As of 2020, Northern Health employs over 7,000 individuals throughout the region.

== Communities ==
Northern Health services the communities of:

- Atlin
- Burns Lake
- Chetwynd
- Dawson Creek
- Fort Nelson
- Fort St. James
- Fort St. John
- Haida Gwaii (formerly Queen Charlotte Islands)
- Hazelton
- Houston
- Hudson's Hope
- Kitimat
- Mackenzie
- Masset
- McBride
- Pouce Coupe
- Prince Rupert
- Prince George
- Quesnel
- Sandspit
- Smithers
- Terrace
- Tumbler Ridge
- Valemount
- Vanderhoof

Other regional health authorities in British Columbia

- Vancouver Coastal Health
- Fraser Health
- Interior Health
- Island Health

Province-wide health authorities in British Columbia

- Provincial Health Services Authority
- First Nations Health Authority
