= Rural municipality (Canada) =

Administrative division in Canada

A rural municipality, often abbreviated RM, is a type of municipal status in the Canadian provinces of Manitoba, Saskatchewan, and Prince Edward Island. In other provinces, such as Alberta and Nova Scotia, the term refers to municipal districts that are not explicitly urban, rather than being a distinct type of municipality.

== History ==
Unlike Eastern Canada or the United States, the Prairies have never had counties.

The Municipal Ordinance of 1883 was enacted by the then North-West Territories to incorporate and empower municipalities in areas of four or more townships, establishing the offices of Treasurer, Assessor, Collector, and Auditor; departments for roads, animal control, and police; and a judiciary depending on the size of the municipality. The Ordinance also established the category of "statute labour", wherein each male inhabitant of working age in a municipality was liable for at least one day of labour for property up to and including $300, and an additional day for each $300 value increment; these days could be paid off either by performing labour on the days or paying $2 per day. The Government continued this with the Statute Labour Ordinance (1897), which established sets of statute labour and fire (SLF) districts or statute labour districts in areas not under any municipality. Prairie fires in the 19th century were devastating affairs; fire districts were precursors to local improvement districts (LIDs).

Saskatchewan and Alberta became provinces in 1905. In Saskatchewan, discontinuance of local improvement districts in favour of smaller rural municipalities began on December 13, 1909. Typically, a rural municipality consists of about nine townships, each six miles by six miles in area. Settled areas of denser populations could form urban municipalities such as villages, towns and cities. In northern Saskatchewan, the large Northern Local Improvement District was replaced by the Northern Saskatchewan Administration District in 1972, and was not subdivided into smaller rural municipalities.

== Rural municipalities by province ==
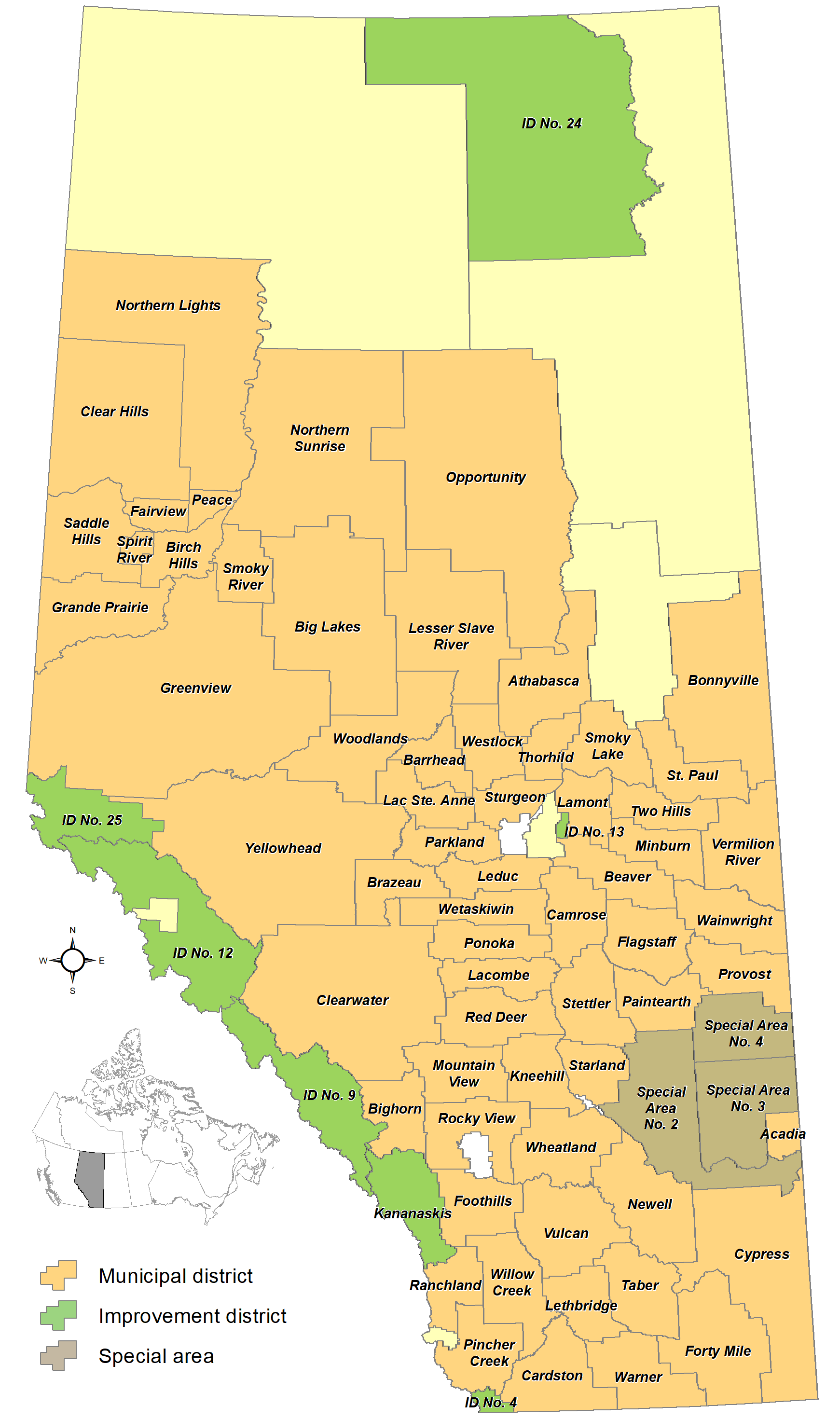
In Alberta (gold, green, and grey)

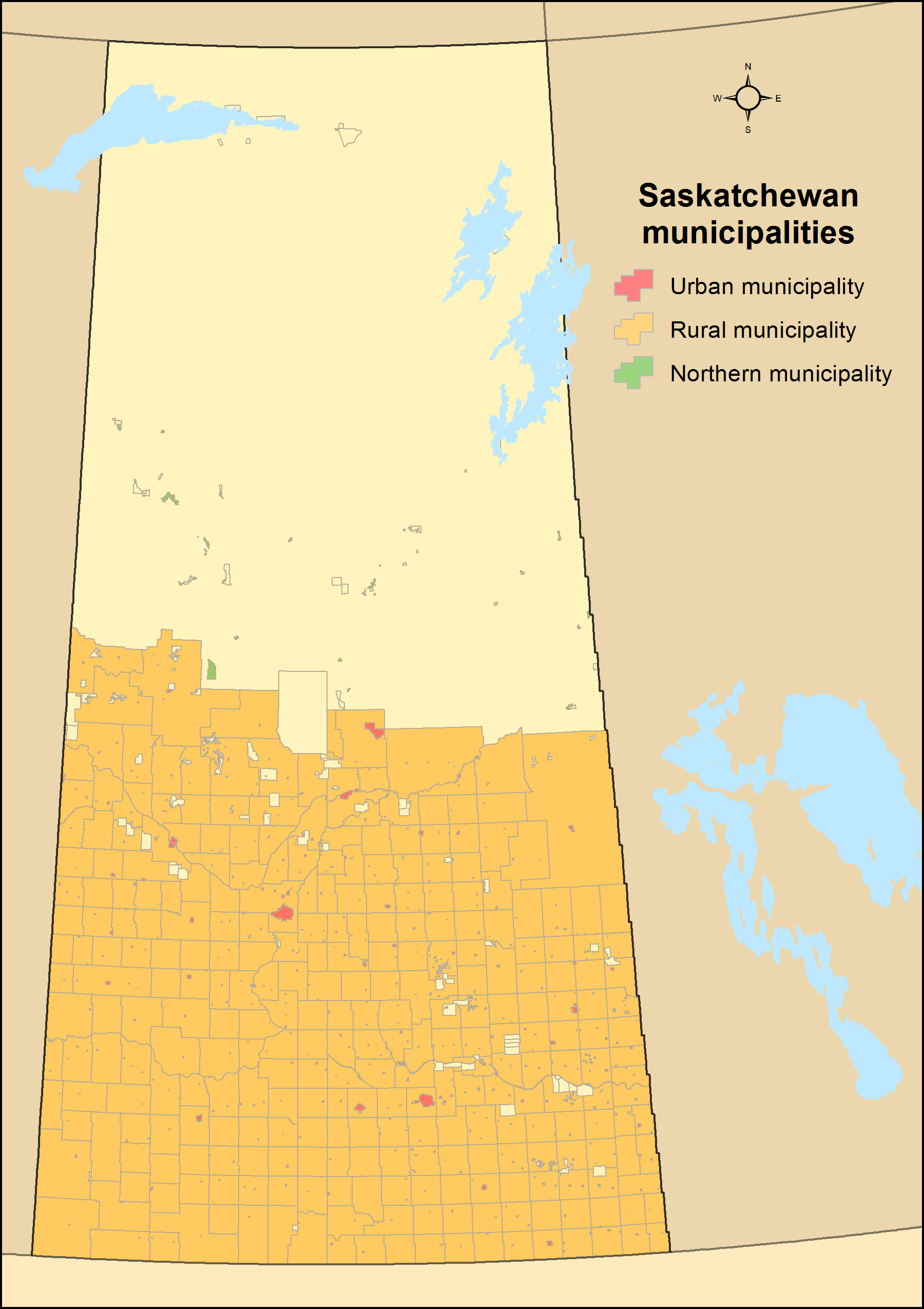
In Saskatchewan (gold)

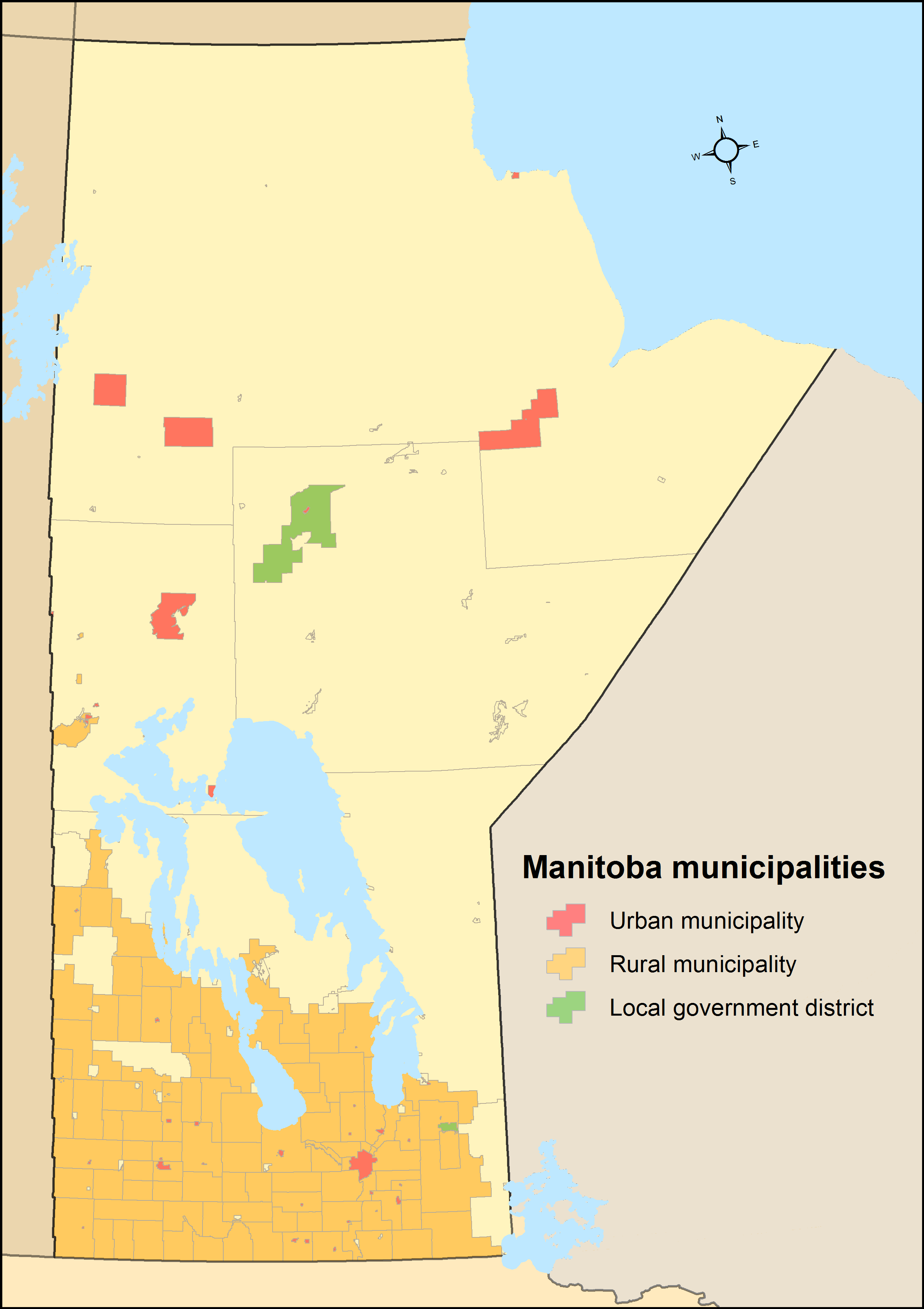
In Manitoba (gold)

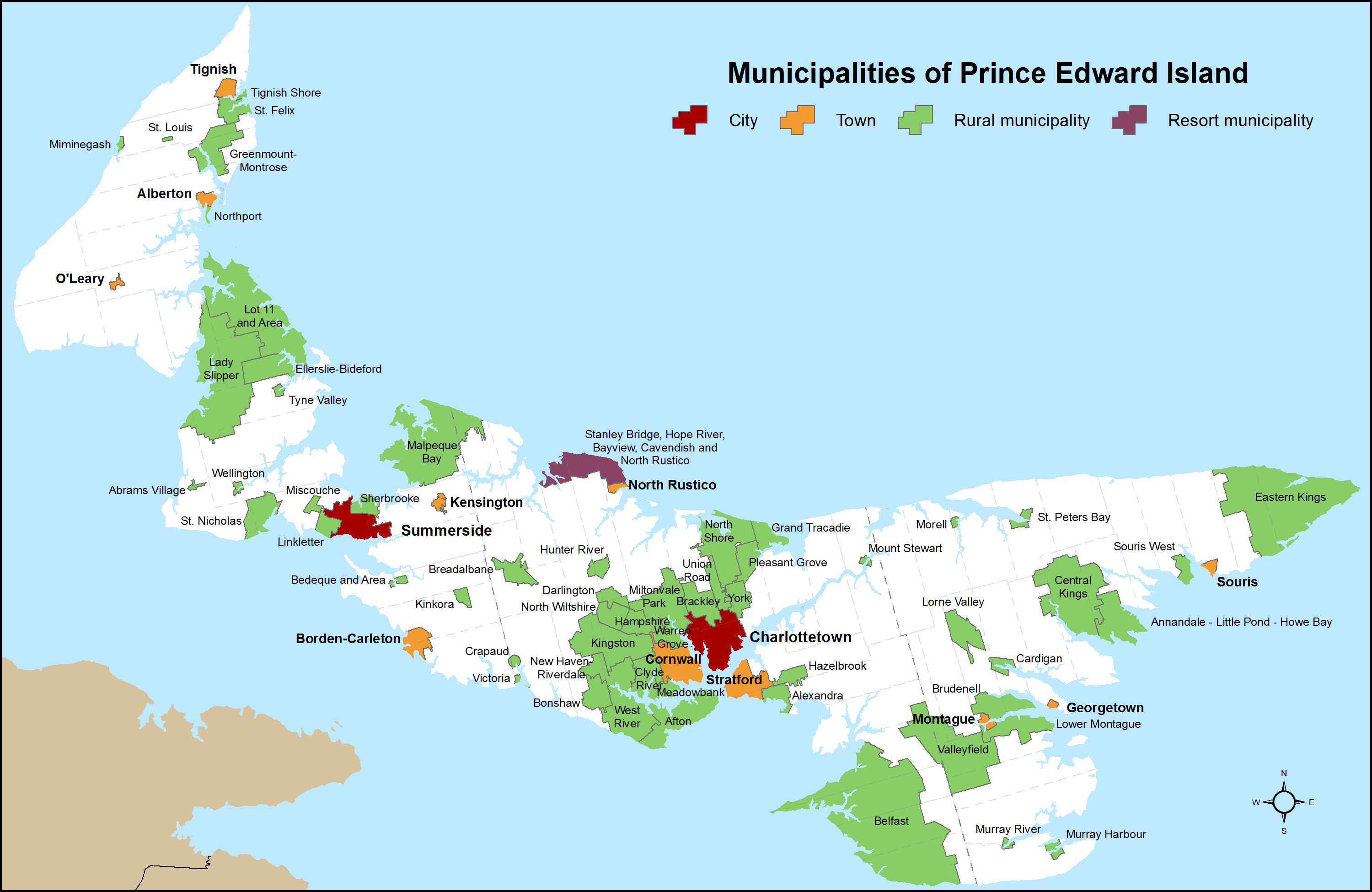
In Prince Edward Island (green)

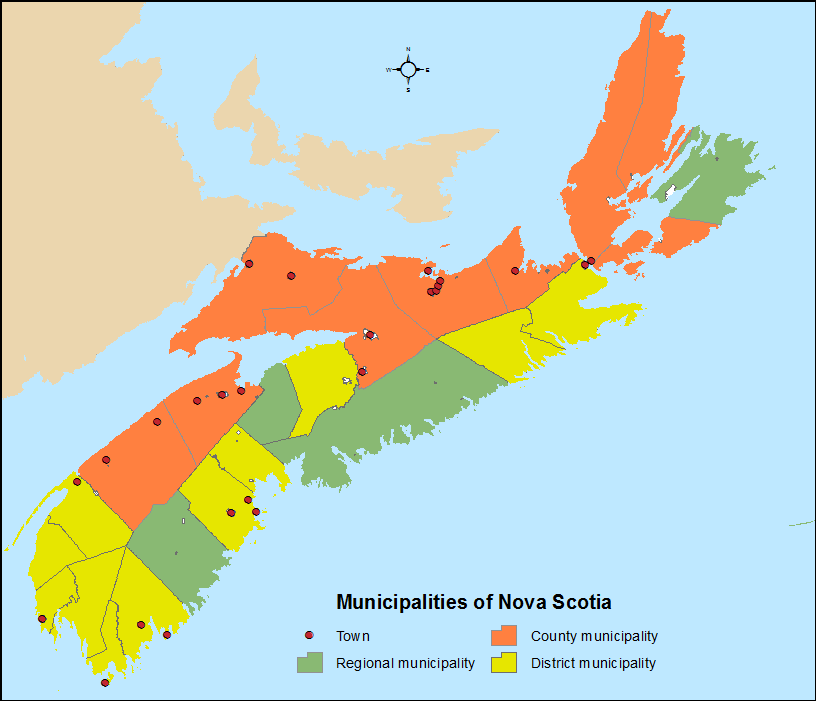
In Nova Scotia (lime green and mint green)

== See also ==
- Municipal government in Canada

== Works cited ==
- Ordinances of the North-West Territories (PDF). Regina: Nicholas Flood Davin. 1883 – via Internet Archive.
