= Transitional care =

Transitional care refers to the coordination and continuity of health care during a movement from one healthcare setting to either another or to home, called care transition, between health care practitioners and settings as their condition and care needs change during the course of a chronic or acute illness. Older adults who have a variety of health conditions often need health care services in different settings to meet their needs. For young people the focus is on moving successfully from child to adult health services.

A recent position statement from the American Geriatrics Society defines transitional care as a set of actions designed to ensure the coordination and continuity of health care as patients transfer between different locations or different levels of care within the same location. Representative locations include (but are not limited to) hospitals, sub-acute and post-acute nursing homes, the patient's home, primary and specialty care offices, and long-term care facilities. Transitional care is based on a comprehensive plan of care and the availability of health care practitioners who are well-trained in chronic care and have current information about the patient's goals, preferences, and clinical status. It includes logistical arrangements, education of the patient and family, and coordination among the health professionals involved in the transition. Transitional care, which encompasses both the sending and the receiving aspects of the transfer, is essential for persons with complex care needs.

== Defining and understanding transitional care ==
During transitions, patients with complex medical needs, primarily older patients, are at risk for poorer outcomes due to medication errors and other errors of communication among the involved healthcare providers and between providers and patients/family caregivers. Most research in the area of transitional care has studied the transition from hospitalization to the next provider setting – often a sub-acute nursing facility, a rehabilitation facility, or home either with or without professional homecare services. Adverse patient outcomes include continuation or recurrence of symptoms, temporary or permanent disability, and death.

Healthcare utilization outcomes for patients experiencing poor transitional care include returning to the emergency room or being admitted to the hospital. As healthcare expenditures rise at an unsustainable rate, there is increasing focus by patients, providers, and policymakers on restraining unnecessary resource utilization such as that incurred by preventable re-hospitalizations.

Transitional care or transition care also refers to the transition of young people with chronic conditions into adult-based services. Transition care is a Youth Health service. As children mature into young adults, they outgrow the expertise of children's services (paediatrics) and need to find an adult health service that suits them. A program in Australia GMCT Transition Care is an initiative aimed at improving continuity of care for young people with chronic health as they move from children's (paediatric) to adult health services.

== Continuity of health care ==
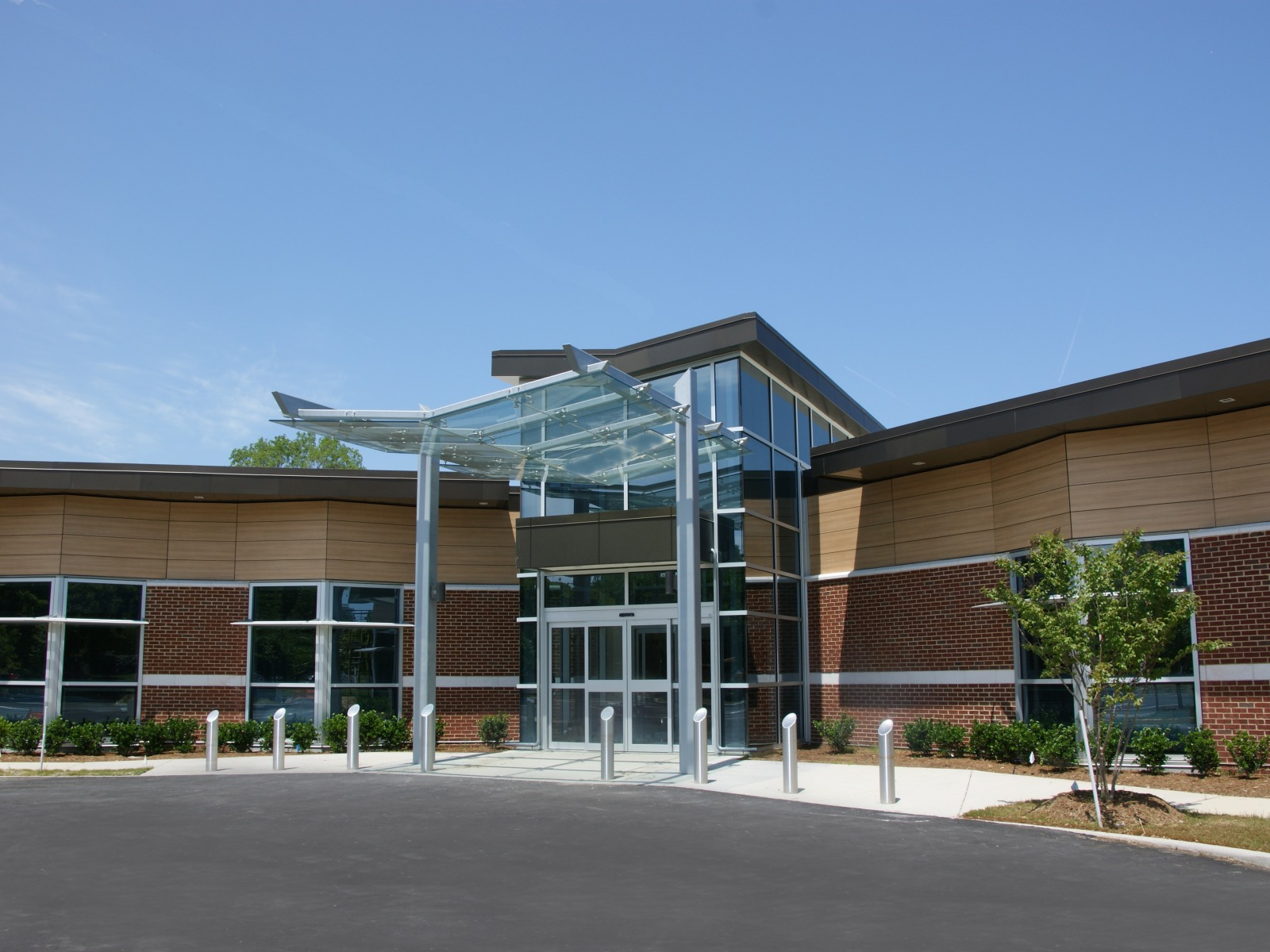
Lake Taylor Transitional Care Hospital

Continuity of health care (also called continuum of care) is to what degree the care is coherent and linked, in turn depending on the quality of information flow, interpersonal skills, and coordination of care. Continuity of health care means different things to different types of caregivers, and can be of several types:

- Continuity of information. It includes that information on prior events is used to give care that is appropriate to the patient's current circumstance.
- Continuity of personal relationships, recognizing that an ongoing relationship between patients and providers is the undergirding that connects care over time and bridges discontinuous events.
- Continuity of clinical management.

To avoid misinterpretation, the type of continuity should be agreed to before any related discussions or planning begin. Seamless care refers to an optimal situation where there is continuity in the healthcare even in the presence of many transitions.

Analysis of medical errors usually reveals the presence of many gaps in health continuity, yet only rarely do gaps produce accidents. Patient safety is increased by understanding and reinforcing health care providers' normal ability to bridge gaps.

== Continuity of Personal Relationships ==
This is also known as Relational Continuity. This type of continuity has been shown to have many benefits. It has been shown to reduce mortality across primary and secondary care.

== Measuring quality of transitional care ==
=== Care Transitions Measure ===
The only currently nationally endorsed measure of transitional care quality is the Care Transitions Measure (CTM), which is a 15-item survey for administration to patients after discharge from the hospital. The measure also exists as a 3-item survey. Patient responses to the survey predicts return to the emergency department and/or hospital. Dr. Eric Coleman and his team at the University of Colorado at Denver and Health Sciences Center developed the CTM, as well as an intervention designed to improve patient outcomes during transitions.

== Improving quality of transitional care ==
After leaving a particular care setting, older patients may not understand how to manage their health care conditions or whom to call if they have a question or if their condition gets worse. Poorly managed transitions can lead to physical and emotional stress for both patients and their caregivers. During a transition, the patients' preferences or personal goals in one setting may not be passed on to the next setting. This may result in important elements of the care plan "falling through the cracks".

Ideally, every patient's primary physician would be responsible for the patient through every health care process at all times, but this has been regarded as practically impossible, and, in reality, more effort must rather be put into making transitions more effective. Nevertheless, it has been clearly demonstrated that longitudinal, personal continuity with a general practitioner reduces the need for out-of-hours services and acute admissions to hospital. Furthermore mortality is lowered. The associations are dose dependent and probably causal.

=== Care Transitions Intervention ===
The Care Transitions Intervention (CTI) is a coaching intervention to assist patients in resuming self-care following a change in health status. It uses coaching techniques to ensure that patients are comfortable in managing their own medications and their own health information, understand the signs and symptoms that should lead them to contact a healthcare provider, and have assertion skills to ask important questions of providers. Although the coaching intervention occurs for the first 30 days following the transition, this approach has been shown to significantly reduce hospital readmission as far out as six months.

In 2002, the University of Colorado Denver implemented a program called Care Transitions Intervention®. As part of the program, a Transitions Coach works directly with patients and family members for 30 days after discharge to help them understand and manage their complex postdischarge needs, ensuring continuity of care across settings. Participants in the program have a 20 to 40 percent lower hospital readmission rate at 30, 90, and 180 days postdischarge.

== Turfing ==
Turfing is where a healthcare provider transfers a patient they could have taken care of to another provider in order to reduce their own patient load. According to one study in the US, nine percent of physicians admitted that they had transferred a patient in such manner.

== See also ==
- System of concepts to support continuity of care
- GP Liaison
