= Health regions of Canada =

Government organizations in Canada

Health regions, also called health authorities, are a governance model used by Canada's provincial and territorial governments to administer and deliver public health care to all Canadian residents.

Health care is designated a provincial responsibility under the separation of powers in Canada's federal system. Most health regions or health authorities are organized along geographic boundaries, however, some are organized along operational lines.

== Atlantic region ==
=== New Brunswick ===
- Vitalité Health Network
- Horizon Health Network

=== Newfoundland and Labrador ===
- Newfoundland and Labrador Health Services

=== Nova Scotia ===
- IWK Health Centre
- Nova Scotia Health Authority

=== Prince Edward Island ===
- Health PEI is the single health authority for the province.

== British Columbia ==
- Northern Health
- Interior Health
- Island Health
- Vancouver Coastal Health
- Fraser Health
- First Nations Health Authority (not regional)
- Provincial Health Services Authority (not regional – serves entire province)

== Ontario ==
- Erie St. Clair LHIN
- South West LHIN
- Waterloo Wellington LHIN
- Hamilton Niagara Haldimand Brant LHIN
- Central West LHIN
- Mississauga Halton LHIN
- Toronto Central LHIN
- Central LHIN
- Central East LHIN
- South East LHIN
- Champlain LHIN
- North Simcoe Muskoka LHIN
- North East LHIN
- North West LHIN

== Prairie region ==
=== Alberta ===
- Alberta Health Services is the single health authority for the province. It was created in 2008 from nine former regional health authorities (RHAs) plus the Alberta Mental Health Board, the Alberta Cancer Board, and the Alberta Alcohol and Drug Abuse Commission. The RHAs were in turn created in 1994, from the former hospital boards and local health units.

=== Manitoba ===
- Interlake-Eastern Regional Health Authority
- Northern Regional Health Authority
- Southern Health-Santé Sud
- Prairie Mountain Health
- Winnipeg Regional Health Authority

=== Saskatchewan ===
- Saskatchewan Health Authority is the single health authority of Saskatchewan as of December 4, 2017.

== Quebec ==
- Région de l'Abitibi-Témiscamingue
- Région de l'Estrie
- Région de l'Outaouais
- Région de la Capitale-Nationale
- Région de la Chaudière-Appalaches
- Région de la Côte-Nord
- Région de la Gaspésie-Îles-de-la-Madeleine
- Région de la Mauricie et du Centre-du-Québec
- Région de la Montérégie
- Région de Lanaudière
- Région de Laval
- Région de Montréal-Centre
- Région des Laurentides
- Région des Terres-Cries-de-la-Baie-James
- Région du Bas-Saint-Laurent
- Région du Nord-du-Québec
- Région du Nunavik
- Région du Saguenay – Lac-Saint-Jean

== Territories ==
=== Northwest Territories ===
- Beaufort-Delta HSS Authority
- Sahtu HSS Authority
- Deh Cho HSS Authority
- Tlicho HSS Authority
- Yellowknife HSS Authority
- Stanton Territorial Health Authority
- Hay River HSS Authority
- Fort Smith HSS Authority

=== Nunavut ===
- Nunavut Health Region

=== Yukon Territory ===
- Yukon Territory Health Region

== See also ==
- Health care in Canada
