= List of schools in Manitoba =

This is a list of schools in Manitoba.

== Public schools (K–12) ==
=== Northern school divisions ===
School divisions in Northern Manitoba include Flin Flon SD in Flin Flon, Kelsey SD in The Pas, and Mystery Lake SD in Thompson.

Division	School	Grades
Flin Flon	Ruth Betts School	K–8
Flin Flon	Hapnot Collegiate	9–12
Flin Flon	Many Faces Education Centre (alternative school)	9–12
Flin Flon	Ecolé McIsaac School	K–8
Mystery Lake	Burntwood Elementary School	K–8
Mystery Lake	Deerwood Elementary School	K–8
Mystery Lake	Juniper Elementary School	
Mystery Lake	R. D. Parker Collegiate	9–12
Mystery Lake	École Riverside School	
Mystery Lake	Wapanohk Community School	
Mystery Lake	Westwood Elementary School	K–8
Kelsey	École Opasquia School	K–5
Kelsey	École Scott Bateman Middle School	6–8
Kelsey	Margaret Barbour Collegiate Institute	9–12
Kelsey	Mary Duncan School	7–12
Kelsey	Kelsey Learning Centre (at UCN)	adult
Kelsey	Kelsey Community School	K–5

=== Brandon School Division ===
Brandon School Division serves the City of Brandon and area.

School	Grades
Alexander School (in Alexander)	K-8
Betty Gibson School	K-8
Crocus Plains Regional Secondary School	9-12
Earl Oxford School	K-8
George Fitton School	K-8
Green Acres School	K-8
École Harrison	K-8
J. R. Reid School	K-8
King George School	K-8
Kirkcaldy Heights School	K-8
Linden Lanes School	K-8
Maryland Park School	K-8
Meadows School	K-8
École Secondaire Neelin High School	9-12
École New Era School	K-8
École O'Kelly School (CFB Shilo)	K-8
Prairie Hope High School	9-12
Riverheights School	K-8
Riverview School	K-8
St. Augustine School	K-8
Spring Valley Colony School (Hutterite)	K-12
Valleyview Centennial School	K-8
Vincent Massey High School	9-12
Waverly Park School	K-8

=== Hanover ===
Hanover School Division serves communities in southeastern Manitoba, including the RM of Hanover, City of Steinbach, Town of Niverville, and Landmark in the RM of Taché.

School	Grades	Location
Blumenort School	K–9	Blumenort
Bothwell School	K–9	New Bothwell
Clearspring Middle School	5–8	Steinbach
Crystal Spring	K–12	Ste. Agathe
Elmdale Elementary School	K–4	Steinbach
Green Valley School	5–12	Grunthal
Kleefeld School	K–8	Kleefeld
Landmark Collegiate	7–12	Landmark
Landmark Elementary	K–6	Landmark
Mitchell Elementary	K–4	Mitchell
Mitchell Middle	5–8	Mitchell
Niverville Elementary	K–5	Niverville
Niverville High School	9–12	Niverville
Niverville Middle School	5–8	Niverville
South Oaks School	K–4	Grunthal
Southwood Elementary School	K–4	Steinbach
Stonybrook Middle School	5–8	Steinbach
Steinbach Regional Secondary School	9–12	Steinbach
Woodlawn School	K–4	Steinbach

=== Louis Riel School Division ===
LRSD serves the communities of St. Boniface and St. Vital in Winnipeg.

School	Grades
Archwood School	K–8
Collège Béliveau	9–12
Dakota Collegiate	9–12
Darwin School	K–8
Dr. D. W. Penner School	K–6
Frontenac School	K–8
General Vanier School	K–8
École George McDowell	6–8
Glenlawn Collegiate	9–12
Glenwood School	K–8
École Guyot	K–6
H. S. Paul School	K–8
Hastings School	K–8
École Henri-Bergeron	K–6
Highbury School	K–8
École Howden	K–6
Island Lakes Community School	K–8
J. H. Bruns Collegiate	9–12
Collège Jeanne-Sauvé	9–12
École Julie-Riel	K–5
Lavallee School	K–8
Louis Riel Arts and Technology Centre	12
École Marie-Anne-Gaboury	K–8
Marion School	K–8
Minnetonka School	K–8
Nelson McIntyre Collegiate	9–12
Niakwa Place School	K–8
Nordale School	K–8
École Provencher	K–8
École Sage Creek School	K–8
Samuel Burland School	K–8
Shamrock School	K–8
St. George School	K–8
École St. Germain	K–5
École Van Belleghem	K–6
École Varennes	K–8
Victor H. L. Wyatt School	K–8
Victor Mager School	K–8
Windsor Park Collegiate	9–12
Windsor School	K–8

=== Pembina Trails ===
Pembina Trails SD serves the communities of Assiniboine South and Fort Garry in Winnipeg.

School	Grades
Acadia Junior High School	7–9
Arthur A. Leach School	5–9
Bairdmore School	K–6
Beaumont School	K–5
Beaverlodge School	K–5
Chancellor School	K–6
École Charleswood School	6–8 (English) 5–8 (French)
École Crane	K–4
Dalhousie School	K–6
École Dieppe	K–4
Fort Richmond Collegiate	10–12
General Byng School	K–9
Henry G. Izatt Middle School	5–9
Laidlaw School	K–8
Linden Meadows School	K–8
École secondaire Oak Park High School	9–12
Oakenwald School	K–6
Pacific Junction School	K–5
Pembina Trails Alternative High School	11–12
Pembina Trails Early College (PTEC)	9–12
École R.H.G. Bonnycastle School	K–4
Ralph Maybank School	K–6
River West Park School	K–8
Royal School	K–5
Ryerson School	K–6
Shaftesbury High School	9–12
École South Pointe School	K–8
École St-Avila	K–6
École Tuxedo Park	K–4
École Van Walleghem School	K–8
Institut collégial Vincent Massey Collegiate	9–12 (French) 10–12 (English)
École Viscount Alexander	5–8
Westdale School	6–8
Westgrove School	K–5
Whyte Ridge School	K–4

=== River East Transcona ===
River East Transcona SD serves the communities of River East (North and East Kildonan), and Transcona in Winnipeg, as well as the RM of East St. Paul.

School	Grades
Angus McKay School	K–5
Bertrun E. Glavin School	K–5
Bird's Hill School	K–5
École Centrale	K–5
Donwood School	K–5
Dr. F.W.L. Hamilton School	K–5
Emerson School	K–5
Hampstead School	K–5
Harold Hatcher School	K–5
John de Graff School	K–5
Joseph Teres School	K–5
Lord Wolseley School	K–5
Maple Leaf School	K–5
École Margaret-Underhill	K–5
École Neil Campbell School	K–5
Polson School	K–5
Prince Edward School	K–5
Princess Margaret School	K–5
Radisson School	K–5
Sherwood School	K–5
École Springfield Heights School	K–5
École Sun Valley School	K–5
Wayoata School	K–5
Westview School	K–5
Arthur Day Middle School	6–8
Chief Peguis Middle School	6–8
École John Henderson Middle School	6–8
John W. Gunn Middle School	6–8
École Munroe Middle School	6–8
École Regent Park	6–8
Robert Andrews Middle School	6–8
Valley Gardens Middle School	6–8
Bernie Wolfe School	K–8
John Pritchard School	K–8
École Salisbury Morse Place School	K–8
Kildonan-East Collegiate	9–12
Collège Miles Macdonell Collegiate	9–12
Murdoch MacKay Collegiate	9–12
Collège Pierre-Elliott-Trudeau	9–12
River East Collegiate	9–12
Transcona Collegiate	9–12

=== Seven Oaks ===
Seven Oaks SD serves the community of Seven Oaks in Winnipeg, as well as the RM of West St. Paul.

School	Grades
École Belmont	K–5
Collicutt School	K–5
École Constable Edward Finney School	K–5
Forest Park School	K–5
Governor Semple School	K–5
James Nisbet Community School	K–5
Margaret Park School	K–5
Школа R.F. Morrison School	K–5
Riverbend Community School	K–5
École Rivière-Rouge	K–5
École Templeton	K–5
Victory School	K–5
Edmund Partridge Community School	6–8
H.C. Avery Middle School	6–8
École Leila North Community School	6–8
École Seven Oaks Middle School	6–8
A.E. Wright Community School	K–8
Amber Trails School	K–8
Elwick Community School	K–8
O.V. Jewitt Community School	K–8
West St. Paul School	K–8
Collège Garden City Collegiate	9–12
Maples Collegiate: Maples Met School	9–12
Seven Oaks Met School	9–12
West Kildonan Collegiate	9–12

=== St. James-Assiniboia ===
Seven Oaks SD serves the community of St. James-Assiniboia in Winnipeg.

School	Grades
École Assiniboine	K–5
Athlone School	K–5
École Bannatyne	K–5
Brooklands School	K–5
Buchanan School	K–5
Crestview School	K–5
Heritage School	K–5
Lakewood School	K–5
Linwood School	K–5
Phoenix School	K–5
École Robert Browning	K–5
Sansome School	K–5
Stevenson-Britannia School	K–5
Strathmillan School	K–5
École Voyageur	K–5
Bruce Middle School	6–8
George Waters Middle School	6–8
Golden Gate Middle School	6–8
Hedges Middle School	6–8
Lincoln Middle School	6–8
École Ness	6–8
Jameswood Alternative School	9–12
John Taylor Collegiate	9–12
St. James Collegiate	9–12
Collège Sturgeon Heights Collegiate	9–12
Westwood Collegiate	9–12

=== Division Scolaire Franco-Manitobaine ===
Division Scolaire Franco-Manitobaine (Franco-Manitoban School Division) has French-language schools distributed across the regions in Manitoba: Île-des-Chênes, La Broquerie, Laurier, Lorette, Notre-Dame-de-Lourdes, St. Claude, St. Georges, St. Jean Baptiste, St. Laurent, St. Lazare, St. Norbert, St-Pierre-Jolys, Ste. Agathe, Ste. Anne, Shilo, Thompson, and Winnipeg.

School	Location	Grades
École Lacerte	Winnipeg	K–8
École Précieux-Sang	Winnipeg	K–8
École Roméo-Dallaire	Winnipeg	K–8
École Taché	Winnipeg	K–8
Centre scolaire Léo-Rémillard	Winnipeg	9–12
Collège Louis-Riel	Winnipeg	7–12
École communautaire Aurèle-Lemoine	Saint-Laurent	K–12
École Christine-Lespérance	Winnipeg	K–8
École/Collège régional Gabrielle-Roy	Île-des-Chênes	K–12
École communautaire Gilbert-Rosset	Saint-Claude	K–12
École Jours de Plaine	Laurier	K–12
École La Source	Shilo	K–12
École communautaire La Voie du Nord	Thompson	K–8
École Lacerte	Winnipeg	K–8
École Lagimodière	Lorette	K–8
École Noël-Ritchot	Winnipeg	K–8
École régional Notre-Dame	Notre-Dame-de-Lourdes	K–12
École Pointe-des-Chênes	Sainte-Anne-des-Chênes	K–12
École Précieux-Sang	Winnipeg	K–8
École communautaire Réal-Bérard	Saint-Pierre-Jolys	K–12
École Roméo-Dallaire	Winnipeg	K–9
École Sainte-Agathe	Sainte-Agathe	K–9
École communautaire Saint-Georges	Saint-Georges	K–12
École régionale Saint-Jean-Baptiste	Saint-Jean-Baptiste	K–12
École Saint-Joachim	La Broquerie	K–12
École Saint-Lazare	Saint-Lazare	K–12
École Taché	Winnipeg	K–6

=== Winnipeg School Division ===
Winnipeg SD serves the communities of Winnipeg Centre (Downtown, Point Douglas) and River Heights in Winnipeg.

School	Grades
Stanley Knowles School	K–5
Garden Grove	K–8
Greenway School	K–6
Children of the Earth	9–12
Daniel McIntyre Collegiate Institute	9–12
Gordon Bell High School	7–12
Kelvin High School	9–12
R.B. Russell Vocational High School	9–12
Sisler High School	9–12
Technical Vocational High School	9–12
Winnipeg Adult Education Centre	12

== Private schools (K–12) ==
School	Location	Type	Grades
Balmoral Hall School	Winnipeg	All-girls school	
Beautiful Savior Lutheran School	Winnipeg		
Calvin Christian Collegiate	Winnipeg		
Casa Montessori and Orff School	Winnipeg		
Christ the King School	Winnipeg		
Faith Academy	Winnipeg		
Freedom International School	Winnipeg		
Gray Academy of Jewish Education	Winnipeg		
Holy Ghost School	Winnipeg		
Hosanna Christian School	Winnipeg		
I. L. Peretz Folk School	Winnipeg		
Immanuel Christian School	Winnipeg		
The King's School	Winnipeg		
Lake St. Martin School (Winnipeg Campus)	Winnipeg	First Nations school	
Linden Christian School	Winnipeg		
Mennonite Brethren Collegiate Institute (MBCI)	Winnipeg		5-12
Ohr HaTorah Day School	Winnipeg		
Our Lady of Victory School	Winnipeg		
Paradise Montessori School	Winnipeg		
Red River Valley Junior Academy	Winnipeg		
Shawenim Abinooji School	Winnipeg		
Southeast Collegiate	Winnipeg	First Nations school	
Springs Christian Academy	Winnipeg		
St. Alphonsus School	Winnipeg		
St. Boniface Diocesan High School	Winnipeg		
St. Charles Catholic School	Winnipeg		
St. Emile Catholic School	Winnipeg		
St. Gerard School	Winnipeg		
St. Ignatius School	Winnipeg	Catholic	
St. John Brebeuf School	Winnipeg		
St. John's-Ravenscourt School	Winnipeg		
St. Mary's Academy	Winnipeg		
St. Maurice School	Winnipeg		
St. Paul's High School	Winnipeg		
Twelve Tribes School	Winnipeg		
University of Winnipeg Collegiate	Winnipeg		9-12
Westgate Mennonite Collegiate	Winnipeg		
Winnipeg Mennonite Elementary & Middle Schools	Winnipeg		
Winnipeg Montessori School Inc.	Winnipeg		

== Post-secondary institutions ==
The provincial Department of Advanced Education and Training is responsible for Manitoba's post-secondary system.

=== Public post-secondary ===
- Assiniboine Community College — Its main two campuses (Victoria Avenue East and the North Hill) are located in Brandon, with one satellite campus in Dauphin (Parkland Campus).
- Brandon University — Located in Brandon.
- Red River College Polytechnic — Its main two campuses (Notre Dame and Exchange District) are located in Winnipeg, along with an aviation and aerospace campus (Stevenson Campus) located in both Winnipeg (Airport) and Southport, and several regional campuses, in Selkirk (Interlake and Peguis - Fisher River Campus), Portage la Prairie, Steinbach, and Winkler.
- Université de Saint-Boniface — Located in St. Boniface, Winnipeg.
  - École technique et professionnelle
- University College of the North — Its main two campuses are located in The Pas and Thompson, respectively, and serve Northern Manitoba.
- University of Manitoba — Its main campus (Fort Garry) and downtown health-sciences campus (Bannatyne) are located in Winnipeg.
  - St. Andrew's College
  - St. John's College
  - St. Paul's College
- University of Winnipeg — Located in Downtown Winnipeg
  - Manitoba College (defunct)
  - Wesley College (defunct)
- Manitoba Institute of Trades and Technology — Located in Winnipeg.
- Yellowquill College

=== Private post-secondary ===
- Aveda Institute Winnipeg
- Booth University College
- Canadian Mennonite University
  - Menno Simons College
  - Redekop School of Business
- I. L. Peretz Folk School (defunct)
- Manitoba Emergency Services College
- Mid-Ocean School of Media Arts (MOSMA)
- Providence University College and Theological Seminary
- Robertson College
- Steinbach Bible College

== Defunct schools ==
- I. L. Peretz Folk School
- Manitoba College
- Ohr HaTorah Day School
- Red River Academy
- Saint John's Cathedral Boys' School
- Wesley College

Residential schools

- Assiniboia Indian Residential School
- Birtle Indian Residential School
- Brandon Indian Residential School
- St. Boniface Industrial School
