= List of schools in Winnipeg =

This is a list of schools and private vocational institutions or career colleges in Winnipeg, Manitoba.

== Winnipeg school divisions ==
- Louis Riel School Division
- Pembina Trails School Division
- River East Transcona School Division
- Seven Oaks School Division
- St. James-Assiniboia School Division
- Winnipeg School Division
- Division Scolaire Franco-Manitobaine (Manitoba-wide division)

== Post-secondary institutions ==
The provincial Department of Economic Development and Jobs is responsible for financial oversight, policy development, and accountability in Manitoba's post-secondary system, which includes post-secondary institutions in Winnipeg. The Department provides oversight to the province’s public post-secondary institutions, as well as providing grants to private religious institutions.

=== Public ===
- Canadian Mennonite University
  - Menno Simons College
  - Redekop School of Business
- Red River College Polytechnic
- Université de Saint-Boniface
  - École technique et professionnelle
- University of Manitoba
  - St. Andrew's College
  - St. John's College
  - St. Paul's College
- University of Winnipeg
  - Manitoba College
  - Menno Simons College
- Manitoba Institute of Trades & Technology

=== Private ===
Private religious institutions in Winnipeg include:

- Booth University College
- Providence University College and Theological Seminary

Private vocational institutions in Winnipeg, as of February 2021
Program	Institution
Various (business, health, technology, research etc.)	Academy of Learning (2 campuses)
Various (business, health, technology, research etc.)	Nations College of Canada (NCC)
Various (business, health, technology, research etc.)	CDI College of Business, Technology and Health Care
Various (business, health, technology, research etc.)	Commonwealth College
Various (business, health, technology, research etc.)	Herzing College
Various (business, health, technology, research etc.)	Louis Riel Vocational College (2 campuses)
Science Insight Academy (by IMAQ Technologies)
Robertson College
Administration and accounting	Anokiiwin Training Institute
Administration and accounting	Willis College
Driver training	Arnold Bros. Transportation Academy
Driver training	Buffalo Driver Training
Driver training	First Class Training Centre
Driver training	KMS Transport Driving Academy
Driver training	Perfect One Driving School
Driver training	Professional Transport Driver Training School
Beauty	Aveda Institute Winnipeg
Beauty	Eternal Beauty Institute
Beauty	H & Co. Academy Hair and Nails Inc.
Beauty	M. C. College
Beauty	The Salon Professional Academy
Blue collar	Code of Excellence Training Center Local 2085
Blue collar	Industry Specific Training of Manitoba
Blue collar	Manitoba Heavy Construction Training Academy
Blue collar	Operating Engineers Training Institute of Manitoba
Carpentry	Prairie Arctic Trades Training Centre
Healthcare and therapy	CHN College
Healthcare and therapy	Criti Care EMS
Healthcare and therapy	Southern Manitoba Academy for Response Training (SMART)
Hospitality and culinary arts	Manitoba Tourism Education College (MTEC)
Hospitality and culinary arts	Winnipeg Global Education College
Media	Mid-Ocean School of Media Arts (MOSMA)
Law and safety	Northwest Law Enforcement Academy
Therapy	Evolve College of Massage Therapy
Therapy	Hua Xia Acupuncture, Massage, Herb College of Canada
Therapy	Marione's School of Learning
Therapy	Wellington College of Remedial Massage Therapies
Therapy	Winnipeg Holistic Expressive Arts Therapy Institute (WHEAT)

== Private schools (K–12) ==
- Balmoral Hall School
- Beautiful Savior Lutheran School
- Calvin Christian Collegiate
- Casa Montessori and Orff School
- Christ the King School
- Faith Academy
- Freedom International School
- Gray Academy of Jewish Education
- Holy Cross School
- Holy Ghost School
- Hosanna Christian School
- I. L. Peretz Folk School
- Immanuel Christian School
- The King's School
- Lake St. Martin School (Winnipeg Campus) – First Nations school
- Linden Christian School
- Mennonite Brethren Collegiate Institute (MBCI)
- Ohr HaTorah Day School
- Our Lady of Victory School
- Paradise Montessori School
- Prairie Central Adventist Academy
- Shawenim Abinooji School
- Southeast Collegiate – First Nations school
- Springs Christian Academy
- St. Alphonsus School
- St. Boniface Diocesan High School
- St. Charles Catholic School
- St. Emile Catholic School
- St. Gerard School
- St. Ignatius School
- St. John Brebeuf School
- St. John's-Ravenscourt School
- St. Mary's Academy
- St. Maurice School
- St. Paul's High School
- Twelve Tribes School
- University of Winnipeg Collegiate
- Westgate Mennonite Collegiate
- Winnipeg Mennonite Elementary & Middle Schools
- Winnipeg Montessori School Inc.

== Public schools (K–12) ==
=== Early years and middle school ===
Early years (kindergarten – gr 5)
Division	School
St. James-Assiniboia	École Assiniboine
St. James-Assiniboia	Athlone School
River East Transcona	Angus McKay School
Seven Oaks	École Belmont
St. James-Assiniboia	École Bannatyne
River East Transcona	Bertrun E. Glavin School
Pembina Trails	Beaumont School
Pembina Trails	Beaverlodge School
River East Transcona	Bird's Hill School
St. James-Assiniboia	Brooklands School
St. James-Assiniboia	Buchanan School
River East Transcona	École Centrale
Seven Oaks	Collicutt School
Seven Oaks	École Constable Edward Finney School
St. James-Assiniboia	Crestview School
River East Transcona	Donwood School
River East Transcona	Dr. F.W.L. Hamilton School
River East Transcona	Emerson School
Seven Oaks	Forest Park School
Seven Oaks	Governor Semple School
River East Transcona	Hampstead School
River East Transcona	Harold Hatcher School
St. James-Assiniboia	Heritage School
Seven Oaks	James Nisbet Community School
River East Transcona	John de Graff School
River East Transcona	Joseph Teres School
Louis Riel	École Julie-Riel
St. James-Assiniboia	Lakewood School
St. James-Assiniboia	Linwood School
River East Transcona	Lord Wolseley School
River East Transcona	Maple Leaf School
Seven Oaks	Margaret Park School
River East Transcona	École Margaret-Underhill
River East Transcona	École Neil Campbell School
Pembina Trails	Pacific Junction School
St. James-Assiniboia	Phoenix School
River East Transcona	Polson School
River East Transcona	Prince Edward School
River East Transcona	Princess Margaret School
Seven Oaks	Школа R.F. Morrison School
River East Transcona	Radisson School
Seven Oaks	Riverbend Community School
Seven Oaks	École Rivière-Rouge
St. James-Assiniboia	École Robert Browning
Pembina Trails	Royal School
St. James-Assiniboia	Sansome School
River East Transcona	Sherwood School
River East Transcona	École Springfield Heights School
Louis Riel	École St. Germain
Winnipeg	Stanley Knowles School
St. James-Assiniboia	Stevenson-Britannia School
St. James-Assiniboia	Strathmillan School
River East Transcona	École Sun Valley School
Seven Oaks	École Templeton
Seven Oaks	Victory School
St. James-Assiniboia	École Voyageur
Pembina Trails	Westgrove School
River East Transcona	Wayoata School
River East Transcona	Westview School

Middle school (grades 6–8)
Division	School
River East Transcona	Arthur Day Middle School
St. James-Assiniboia	Bruce Middle School
Pembina Trails	École Charleswood School (English)
River East Transcona	Chief Peguis Middle School
Seven Oaks	Edmund Partridge Community School
St. James-Assiniboia	George Waters Middle School
St. James-Assiniboia	Golden Gate Middle School
Louis Riel	École George McDowell
St. James-Assiniboia	Hedges Middle School
Seven Oaks	H.C. Avery Middle School
River East Transcona	École John Henderson Middle School
River East Transcona	John W. Gunn Middle School
Seven Oaks	École Leila North Community School
St. James-Assiniboia	Lincoln Middle School
River East Transcona	École Munroe Middle School
St. James-Assiniboia	École Ness
River East Transcona	École Regent Park
River East Transcona	Robert Andrews Middle School
Seven Oaks	École Seven Oaks Middle School
River East Transcona	Valley Gardens Middle School
Pembina Trails	Westdale School

=== Mixed grades ===
Early/Middle years (kindergarten – gr 8)
Division	School
Seven Oaks	A.E. Wright Community School
Seven Oaks	Amber Trails School
Louis Riel	Archwood School
River East Transcona	Bernie Wolfe School
Franco-Manitobaine	École Christine-Lespérance
Louis Riel	Darwin School
Seven Oaks	Elwick Community School
Louis Riel	Frontenac School
Winnipeg	Garden Grove
Louis Riel	General Vanier School
Louis Riel	Glenwood School
Louis Riel	H. S. Paul School
Louis Riel	Hastings School
Louis Riel	Highbury School
Louis Riel	Island Lakes Community School
River East Transcona	John Pritchard School
Franco-Manitobaine	École Lacerte
Pembina Trails	Laidlaw School
Louis Riel	Lavallee School
Pembina Trails	Linden Meadows School
Louis Riel	École Marie-Anne-Gaboury
Louis Riel	Marion School
Louis Riel	Minnetonka School
Louis Riel	Niakwa Place School
Louis Riel	Nordale School
Seven Oaks	O.V. Jewitt Community School
Franco-Manitobaine	École Précieux-Sang
Louis Riel	École Provencher
Pembina Trails	River West Park School
Franco-Manitobaine	École Roméo-Dallaire
Louis Riel	École Sage Creek School
River East Transcona	École Salisbury Morse Place School
Louis Riel	Samuel Burland School
Louis Riel	Shamrock School
Pembina Trails	École South Pointe School
Louis Riel	St. George School
Franco-Manitobaine	École Taché
Pembina Trails	École Van Walleghem School
Seven Oaks	West St. Paul School
Louis Riel	Windsor School
Louis Riel	École Varennes
Louis Riel	Victor H. L. Wyatt School
Louis Riel	Victor Mager School

Mixed early/middle/senior years (kindergarten – grade 9)
Division	School	Grades
Pembina Trails	Acadia Junior High School	7–9
Pembina Trails	Arthur A. Leach School	5–9
Pembina Trails	Bairdmore School	K–6
Pembina Trails	Chancellor School	K–6
Pembina Trails	École Charleswood School	6–8 (English) 5–8 (French)
Pembina Trails	École Crane	K–4
Pembina Trails	Dalhousie School	K–6
Pembina Trails	École Dieppe	K–4
Louis Riel	Dr. D. W. Penner School	K–6
Pembina Trails	General Byng School	K–9
Winnipeg	Greenway School	K–6
Louis Riel	École Guyot	K–6
Louis Riel	École Henri-Bergeron	K–6
Louis Riel	École Henri-Bergeron	K–6
Pembina Trails	Henry G. Izatt Middle School	5–9
Louis Riel	École Howden	K–6
Franco-Manitobaine	Collège Louis-Riel	7–12
Franco-Manitobaine	École Nord-Est	K–1
Pembina Trails	Oakenwald School	K–6
Pembina Trails	Ralph Maybank School	K–6
Pembina Trails	École R.H.G. Bonnycastle School	K–4
Pembina Trails	Ryerson School	K–6
Pembina Trails	École St-Avila	K–6
Pembina Trails	École Tuxedo Park	K–4
Louis Riel	École Van Belleghem	K–6
Pembina Trails	École Viscount Alexander	5–8
Pembina Trails	Whyte Ridge School	K–4

=== Secondary schools ===
High school
Division	School	Grades
Franco-Manitobaine	Centre scolaire Léo-Rémillard	9–12
Louis Riel	Collège Béliveau	9–12
Winnipeg	Children of the Earth	9–12
Winnipeg	Daniel McIntyre Collegiate Institute	9–12
Louis Riel	Dakota Collegiate	9–12
Pembina Trails	Fort Richmond Collegiate	10–12
Seven Oaks	Collège Garden City Collegiate	9–12
Louis Riel	Glenlawn Collegiate	9–12
Winnipeg	Gordon Bell High School	7–12
St. James-Assiniboia	Jameswood Alternative School	9–12
Louis Riel	Collège Jeanne-Sauvé	9–12
Louis Riel	J. H. Bruns Collegiate	9–12
St. James-Assiniboia	John Taylor Collegiate	9–12
Winnipeg	Kelvin High School	9–12
River East Transcona	Kildonan-East Collegiate	9–12
Louis Riel	Louis Riel Arts and Technology Centre	12
Seven Oaks	Maples Collegiate: Maples Met School	9–12
River East Transcona	Collège Miles Macdonell Collegiate	9–12
River East Transcona	Murdoch MacKay Collegiate	9–12
Louis Riel	Nelson McIntyre Collegiate	9–12
Pembina Trails	École secondaire Oak Park High School	9–12
Pembina Trails	Pembina Trails Alternative High School	11–12
Pembina Trails	Pembina Trails Early College (PTEC)	9–12
River East Transcona	Collège Pierre-Elliott-Trudeau	9–12
Winnipeg	R.B. Russell Vocational High School	9–12
River East Transcona	River East Collegiate	9–12
Pembina Trails	Shaftesbury High School	9–12
Winnipeg	Sisler High School	9–12
Seven Oaks	Seven Oaks Met School	9–12
St. James-Assiniboia	St. James Collegiate	9–12
St. James-Assiniboia	Collège Sturgeon Heights Collegiate	9–12
Winnipeg	Technical Vocational High School	9–12
River East Transcona	Transcona Collegiate	9–12
Pembina Trails	Institut collégial Vincent Massey Collegiate	9–12 (French) 10–12 (English)
Seven Oaks	West Kildonan Collegiate	9–12
St. James-Assiniboia	Westwood Collegiate	9–12
Louis Riel	Windsor Park Collegiate	9–12
Winnipeg	Winnipeg Adult Education Centre	12
