= Ohr HaTorah =

Ohr HaTorah may refer to:

- A book by Rabbi Menachem Mendel Schneersohn
- Ohr HaTorah Day School - A former Orthodox Jewish day school in Winnipeg
- A non-affiliated synagogue in Los Angeles, California, led by Rabbi Mordecai Finley.
- A non-affiliated synagogue in North Druid Hills, Georgia.
