= Immanuel Christian School =

Immanuel Christian School may refer to:

- Immanuel Christian School, New Zealand, in Auckland
- Immanuel Christian School (Winnipeg), Manitoba, Canada
- Immanuel Christian School (Springfield), Virginia, United States
