= LRSD =

LRSD may refer to:

- Little Rock School District
- Louis Riel School Division
