= St Boniface High School =

St Boniface High School may refer to:

- St. Boniface High School (Kimberley, South Africa), a school in Kimberly, Northern Cape, South Africa.
- St. Boniface Diocesan High School, a high school in Winnipeg, Manitoba, Canada.
- St. Boniface High School (Nagaon, Assam, India), a school in Nagaon, Assam, India.

== See also ==
- St Boniface College, a secondary school in Kavango Region, Namibia.
- St Boniface's Catholic College, a Catholic secondary school in Plymouth, England.
