= Ralph Parker =

Ralph Parker may refer to:

- Ralph D. Parker (1898–1983), Canadian miner
- Ralph J. Parker (1867–1922), Minnesota politician
