= CSLR =

CSLR may refer to:

- Centre scolaire Léo-Rémillard - a French high school situated south of Winnipeg, Manitoba, Canada
- City and South London Railway - the first deep-level underground "tube" railway in the world
