= Yaacov Benamou =

Orthodox Jewish Rabbi

Rabbi Yaacov Benamou

Personal life
- Born: Morocco
- Occupation: Rabbi, educator, outreach director

Religious life
- Religion: Judaism
- Denomination: Orthodox Judaism

Jewish leader
- Position: Founder and director
- Organisation: Jewish Rockville Outreach Center (JewishROC)
- Began: 2006
- Other: Senior Rabbi, Herzlia-Adas Yeshurun Synagogue; Founding Principal, Ohr HaTorah Day School

Rabbi Yaacov Benamou is a Moroccan-born Orthodox rabbi who founded the Jewish Rockville Outreach Center, commonly known as JewishROC, in Rockville, Maryland, in 2006.

== Early life and Israel ==
Benamou was born in Morocco. He lived primarily in Netivot, Israel from age 14 to age 28 and served as a soldier in the Israel Defense Forces during the 1982 Lebanon War. According to an interview published in The Jewish Vues, Benamou studied under the Baba Sali at the age of 15 before later emigrating from Israel.

== Rabbinical career ==
Before founding JewishROC, Benamou served as senior rabbi of Herzlia-Adas Yeshurun Synagogue in Winnipeg, Manitoba, Canada. In 1998, he became the founding principal of Ohr HaTorah Day School, an Orthodox Jewish day school in Winnipeg's River Heights neighbourhood. The school was hosted by Herzlia-Adas Yeshurun Synagogue. Benamou served as principal from 1998 to 2003.

In 2006, Benamou established JewishROC as an Orthodox outreach and adult education center in Rockville, Maryland. The organization describes its model as a hybrid of a congregational synagogue and an adult education center, with classes, services, Shabbat meals, holiday programs, and outreach programming for Jews from varied religious backgrounds.

In 2025, Washington Jewish Week reported that Benamou taught more than 10,000 students annually through JewishROC, including participants attending remotely.

== Public activity ==
Benamou was interviewed by Israel National News at the 2012 AIPAC Policy Conference. In 2019, he spoke at SHIN DC's fifth annual Mimouna festival at the Smithsonian National Museum of African Art, where he discussed the meaning of the Moroccan Jewish post-Passover festival.

== Teaching style ==
Benamou's teaching has been described as combining theoretical learning with practical observance in a community setting. Rabbi Barak Bader, later an assistant rabbi at JewishROC, described learning with Benamou several nights a week and wrote that Benamou connected Torah texts with history, science, archaeology, Jewish law, Midrash, Mussar, and Kabbalistic traditions in his classes.
