= Landon Rice =

Canadian gridiron football player (born 1988)

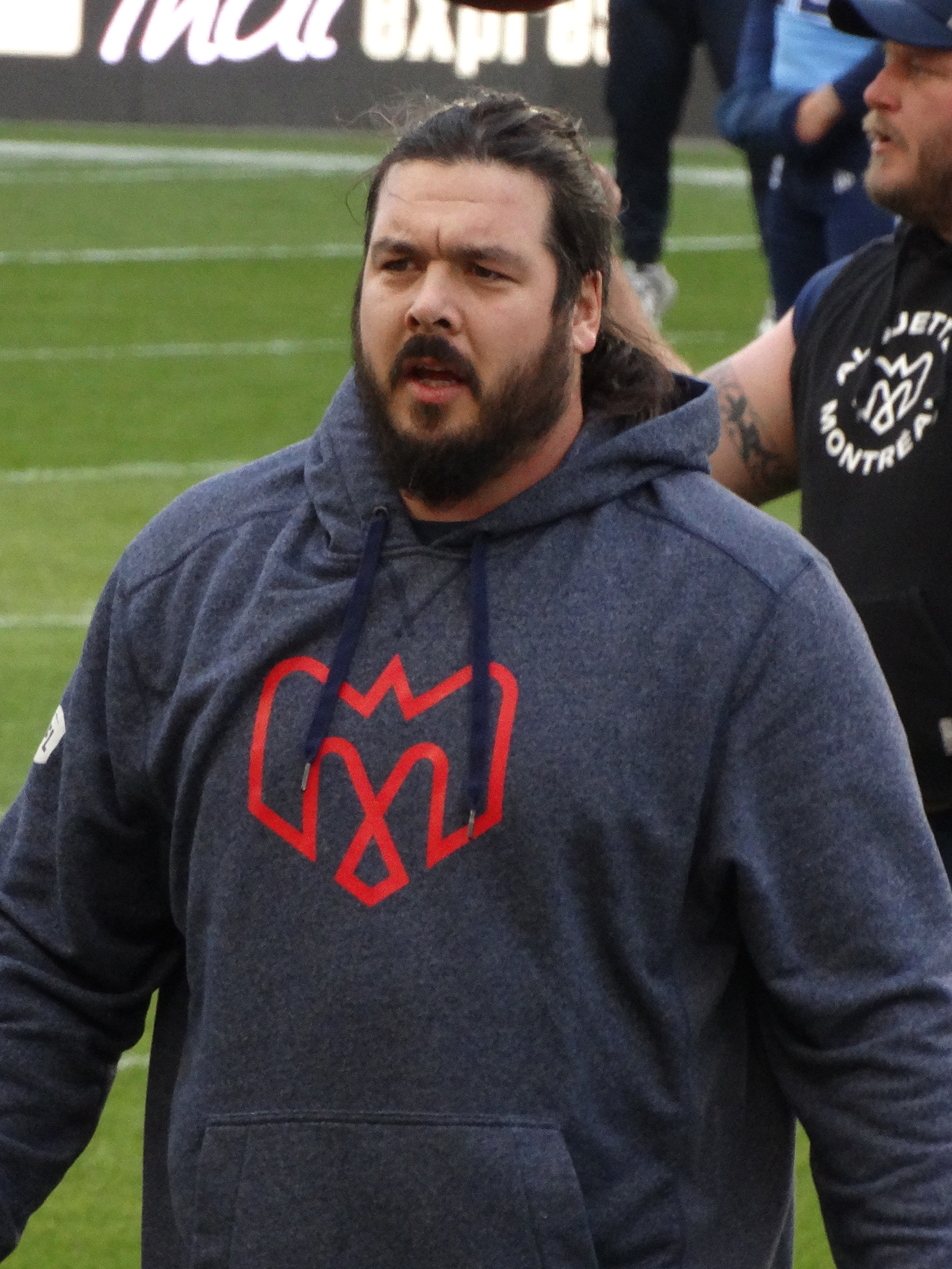
- Rice with the Montreal Alouettes in 2023

Profile
- Position: Offensive lineman

Personal information
- Born: February 28, 1988 (age 38); Brandon, Manitoba, Canada
- Listed height: 6 ft 6 in (1.98 m)
- Listed weight: 315 lb (143 kg)

Career information
- High school: Crocus Plains (Brandon)
- University: Manitoba

Career history
- 2013–2018: Hamilton Tiger-Cats
- 2018: Montreal Alouettes
- 2018: Hamilton Tiger-Cats
- 2019–2023: Montreal Alouettes
- 2024: Toronto Argonauts
- 2025: Montreal Alouettes

Awards and highlights
- 2× Grey Cup champion (2023, 2024); 2× CFL East All-Star (2021, 2022)
- Stats at CFL.ca

Landon Rice (born February 28, 1988) is a Canadian professional football offensive lineman. He most recently played for the Montreal Alouettes of the Canadian Football League (CFL). He is a two-time Grey Cup champion after winning with the Alouettes in 2023 and with the Toronto Argonauts in 2024. He played CIS football at the University of Manitoba.

== Early life ==
Rice played high school football at Crocus Plains Regional Secondary School in Brandon, Manitoba, as an offensive and defensive lineman on the 9-man football team. He won the Canada Cup in 2005 as a member of Team Manitoba.

== University career ==
Rice played for the Manitoba Bisons from 2007 to 2012. The Bisons won the 43rd Vanier Cup in 2007. He participated in the 2008 CIS East-West Bowl. Rice was named a team captain in 2011 and 2012. During his draft eligible year, Rice broke his ankle which impacted his draft status.

== Professional career ==
=== Hamilton Tiger-Cats (first stint) ===
Rice signed with the Hamilton Tiger-Cats on April 2, 2013, as an undrafted free agent and spent that season on the practice roster. He made his CFL debut on June 29, 2014, and made his first career start on July 4, 2014. He played in 18 regular season games in 2014 and started in three. He also played in both post-season games, including his first Grey Cup appearance, which was a loss to the Calgary Stampeders in the 102nd Grey Cup game.

=== Montreal Alouettes (first stint) ===
On July 22, 2018, Rice was traded with teammate Tony Washington to the Montreal Alouettes in the blockbuster Johnny Manziel deal. He played in four games with the Alouettes, including two starts at right guard, before being released on August 23, 2018.

=== Hamilton Tiger-Cats (second stint) ===
Rice was then signed by the Tiger-Cats again on August 28, 2018. He played in 14 regular season games, including one start, for the Tiger-Cats. He became a free agent during the following off-season.

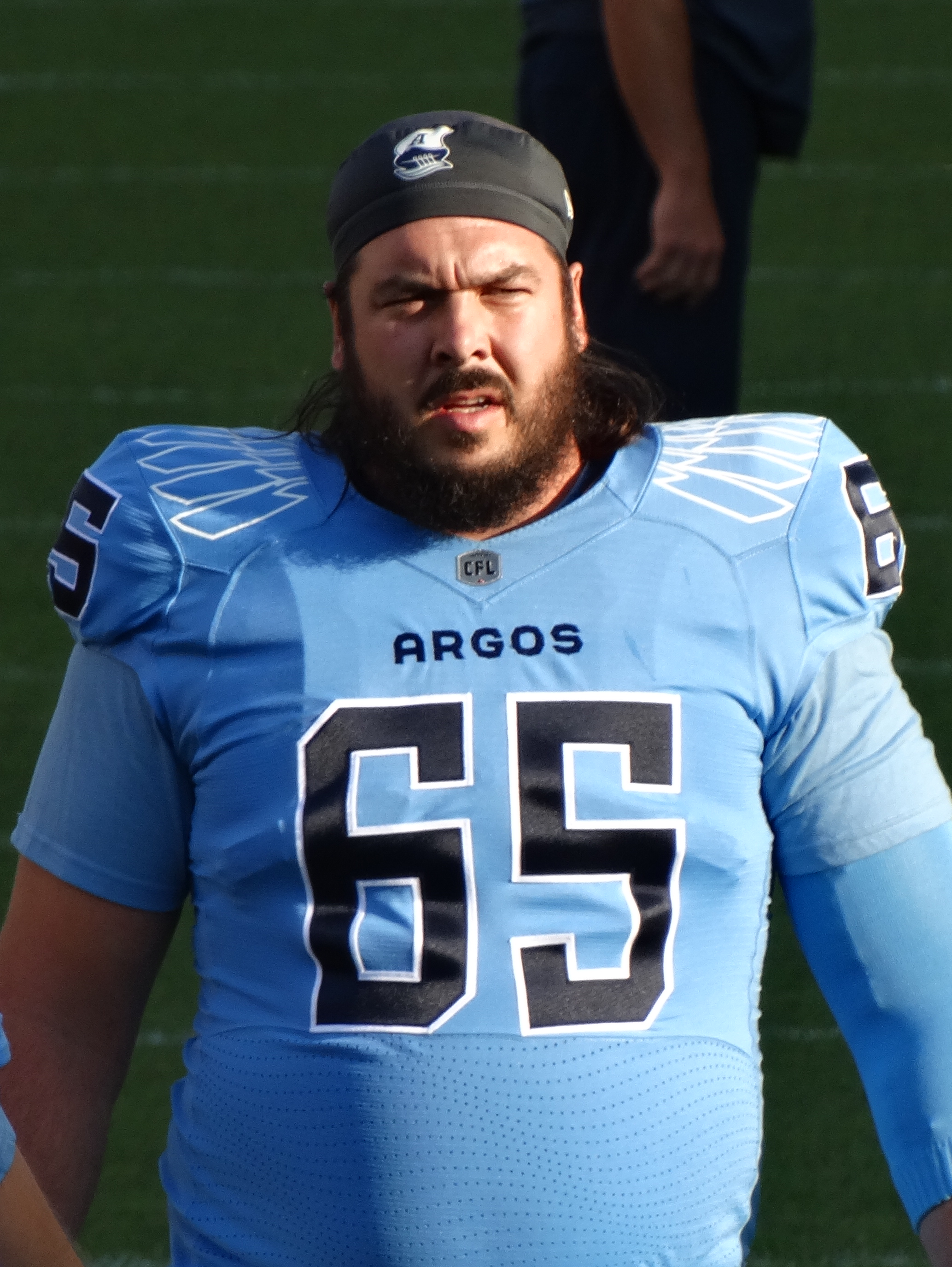
Rice with the Toronto Argonauts in 2024

=== Montreal Alouettes (second stint) ===
On July 27, 2019, Rice re-signed with the Alouettes to a one-year contract. He played in just nine regular season games in 2019, starting in two, but also started in his first post-season game in the East Semi-Final loss to the Edmonton Eskimos. He did not play in 2020 due to the cancellation of the 2020 CFL season. Rice then re-signed with the team again on December 16, 2020.

In 2021, Rice played and started in every regular season game (albeit in a shortened 14-game season) for the first time in his career, becoming a regular starter on the offensive line. He was also named a CFL East All-Star for the first time in his career. In the following year, Rice played in all 18 regular season games, starting in 17, but did not play in the post-season due to injury. He earned his second consecutive CFL East All-Star award and was also the team's nominee for the CFL's Most Outstanding Offensive Lineman Award and the Jake Gaudaur Veterans' Trophy.

Rice started the first nine games of the 2023 season before suffering a neck injury on August 19, 2023, against the Ottawa Redblacks. After spending most of the remaining season on the injured list, Rice returned in the regular season finale as a backup offensive lineman. He remained a backup in the team's two playoff games, but was named a starter for the 109th Grey Cup game. In his second appearance in a Grey Cup, Rice and the Alouettes defeated the Winnipeg Blue Bombers and he won his first CFL championship. In the following offseason, he became a free agent on February 13, 2024.

=== Toronto Argonauts ===
After remaining unsigned through the start of the 2024 CFL season, it was announced that Rice had signed with the Toronto Argonauts on June 24, 2024. He made his Argonauts debut on June 28, 2024, as a backup offensive lineman, against his former team, the Alouettes. He dressed in 16 regular season games and started the final game of the season after the Argonauts had secured their playoff seeding. He dressed as a backup offensive lineman in all three post-season games, including the 111th Grey Cup where the Argonauts defeated the Winnipeg Blue Bombers 41–24. He became a free agent upon the expiry of his contract on February 11, 2025.

=== Montreal Alouettes (third stint) ===
On October 28, 2025, it was announced that Rice had re-signed with the Alouettes. He became a free agent upon the expiry of his contract on February 10, 2026.
