= Louis Riel School Division =

School division in Winnipeg, Manitoba

Louis Riel School Division Division Scolaire Louis-Riel

Location
- 900 St. Mary's Rd, Winnipeg, MB R2M 3R3

District information
- Motto: Thriving Learners ∞ Flourishing Communities
- Established: created: 1998; established: July 19, 2002
- Superintendent: Rhiannon Mann
- School board: Louis Riel School Board
- Chair of the board: Chris Sigurdson
- Schools: 41
- Budget: CA $273,805,146.00

Students and staff
- Students: 17,782 (2025)
- Teachers: 1,330

Other information
- elected trustees: Chipalo Simunyola; Chris Sigurdson; Cindy Turner; Ian Walker; Irene Nordheim; Pamela Kolochuk; Ryan Palmquist; Sandy Nemeth
- Website: www.lrsd.net

The Louis Riel School Division (LRSD; French: Division Scolaire Louis-Riel, DSL-R) is a school division in Winnipeg, Manitoba, offering English-language and French-immersion education to its students.

It was broadly formed in 1998 with the voluntary amalgamation of the Norwood and St. Boniface School Divisions. Following the 2001 announcement by the Minister of Education, Training and Youth to reduce Manitoba's school divisions from 54 to 37, the St. Vital School Division merged with St. Boniface in 2002, officially establishing the new Louis Riel School Division.

== List of schools ==
=== Elementary and K–8 schools ===
School	Language	Grades
Archwood School	English	K–8
Darwin School	English	K–8
Dr. D. W. Penner School	English	K–7
Frontenac School	English	K–8
General Vanier School	English	K–8
Glenwood School	English	K–8
École Guyot	French immersion	K–8
H. S. Paul School	English	K–8
Hastings School	English	K–8
Highbury School	English	K–8
École Howden	French immersion	K–8
Island Lakes Community School	English	K–8
École Julie-Riel	French immersion	K–5, 4–6 middle immersion
Lavallee School	English	K–8
École Marie-Anne-Gaboury	French immersion	K–8
Marion School	English	K–8
Minnetonka School	English	K–8
Niakwa Place School	English	K–8
Nordale School	English	K–8
École Provencher	French immersion	K–4
Samuel Burland School	English	K–8
Shamrock School	English	K–8
St. George School	English	K–6
École Sage Creek Bonavistsa	French immersion	K–8
École St. Germain	French immersion	K–5
Windsor School	English	K–8
École Van Belleghem	French immersion	K–8
École Varennes	French immersion	K–6
Victor H. L. Wyatt School	English	K–8
Victor Mager School	English	K–8
Nordale School	English	K–8
Sage Creek School	English	K–8

=== Middle and secondary schools ===
School	Language	Grades
Collège Béliveau	French immersion	7–12; 9–12 (functionally)
Collège Jeanne-Sauvé	French immersion	9–12
Dakota Collegiate	English	9–12
École George McDowell	French immersion	6–8
Glenlawn Collegiate	English	9–12
J. H. Bruns Collegiate	English	9–12
École Henri-Bergeron	French immersion	5–8; 4–6 (middle immersion)
Nelson McIntyre Collegiate	English	9–12
Windsor Park Collegiate	English	9–12

=== Others ===
School/centre	Language	Grades
Learning from Home School / L'École Apprendre chez soi	English & French	K–12
Louis Riel Arts and Technology Centre	English	11–12 Tech. & post-secondary
René Deleurme Centre	English	N-adult

== Notable alumni ==
List of notable people that were former students of a secondary school in the division.

- Adam Smoluk — Actor, Screenwriter, and Director
- Andrea Slobodian — Reporter
- Cam Connor — professional NHL hockey player and Stanley Cup winner with the Montreal Canadiens, New York Rangers and Edmonton Oilers. Also appeared on Wipeout Canada.
- Connie Laliberte — Curler
- Corinne Peters — Curler
- Dave Richter — played 365 games as an NHL defenceman with Minnesota North Stars, Philadelphia Flyers, Vancouver Canucks, and St. Louis Blues.
- Dylan McIlrath — NHL Player
- Edward Connery —Progressive Conservative member of the Legislative Assembly of Manitoba, cabinet minister under Gary Filmon.
- Elijah Harper — Politician
- Gabriel Langlois: Known as "Dancing Gabe" by Winnipeg sports fans.
- Gerald Ducharme —Progressive Conservative member of the Legislative Assembly of Manitoba, cabinet minister under Gary Filmon.
- Janet Arnott — Olympic Curler
- Jennifer Jones —professional Curler, 2014 Sochi Winter Olympics Gold Medallist
- Jim Peebles — Won the Nobel Prize in Physics
- Laurie Hawn — Member of Parliament
- Mike Ridley —professional NHL hockey player with New York Rangers, Washington Capitals, Toronto Maple Leafs and Vancouver Canucks
- Monica Goermann — Canadian National Artistic Gymnastic Team (1978–81)
- Nigel Dawes — Professional hockey player.
- Obie Baizley — Progressive Conservative member of the Legislative Assembly of Manitoba, cabinet minister under Dufferin Roblin and Walter Weir.
- Reid Carruthers — World Men's Curling Champion
- Robert "Butch" Goring — professional NHL hockey player, notable for winning 4 consecutive Stanley Cup with the New York Islanders.
- "Rowdy" Roddy Piper —WWE Legend and Hall of famer
- Sami Jo Small — Canadian national women's hockey team goaltender
- Scott Koskie — Setter for the Canadian National Men's Volleyball Team (1995–2007)
- Theresa Oswald — Politician
- Tricia Mayba — Volleyball Player
- Wab Kinew — Premier of Manitoba, leader of the New Democratic Party of Manitoba

== See also ==
- List of school districts in Manitoba
