= Lorette, Manitoba =

Lorette
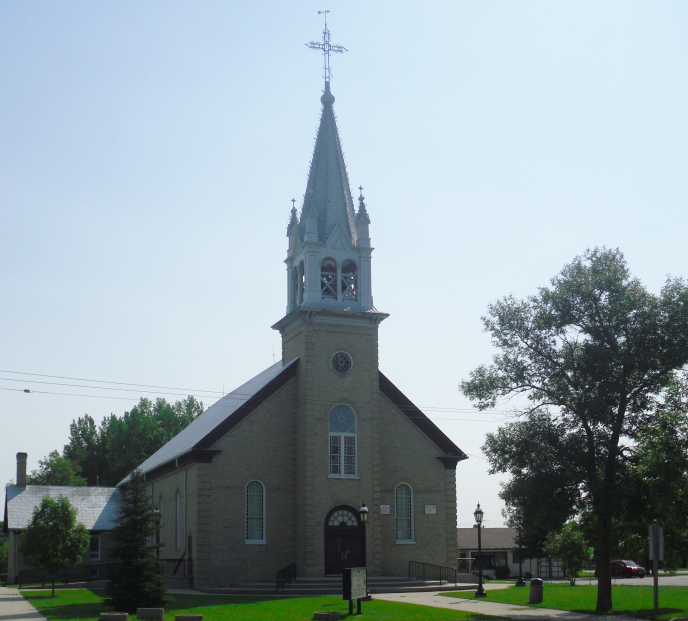
- The Notre-Dame de Lorette

- Location of Lorette in Manitoba
- Coordinates: 49°44′21″N 96°52′18″W
- Country: Canada
- Province: Manitoba
- Region: Eastman
- Rural Municipality: Taché

Government
  - Governing Body: Town Council
  - MP (Provencher): Ted Falk (CPC)
  - MLA (Dawson Trail): Bob Lagassé (Independent)

Area
  - Total: 4.68 km^{2} (1.81 sq mi)
- Elevation: 240 m (790 ft)

Population (2021)
  - Total: 3,512
  - Density: 685/km^{2} (1,770/sq mi)
- Time zone: UTC-6 (CST)
  - Summer (DST): UTC-5 (CDT)
- Forward sortation area: R5K
- Website: Lorette

Lorette is a local urban district in the Rural Municipality of Taché, located 25 km southeast of Winnipeg, in the province of Manitoba, Canada.

The French-speaking Métis traders and farmers who first settled the area named it Petite Pointe des Chênes. Bishop Alexandre-Antonin Taché later changed the name to Lorette, honoring a French priest who donated a significant sum to the construction of the Saint Boniface Cathedral in Winnipeg.

== Demographics ==
Population Growth
Year	Pop.	±%
2006	1,848	—
2011	2,361	+27.8%
2016	3,208	+35.9%
2021	3,512	+9.5%

In the 2021 Census of Population conducted by Statistics Canada, Lorette had a population of 3,512 living in 1,259 of its 1,295 total private dwellings, a change of 9.5% from its 2016 population of 3,208. With a land area of 4.72 km^{2} (1.82 sq mi), it had a population density of 744.1/km^{2} (1,927.1/sq mi) in 2021.

== Transportation ==
Lorette is located on Provincial Road 207, which is part of the historic Old Dawson Trail. PR 207 can be accessed via the Trans-Canada Highway from the north, PR 206 from the east or PR 405 from the south.

== Education ==
There are three elementary schools in Lorette. École Lagimodière, a French school; Dawson Trail School, an English school; and École Lorette Immersion, a French immersion school. Collège Lorette Collegiate is the community's only high school, offering English and French immersion programs. French grade 9-12 students travel to the nearby community of Ile-des-Chênes at École/Collège régional Gabrielle-Roy.

There is a community library located in the Collège Lorette Collegiate.

== Industry ==
The major employers in the community are the Municipality of Taché, the Seine River School Division, Division Scolaire Franco-Manitobaine and All Star Concrete.

== Notre-Dame de Lorette ==
Notre-Dame de Lorette, located on Dawson Road, is a Roman Catholic church offering services in French and English. Notre-Dame de Lorette was built at a cost of $20,000 and completed in 1900. The architect and builder was Auguste Gauthier of Lorette. The task required a great deal of volunteer labour supplied by the community.

The inside of the church features walls and ceilings adorned with oil murals by artist L.E. Monty of Montreal. The church is surmounted by three bells, which were poured in Haute-Savoie, France.

== Sports ==
The Complexe Communautaire de Lorette Community Complex (CCLCC) features a hockey rink, three-sheet curling rink, meeting rooms and a large hall. The Lorette Golf Course offers a nine-hole course along the Seine River.

The Lorette Scorpions were the 2011-2012 WHSHL champions.

=== Mascot ===
In late 2017, bison located adjacent to Provincial Highway 405 (south of Lorette) had, repeatedly, found their way past their electrified fencing and onto the highway. Through social media, the bison, officially unofficially named Frederick "Freddy" The Bison, quickly became the LUD's adopted mascot by many of the residents. Moving past social media, the story was reported by the CBC.

In addition to the Freddy's quick popularity with the residents as a mascot, he has also amassed a non-profit merchandising campaign in support of the CCLCC's new Complex. This has included custom birthday cards from the local flower shop to "Run Freddy Run" hoodies from the local designer.

== Sources ==
- Historical Atlas of Manitoba: A Selection of Facsimile Maps, Plans, and Sketches from 1612 to 1969, by John Warkentin and Richard I. Ruggles
- Barkwell, Lawrence J. (2018) Historic Metis settlements in Manitoba and geographical place names. Winnipeg, Manitoba: Louis Riel Institute, 2018. ISBN 978-1-927531-1-81
