= Ralph D. Parker =

Canadian mining executive (1898–1983)

Ralph D. Parker (1898–1983) worked in the Canadian mining industry. In 1921, he obtained a B. Sc. degree from the University of California.

Parker became a superintendent of mines at Inco beginning in 1931. He rose through the company and became senior vice-president. In 1963, he retired and was awarded, as the first recipient, the Chairman's Citation. Scientists under his direction developed the aerial magnetometer, a device used by the military to locate submarines.

Parker was inducted into the Canadian Mining Hall of Fame. R. D. Parker Collegiate, a high school in Thompson, Manitoba, is named in his honour.
