= J. H. Bruns Collegiate =

Secondary school in Winnipeg, Manitoba

J.H. Bruns Collegiate
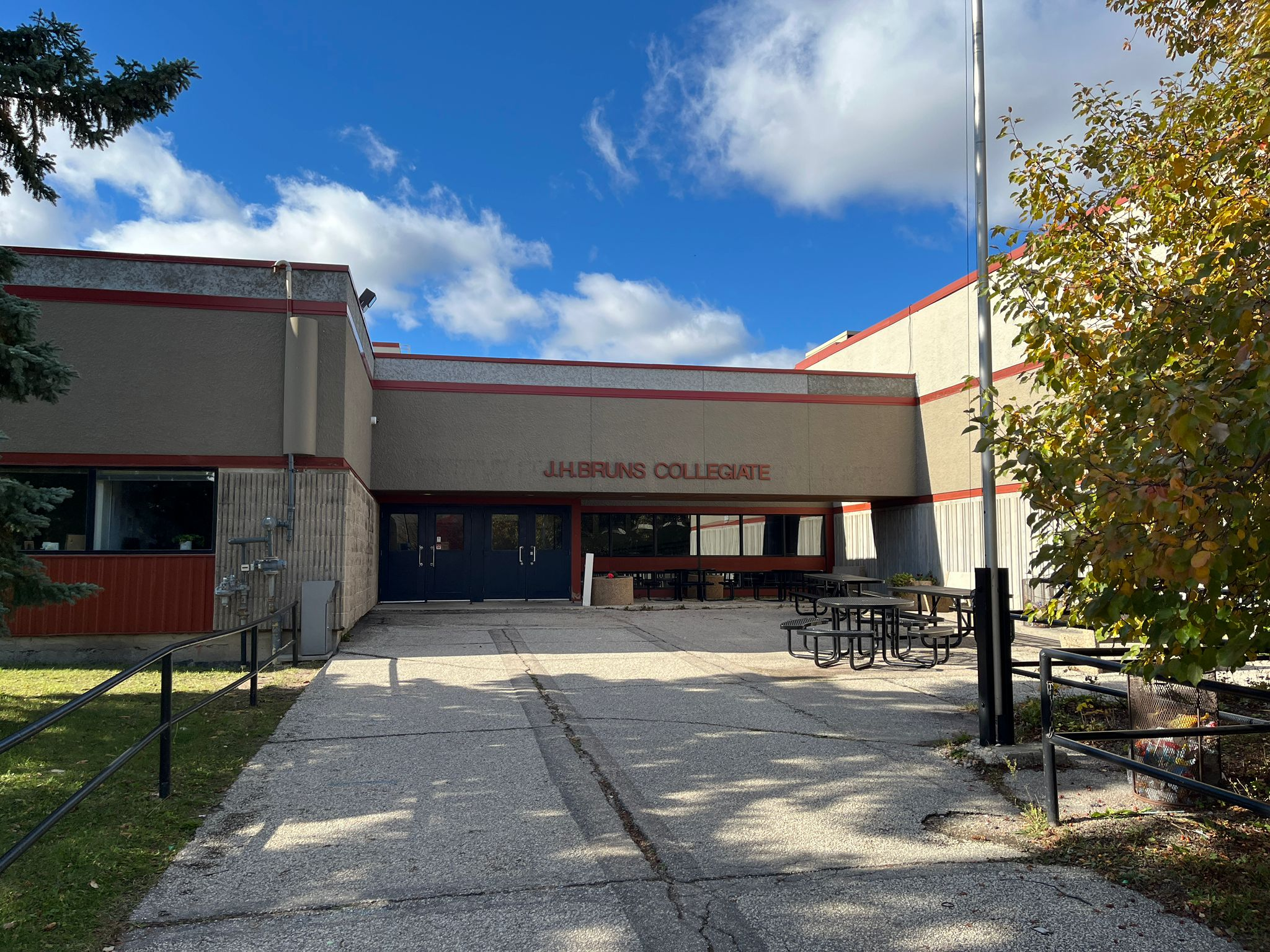

Location
- 250 Lakewood Blvd. Winnipeg, Manitoba, R2J 3A2; Canada; 49.8470°N 97.0776°W

Information
- School type: Public, Secondary School
- Founded: 1972
- School district: Louis Riel School Division
- Superintendent: Jackie Connell
- Area trustee: Chipalo Simunyola, Pamela Kolochuk
- Principal: Thomas Locke
- Vice-Principals: Melanie Romas, Brad Johnston, Tanya Stokotelny
- Grades: 9-12
- Enrollment: 1,034 (2026)
- Language: English
- Hours in school day: Morning 8:30 AM - 12:00 PM Afternoon 1:10 PM - 3:30 PM
- Campus: Suburban
- Area: Southdale
- Colours: Blue, Gold, White
- Mascot: Bronx the Bronco
- Team name: Broncos
- Website: www.lrsd.net/schools/JHB/

J.H. Bruns Collegiate is a secondary school in Winnipeg, Manitoba, Canada, established in 1972. It has approximately 1,034 students from grades 9 to 12. It offers a varied curriculum with a total of 135 courses.

== History ==
The school was named after Brother Joseph H. Bruns S.M., who was as an educator and superintendent in St. Boniface. The school opened in Southdale in September 1972. Initially, J. H. Bruns shared its gymnasium and sports facilities with the Southdale Recreation Association. During this period, the school functioned as a middle school offering grades 5 to 8, with higher grades being added each year thereafter. On October 30, 1975, a fire occurred at J. H. Bruns Collegiate. By the spring of 1976 classrooms were renovated, and a new wing was added to the school, which included the Industrial Arts and Human Ecology facility.

== Athletics ==
J.H. Bruns offers a variety of athletic programs, including:

- Badminton
- Baseball
- Basketball
- Curling
- Cross Country
- Golf
- Hockey
- Soccer
- Softball
- Track and Field
- Volleyball

== Clubs and Activities ==
J.H. Bruns offers several extracurricular activities and clubs, including:

- Board Game Club
- Book Club
- Bhangara Dance Club
- CCC (Crafting, Costuming & Cosplay)
- Cyber Defense Club
- Debate Club
- Diversity Alliance
- eSports (Drop-In) Club
- Fashion Show Club
- Indigenous Youth Leadership
- Math Help
- Rock Band
- Steam Club
- Student Leadership
- SHOW (Students Helping Our World)
- Tiny Embroidery Club
- Yoga Club

== School Administration ==
Principals

- Mr. G. A. Guilbault, 1972 – 1975
- Mr. Hank Neufeld, 1975 – 1980
- Mr. Peter Janzen, 1980 – 1996
- Mr. Neil Johnson, 1996 – 2001
- Mr. Bob Town, 2001 – 2013
- Mr. Henri Péloquin, 2013 – 2018
- Ms. Julie Côté-Marinelli, 2018 – 2018 (Acting Principal)
- Mr. Ralph Wagner, 2018 – 2019
- Ms. Julie Côté-Marinelli, 2019 – 2022
- Mr. Thomas Locke, 2025–

Vice-Principals

- Mr. Moe Oye, 1972 – 1979,
- Mr. Léo Duguay, 1979 – 1980
- Mr. Moe Oye, 1980 – 1996
- Ms. Gail Atkins, 1996 – 2002
- Ms. Irene Nordheim, 2002 – 2005
- Ms. Marilyn Thorington, 2005 – 2006
- Ms. Karen Haluschak, 2006 – 2009
- Mr. Ray Houssin, 2007 – 2010
- Ms. Patti Field, 2009 – 2011
- Mr. Curt Krahn, 2010 – 2014
- Ms. Charlene Smallwood, 2011 – 2015
- Mr. Greg Meade, 2014 – 2016
- Ms. Julie Côté-Marinelli, 2015 – 2018
- Mr. Joel Shimoji, 2016 – 2020
- Mrs. Carrie Schimnowski, 2018 – 2018
- Ms. Julie Côté-Marinelli, 2018 – 2019
- Ms. Elaine Solinski, 2019 – 2021
- Mrs. Carrie Schimnowski, 2020 – 2022
- Ms. Sheila Lynch-Mondor, 2021 – 2022
- Ms. Ingrid Pedersen, 2022 – 2025
- Ms. Melanie Romas, 2025–
- Mr. Brad Johnston, 2025–
- Tanya Stokotelny, 2026-

== Feeder schools ==
J.H. Bruns Collegiate receives a large portion of its student population from several designated feeder schools. These schools include:

- Island Lakes Community School
- Niakwa Place School
- Sage Creek School
- Shamrock School

Additional students are admitted through out-of-catchment transfer requests.

== Notable alumni ==
- Jett Woo, NHL player
