= Collège Jeanne-Sauvé =

Public secondary school in Winnipeg, Manitoba, Canada

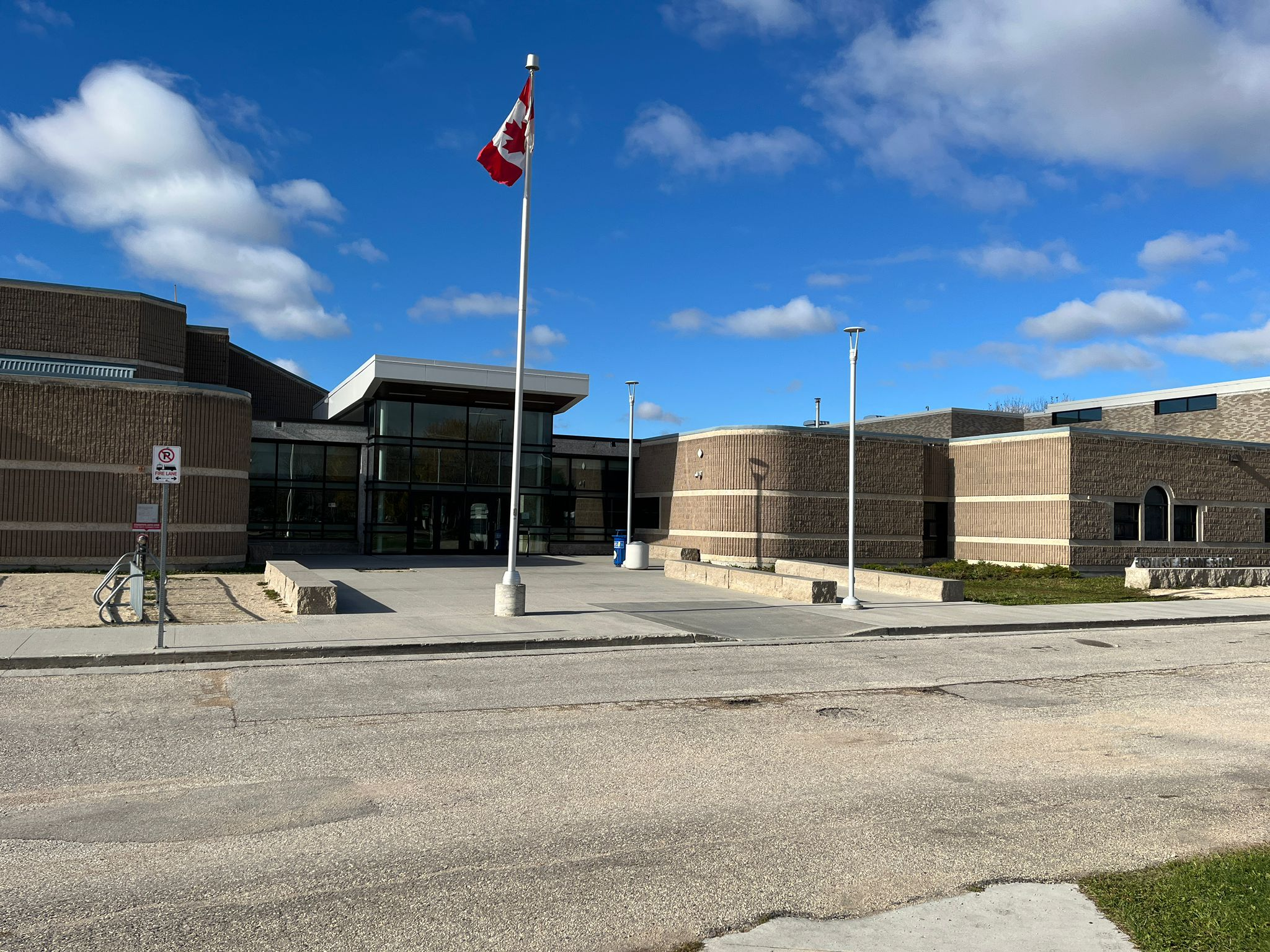

Location
- 1128 Dakota Street; Winnipeg, Manitoba, R2N 3T8; Canada; 49°49′15″N 97°06′01″W

Information
- Type: Public middle and secondary
- Motto: Les racines de l'avenir (Foundations for Tomorrow)
- Established: 1989; 37 years ago
- School district: Louis Riel School Division
- Superintendent: Jackie Connell
- Principal: Sharad Srivastava
- Vice Principal: Jacqueline Chan
- Grades: 9-12
- Enrollment: ~850
- Language: French (immersion)
- Campus: Suburban
- Colours: Blue and black
- Mascot: Olympiens
- Website: https://www.lrsd.net/cjs/

Collège Jeanne-Sauvé, also commonly referred to as CJS, is a French-immersion high school in Winnipeg Manitoba, Canada, and the first French-immersion high school in western Canada.

Situated in the southern St. Vital area of Winnipeg, Manitoba, it is part of the Louis Riel School Division. The high school runs from grades 9 to 12, and is named in honour of the former governor-general of Canada, Jeanne Sauvé.

== History ==
Collège Jeanne-Sauvé was the first French-immersion high school in western Canada. It was created as a result of the efforts of parents to ensure that their children be able to continue in French immersion after grade 8. The school was finally opened in January 1990 for grades 6 through 12. Its name was chosen to recognize the distinct ability that former Governor General of Canada Jeanne Sauvé had to bridge the gap between English and French communities, one of the main goals of French immersion. Sauvé was invited to the official opening of the school, which took place on March 1, 1990. While she was unable to attend, she kept her promise to visit the school: Sauvé visited Collège Jeanne-Sauvé for the entire school day on October 5, 1990, where she spoke to students and staff and visited classrooms in the school.

In April 2024, Collège Jeanne-Sauvé announced that it will receive a new principal, by the name of Sharad Srivatsa, this change came into effect on August 1 of the same year.

In September 2025, a grade 9 Physical education class taking place in the nearby forest had an altercation with a homeless person living in a nearby tent set up in the forest, one student was injured but did not require medical attention.

In 2026, Grade 10 student James Hohner created a website designed to help teachers create seating plans for their classrooms.

== Humour in popular culture ==
On September 30, 2025, a TikTok channel called "the.cjs.pisser" posted a video where the Cameraman appears to be urinating on the Collège Jeanne-Sauvé street sign, another video from the channel shows what appears to be the Cameraman urinating on a Fire Hydrant on the other side of the street, as of October 20, 2025, the channel has 4 videos with its first one having 26,200 views. In response to the channel, a second channel called "cjs.piss.detectiv" (CJS Piss Detectives) was created, to search for the.cjs.pisser, as of October 17, 2025, cjs.piss.detectiv has one video with 20 300 views.

== Feeder schools ==
The schools whose students generally enroll in Collège Jeanne-Sauvé are École St. Germain, École Julie-Riel, École Marie-Anne-Gaboury, École George McDowell, and École Varennes. There are also students who come from other French schools within the community.

== Notable alumni ==
- Gabby May, artistic gymnast
- Adrien Sala Minister of Finance and Member of the Legislative Assembly of Manitoba for St. James
- Andrea Slobodian, reporter
- Sami Jo Small, Canadian national women's hockey team goaltender
