= R. D. Parker Collegiate =

R.D. Parker Collegiate
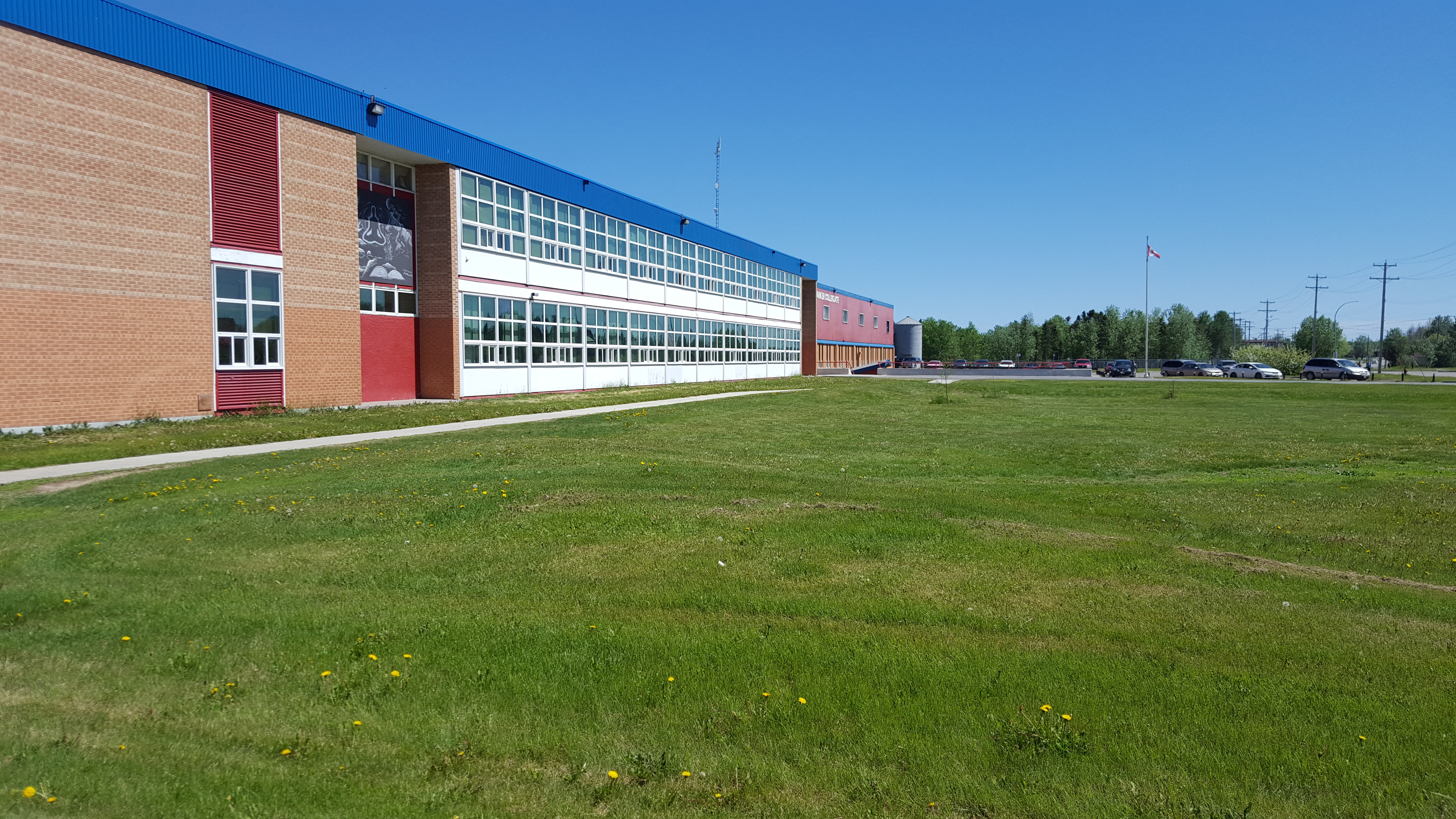

Location
- Thompson, Manitoba; Canada; 55.7481°N 97.8649°W

Information
- Type: Public High school
- Motto: Success Begins Here
- School district: School District of Mystery Lake
- Grades: 9–12
- Enrollment: 1200
- Campus: Urban
- Website: www.rdpc.ca

R.D. Parker Collegiate is the only high school in Thompson, Manitoba for students in grades 9-12. The approximately 1,025 students of R.D. Parker Collegiate come from the city of Thompson and other northern Communities. R.D. Parker Collegiate was named after the [at the time] Vice President of Inco, Ralph D. Parker, also located in Thompson.

The teaching staff of R.D. Parker Collegiate are members of the Thompson Teachers' Association. R.D. Parker Collegiate, in the 2012–13 school year, has a number of clubs including a Student Council. The school sports teams are called the Trojans.

R.D. Parker Collegiate offers courses in mathematics (divided into Consumer Math, Applied Math, and Precalculus), English, Science (Biology, Chemistry, and Physics), Social Studies and a number of optional courses typical of Canadian high schools. It also offers an aviation program (introduced to the course list in 2004) and special foods, arts, woodshop, and mechanical courses.

== Notable alumni ==
- Danielle Adams former Member of the Legislative Assembly of Manitoba (MLA) for Thompson
