= Seven Oaks School Division =

School division in Manitoba, Canada

Coordinates: 49.945°N 97.143°W

- 830 Powers St, Winnipeg, MB R2V 4E7

District information
- Established: July 1959; 67 years ago
- Superintendent: Tony Kreml
- Chair of the board: Edward Ploszay
- Schools: 27 (as of 2023)

Other information
- Regions served: Northwest Winnipeg and RM of West St. Paul
- Website: 7oaks.org

Seven Oaks School Division (SOSD, or colloquially 7 Oaks) is a school division in the north-west area of Winnipeg, Manitoba in Canada. Established in July 1959, it takes in the Winnipeg neighbourhoods of West Kildonan, Garden City, the Maples, Riverbend, and Amber Trails, as well as the Rural Municipality of West St. Paul.

== Schools ==
As of 2023, there are 21 elementary & middle schools, 6 high schools (with 3 being Met schools), and 3 other educational programs.

In February 2023, the Government of Manitoba announced that two new K–8 schools in SOSD will be built and operating by September 2027, increasing the total number of schools to 29.

=== Elementary and middle schools ===
School	Grades	Language program
Amber Trails Community School	K-8	English (K-8) Punjabi bilingual (K-2)
Arthur E. Wright Community School	K-8	English (K-8) and Filipino bilingual (K-6)
École Belmont	K-5	French immersion
Collicutt School	K-5	English
École Constable Edward Finney School	K-5	English and French immersion
Edmund Partridge Community School	6-8	English
Elwick Community School	K-8	English
Forest Park School	K-5	English
Governor Semple School	K-5	English
H.C. Avery Middle School	6-8	English
James Nisbet Community School	K-8	English
École Leila North Community School	6-8	English and French immersion
Margaret Park School	K-5	English
O.V. Jewitt Community School	K-8	English
Школа R.F. Morrison School	K-5(6)	English (K-5) and Ukrainian (K-6)
École Riviere Rouge	K-5	English and French immersion
Riverbend Community School	K-5	English and Ojibway bilingual
École Seven Oaks Middle School	6-8	English and French immersion
École Templeton	K-5	English and French immersion
Victory School	K-5	English
West St. Paul School	K-8	English

=== High schools and others ===
- Garden City Collegiate
- Maples Collegiate
- West Kildonan Collegiate

The Seven Oaks School Division also has Met Schools, which are high schools that essentially include both school work and practical experience/internships, similar to practicum. Opening its first Met School in 2009, the Division now has three Met School campuses and more than 240 students:

- Maples Met School, located within Maples Collegiate
- Seven Oaks Met School, at 640 Jefferson Avenue
- Exchange Met School: Met Centre for Arts & Technology (MCAT), at 321 McDermot Avenue within the Exchange District —

Seven Oaks also has three other educational sites:

- Adult Learning Centre, at 950 Jefferson Avenue
- Adult Education Centre, at 1747 Main Street
- Wayfinders — community-based mentorship and outreach program

== See also ==
- List of school districts in Manitoba
