= Dancing Gabe =

Canadian sports fan (born 1963)

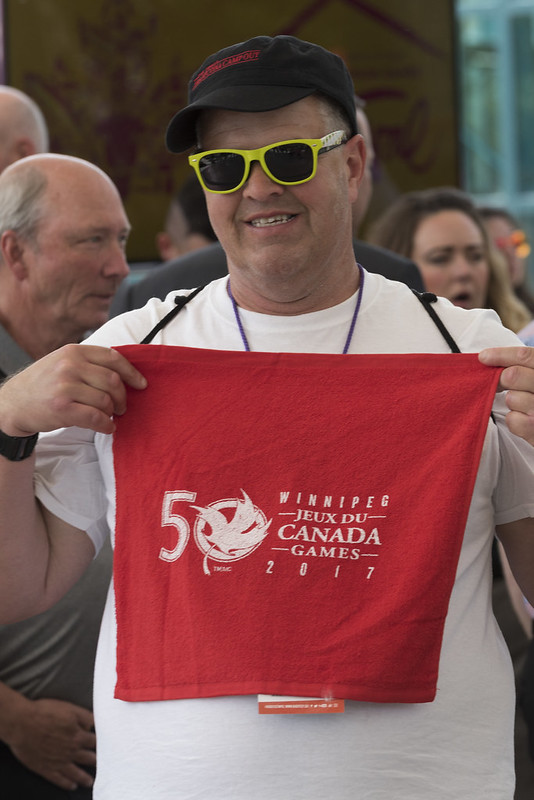
- Gabe at the 2017 Canada Summer Games
- Born: Gabriel Langlois; January 29, 1963 (age 63); Winnipeg, Manitoba, Canada
- Years active: 1984–present
- Known for: Dancing at Winnipeg Jets, Winnipeg Blue Bombers, and Winnipeg Goldeyes games

Gabriel Langlois (born 1963), better known as Dancing Gabe, is a Canadian fan of the Winnipeg Jets, Manitoba Moose, Winnipeg Blue Bombers, and the Winnipeg Goldeyes. He first gained notoriety in 1984, when he attended a Bombers game and was noticed dancing in the crowd. On December 20, 2014, Gabe danced at his 1,000th professional hockey game in Winnipeg.

== Early life ==
Gabriel Langlois was born in Winnipeg, Manitoba on January 29, 1963, to parents Angelina and Louis Langlois. He was diagnosed with autism at the age of three and was institutionalized in Portage la Prairie, Manitoba, at the age of six. He was non-verbal until he was ten years old. He took specialized classes in Notre Dame de Lourdes, Manitoba, where a nun taught him how to read and write. On July 8, 1974, Langlois returned from the institution to live with his parents and siblings in St. Vital. He graduated from Glenlawn Collegiate in 1981.

== History ==
On January 21, 1991, Gabe and his brother were attending an NHL game at the Winnipeg Arena, when he was given a personalized Winnipeg Jets jersey by Mike O’Hearn, who was the Jets director of public relations at the time. Gabe often wears the number 91 on his jerseys to commemorate this moment.

== Honours ==
In 2013, Gabe was awarded the Queen Elizabeth II Diamond Jubilee Medal. In 2020, he received the Sovereign's Medal for Volunteers by the Lieutenant governor of Manitoba Janice Filmon.

In February 2021, he was awarded an honorary diploma in community development from Red River College Polytechnic.
