= Flin Flon School Division =

School district in Manitoba, Canada

Coordinates: 54.775°N 101.872°W

The Flin Flon School Division maintains and operates two elementary schools and two high schools in the city of Flin Flon, Manitoba, Canada. The Flin Flon School Division provides educational services to the children of Flin Flon, Channing, and the residentially developed nearby areas of Big Island, Schist Lake and Bakers Narrows on Lake Athapapuskow.

Historically, the School Division has also served the high school students of nearby Creighton, Saskatchewan, and Denare Beach, Saskatchewan, although in 2003/2004, Creighton residents began the development of their own High School Program at Creighton School.

Notable alumni who attended schools in the Flin Flon School Division include professional ice hockey players Bobby Clarke, Reggie Leech and Reid Simpson.

== Schools ==
- Ruth Betts School
- Hapnot Collegiate Hapnot Collegiate
- Many Faces Education Centre Many Faces Education Centre
- Ecolé McIsaac School Ecole McIsaac School

== See also ==
List of school districts in Manitoba
