= Nelson McIntyre Collegiate =

Location
- 188 St. Mary's Rd. Winnipeg, Manitoba, R2H 1H9; Canada; 49.8757°N 97.1205°W

Information
- School type: Public, Secondary School
- Motto: Fiat lux (Light The Torch)
- School board: Louis Riel School Division
- Superintendent: Christian Michalik
- Principal: Kimberley Adair-Gagnon
- Grades: Grades 9-12
- Enrollment: 350
- Language: English
- Colours: Black & Yellow
- Team name: Torchbearers

Nelson McIntyre Collegiate (NMC) is a grade 9-12 high school in Winnipeg, Manitoba. It is part of the Louis Riel School Division and has an enrollment of approximately 400 students.

The school offers a wide range of programs for students of all skill levels and has a diverse student body that includes students from all over the world including International (Visa) Students from around the world.

In September 2015, NMC incorporated “Propel”, a district-wide, semester-long elective project-based learning opportunity into the school's programming.

In September 2016, NMC began a 4-year process of changing its educational model from a “traditional” model to a school-wide project-based learning model.

== History ==
=== Origins ===
==== Norwood Collegiate Institute ====
In 1914, a high school was established at the Tache School, a stone-structured building housing only ten rooms and a hall for assemblies, out of the need to extend education to a growing number of students beyond the 8th grade.t was then that Tache School began holding classes for Grades 9, 10, and 11 only. Students of the community of Norwood were allowed to complete their 12th grade education in one of the other schools in the community of St. Boniface. Boys were sent to Provencher School while the girls attended St. Joseph's Academy. As Tache School's attendance swelled beyond the capacity of the original Tache School, even when additions were built, some classes were taught in houses near the school and the Marion Street Salvation Army Hall. Once King George V School, now owned and operated by Springs Christian Academy, in 1916, classes in homes and at the Salvation Army Hall ceased. In 1927, following the establishment of the Norwood School District No. 2113 in 1925, Tache High School was given collegiate status and, thus, changed its name to "Norwood Collegiate Institute". With another increase in enrollment, plans were made for the school to move to a site already owned by the Norwood School Board. While changes were made in 1940, Grades 10, 11 and 12 students were moved to a temporary structure - temporary due to a shortage of funds because of the European War - on Highfield St. at St. Mary's Rd.

Following the war, in 1947, the firm of Green, Blankstein, and Russell presented plans for the new building to house the students and staff of Norwood Collegiate Institute. It would take nearly a decade for the official opening, which took place on November 16, 1956.

==== Nelson McIntyre Collegiate ====
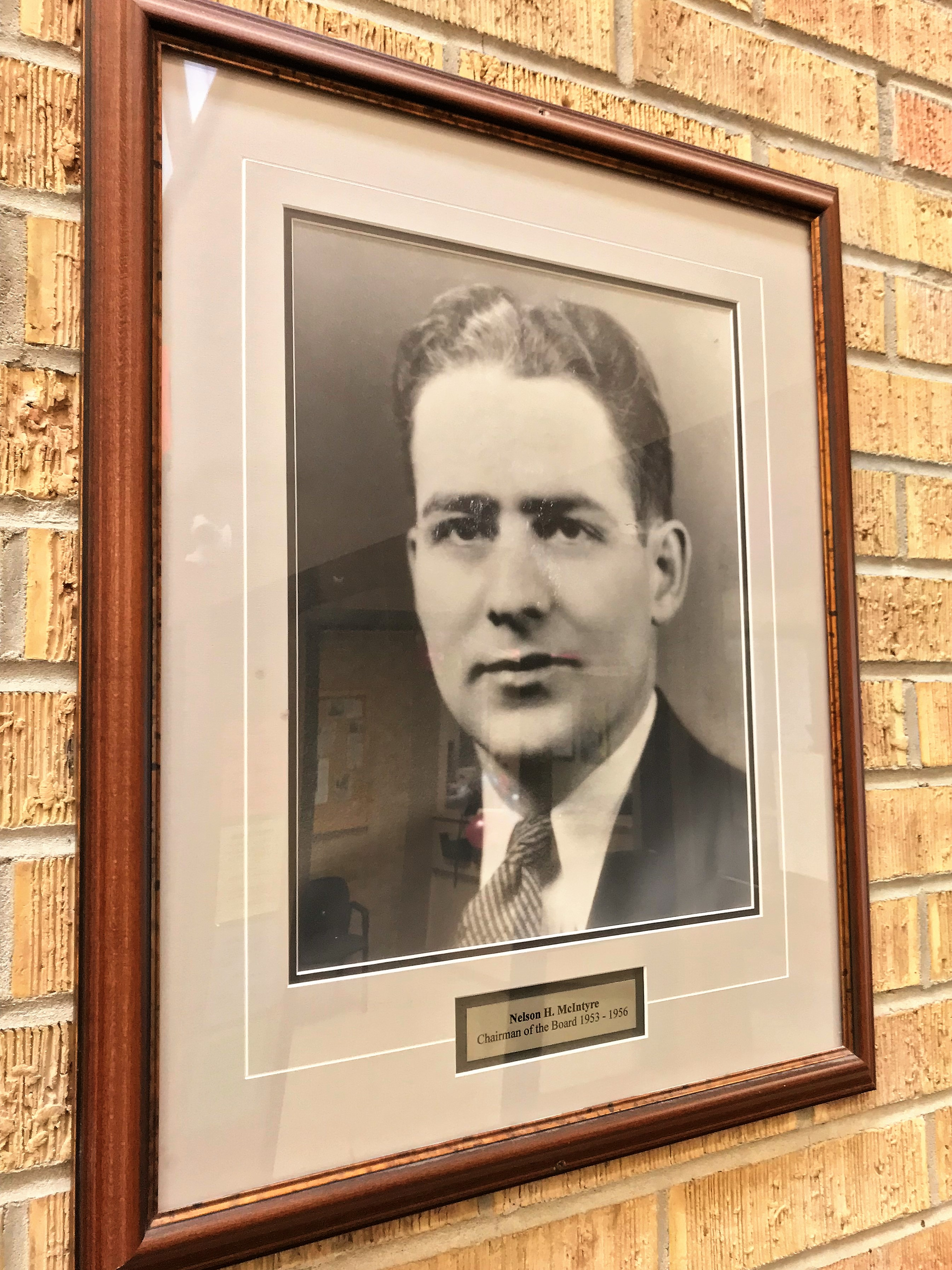
This portrait of Nelson K. McIntyre hangs in the front foyer of Nelson McIntyre Collegiate.

To mark the historic occasion of the long-awaited high school (which would now house Grades 9 through 12), the school's new name, N.K. McIntyre Collegiate, was chosen in memory of Nelson K. McIntyre, who served as the chairman of the Norwood School Board at the time of his death. McIntyre, who laboured long and hard to see this new building through to fruition died only a few weeks before the official opening ceremony of the school, which was held on November 15, 1956 at the school's present location of 188 St. Mary's Road in the Norwood West area of the Winnipeg's "city ward" of St. Boniface.

N.K. McIntyre Collegiate eventually went through another minor name change to become, simply, Nelson McIntyre Collegiate.

===== Arson =====
Over the years, the school has suffered from 3 fires. Two of the fires, though causing great damage to the textiles and graphic arts labs, were contained to the Industrial Arts/Human Ecology wing of the school and are, therefore, considered "minor" in comparison to the first fire which occurred in 1986.

One broadcast, heard on Tuesdasy, July 22, 1986, stated that "an estimated $5 million fire had completed destroyed Nelson McIntyre Collegiate in Norwood". This fire was intentionally set, as evidenced by the point of origin on the second floor and spreading south the roofline. With the help of many, all files and records were safely and securely removed from the attached Norwood School Division board offices in under 45 minutes; however, the teaching staff were not as fortunate. Many of them lost years of paper records, teaching materials, and equipment.

The official re-opening of Nelson McIntyre Collegiate, following this first fire, took place on November 15, 1987.

=== School Division Affiliation ===
Presently, Nelson McIntyre Collegiate (known by students as Nelson Mac, NMC, or lovingly as "The Mac") is a part of the Louis Riel School Division. and was the only high school in the Norwood School Division No. 8. In 1998, the Norwood School Division No. 8 amalgamated with the St. Boniface School Division No. 4. And in 2002, the recently conjoined St. Boniface School Division No. 4 was paired with the St. Vital School Division No. 6, in the province's efforts to restructure the existing 54 school divisions to 37. The new school division was named Louis Riel School Division (without a number designation) after Louis Riel, the key figure of the Red River Rebellion, and the Father of Manitoba.

=== Commemorated Honours ===
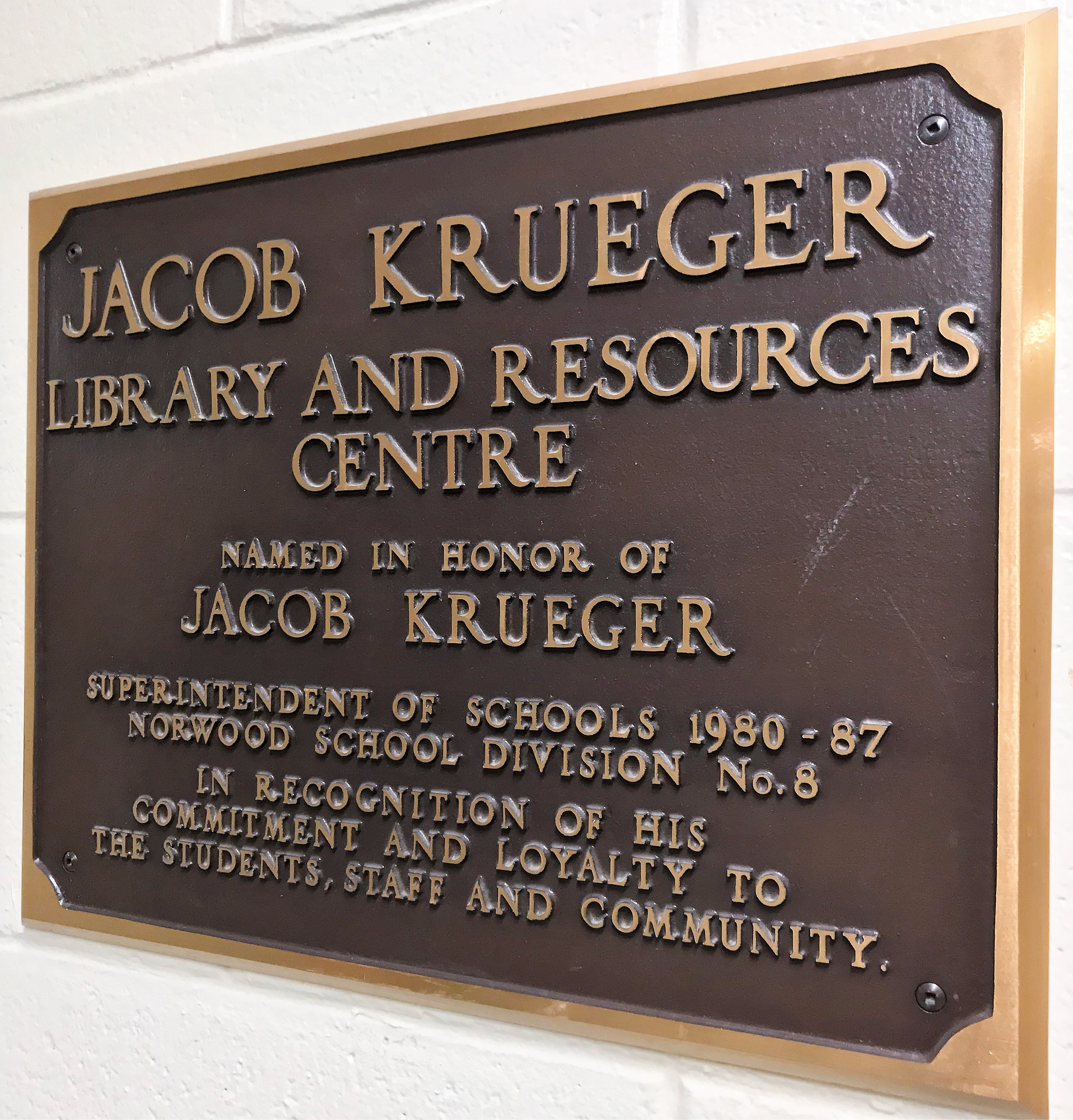
Commemorated Plaque at the entrance to the library at NMC

Nelson McIntyre Collegiate's gymnasium is named in honour of James W. Downey. Mr. Downey was the Superintendent of Norwood School Division from 1969-1980. The gymnasium was officially opened on March 21, 1977.

The school's library and resources centre, located on the main floor of the school, also stands in dedication of a former superintendent of schools of Norwood School Division No.8: Jacob Krueger.

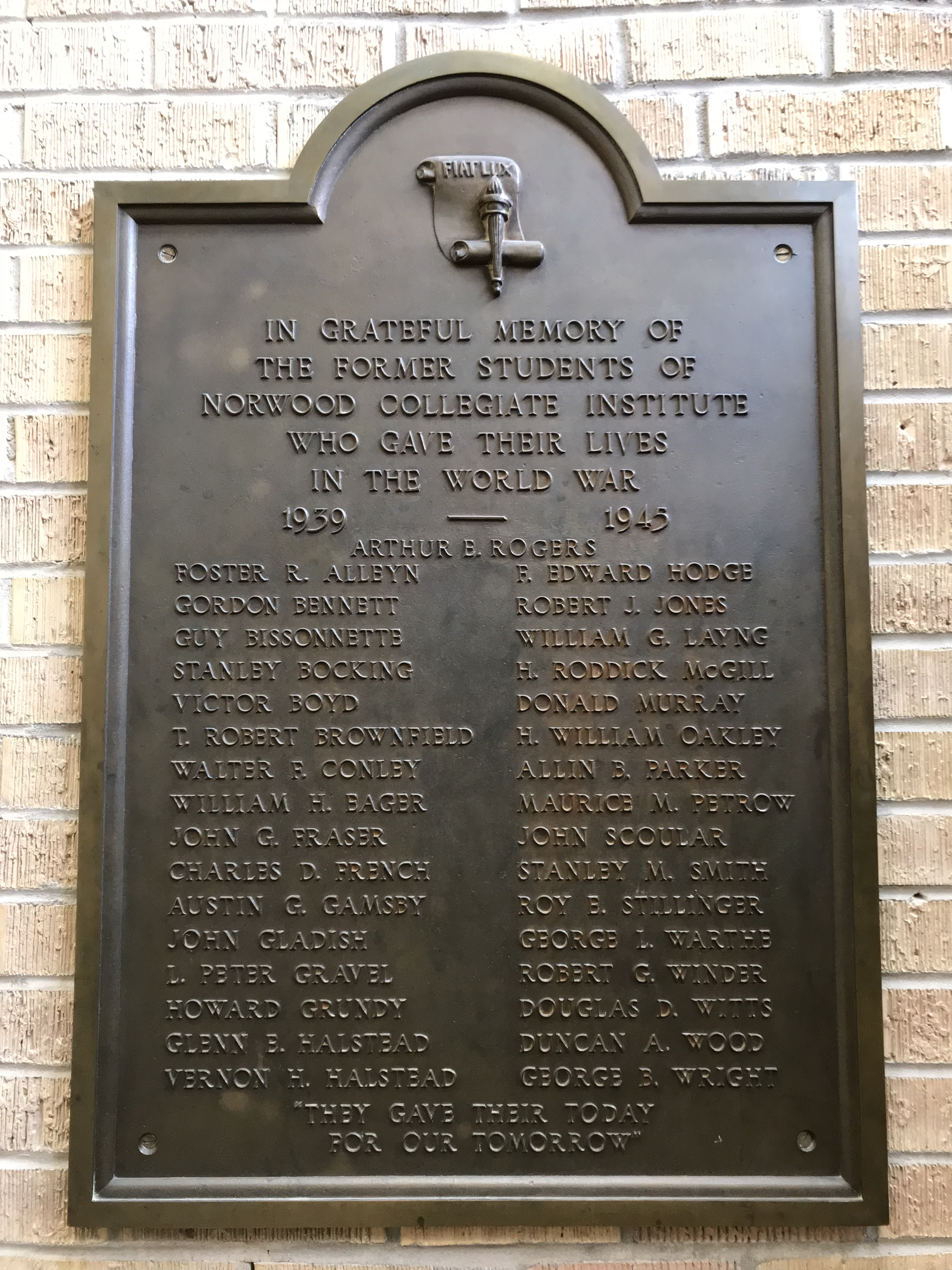
Memorial Plaque in Remembrance of Norwood Collegiate Institute's Veterans of World War II

Nelson McIntyre Collegiate has, as part of its shared history with the former Norwood Collegiate Institute, the rare distinction of having veterans of World War II as part of its alumnae. And, as such, has had some of those alums give their life in the service of their country. A memorial plaque honouring the memory of the fallen soldiers hangs in the front foyer of Nelson McIntyre Collegiate. It reads: "In grateful memory of the former students of Norwood Collegiate Institute who gave their lives in the World War 1939 - 1945". It honours 33 fallen alumni of Norwood Collegiate Institute.

=== School Awards of Distinction ===
The first Merit Award was presented to S.E.Brock in 1928, and the oldest Nelson McIntyre trophy is the Norbridge Trophy presented by Frank Wade to the N.M.C. Badminton Club doubles, one for the boys and one for the girls in 1959.
