= School District of Mystery Lake =

School district in Manitoba, Canada

Location
- 408 Thompson Dive North; Thompson, Manitoba; R8N 0C5 Thompson, Manitoba Canada

District information
- Superintendent: Lorie Henderson Angele Bartlett
- Chair of the board: Hendrik Warnar-Brown
- Schools: 7
- Budget: CA$39,520,920

Students and staff
- Students: 2,967

Other information
- Elected trustees: Michelle Tomashewski; Lindsay Anderson; Abbie Humby; Michele Nichol-Sawh; MD Sharker; Bryan Young
- Website: www.mysterynet.mb.ca

The School District of Mystery Lake provides educational services in the city of Thompson, Manitoba at six elementary schools and one high school. The School District of Mystery Lake offers programs in both English and French languages.

During the late 1990s, it was recognized that many of the cultural and language needs of First Nations peoples in northern Manitoba were not being adequately addressed by the predominantly English school system. Programming that encourages the use of Cree language has been initiated by the school district to address these needs. The staff of Wapanohk - Eastwood Community School have worked closely with the Manitoba First Nations Education Resource Centre in program development. Approximately half of the instructional and support staff of Wapanohk - Eastwood Community School are speakers of the Cree language, and the student population is an estimated 80 - 85% Cree.

== List of Schools ==
=== Elementary ===
Elementary Schools
School name	Grades Provided	English/French
Burntwood Elementary	K-8	Y/N
Deerwood School	Pre-K-8	Y/N
Juniper School	K-8	Y/N
École Riverside School	K-8	Y/Y
Wapanohk Community School	K-8	Y/N
Westwood Elementary	K-8	Y/N

=== Secondary ===
R.D. Parker Collegiate (Grade: 9–12)

=== Past ===
School name	Info	Year of Change
Eastwood School	Renamed to Wapanohk-Eastwood Community School	2004
Thompson High School	Renamed to R.D. Parker Collegiate	1963
Ecole Deerwood School	French Immersion removed.	1994
Thompson School #1	Renamed to Juniper School	1962

== Sports ==
=== Knights of Columbus ===
(Indoor Track Meet)

Grades Three(3) to Eight(8), every May all six(6) Elementary Schools participate in the annual event.

The following are the events, High Jump, Long Jump, Shot Put, 50 Metres, 100 metres, 200 metres, 300 Metres, 1000 Metres, CO-ED Relay and 4x1 Relay.

This event takes place in the C.A. Nesbitt Arena of the Thompson Recreational Centre which is located near the R.D. Parker Collegiate.

== Notable alumni ==
- Hon. Steve Ashton, Member of the Manitoba Legislative Assembly

== See also ==
- List of school districts in Manitoba
