= École/Collège régional Gabrielle-Roy =

École/Collège Régional Gabrielle-Roy

Location
- Île-des-Chênes, Rural Municipality of Ritchot, Manitoba; Canada; 49°42′27″N 96°59′05″W

Information
- Type: Public elementary and secondary (French language)
- Motto: Le français est notre choix
- Established: 1984
- School district: Division Scolaire Franco-Manitobaine (DSFM no 49)
- Principal: Patrice Harvey
- Grades: K–12
- Enrollment: 502 (2020)
- Campus: Rural
- Colours: Red, Black and White
- Mascot: Rex (a lion)
- Website: groy.dsfm.mb.ca

École/Collège régional Gabrielle-Roy, built in 1984, is a French-language high school in Île-des-Chênes, Manitoba, Canada. It gathers students from the communities of Île-des-Chênes, Lorette, St. Norbert, La Salle, St. Adolphe, Ste. Agathe, Dufresne, Niverville, Grande Pointe and Ste. Genevieve. The E/CRGR forces itself to be the prolongation of the Franco-Manitoban family by making French language first, therefore immersing the students in their culture and making it an active part of their daily lives.

The school is named after Gabrielle Roy, a Canadian author.
