= Crocus Plains Regional Secondary School =

Location
- 1930 1st Street; Brandon, Manitoba, R7A 6Y6; Canada; 49.8191°N 99.9403°W

Information
- School type: High School
- Motto: P.F.L (Plainsmen For Life)
- Founded: 1973
- School board: Brandon School Division#40
- Principal: Bryce Ridgen
- Grades: 9-12
- Enrollment: 1155 (2024)
- Language: English
- Area: South Brandon
- Colours: Maroon and Gold
- Mascot: Bullet (Plainsmen)
- Team name: Plainsmen
- Website: bsd.ca/crocus/

Crocus Plains Regional Secondary School is a secondary school teaching grades 9-12 in Brandon, Manitoba. The school opened in September 1974. With a major 1.8 million dollar addition opening in 1985. Crocus Plains Regional Secondary School (CPRSS) offers 9-12 diplomas along with offering specialty technology and vocational courses.

== Notable alumni ==
- Mike McEwen (curler), Curler
- Landon Rice, CFL Football Player
- Kevin Boyd, Coach
- Eric Boyd, Football Player
- Derek Sholdice, CFL football player
