= Garden City Collegiate =

Location
- 711 Jefferson Avenue; Winnipeg, Manitoba, R2V 0P7; Canada
- Coordinates: 49°56′32″N 97°08′39″W

Information
- School type: Public high school
- Motto: Participation and Excellence
- School district: Seven Oaks School Division
- Principal: Howard Kowalchuk
- Grades: 9–12
- Enrollment: 1420
- Language: English and French Immersion
- Area: Garden City
- Colours: Gold & Black
- Team name: Gophers
- Website: www.7oaks.org/school/gardencity

Garden City Collegiate (GCC or GC) is a high school in Winnipeg, Manitoba. It is part of the Seven Oaks School Division, and houses grades 9–12. The Garden City motto is "Participation and Excellence."

Garden City Collegiate offers two programs: the English Diploma and the French Immersion Diploma. Garden City is the only high school in Seven Oaks School Division that offers both programs to all students. It’s academic, volunteering, performing arts and athletics programs are highlights for student learning.

In 2009 the school joined its 2 formerly separate buildings (the east building) formerly being Jefferson Junior High School. It has also had a new large Commons area and gymnasium built to house a cafeteria, larger school and athletic events.

== Notable alumni ==
- Randy Bachman – musician (The Guess Who, B.T.O.)
- Marco Bustos – professional soccer player
- Andrea Macasaet - Broadway actress
- Jarred Ogungbemi-Jackson – professional basketball player
- Colton Orr – professional athlete
- Remy Shand – musician

== See also ==
- Seven Oaks School Division
