= Windsor Park Collegiate =

Location
- 1015 Cottonwood Road; Winnipeg, Manitoba, R2J 1G3; Canada; 49.8617°N 97.0744°W

Information
- School type: Public, Secondary school
- Motto: Bold Education. Inspired Minds.
- Founded: 1960
- School board: Louis Riel School Division
- Superintendent: Christian Michalik
- Principal: Robbie Mager
- Staff: 38 teachers, 36 support staff
- Grades: Grades 9-12
- Enrollment: 730 (2024)
- Language: English/Français Partiel
- Area: Windsor Park
- Colours: Purple and Silver
- Mascot: The Duke of Windsor
- Team name: Royals
- Website: www.lrsd.net/schools/WPC/
- Last updated: 2022 May 16

Windsor Park Collegiate (WPC) is a public secondary school in Winnipeg, Manitoba, within the Louis Riel School Division.

== History ==
"In the year of nineteen hundred and sixty, in the community of Windsor Park, there opened a school that became a legend. Only one other school in North America had this unique hexagonal architecture. The first principal of the school, Windsor Park Collegiate, was Mr. D. M. Slater, and the faculty population was 27. The first school President was R. D. McClelland. The school had a population of 619, ranging from Grade 8 to Grade 12. 93 of the students were graduating that year." Taken from the 1978 Yearbook

Currently, Windsor Park Collegiate is a Grade 9-12 school. It harbors a staff force of 34 teachers and 40 support staff strive to maintain an environment that promotes student learning. The school offers an English Language Program.

== Architecture ==
The building was designed by local Winnipeg firm 'Green Blankstein Russell', and construction began in 1959. The design is notable for its use of multiple two-storey hexagonal pods joined by hallways. The only other school know to feature the "unique hexagonal architecture" is Donald D. Lum Elementary School in Alameda, California, which opened in 1961. A larger gym, designed by firm 'Duncan Rattray Peters Searle' was later added in 1969.

Windsor Park Collegiate was built during the Cold War, and rumors of a large bomb shelter in the foundation of the school have been propagated by students, staff and alumni for decades. Despite the school being constructed with a large, open area in its foundation, there is no evidence that it was ever designed as any sort of bomb shelter. This unused underground space is accessible though a crawlspace near the former basement cafeteria, and a door near the main gym changing rooms.

== Special Needs Program ==
WPC has the largest secondary school Special Needs program in the Louis Riel School Division. It is technically termed the Co-op Education Program and the Skills for Living Program. This program works with integration into standard classes, as well as work experience and life skills training.

=== Bistro in the Park ===
In 1999, the program opened up Crackers The Bistro, a full-service restaurant that was open to the public for lunch 5 days a week. Here they train and "employ" exclusively the students who are in the Occupational Skills Program within the Louis Riel School Division. It is located in a residential strip mall very close to WPC. The program was a great success in reaching its goals, but is still operated largely off donations and public funding. In 1999 this program won the Manitoba School Board Innovation Award. As of July 2006 the restaurant was renamed Bistro in the Park.

== 50th Anniversary Celebration and Reunion ==
A 50th anniversary celebration and reunion was held on May 13–14, 2011. Many past students and staff attended the two-day celebration. A "Hall of Honour" was established and three people were inducted at the Gala Dinner. Butch Goring, Jennifer Jones and Evelyn Jacks.

== Notable alumni ==
- Cam Connor - professional NHL hockey player and Stanley Cup winner with the Montreal Canadiens, New York Rangers and Edmonton Oilers. Also appeared on Wipeout Canada.
- Robert "Butch" Goring - professional NHL hockey player, notable for winning 4 consecutive Stanley Cup with the New York Islanders.
- Jennifer Jones - Professional Curler, 2014 Sochi Winter Olympics Gold Medallist
- "Rowdy" Roddy Piper WWE Legend and Hall of famer
- Mike Ridley - professional NHL hockey player with New York Rangers, Washington Capitals, Toronto Maple Leafs and Vancouver Canucks
- Dave Richter - played 365 games as an NHL defenceman with Minnesota North Stars, Philadelphia Flyers, Vancouver Canucks, and St. Louis Blues.
