= Gray Academy of Jewish Education =

Coordinates: 49.8723°N 97.2094°W

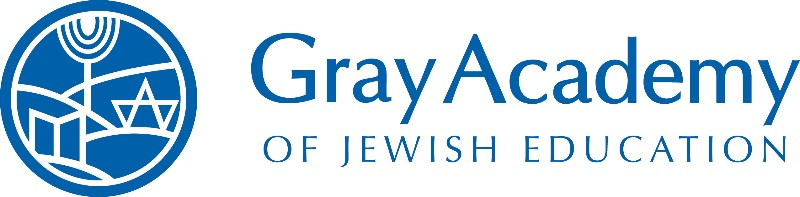

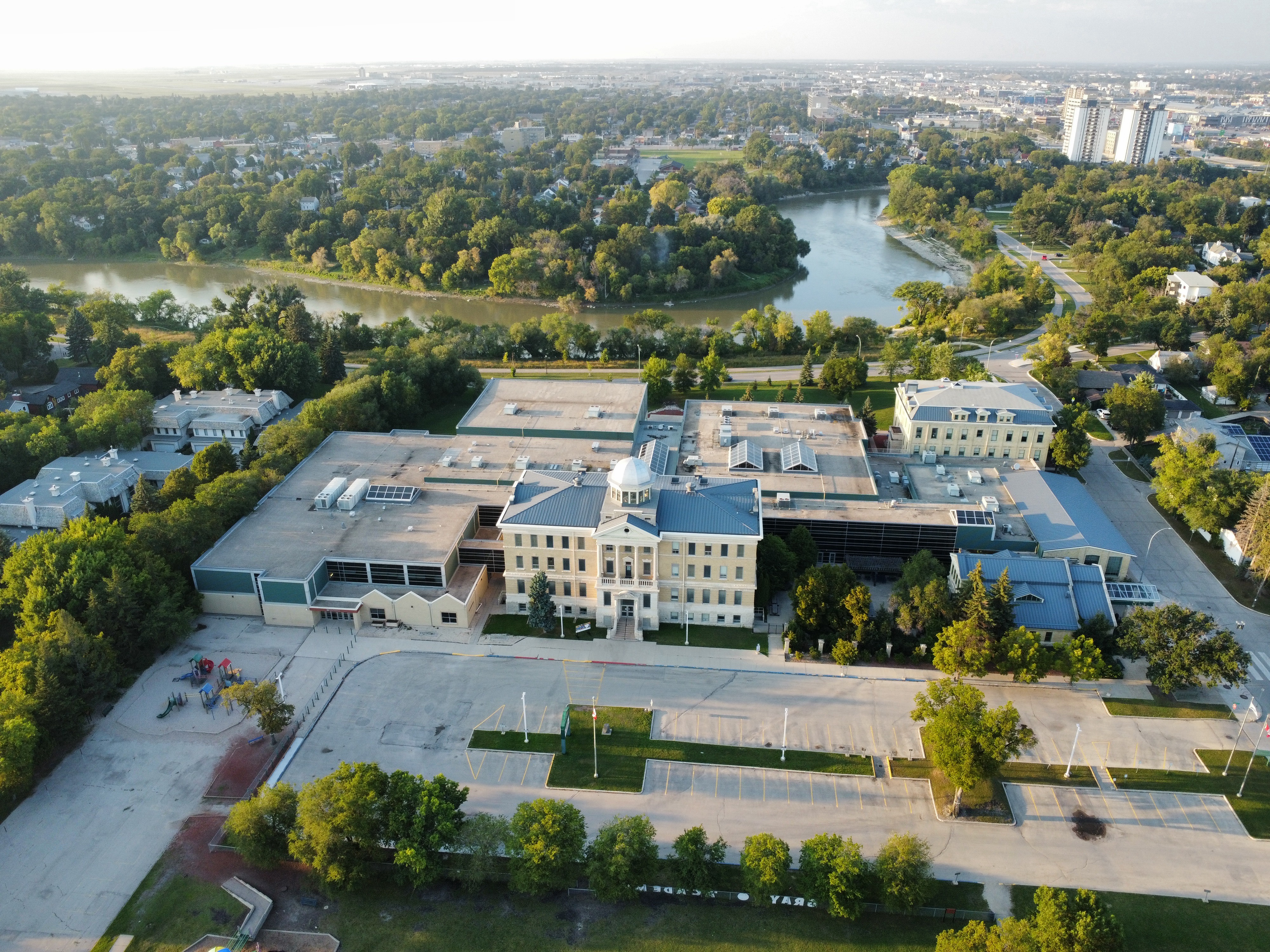
- 123 Doncaster St, Winnipeg, Manitoba

Information
- Established: 1997
- School board: Winnipeg Board of Jewish Education
- President: Jonathan Strauss
- Head of school: Lori Binder
- Grades: Nursery–12
- Enrollment: 490
- School fees: $14,000 CAD
- Website: grayacademy.ca

The Gray Academy of Jewish Education is a pluralistic Jewish day school in Winnipeg, Manitoba, and the only K–12 Jewish day school in western Canada.

The trustee and policy-making body of the school is the Winnipeg Board of Jewish Education, which is a member of the Canadian Accredited Independent Schools and the Manitoba Federation of Independent Schools.

== History ==
The Gray Academy was founded in 1997 as a result of the amalgamation of three schools.

The first formal Jewish education in Manitoba originated in 1902 with the establishment of Winnipeg's first Jewish studies program (Talmud Torah), initiated at King Edward School on Selkirk Avenue. It would not be until 1907, however, that a physical building for the Talmud Torah was built, established by Chief Rabbi Israel Isaac Kahanovitch as the Winnipeg Hebrew Free School-Talmud Torah (Winnipeg Hebrew School), located at the corner of Dufferin and Aikins in the city's North End.

Seven years later, in 1914, the Aberdeen School (later the I. L. Peretz School) was established as a secular Yiddish-language school. Within its first year, 92 students were enrolled, and the school relocated to a building on McKenzie Street. In 1927, Zionists split off from the school to form the Jewish Folk School on St. Johns Avenue to provide more emphasis on Zionism and Hebrew instruction; however, they rejoined with I. L. Peretz School in 1944 to form the I. L. Peretz Folk School (ILPFS).

In 1959, Rabbi Avbraham Kravetz (1914–1962) became the new principal of the Talmud Torah, which saw exponential growth following World War II. That year, under his leadership, the school moved to Matheson Avenue and opened Joseph Wolinsky Collegiate, offering full-day classes that include general and Judaic studies for grades 8 through 11. Also that year was the opening of the Ramah Hebrew School, a grade 1 to 6 Jewish day school at Lanark and Grant in River Heights, accommodating a growing Jewish population in the city's south end.

Declining enrolment and rising costs during the 1980s led to the closure of ILPFS and its absorption by the Talmud Torah, forming the Talmud Torah-I. L. Peretz Folk School at the Matheson Avenue location.

In 1997, the Winnipeg Board of Jewish Education amalgamated the three schools—Talmud Torah-I.L. Peretz Folk School, Joseph Wolinsky Collegiate, and Ramah Hebrew School—into the new Gray Academy of Jewish Education at the new Asper Jewish Community Campus (built by Israel Asper) in the Tuxedo area, thereby becoming the center of all parochial Jewish education in Winnipeg. At this time, Gray Academy had three divisions: Shore Early Years School, Simkin Middle School, and Joseph Wolinsky Collegiate. However, in 2004, the three divisions amalgamated to become a single school—the Gray Academy of Jewish Education.

=== I. L. Peretz Folk School ===
The I. L. Peretz Folk School (ILPFS) was a secular Yiddish-language school in Winnipeg's Jewish district.

Beginning in two rented classrooms at Aberdeen School under the banner of the Jewish Radical School, it was established in 1914 immediately following the Jewish population's surge in Winnipeg's North End caused by anti-semitic pogroms in Russia that peaked in the 1880s. Within its first year, 92 students were enrolled, and the school relocated to a building on McKenzie Street. It was subsequently renamed the I. L. Peretz School in 1915, named for the iconic Yiddish author and playwright Isaac Leib Peretz (1852–1915), also known as Yitskhok Leybush Peretz.

With continued rise in enrollment, the school moved to Burrows Avenue in 1917, then to Aberdeen Avenue in 1922. In 1927, Zionists split off from the school to form the Jewish Folk School on St. Johns Avenue to provide more emphasis on Zionism and Hebrew instruction. In the 1930s, the school on Aberdeen Avenue was expanded, becoming the largest K–12 Jewish day school in North America.

As the city's Jewish population grew, notably during the post-World War II years, many middle-class families began purchasing homes in the new suburban housing developments in the northwest area of West Kildonan (and district of the city at the time). The development known as Garden City rapidly became populous enough to justify the building of a second school.

In 1944, the Jewish Folk School rejoined with I. L. Peretz School on Aberdeen Avenue to become the I. L. Peretz Folk School. By the following decade, the school expanded to include satellite campuses, on Aikins Street in 1950 and Jefferson Avenue in 1956.

Throughout its history, the I.L. Peretz Folk School held co-educational classes in both Yiddish and English through grade 7. Declining enrolment and rising costs during the 1980s led to its closing and absorption by the Talmud Torah to form the Talmud Torah-I. L. Peretz Folk School at the Matheson Avenue location. The school created a Yiddish-language track to accommodate those interested in continuing education in Yiddish.

== Notable alumni ==
I. L. Peretz Folk School

- Isadore Coop (1926–2003), Canadian architect
- Velvl Greene (1928–2011), Canadian-American-Israeli scientist and academic
