= West Kildonan Collegiate =

Location
- 101 Ridgecrest Avenue; Winnipeg, Manitoba, R2V 4T6; Canada; 49.9541°N 97.0934°W

Information
- School type: Public High School
- Principal: Adam Hildebrandt
- Grades: 9-12
- Enrollment: 1000
- Language: English
- Area: West Kildonan
- Colours: Dark Blue and White
- Team name: Wolverines
- Website: www.7oaks.org/school/westkildonan/

West Kildonan Collegiate (WKC) is a high school in Winnipeg, Manitoba which hosts students from grades 9-12. It is part of the Seven Oaks School Division, and houses over 1000 students.

The school decided in June 2007 to change the school's name from "West Kildonan Collegiate Institute" to simply "West Kildonan Collegiate". The students of West Kildonan moved into its new school building in March 2008. The new school is located in a new subdivision called River Ridge, which is near the sub-divisions of Rivergrove and Riverbend. The new school is located at 101 Ridgecrest Avenue, off Main Street.

== Notable alumni ==
- Randy Bachman, musician
- Adam Brooks, professional ice hockey player
- Keegan Kolesar, professional ice hockey player
- Cody Glass, professional ice hockey player
- Desiree Scott, professional soccer player
- Twomad, YouTuber (deceased)

== See also ==
- Seven Oaks School Division
