= Franco-Manitoban School Division =

French-language school division in Manitoba, Canada

Division scolaire franco-manitobaine

Location
- 1263 Dawson Road; Lorette, Manitoba; R0A 0Y0 Winnipeg, Île-des-Chênes, La Broquerie, Laurier, Lorette, Notre-Dame-de-Lourdes, Sainte-Agathe, Sainte-Anne-des-Chênes, Saint-Claude, Saint-Jean-Baptiste, Saint-Georges, Saint-Laurent, Saint-Lazare, Saint-Pierre-Jolys, Shilo, Thompson. Canada
- Coordinates: 54.3°N 97.3°W

District information
- Motto: Apprendre et grandir ensemble
- Superintendent: Alain Laberge
- Chair of the board: Bernard Lesage
- Schools: 23

Students and staff
- Students: 5666 (septembre 2018)

Other information
- Elected trustees: Bernard Lesage, Denis Clément, Yolande Dupuis, Sylvie Schmitt, Michel Simard, Roxane Dupuis, Rhéal Gagnon, Joanne Colliou, Guy Gagnon, Alain Jacques, Lisbeth Savard.
- Website: www.dsfm.mb.ca

The Franco-Manitoban School Division (French: Division scolaire franco-manitobaine) is a school division in Manitoba, Canada offering French-language education to its students. The right to French education was gained through Section 23 of the Canadian Charter of Rights and Freedoms. The Division was formed in 1994, following court challenges that established the rights of minority-language groups in Canada to separate education systems.

== 23 Schools in the Division ==
- Centre scolaire Léo-Rémillard (Grade: 9-12) Winnipeg
- Collège Louis-Riel (Grade: 7-12) Winnipeg
- École communautaire Aurèle-Lemoine (Grade: K-12) Saint-Laurent
- École Christine-Lespérance (Grade: K-8) Winnipeg
- École/Collège régional Gabrielle-Roy (Grade: K-12) Île-des-Chênes
- École communautaire Gilbert-Rosset (Grade: K-12) Saint-Claude
- École Jours de Plaine (Grade: K-12) Laurier
- École La Source (Grade: K-12) Shilo
- École communautaire La Voie du Nord (Grade: K-8) Thompson
- École Lacerte (Grade: K-8) Winnipeg
- École Lagimodière (Grade: K-8) Lorette
- École Noël-Ritchot (Grade: K-8) Winnipeg
- École régional Notre-Dame (Grade: K-12) Notre-Dame-de-Lourdes
- École Pointe-des-Chênes (Grade: K-12) Sainte-Anne-des-Chênes
- École Précieux-Sang (Grade: K-8) Winnipeg
- École communautaire Réal-Bérard (Grade: K-12) Saint-Pierre-Jolys
- École Roméo-Dallaire (Grade: K-9) Winnipeg
- École Sainte-Agathe (Grade: K-9) Sainte-Agathe
- École communautaire Saint-Georges (Grade: K-12) Saint-Georges
- École régionale Saint-Jean-Baptiste (Grade: K-12) Saint-Jean-Baptiste
- École Saint-Joachim (Grade: K-12) La Broquerie
- École Saint-Lazare (Grade: K-12) Saint-Lazare
- École Taché (Grade: K-6) Winnipeg

== Adult Education Centre ==
- Centre d'apprentissage franco-manitobain (CAFM)

== See also ==
- List of school districts in Manitoba
