= Glenlawn Collegiate =

Location
- 770 St. Mary's Road; Winnipeg, Manitoba, R2M 3N7; Canada; 49.8527°N 97.1128°W

Information
- Type: Public secondary (English language)
- Established: 1923
- School district: Louis Riel School Division
- Principal: Carly Friesen
- Grades: 9–12
- Enrollment: 1100 (2024)
- Campus: Suburban
- Mascot: Arthur the Lion
- Website: www.lrsd.net/schools/GCI/

Glenlawn Collegiate is a public English-language secondary school in Winnipeg, Manitoba, Canada, located at 770 St. Mary's Road, Elm Park in the suburb of St. Vital. It is part of the Louis Riel School Division.

== Notable alumni ==
- Obie Baizley: Progressive Conservative member of the Legislative Assembly of Manitoba, cabinet minister under Dufferin Roblin and Walter Weir.
- Reid Carruthers: World Men's Curling Champion
- Edward Connery: Progressive Conservative member of the Legislative Assembly of Manitoba, cabinet minister under Gary Filmon.
- Gabriel Langois: Known affectionately as "Dancing Gabe" by Winnipeg sports fans.
- Nigel Dawes: Professional hockey player.
- Gerald Ducharme: Progressive Conservative member of the Legislative Assembly of Manitoba, cabinet minister under Gary Filmon.
- Laurie Hawn: Member of Parliament
- Henry Janzen: CFL player
- Jim Peebles: Won the Nobel Prize in Physics
- Adam Smoluk: Actor, Screenwriter, and Director
