= École Provencher =

Location
- 320, avenue de la Cathédrale; Winnipeg, Manitoba, R2H 0J4; Canada; 49.8907°N 97.1138°W

Information
- School type: Public Elementary School
- Established: 1818; 208 years ago
- School board: Louis Riel School Division
- Superintendent: Christian Michalik
- Principal: Lynn Caron-Plischke Stéfan Herrington (Vice-Principal)
- Staff: 20 Teachers, 16 Support Staff
- Grades: Kindergarten to 4
- Enrollment: 285
- Language: French Immersion
- Area: Saint Boniface
- Colours: Orange and Green
- Mascot: Miel
- Website: www.lrsd.net/schools/Provencher/

École Provencher is the oldest school in Saint Boniface, Winnipeg, Manitoba.

rom its earliest beginnings in 1818 under the guidance of Father Provencher, the school has occupied various sites in St. Boniface. In 1906, École Provencher found its current and permanent home at the corner of rue St. Jean Baptiste and avenue de la Cathédrale.

Originally part of the St. Boniface School Division, École Provencher is now within the Louis Riel School Division. Students from Kindergarten to grade 4 are schooled in the French Immersion program, continuing the tradition set by the founders of receiving instruction in both official languages. The school also houses independent day-care facilities and nursery school programs.

Acclaimed author Gabrielle Roy, a Grade 1 teacher at École Provencher, taught there from 1930 to 1936.

== Notable alumni ==
- Earl Dawson – politician and president of the Manitoba and Canadian Amateur Hockey Associations
