= Louis Riel Arts and Technology Centre =

Location
- 5 DeBourmont Ave; Winnipeg, Manitoba, R2M; Canada; 49.8724°N 97.0815°W

Information
- School type: Public, Secondary school, Vocational school
- Founded: 2002
- School board: Louis Riel School Division
- Grades: Grades 11 and 12
- Enrollment: 284
- Language: English
- Colours: Black and Red
- Website: ATC's Website

Louis Riel Arts and Technology Centre also commonly referred to as ATC, is a vocational high school in Winnipeg, Manitoba, Canada with an enrolment of 284 students as of 2020.
