= Calvin Christian Collegiate =

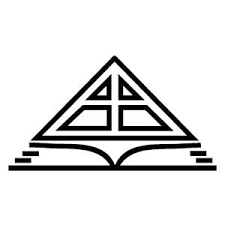

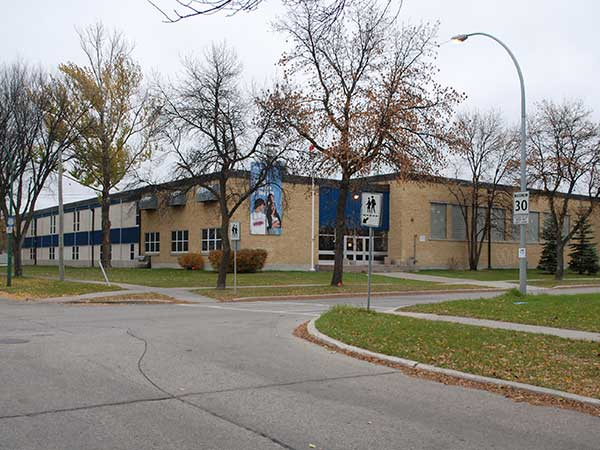

Location
- 706 Day Street; Winnipeg, Manitoba, R2C 1B6; Canada; 49.8987°N 97.0023°W

Information
- School type: Private Junior and Senior high school
- Motto: A school you can believe in
- Religious affiliation: Christian (non-denominational)
- Founded: 1960, 2002
- School board: Mark Booy (chair)
- Principal: Vanessa Luloff
- Staff: ~30
- Grades: 7-12
- Enrollment: ~250
- Language: English, French.
- Area: Transcona, Winnipeg
- Colors: Yellow, Black
- Team name: Eagles
- Website: calvinchristian.mb.ca
- Last updated: June 22, 2026

Calvin Christian Collegiate is a high school in Transcona, Manitoba, Canada. Calvin was opened in 2002 and delivers education from a Christian perspective.

== Overview ==
Calvin Christian Collegiate was established in 2002 to extend the educational program at Calvin Christian School into the high school years. The former Park Circle Secondary School in Transcona was purchased in the early months of 2002, renovations were undertaken and by September the school was ready for occupancy. The grade 7 to 9 population from the Sutton Avenue campus was moved to the new location and grade 10 was added that year. In subsequent years grade 11 and 12 were added.

== Organisation History ==
Calvin Christian School comes from a Reformed religious and philosophical tradition dating back to the 1800s. It originally had strong denominational connections with Reformed churches and remains strongly influenced by reformed theology. In the late 1950s, a group of Dutch immigrants worked together to establish a Christian school. All of these immigrants were from the Christian Reformed Churches in Winnipeg and that gave the school a Dutch Calvinist background. However, due to the Reformed traditions and philosophical perspectives regarding church connections, Calvin Christian School has been interdenominational since its founding. The founders associated themselves with The Greater Winnipeg Society of Christian Education and set about planning what would become Calvin Christian School. They built a seven-room school that opened its doors in September 1960 to 65 students in the North Kildonan area. Today, 60 churches are represented within the student body. The philosophy of today is characterized as small "r" reformed because it is not about a connection to a Reformed Church, it is about a philosophical connection to early reformed thinkers.

== Building History ==
By the late 1980s, portable classrooms had multiplied around the original North Kildonan building and it was necessary to accommodate the growth. Property was acquired to the east of the building, and construction began in 1989. Eight classrooms were added to the east side of the building, and a new library, multipurpose room, administrative area and gymnasium were added to the west side. The original building was between the two new wings, and was renovated in the summer of 1990. Space again became a problem in the late 1990s. In 1997, that gave rise to the construction of the north wing, which included a computer lab, two more classrooms, and a staff room.

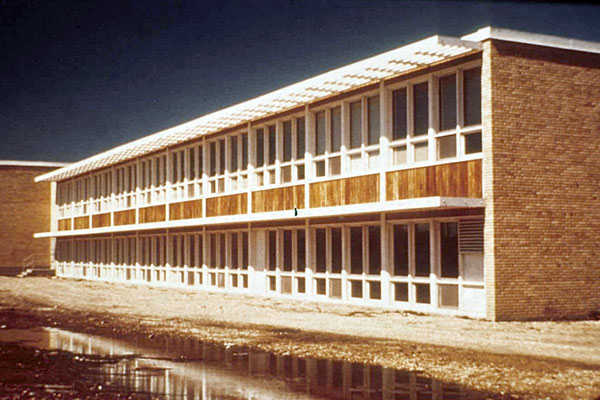
Photo of 706 Day Street as Transcona Collegiate

Needing more space, the school took over 706 Day Street in Transcona. This was to both alleviate growing pains and to also house Calvin's first-ever high school program. In September 2002, it opened the doors to Calvin Christian Collegiate, the school's second campus, housing Grades 7 to 9 and the newly created 10 to 12 program.

706 Day Street was built in 1956 for $330,000 with 18-rooms and an auditorium. The building was home to the Transcona Collegiate

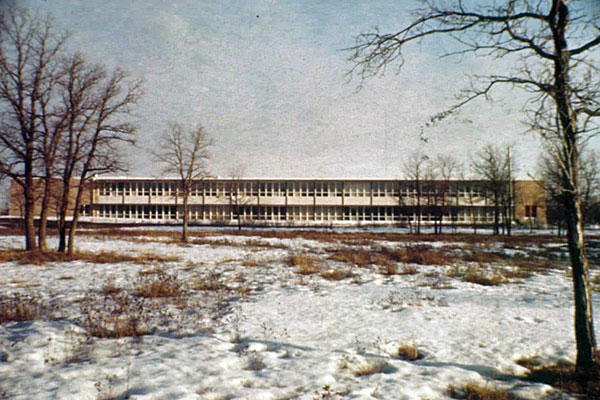
Photo of 706 Day Street as Transcona Collegiate

Institute before its move off of Winona Street in 1961. After which it became the Transcona Junior High School which was later renamed to Arthur Day Junior High School which moved to Whitehall Boulevard in 1969. In 1970 the building was occupied by the Central North Upgrading Centre which was renamed in 1977 as the Park Circle Secondary School, it closed in 2000. The building has since then been occupied by Calvin Christian Collegiate.

In 2014 Calvin decided to replace the auditorium which was being used as the gym with a new gym, repurposing the space as a drama and multipurpose room. Costing $3,200,000, the addition added

14,000sqft to the building, the gym consists of change rooms, public washrooms, storage areas, kitchen, weight room, gymnasium office and entrance foyer. The addition was opened in October 2015.

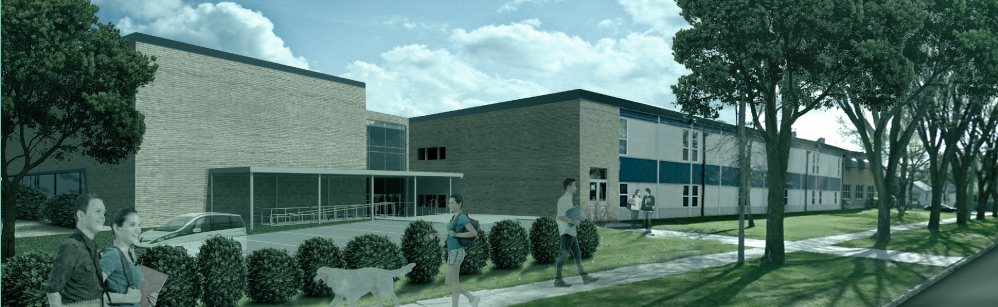
The artists render of the gym expansion at 706 Day Street

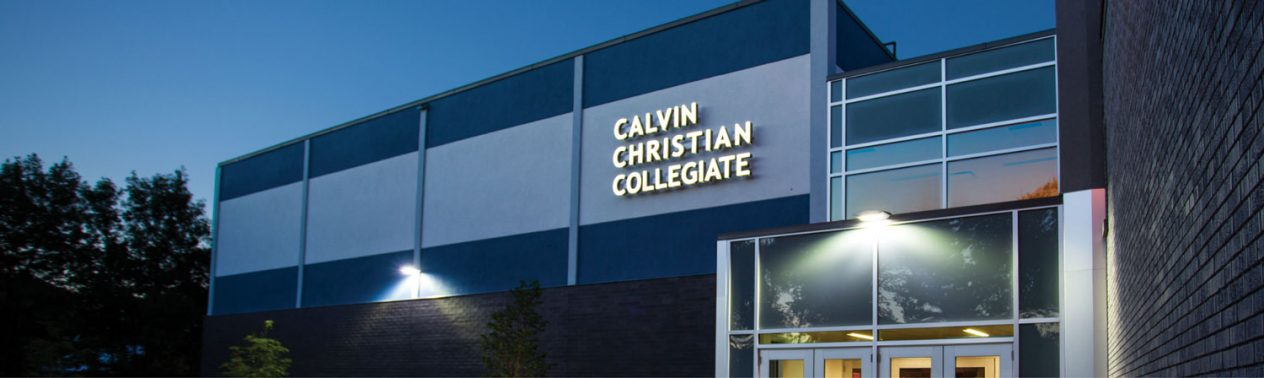
Photo of the gym addition to 706 Day Street

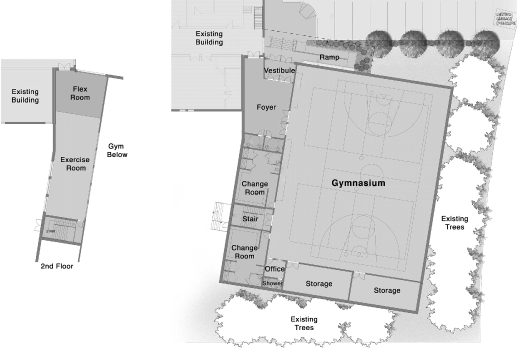
The floorplan for the gym expansion at 706 Day Street

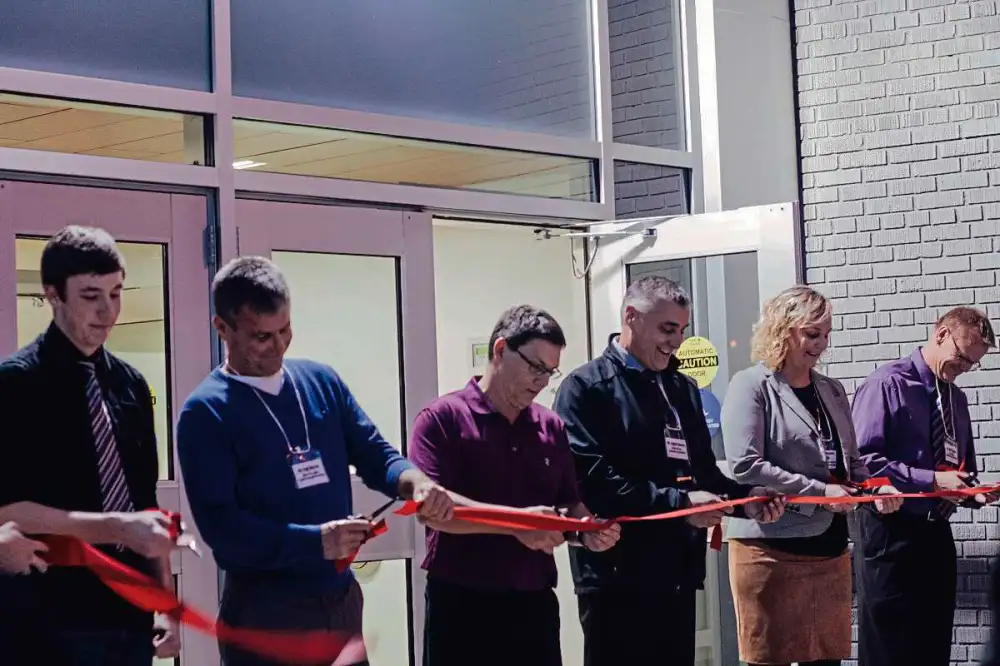
The ribbon cutting at the grand opening of the gym expansion at 706 Day Street
