= Maples Collegiate =

Location
- 1330 Jefferson Avenue; Winnipeg, Manitoba, R2P 1L3; Canada; 49.9541°N 97.1731°W

Information
- School type: Public
- Founded: May 21, 1980
- School district: Seven Oaks School Division
- Superintendent: Tony Kreml
- Principal: Melissa Delaronde
- Grades: 9-12
- Enrollment: 1355
- Language: English
- Colours: Silver, Black
- Team name: Marauders
- Website: www.7oaks.org/school/maples

Maples Collegiate is a public high school in Winnipeg, Manitoba which goes from grades 9 to 12. It is a part of the Seven Oaks School Division. The Maples Met High School is located in the same building as the regular high school.

== Notable alumni ==
- Tanya Dubnicoff, medalist in track cycling
- Justin Duff, Canadian volleyball player
- Krzysztof Soszynski, UFC fighter
