= Collège Béliveau, Winnipeg =

Collège Béliveau
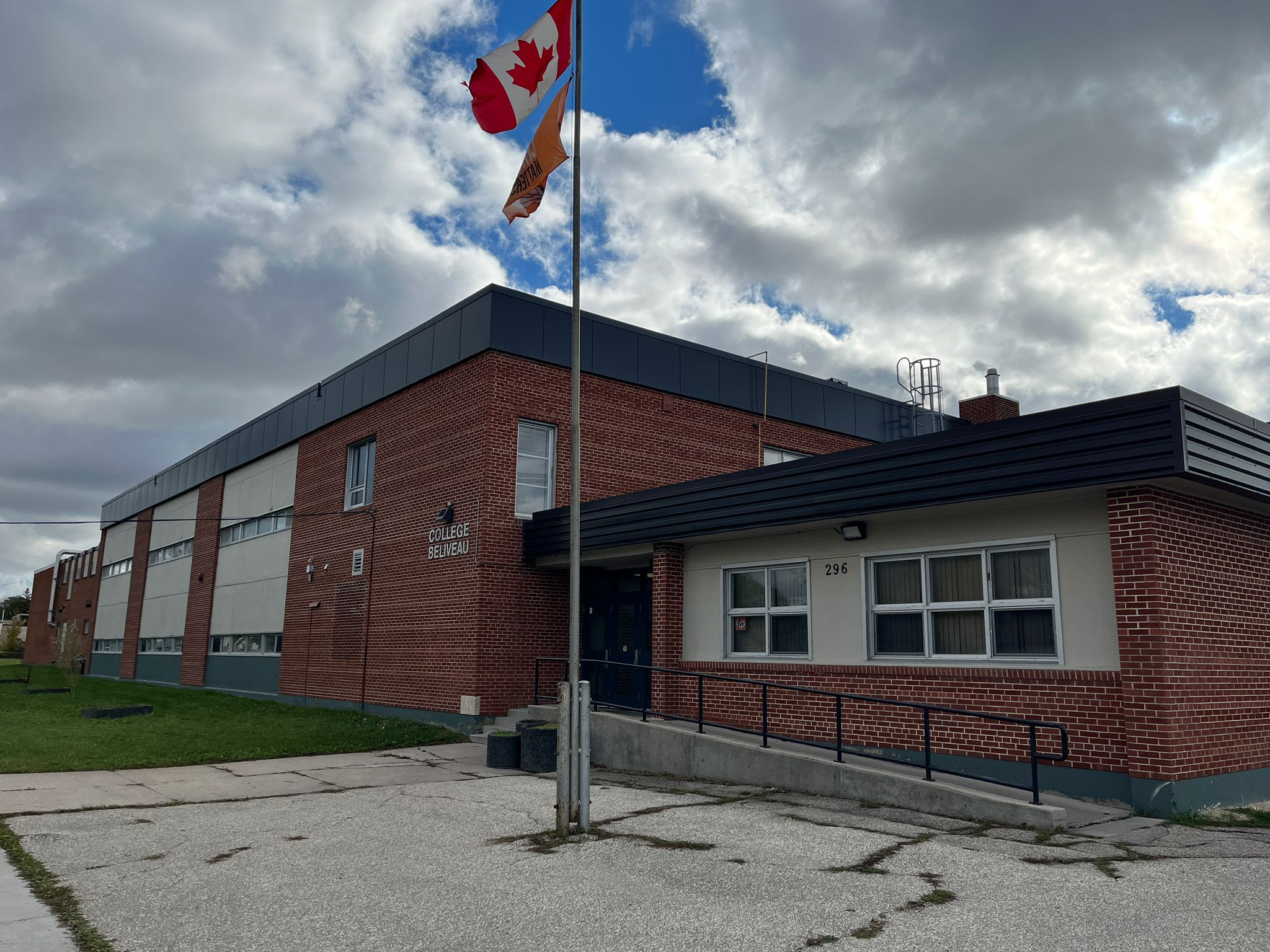

Location
- 296 Speers Road; Winnipeg, Manitoba, R2J 1M7; Canada
- Coordinates: 49.8630°N 97.0713°W

Information
- School type: Public, Secondary School
- School board: Louis Riel School Division
- Superintendent: Christian Michalik
- Principal: Andrea Kolody
- Staff: 35 Teachers
- Grades: Grades 7-12
- Enrollment: 600
- Language: French Immersion
- Area: Windsor Park
- Colours: Red and Black
- Mascot: Barry the Barracuda
- Team name: Barracudas
- Website: www.lrsd.net/schools/CB/

Collège Béliveau is a grades 7 to 12 French immersion school with 42 teachers serving approximately 679 students. It was the first French immersion centre in Western Canada after its conversion from English in 1982.

== Notable alumni ==
- Tyler Blashko Member of the Legislative Assembly of Manitoba for Lagimodière
- Riley Cote, a professional ice hockey player
- Wab Kinew, Premier of Manitoba, Leader of the Manitoba NDP
- Mike Ridley, professional ice hockey player
- David Baszucki, CEO of Roblox.

== Feeder schools ==
Collège Béliveau draws its population from five feeder schools: École Guyot, École Henri-Bergeron, École Howden, École Van Belleghem, and École Provencher. There is also the possibility of out of catchment transfers via special request.
