= Ohr HaTorah Day School =

Location
- Winnipeg, Manitoba; Canada; 49.859°N 97.189°W

Information
- School type: Private Jewish day school
- Grades: Grades N–8
- Language: Hebrew, English

Ohr HaTorah Day School was an Orthodox Jewish day school, located in the River Heights neighbourhood of Winnipeg, Manitoba, Canada. It existed between 1998 - 2011, when it closed due to declining enrollment.

The school was founded in 1998 by a group of parents who were interested in a combination of high-level studies in both Torah and general subjects. They did not think such studies were available at other schools in Winnipeg.

== History ==
Rabbi Yaacov Benamou was the first principal of Ohr HaTorah. He was also serving as Senior Rabbi at the Herzlia-Adas Yeshurun Synagogue, which hosted the school.

The school combined Judaic, Hebrew and general studies, emphasizing Torah values and Zionism. Ohr HaTorah was funded by parents' tuition, the Manitoba Education Ministry, the Jewish Federation of Winnipeg, and Torah Umesorah, a national Jewish organization in the United States that had developed Jewish schools in North America since 1944.

Ohr HaTorah Day School also operated a full-day day care and a nursery school. Most of the nursery school students continued at Ohr HaTorah, while a minority moved on to other Jewish or public schools.

Ohr HaTorah started the 2008–09 academic year with about 60 students, ranging in age from 2 years to grade 4, after a 100% growth between 2003 and 2007, at a time of a drop in enrollment in other Jewish schools in Winnipeg. But in 2009 the administration closed the grade school, leaving only the pre-school and Kindergarten classes, numbering about 40 students. In June 2011 the school was completely shut down, due to financial difficulty and lack of enrollment.

The last principal of Ohr HaTorah was Rabbi Uriel Malka, who moved to Winnipeg with his family from Denver, Colorado, in 2008; he and his family were originally from Israel. Rabbi Malka served as Principal until 2009. He later died in the 2010 Mount Carmel forest fire. He and his wife were emissaries of the Jewish Agency. He had replaced Rabbi David Weksler.

Weksler moved back to Israel, where he serves as the principal of the Givat Shmuel elementary school in the Center District. Rabbi Weksler had succeeded Rabbi Amihai Bannett, who was the first emissary of the Jewish Agency at Ohr HaTorah school. Bannett is the CEO of Herzog Global, at Herzog College, after serving in the head office of the Jewish Agency's School Twinning Network and as the Director of Chidon HaTanach.

== List of principals ==
Principal	Term
Rabbi Yaacov Benamou	1998-2003
Rabbi Amihai Bannett	2003-2005
Rabbi David Weksler	2005-2008
Rabbi Uriel Malka	2008-2009
