= Centre scolaire Léo-Rémillard =

Coordinates: 49°48′57″N 97°04′38″W

- Winnipeg, Manitoba, Canada.

Information
- Established: October 16, 2007
- School district: Division Scolaire Franco-Manitobaine
- Grades: 9-12
- Website: https://leo-remillard.dsfm.mb.ca

Centre scolaire Léo-Rémillard (CSLR) is a French-language high school situated in the southeastern part of Winnipeg, Manitoba, in Canada. It currently offers grade 9 to grade 12. This school was built in honor of the writer Léo Rémillard, and it is part of the Division Scolaire Franco-Manitobaine.
