= Immanuel Christian School (Winnipeg) =

Location
- 215 Rougeau Avenue; Winnipeg, Manitoba, R2C 3Z9; Canada; 49.8929°N 97.0478°W

Information
- School type: Private
- Religious affiliation: Canadian Reformed Churches
- Founded: 1976
- Principal: Tim Vanderhooft
- Grades: Kindergarten - Grade 12
- Enrollment: 200+
- Language: English
- Colours: Navy Blue, White
- Mascot: ICS Falcon
- Team name: ICS Falcons
- Newspaper: I.C.S. Messenger
- Website: www.immanuelchristian.ca

Immanuel Christian School is an independent school located at 215 Rougeau Ave in Winnipeg, Manitoba, Canada. It was founded in 1976 by members of the Canadian Reformed Church. It has a Kindergarten to Grade 12 program and serves over 200 children. The sports teams participate in Manitoba's Zone 12 Athletic Division.

== Team sports ==
Immanuel Christian School takes part in several sports including cross country, volleyball, basketball, badminton, soccer, and track. They participate in Manitoba's Zone 12 Athletic Division.

== Facilities ==
The school has its own campus with standard facilities including a library, a computer lab, a music room, and a resource room. These are located on the two levels of the main building. The music room is located in Immanuel hall. A gymnasium has been added to accommodate the growing number of students and the expansion of the program. The school does not provide bussing, nor does it have a cafeteria.
