= St. Boniface Diocesan High School =

Location
- 282 Dubuc Street; Winnipeg, Manitoba, R2H 1E4; Canada; 49.8772°N 97.1143°W

Information
- School type: Parochial Independent English High School
- Motto: Amor Doctrinae Floreat (May the love of learning flourish)
- Religious affiliation: Catholic
- Founded: 1965
- Principal: Dexter Suban
- Grades: 9 - 12
- Language: English
- Area: Saint Boniface
- Colours: Green and Black
- Mascot: Centurion
- Team name: Centurions
- Website: www.sbdhs.net

St. Boniface Diocesan High School is an independent Catholic high school in Winnipeg, Manitoba, Canada. It was established in 1965 to provide Catholic high school education to English speaking students of the French Diocese of St. Boniface.

St. Boniface Diocesan High School had, throughout its history, Marianist Brothers and priests on staff. Between the years 1986 and 1989, the school operated as a Marianist school with a Marianist Rector. In April 1989, the school was incorporated as St. Boniface Diocesan High School Inc.

St. Boniface Diocesan High School now serves a broader community. It teaches students from the Archdiocese of Winnipeg, the Ukrainian Archeparchy of Winnipeg, and as well as non-Catholic students.
