= Springs Christian Academy =

Location
- 261 Youville Street; Winnipeg, Manitoba, R2H 2S7; Canada; 49.8805°N 97.1084°W

Information
- School type: Private religious co-educational
- Motto: Pursuing Christ. Pursuing Excellence.
- Religious affiliation: Christian
- Founded: 1989
- Grades: Preschool-12
- Enrollment: 500
- Language: English
- Colours: Blue, White
- Mascot: Eagle
- Team name: Eagles

Springs Christian Academy is a private Christian school in Winnipeg, Manitoba. It has two campuses; the first for students from Nursery to Grade 5 and the second for students from Grade 6 to Grade 12. The school was founded in 1989 by Springs of Living Water Church (now Springs Church) in Winnipeg. It has 500 students across both campuses.

Springs Christian Academy was the host site for the 2017 "AAA" MHSAA Varsity Boys Basketball Provincials. The tournament featured 8 teams and began on March 16 and ended on March 18. As hosts, Springs were ranked 8th and fell to the top ranked St. James Jimmies in the Quarter-Finals by a score of 68–62. Springs then lost to 5th ranked St. John's-Ravenscourt in the Consolation Semi-Finals by a score of 90–75. The Provincial Championship was eventually won by the 2nd ranked Neelin Spartans by a score of 89–48 over the 4th ranked Linden Christian Wings.
