= Sportsplex =

Sportsplex is a name used by several sports complexes or leisure centres. It may refer to:

== Canada ==
- Brandon Community Sportsplex, Brandon, Manitoba
- CN Sportplex, Moncton, New Brunswick
- Dartmouth Sportsplex, Dartmouth, Nova Scotia
- ENMAX Centre, Lethbridge (formerly the Canada Games Sportsplex)
- Nepean Sportsplex, Ottawa

== United States ==
- Bellingham Sportsplex, Bellingham, Washington
- Centennial Sportsplex, Nashville, Tennessee
- Darien Sportsplex Ice Arena, Darien, Illinois
- Mecklenburg County Sportsplex, Matthews, North Carolina
- Orange Beach Sportsplex, Orange Beach, Alabama
- The Podium, Spokane, Washington
- Taylor Sportsplex, Taylor, Michigan
- Virginia Beach Sportsplex, Virginia Beach, Virginia

== See also ==
- Sports complex
