= Superior Propane Centre =

Multi-purpose arena in Moncton, New Brunswick, Canada

Coordinates: 46°05′44″N 64°49′03″W

The logo of the Red Ball Internet Centre

The Greenfoot Energy 4-Plex is a multi-purpose arena in Moncton, New Brunswick which opened on November 8, 2003, with four NHL-sized ice surfaces, one of which (the Champions Arena) has seating for 1,500 spectators. It was home to the Moncton Beavers of the Maritime Junior A Hockey League until 2007 when they moved to Dieppe and became the Dieppe Commandos. It is the home of the Moncton Mariposa Figure Skating Club, the Moncton Minor Hockey Association the Moncton Ringette Association and Lacrosse Moncton. The facility also contains a pro shop, full-service restaurant, coffee shop and meeting facilities.

The Greenfoot Energy 4-Plex is part of the CN Sportplex, which also consists of 10 ballfields, six soccer fields and an indoor air supported multipurpose sports dome (The Moncton Sports Dome).

== Former Names ==
- Superior Propane Centre
- Red Ball Internet Centre
- Tim Hortons 4 Ice Centre

== See also ==
- Moncton Sport Facilities
