= Andrews Field (disambiguation) =

Andrews Field may refer to:

- Joint Base Andrews in the US
  - Andrews Air Force Base, within Joint Base Andrews
- RAF Andrews Field in England
- Andrews Field (baseball), a baseball stadium in Brandon, Manitoba, Canada
- Andrews Field (Norwalk, Connecticut), a sports facility in Norwalk, Connecticut
