= Chris Bauman =

Canadian football player (born 1984)

No. 83
- Position: WR / SB

Personal information
- Born: Brandon, Manitoba, Canada
- Listed height: 6 ft 4 in (1.93 m)
- Listed weight: 212 lb (96 kg)

Career information
- High school: Vincent Massey
- University: Regina
- CFL draft: 2007: 1st round, 1st overall pick

Career history
- 2007–2010: Hamilton Tiger-Cats
- 2011: Edmonton Eskimos
- 2012–2014: Calgary Stampeders

Awards and highlights
- Grey Cup champion (2014)

Chris Bauman is a Canadian former professional football wide receiver-slotback who played in the Canadian Football League (CFL). He was drafted first overall by the Hamilton Tiger-Cats in the 2007 CFL draft. He played CIS football for the Regina Rams and was the first player from the University of Regina to be selected first overall in the CFL draft.

== Amateur career ==
Bauman played four seasons for the University of Regina Rams in the CIS. Prior to playing for the Rams, he suited up for the Winnipeg Rifles of the Canadian Junior Football League in 2003 and played football at Vincent Massey High School in Brandon.

== Professional career ==
Bauman was the first overall pick of the 2007 CFL draft. During his rookie season in the CFL, he had 30 receptions for 370 yards.

On February 1, 2011, Bauman was released by the Tiger-Cats, two weeks before he was set to become a free agent. Soon after, he signed with the Edmonton Eskimos and spent one year with them before being released on January 12, 2012.

Bauman was then signed by the Calgary Stampeders on January 19, 2012.
