= Manitoba Emergency Services College =

Emergency services training facility in Canada

Coordinates: 49.8393°N 99.9181°W

The Manitoba Emergency Services College (MESC) is an emergency services training facility located in Brandon, Manitoba. It offers educational programs for current or potential firefighters and paramedics.

The MESC is governed by the Office of the Fire Commissioner. Selected courses are available online, but most are delivered at the facility in Brandon.

== History ==
The MESC was first opened as the Manitoba Fire College in 1985. At that time, it served as a training facility for professional firefighters. The school changed its name to Manitoba Emergency Services College in 1994. Since its founding, over 900 people have graduated from the program.

== Programs ==
There are multiple training streams available at MESC. The majority of students complete one of the two Public Programs: the Public Fire Paramedic Program (PFPP) or the Public Emergency Responder Certificate Program (PERC). PFPP is a 10-month diploma program that accepts 40 students per year. It includes courses in fire-fighting, primary care paramedicine, pump-truck operation, water rescue, hazardous material management, safety education, fire inspection, incident command, rescue practices, vehicle extrication, and career skills. PERC is a 6-month paramedic certification program held in Winnipeg. It includes courses in primary care paramedicine, ambulance operation, hazardous material management, incident command, rescue practices, career skills, and trauma care.

Other programs offered by MESC include search-and-rescue, canine search-and-rescue, and applied disaster and emergency studies certificates.

== Accreditation ==
MESC has 29 accredited courses: 28 accredited by the National Fire Protection Association, and one by the Canadian Medical Association. The college as a whole has had International Fire Service Accreditation Congress (IFSAC) accreditation since 1994 and received National Board on Fire Service Professional Qualifications (ProBoard) accreditation in 2010.
