= Brandon School Division =

School district in Manitoba, Canada

Coordinates: 49.834°N 99.945°W

The Brandon School Division is a school division in Brandon, Manitoba. It is overseen by a board of nine trustees. The Brandon School Division boundary extends beyond the boundaries of the City of Brandon and includes parts of the municipalities of Cornwallis, Riverdale, Elton, Oakland-Wawanesa, North Cypress-Langford, Glenboro-South Cypress and Whitehead as well as Canadian Forces Base Shilo.

Elementary schools are: Alexander School (Alexander), Betty Gibson School, Earl Oxford School, George Fitton School, Green Acres School, Harrison Middle School, J. R. Reid School, King George School, Kirkcaldy Heights School, Linden Lanes School, Maryland Park School, Meadows School, École New Era School, École O'Kelly School (CFB Shilo), Riverheights School, Riverview School, St. Augustine School, Valleyview School, and Waverly Park School.

Secondary schools are: Crocus Plains Regional Secondary School, École Neelin High School, and Vincent Massey High School. In 2007, Brandon School Division added Prairie Hope High School as an alternative school setting for students, particularly those over 18, who are at risk of discontinuing their education.

== See also ==
- List of school districts in Manitoba
