= CN Sportplex =

Recreation facility in Moncton, New Brunswick

Coordinates: 46.094°N 64.818°W

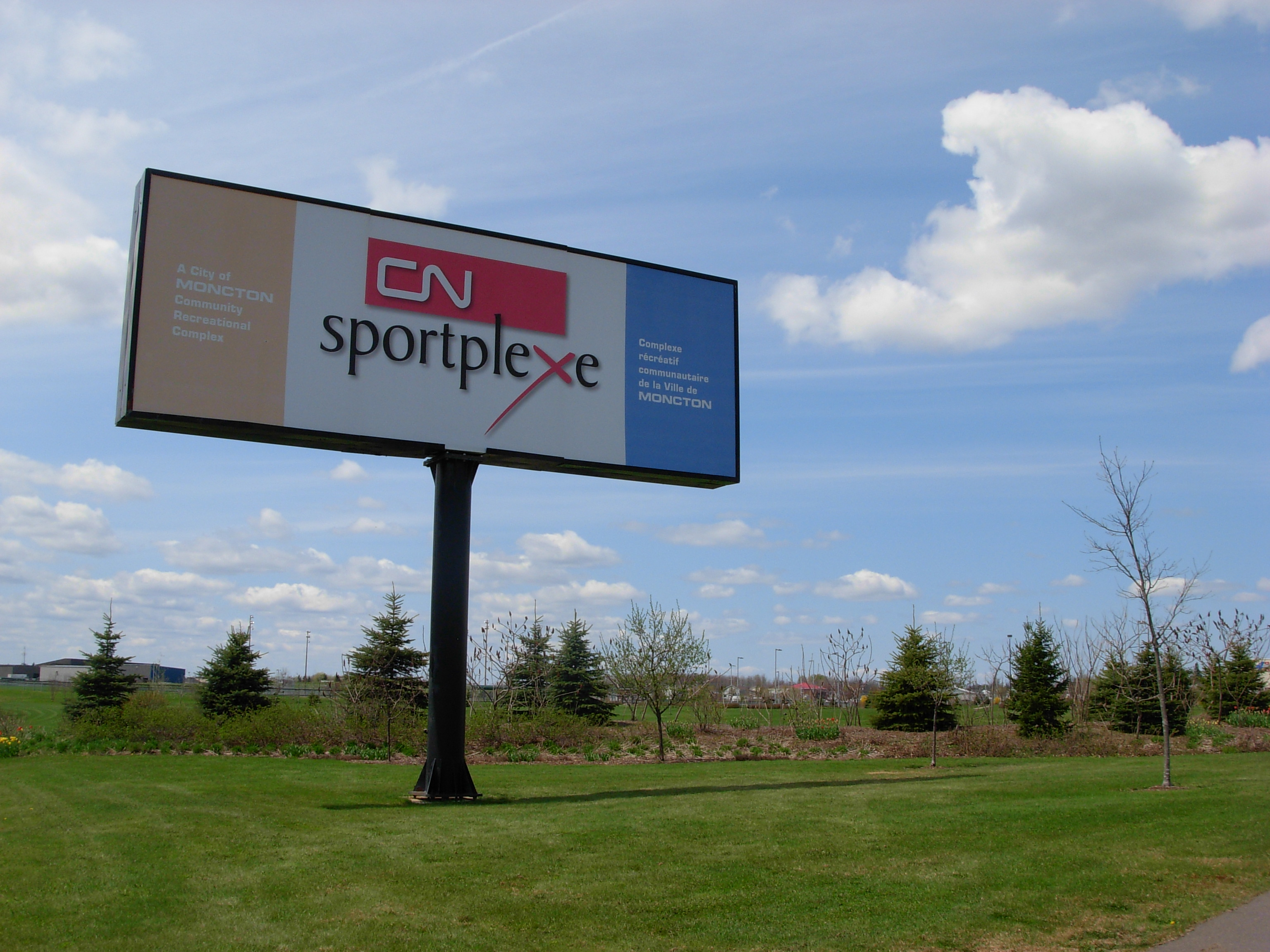
The entrance of the CN Sportplex

The CN Sportplex is a large recreational facility located in Moncton, New Brunswick, Canada. It consists of ten baseball fields, six soccer fields, and four indoor ice rinks, including the Superior Propane Centre. Also on site is the Moncton Sports Dome, a large air supported structure which offers paintball, golf, soccer and football.

== History ==
The facility is located on 282 acres (1.14 km^{2}) of land which were home to a large Canadian National Railway repair facility until its closure in 1988. The lot remained a vacant brownfield site until 1997, when its owner, Canada Lands Company, decided to develop the property into a recreation centre.

== Awards ==
- In 2002, the redevelopment received two Brownie Awards from the Canadian Urban Institute, for Sustainability in Community Building and Best Overall Project
- In 2003, the Phoenix Award – International Category was presented to the Canada Lands Company by the United States Environmental Protection Agency and the Phoenix Award Foundation
- The City of Moncton received the Scotts Turf Builder Award, presented by the Communities in Bloom Canada competition to the best sports field turf in Canada.

== See also ==
- Moncton Sport Facilities
