= Vincent Massey High School =

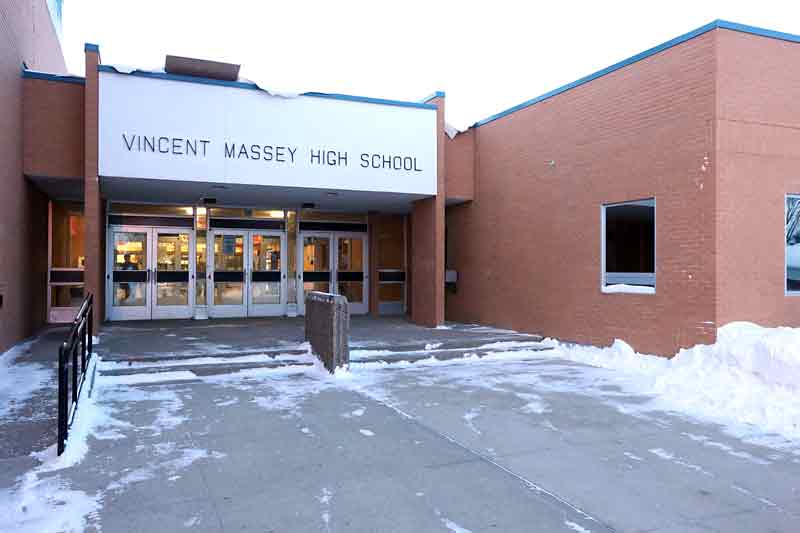
- The front entrance of Vincent Massey High School

Location
- 715 McDiarmid Dr; Brandon, Manitoba, R7B 2H8; Canada; 49.83867°N 99.97797°W

Information
- Founded: 1960
- School board: Brandon School Division#40
- Grades: 9-12
- Enrollment: 1100+
- Language: English
- Area: Western Brandon
- Colours: Purple and White
- Mascot: Viking
- Team name: Vikings

Vincent Massey High School is a high school in Brandon, Manitoba, Canada, and part of the Brandon School Division. The school opened in 1960 and it currently has more than 1100 students. The school is named for former Governor General of Canada Vincent Massey.

== Notable alumni ==
- Chris Bauman, football player
- Israel Idonije, professional football player
- James McCrae (politician), politician
- Zach Whitecloud, professional ice hockey player.
