= Brandon, Manitoba =

City in Manitoba, Canada

Brandon
- City
- City of Brandon
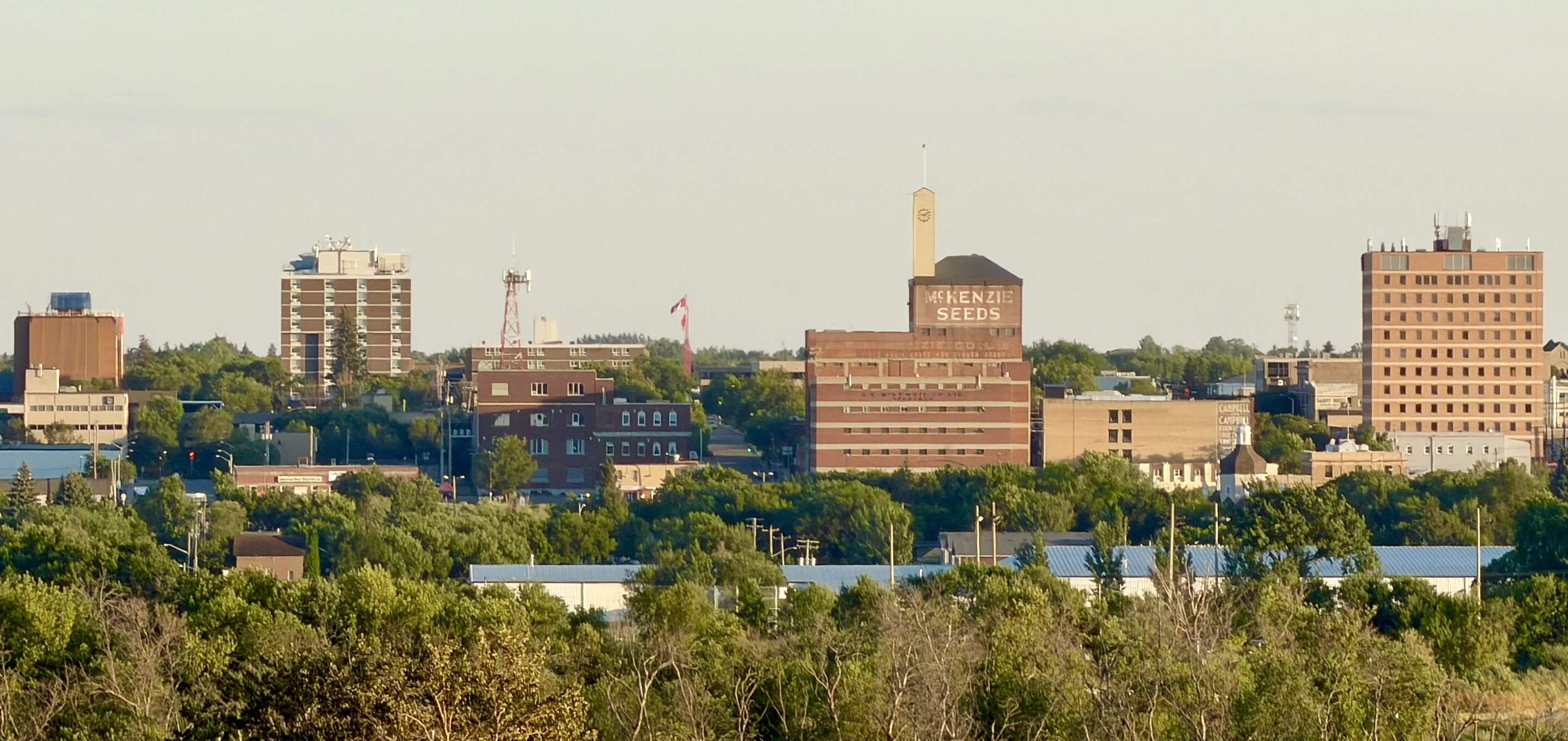
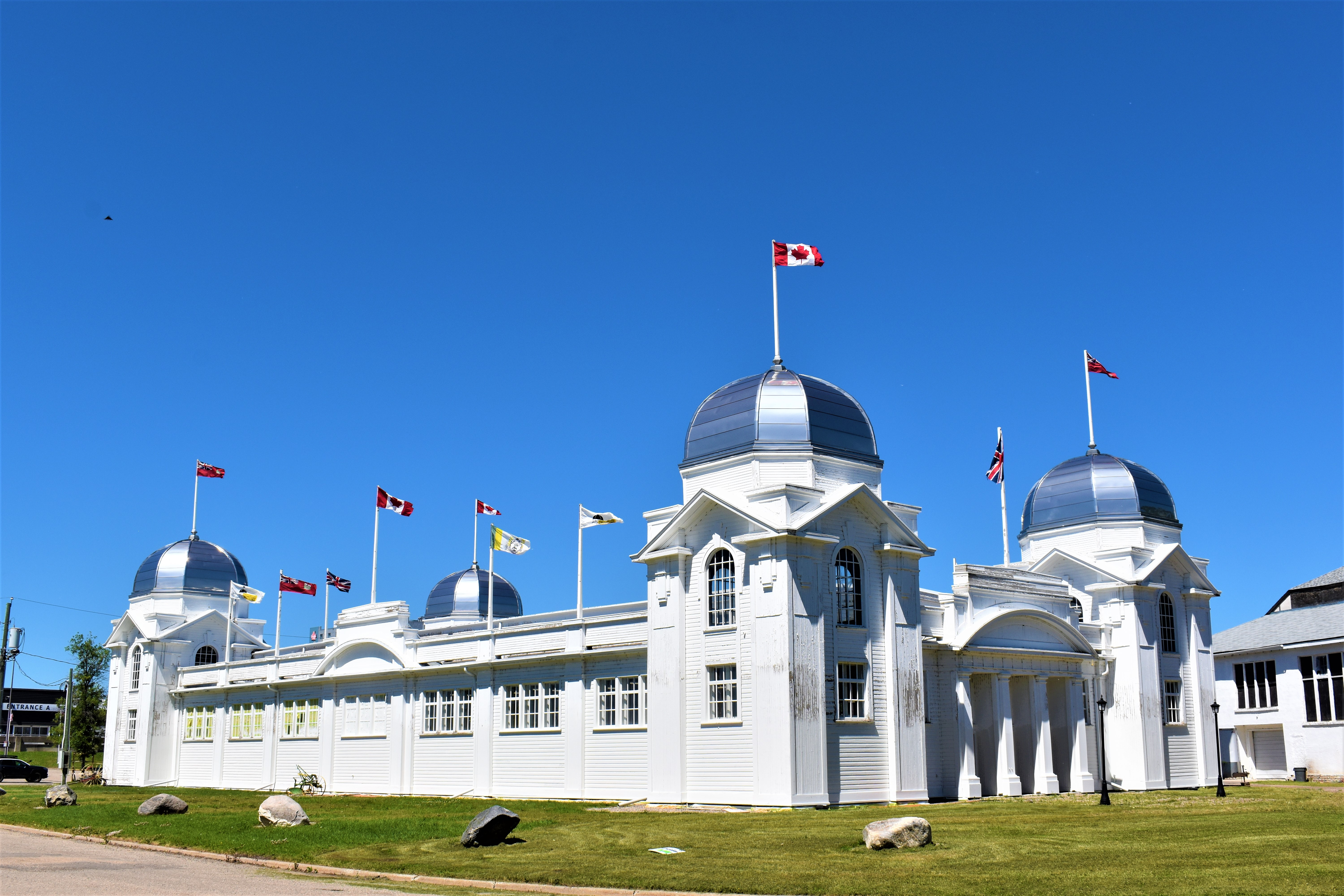
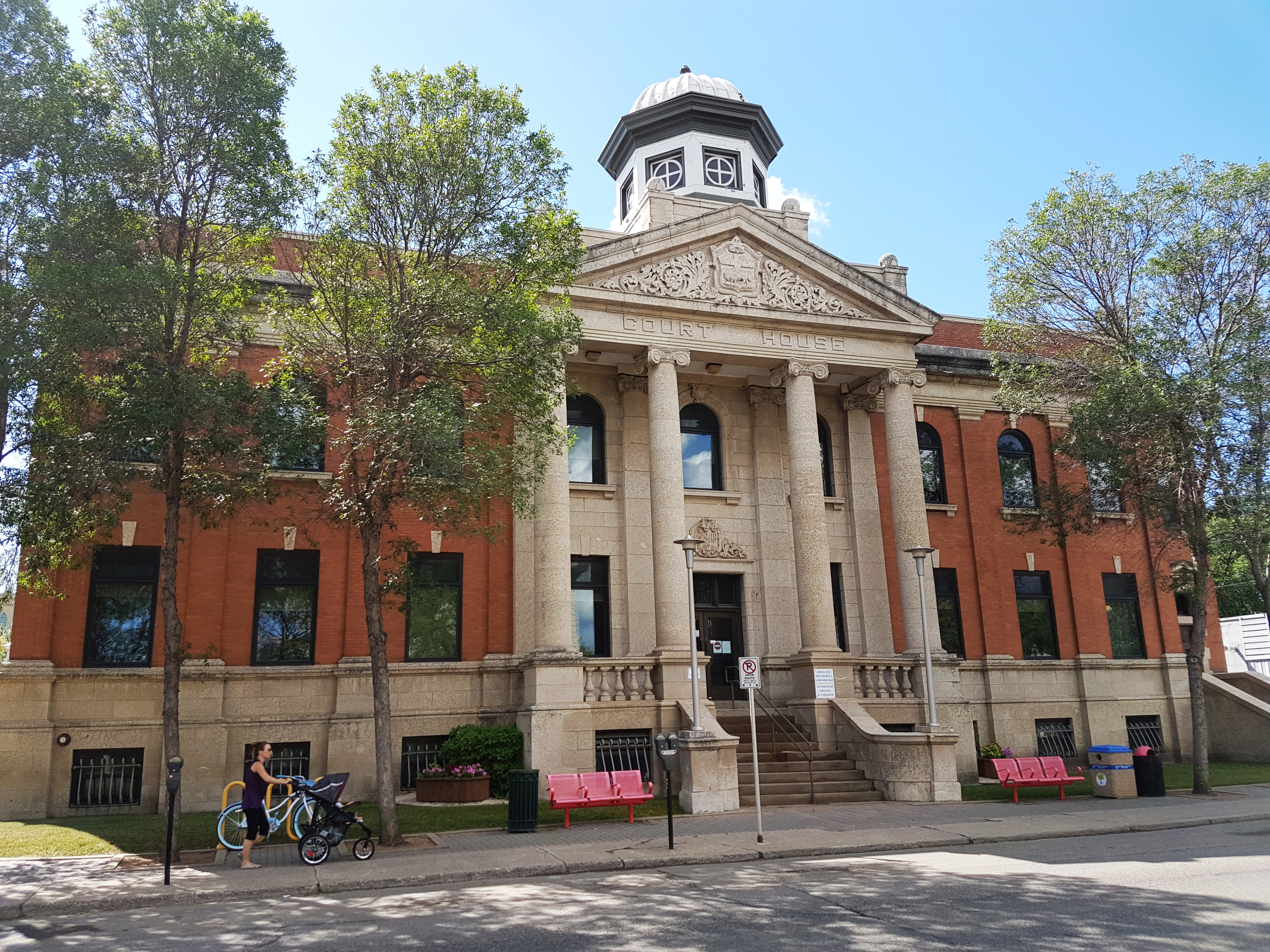
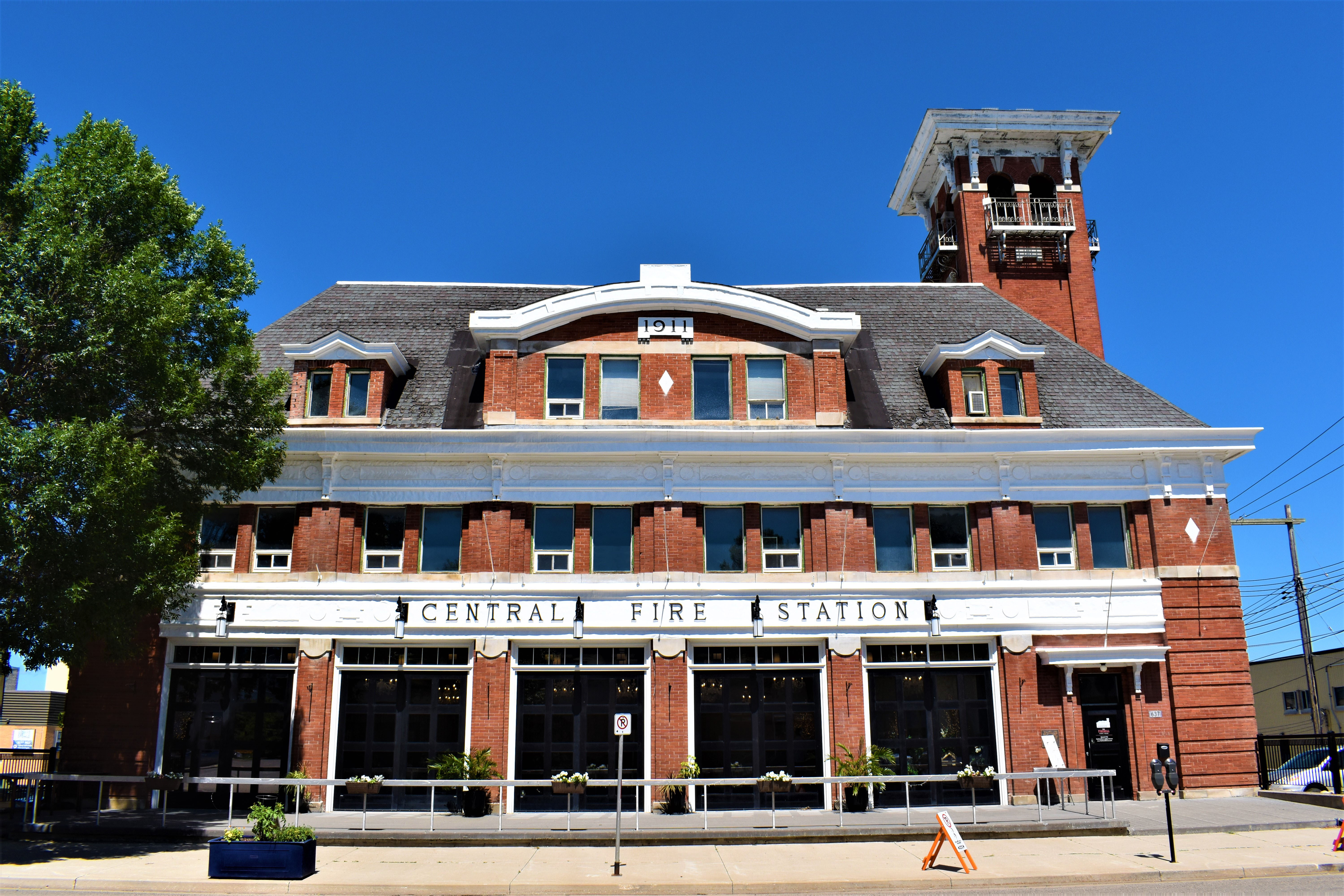
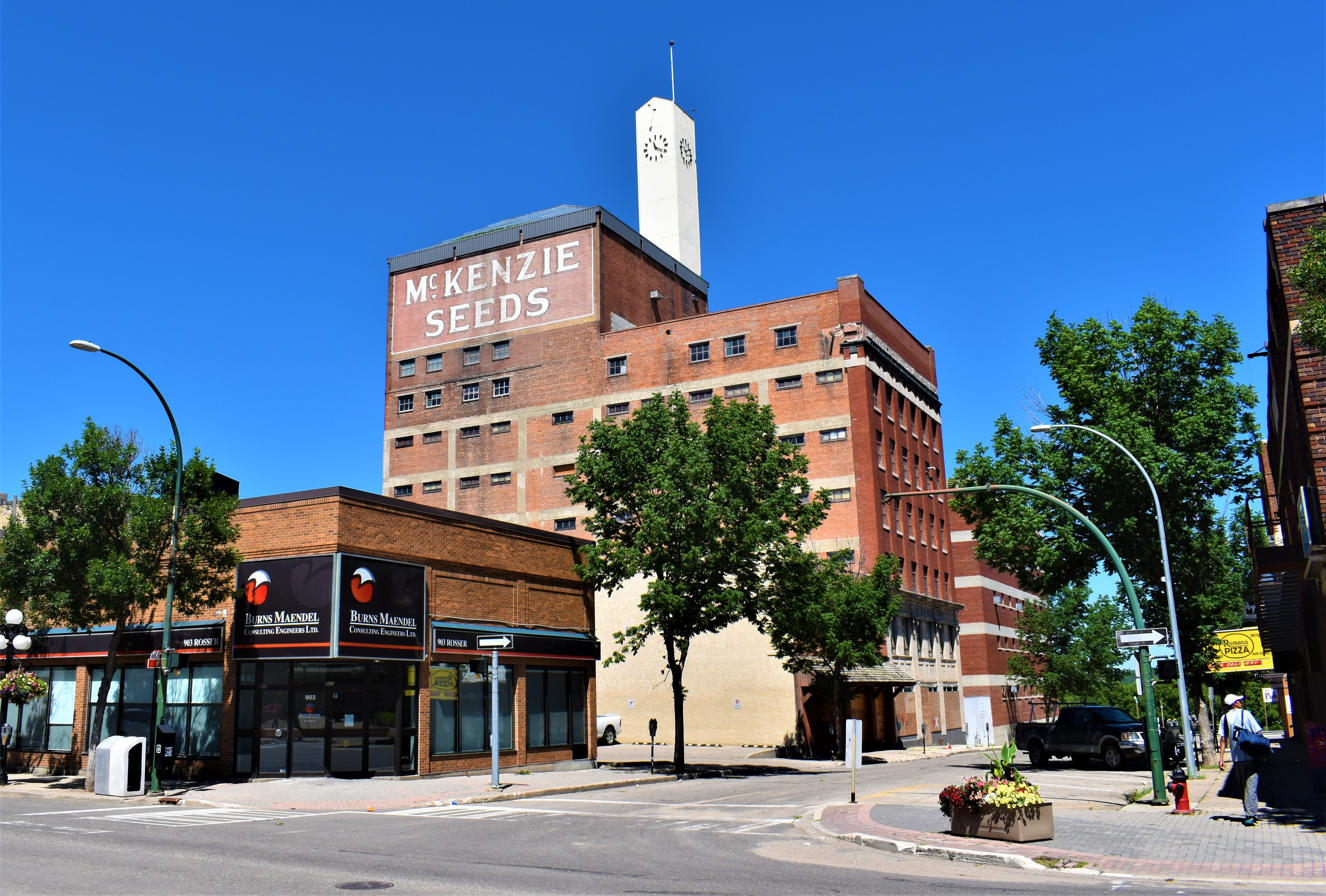
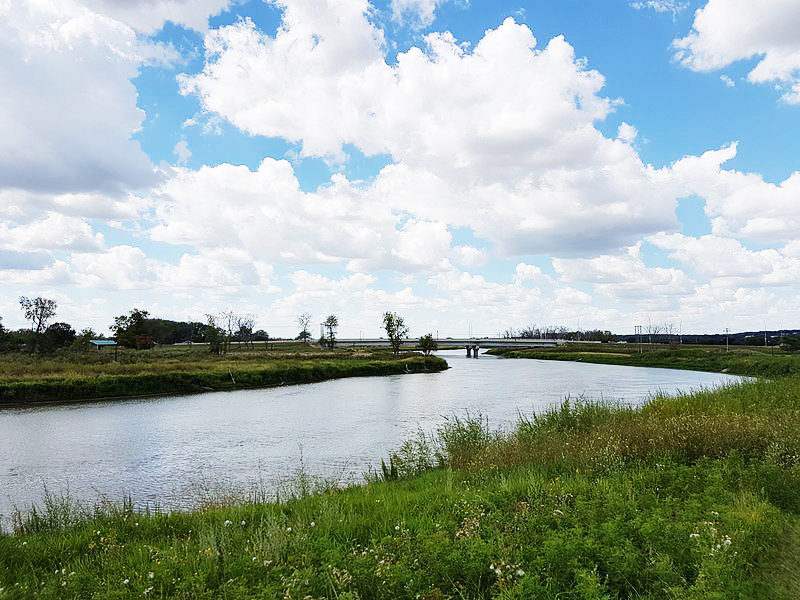
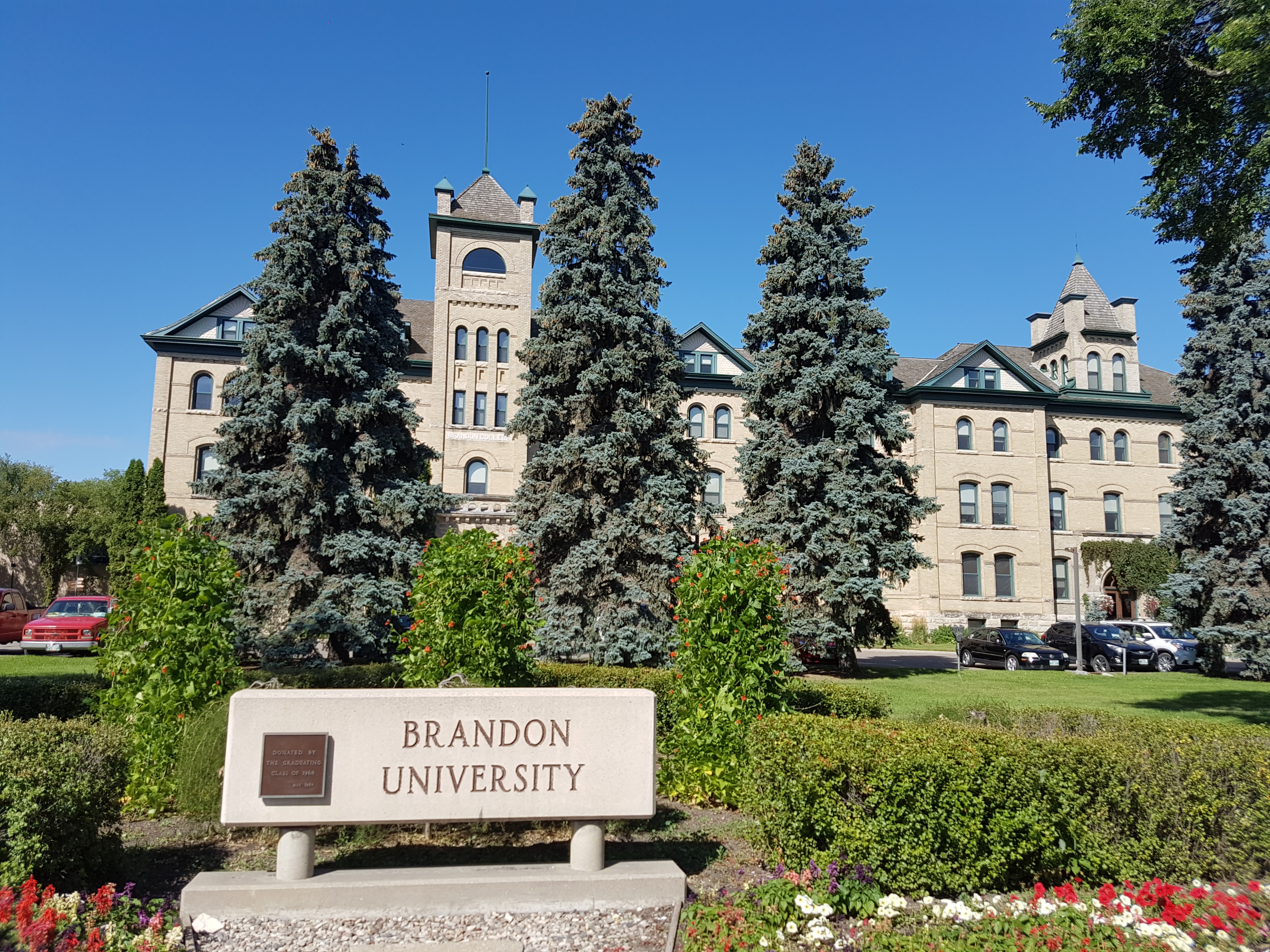
- Skyline of Brandon Dominion Exhibition Display Building II Brandon Court House Brandon Central Fire Station building Downtown Brandon Assiniboine River Brandon University

- Flag Coat of arms Logo
- Nicknames: "Wheat City"
- Motto: "Vires Acquirit Eundo" (Latin) "She acquires strength through progress"
- Location of Brandon Brandon (Manitoba)
- Coordinates: 49°50′49″N 099°57′08″W
- Country: Canada
- Province: Manitoba
- Region: Westman
- Incorporated: 30 May 1882

Government
  - Mayor: Jeff Fawcett
  - Governing Body: Brandon City Council
  - MLAs: Glen Simard (NDP); Wayne Balcaen (PC); Colleen Robbins (PC)
  - MP: Grant Jackson (CPC)

Area
  - City: 79.04 km^{2} (30.52 sq mi)
  - Urban: 76.89 km^{2} (29.69 sq mi)
  - Metro: 2,289.33 km^{2} (883.92 sq mi)
- Elevation: 409.40 m (1,343.2 ft)

Population (2021)
  - City: 51,313
  - Rank: 2nd in Manitoba
  - Density: 649.2/km^{2} (1,681/sq mi)
  - Metro: 54,268 (58th)
  - Metro density: 25.3/km^{2} (66/sq mi)
- Time zone: UTC– 05:00 (Central Daylight Time)
- Forward sortation area: R7A – R7C
- Area codes: 204, 431
- Demonym: Brandonite, Brandonian
- Website: brandon.ca

Brandon (/ˈbrændən/) is the second-largest city in the province of Manitoba, Canada. It is located on the banks of the Assiniboine River in Western Manitoba, approximately 214 kilometres (133 mi) west of the provincial capital, Winnipeg, and 120 kilometres (75 mi) east of the Saskatchewan provincial border. The city covers an area of 77.41 km^{2} (29.89 sq mi) with a population of 51,313, and a census metropolitan area population of 54,268. Brandon is the primary commercial centre for the Westman Region and parts of southeastern Saskatchewan, a trading area with a population of more than 190,000 people.

The City of Brandon was incorporated in 1882, having a history rooted in the Assiniboine River fur trade as well as its role as a major junction on the Canadian Pacific Railway. Known as The Wheat City, Brandon's economy is predominantly associated with agriculture, alongside major sectors in education, food processing, manufacturing, health care, business services, and transportation.

Brandon's post-secondary institutions include Brandon University, Assiniboine College, and the Manitoba Emergency Services College. Canadian Forces Base Shilo is located 30 km (19 mi) east of Brandon and maintains close ties with the city. Brandon's Keystone Centre is one of the largest consolidated entertainment, recreation, convention, and agriculture complexes in Canada, and is the home of the Brandon Wheat Kings and the Royal Manitoba Winter Fair.

== History ==
Prior to the influx of people from Eastern Canada, the area around Brandon was primarily used by the Sioux people, the Bungays, the Yellow Quills, and the Bird Tails. In the 1870s and early 1880s, the Plains Bison were nearly wiped out by over-hunting. With the destruction of their staff of life, the buffalo, the nomadic Sioux people began to agree to settle in reservations such as the Sioux Valley Dakota Nation, or left the area entirely.

French Canadians also passed through the area on river boats on their way to the Hudson Bay Post, Fort Ellice located near present-day St. Lazare, Manitoba. The city of Brandon gets its name from the Blue Hills south of the city, which got their name from a Hudson's Bay trading post known as Brandon House, which got its name from a hill on an island in James Bay where Captain James had anchored his ship in 1631.

During the 1870s it was believed by most that the transcontinental railway would take a northwesterly direction from Portage la Prairie. Many thought that the route would most likely go through either Minnedosa or Rapid City, Manitoba because they were both located at natural river crossings. Rapid City was the front runner for the site of the new railway and had prepared for the impending building boom accordingly. But suddenly, in 1881, the builders of the railway decided to take a more westerly route from Winnipeg, towards Grand Valley. Grand Valley was located on the northern side of the Assiniboine, opposite the side of the river where present-day Brandon sits.

Grand Valley was originally settled by two brothers John and Dougal McVicar, and their families. With the expectation of the new railway, settlers and prospectors now rushed to an area they had previously avoided. Around 1879 a few settlers led by Reverend George Roddick had begun to build their new homes about 10 miles (16 km) south of Grand Valley, at the foot of the Brandon Hills.

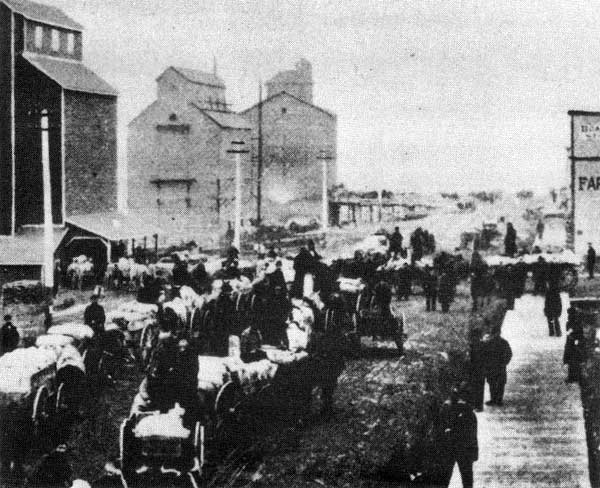
Wagons loaded with bags of grain awaiting delivery to elevators in Brandon, c. 1888

Meanwhile, in Grand Valley with the promise of the railway, the town began to boom. Regular voyages were made by steam sternwheelers to the city, each bringing more and more settlers. In the spring of 1881, General Thomas L. Rosser, Chief Engineer of the Canadian Pacific Railway arrived in Grand Valley. It was Rosser's job to choose the townsites for the railway. Rosser approached Dougald McVicar of Grand Valley and offered him $25,000 (equivalent to $790,000 in 2025) for the railway in Grand Valley. McVicar countered with $50,000 to which Rosser replied that "I'll be damned if a town of any kind is ever built here". So instead Rosser crossed the Assiniboine river and built the site of the railway on the high sandy south of the River, 2 miles (3.2 km) west of Grand Valley. So the site was then moved to a site just west of today's current First Street bridge in Brandon. A shanty had been built there by a man named J.D. Adamson, and it was on this quarter section Adamson claimed that Rosser chose as the townsite for the CPR Railway and named Brandon.

After the location of the railway was once again changed, there was still hope that Grand Valley could become a rival neighbour to Brandon. But late in June 1881 it became clear that Grand Valley would not have lasted as a city long term. A flood hit in late June, and as the city was built on a low-lying part of the river, flooded quickly and dramatically. Because Grand Valley was built on a low flood plain, and Brandon was built on the heights on the other side, it became apparent that Brandon was the best place for a city in the area.

Rosser had chosen Brandon as the townsite in May 1881, within a year settlers had flocked to Brandon in such numbers that it was incorporated as a city. Brandon never spent any time as a town or village but has only existed as a city.

An internment camp was set up at the Exhibition Building in Brandon from September 1914 to July 1916. Post World War II, Brandon experienced a minor disaster when an explosion at the Manitoba Power Commission's steam plant caused the 40 metre (130 ft) brick chimney to collapse, killing two workers in the process.

== Geography ==
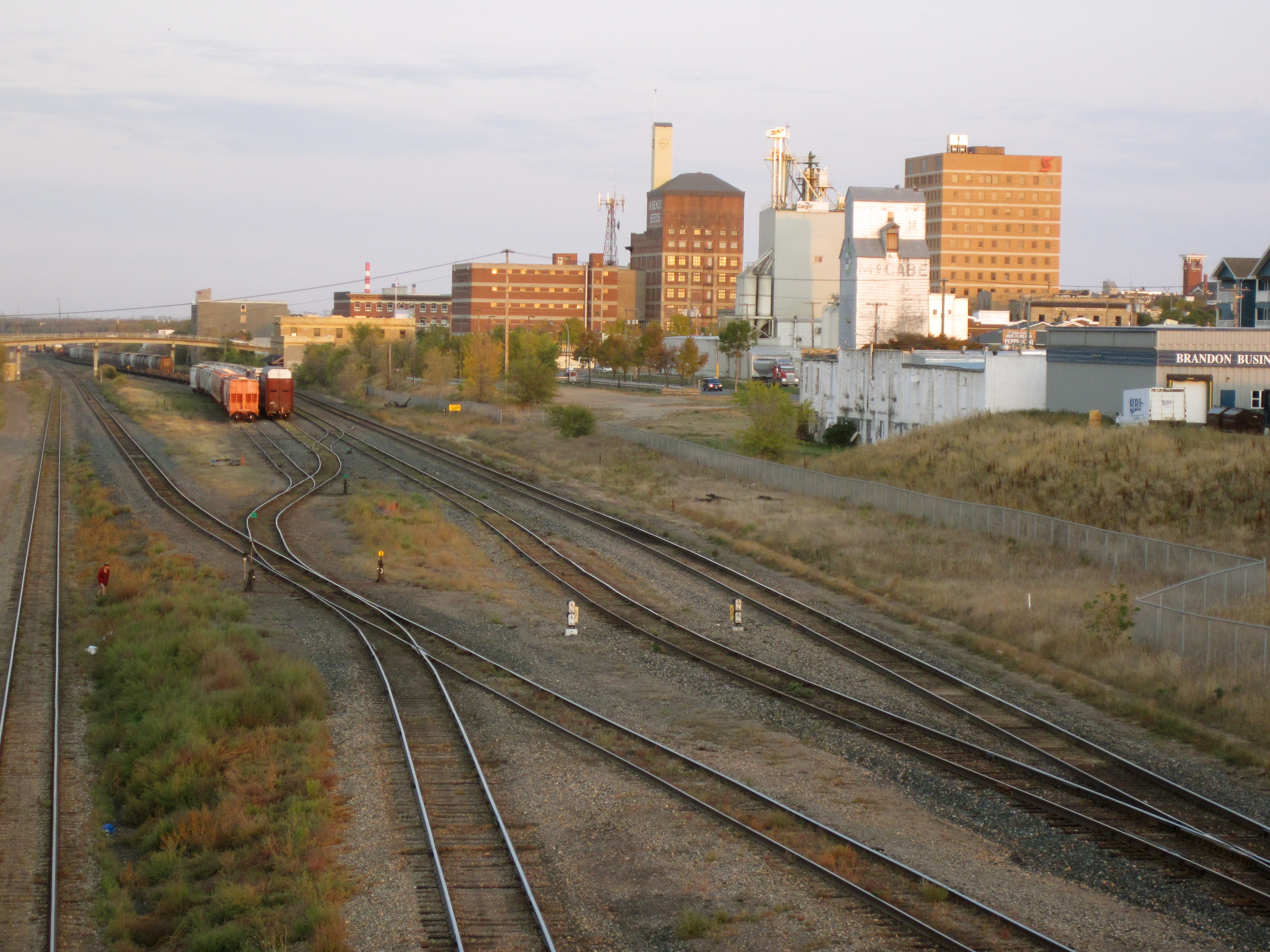
View of Downtown Brandon and the Canadian Pacific Railway yards from the Daly overpass

Brandon is located in south-western Manitoba, on the banks of the Assiniboine river. It is located in the Canadian Prairies and resides in the aspen parkland ecoregion of the prairies. The terrain is generally flat and rolling surrounding Brandon, and there is a large valley located within the city. The Brandon hills are located to the southeast, from which Brandon got its name. Brandon is 214 km (133 mi) west of the provincial capital, Winnipeg; and 120 km (75 mi) east of the Saskatchewan border.

=== Climate ===
Brandon has a dry continental climate (Köppen Dfb, USDA Plant Hardiness Zone 2b) with warm, sometimes hot summers and cold, dry winters. Mean maximum daytime temperatures range from 24.9 °C (76.8 °F) in July to −11.4 °C (11.5 °F) in January. Brandon has a fairly dry climate, with 489.4 mm (19.27 in) of precipitation annually, and as such is located in the Palliser's Triangle region of the Prairies. There is measurable rainfall on 72.2 days throughout the year, and 54.1 days with snowfall. Snow falls from October to April; however, snow has fallen as late as May and as early as September. The highest temperature ever recorded in Brandon was 43.3 °C (110 °F) on 11 July 1936, during the 1936 North American heat wave. The lowest temperature ever recorded was −46.7 °C (−52 °F) on 1 February 1893.

General seasons

- Winter: November to March
- Spring: April to May
- Summer: June to August
- Fall: September to October

Climate data for Brandon, 1991–2020 normals, extremes 1890–present
Month	Jan	Feb	Mar	Apr	May	Jun	Jul	Aug	Sep	Oct	Nov	Dec	Year
Record high °C (°F)	8.3 (46.9)	15.0 (59.0)	25.6 (78.1)	36.0 (96.8)	38.5 (101.3)	42.2 (108.0)	43.3 (109.9)	41.1 (106.0)	37.8 (100.0)	32.5 (90.5)	22.2 (72.0)	14.4 (57.9)	43.3 (109.9)
Mean maximum °C (°F)	2.2 (36.0)	1.4 (34.5)	9.6 (49.3)	22.4 (72.3)	29.1 (84.4)	30.8 (87.4)	31.3 (88.3)	33.2 (91.8)	29.8 (85.6)	23.2 (73.8)	10.9 (51.6)	2.8 (37.0)	34.4 (93.9)
Mean daily maximum °C (°F)	−11.4 (11.5)	−8.5 (16.7)	−1.6 (29.1)	9.6 (49.3)	17.4 (63.3)	22.6 (72.7)	24.9 (76.8)	25.1 (77.2)	19.5 (67.1)	10.1 (50.2)	−0.3 (31.5)	−8.6 (16.5)	8.2 (46.8)
Daily mean °C (°F)	−16.7 (1.9)	−14.1 (6.6)	−7.0 (19.4)	3.1 (37.6)	10.3 (50.5)	16.2 (61.2)	18.4 (65.1)	17.7 (63.9)	12.2 (54.0)	4.0 (39.2)	−5.3 (22.5)	−13.6 (7.5)	2.1 (35.8)
Mean daily minimum °C (°F)	−21.9 (−7.4)	−19.7 (−3.5)	−12.5 (9.5)	−3.3 (26.1)	3.2 (37.8)	9.7 (49.5)	11.8 (53.2)	10.2 (50.4)	4.9 (40.8)	−2.2 (28.0)	−10.3 (13.5)	−18.5 (−1.3)	−4.0 (24.8)
Mean minimum °C (°F)	−35.5 (−31.9)	−33.5 (−28.3)	−27.1 (−16.8)	−12.5 (9.5)	−5.1 (22.8)	2.7 (36.9)	5.6 (42.1)	3.9 (39.0)	−3.3 (26.1)	−11.8 (10.8)	−22.3 (−8.1)	−32.0 (−25.6)	−37.1 (−34.8)
Record low °C (°F)	−46.1 (−51.0)	−46.7 (−52.1)	−43.9 (−47.0)	−27.8 (−18.0)	−13.9 (7.0)	−3.9 (25.0)	0.0 (32.0)	−3.3 (26.1)	−11.7 (10.9)	−26.5 (−15.7)	−40.6 (−41.1)	−43.0 (−45.4)	−46.7 (−52.1)
Average precipitation mm (inches)	18.3 (0.72)	13.9 (0.55)	23.9 (0.94)	26.6 (1.05)	64.5 (2.54)	97.7 (3.85)	71.8 (2.83)	56.2 (2.21)	43.0 (1.69)	32.1 (1.26)	20.0 (0.79)	21.5 (0.85)	489.4 (19.27)
Average rainfall mm (inches)	0.3 (0.01)	1.5 (0.06)	7.0 (0.28)	18.7 (0.74)	60.8 (2.39)	97.7 (3.85)	71.8 (2.83)	56.2 (2.21)	36.7 (1.44)	25.8 (1.02)	3.7 (0.15)	0.4 (0.02)	380.4 (14.98)
Average snowfall cm (inches)	24.7 (9.7)	16.6 (6.5)	19.2 (7.6)	8.4 (3.3)	4.1 (1.6)	0.0 (0.0)	0.0 (0.0)	0.0 (0.0)	0.1 (0.0)	6.0 (2.4)	20.5 (8.1)	28.7 (11.3)	128.2 (50.5)
Average precipitation days (≥ 0.2 mm)	11.5	8.8	8.6	7.7	11.5	14.0	11.0	9.9	8.5	8.0	8.2	10.6	118.3
Average rainy days (≥ 0.2 mm)	0.61	0.75	2.3	5.4	10.8	14.0	11.0	9.9	8.3	6.5	2.0	0.71	72.2
Average snowy days (≥ 0.2 cm)	12.0	9.2	7.6	3.5	1.1	0.0	0.0	0.0	0.04	2.0	7.5	11.1	54.1
Average dew point °C (°F)	−19.3 (−2.7)	−17.1 (1.2)	−9.6 (14.7)	−3.1 (26.4)	2.8 (37.0)	10.3 (50.5)	13.7 (56.7)	12.0 (53.6)	6.6 (43.9)	−0.6 (30.9)	−8.3 (17.1)	−15.8 (3.6)	−2.4 (27.7)
Mean monthly sunshine hours	99.3	131.3	180.2	234.6	272.7	271.9	306.6	300.0	210.6	163.5	96.3	91.6	2,358.5
Percentage possible sunshine	37.2	46.2	49.0	56.9	57.2	55.7	62.3	66.9	55.5	48.9	35.3	36.1	50.6
Source 1: Environment Canada (bright sunshine recorded at airport, 1981-2010)
Source 2: weatherstats.ca (for dewpoint and monthly&yearly average absolute maximum&minimum temperature)

== Demographics ==
Historical population
Year	Pop.	±%
1891	3,778	—
1901	5,620	+48.8%
1911	13,839	+146.2%
1921	15,397	+11.3%
1931	17,082	+10.9%
1941	17,172	+0.5%
1951	20,598	+20.0%
1961	28,166	+36.7%
1971	31,150	+10.6%
1981	36,242	+16.3%
1991	38,567	+6.4%
1996	39,175	+1.6%
2001	39,716	+1.4%
2006	41,511	+4.5%
2011	46,061	+11.0%
2016	48,859	+6.1%
2021	51,313	+5.0%

Metro populations
Year	Pop.	±%
1991	39,897	—
1996	40,581	+1.7%
2001	46,273	+14.0%
2006	48,256	+4.3%
2011	54,847	+13.7%
2016	51,807	−5.5%
2021	54,268	+4.8%
The negative population trend in 2016 is a result of a change in the census assessment area. Sources:

Ethnic origins 2016
	Population	Percentage
English	13,585	28.6
Scottish	11,720	24.6
Canadian	10,650	22.4
Irish	8,210	17.3
Ukrainian	6,755	14.2
German	6,360	13.4
French	4,670	9.8
First Nations	4,025	8.5
Polish	3,110	6.5
Métis	2,795	5.9

In the 2021 Census of Population conducted by Statistics Canada, Brandon had a population of 51,313 living in 21,203 of its 22,526 total private dwellings, a change of 5% from its 2016 population of 48,883. With a land area of 79.04 km^{2} (30.52 sq mi), it had a population density of 649.2/km^{2} (1,681.4/sq mi) in 2021.

The median age is 36.3 years old which is almost 5 years younger than the national average at 41.2 years old. There are 22,526 dwellings in Brandon with an occupancy rate of 94.1%, and the median cost of a dwelling at $264,781, much lower than the national average at $341,556.

As far as education goes, for those between 25 and 64 years old, 57.0% have a post-secondary schooling degree, 29.8% have a high school degree (or equivalent) and 13.2% have no certificates, diplomas or degrees. The unemployment rate is 7.3% in Brandon, lower than the national average at 7.7%. The median household income before taxes is $65,960, and after taxes at $57,008.

As of 2016, 88.8% of Brandon's residents are Canadian citizens. About 5.5% of residents are recent immigrants (from 2011 to 2016).

=== Ethnicity ===
Brandon is 70.1% white, 16.3% visible minorities and 13.6% aboriginal. The largest visible minority groups in Brandon are Latin American (5.0%), Chinese (3.8%), South Asian (3.0%), Black (2.1%) and Filipino (1.1%).

Panethnic groups in the City of Brandon (2001–2021)
Panethnic group	2021		2016		2011		2006		2001	
Panethnic group	Pop.	%	Pop.	%	Pop.	%	Pop.	%	Pop.	%
European (Note: Statistic includes all persons that did not make up part of a visible minority or an indigenous identity.)	32,115	64.44%	33,295	70.01%	34,685	77.28%	35,105	86.24%	34,260	87.98%
Indigenous	7,075	14.2%	6,500	13.67%	5,040	11.23%	3,995	9.81%	3,725	9.57%
African	2,855	5.73%	1,000	2.1%	540	1.2%	270	0.66%	260	0.67%
South Asian	2,570	5.16%	1,430	3.01%	430	0.96%	360	0.88%	130	0.33%
Latin American	2,095	4.2%	2,370	4.98%	1,965	4.38%	425	1.04%	60	0.15%
East Asian (Note: Statistic includes total responses of "Chinese", "Korean", and "Japanese" under visible minority section on census.)	1,635	3.28%	1,965	4.13%	1,585	3.53%	270	0.66%	300	0.77%
Southeast Asian (Note: Statistic includes total responses of "Filipino" and "Southeast Asian" under visible minority section on census.)	980	1.97%	620	1.3%	430	0.96%	210	0.52%	150	0.39%
Middle Eastern (Note: Statistic includes total responses of "West Asian" and "Arab" under visible minority section on census.)	135	0.27%	150	0.32%	110	0.25%	20	0.05%	15	0.04%
Other/multiracial (Note: Statistic includes total responses of "Visible minority, n.i.e." and "Multiple visible minorities" under visible minority section on census.)	275	0.55%	245	0.52%	100	0.22%	50	0.12%	55	0.14%
Total responses	49,840	97.13%	47,560	97.29%	44,885	97.45%	40,705	98.06%	38,940	98.05%
Total population	51,313	100%	48,883	100%	46,061	100%	41,511	100%	39,716	100%
Note: Totals greater than 100% due to multiple origin responses

=== Language ===
The 2021 census found that English was the mother tongue of 80.6% of the population. The next most common mother tongues were Spanish (4.2%), Gujarati (2.8%), Mandarin (2.0%), French (1.4%), Tagalog (1.2%), Ukrainian (1.1%), Punjabi (0.9%), German (0.7%), Cantonese (0.7%), Amharic (0.7%), Yoruba (0.4%), Russian (0.4%), Tigrigna (0.4%), Arabic (0.3%), Cree (0.2%), Hindi (0.2%), Korean (0.2%), and Urdu (0.2%).

== Education ==
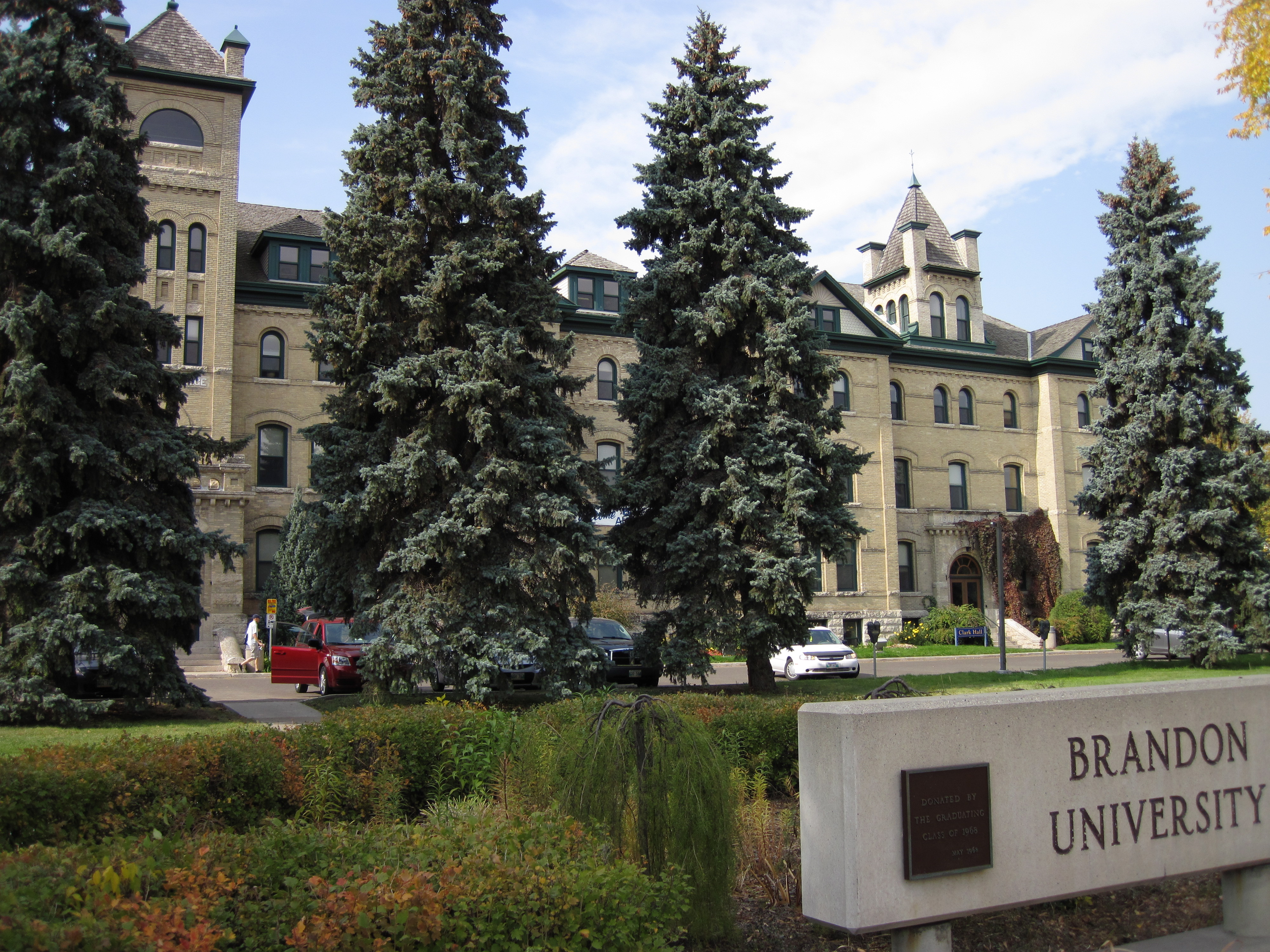
Brandon College building and Clark Hall building at Brandon University.

Public schools in Brandon are governed by the Brandon School Division. There are approximately 7,200 students, 900 staff, 22 schools and a budget exceeding $50 million. There are four high schools: Vincent Massey High School, Crocus Plains Regional Secondary School, and Neelin High School, and Prairie Hope High School (formerly BSD Off-Campus). Brandon is also home to three post-secondary institutions: Brandon University, Assiniboine College, as well as the Manitoba Emergency Services College.

== Sports ==
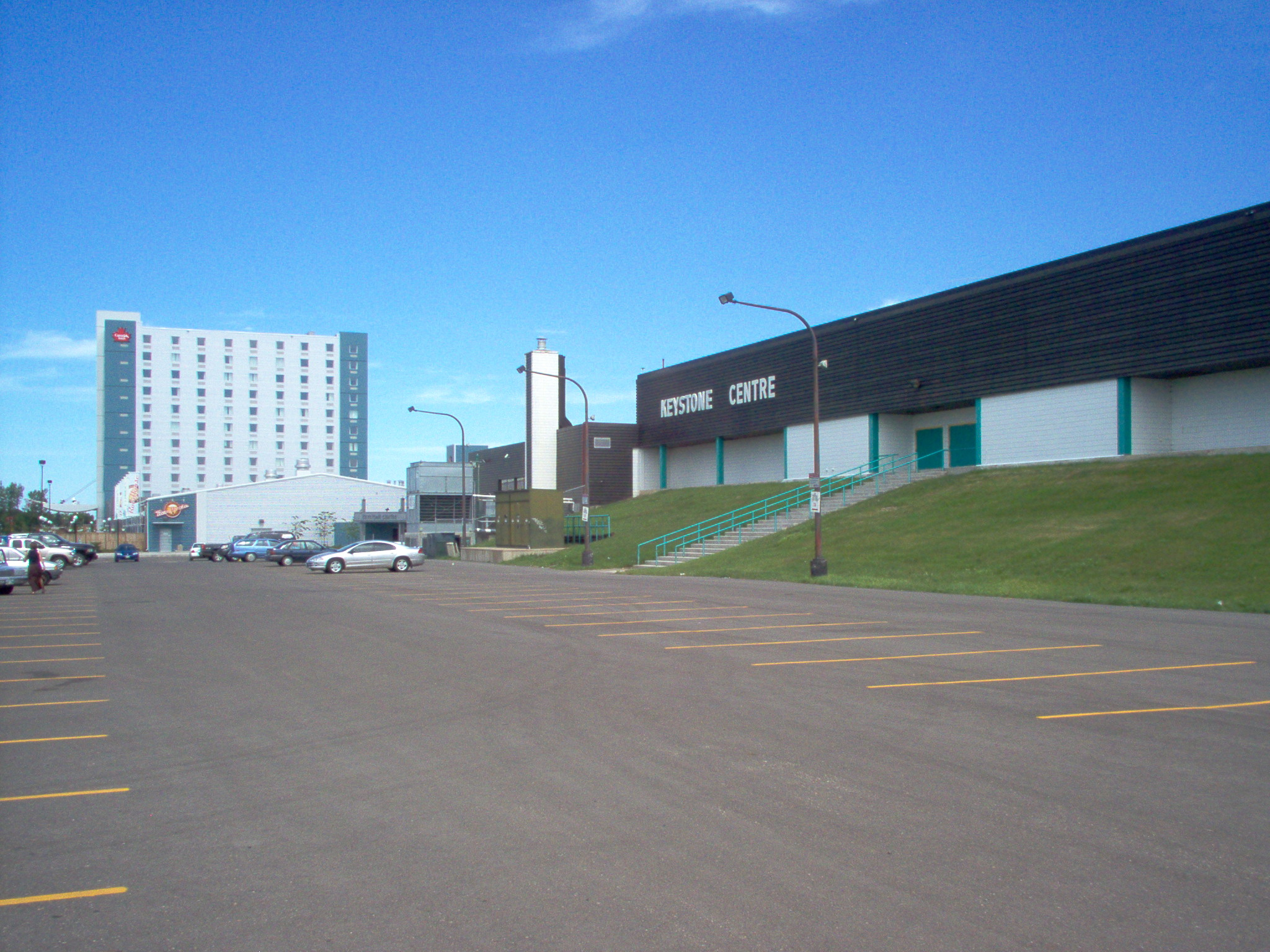
Keystone Centre

=== Local teams ===
- Brandon University Bobcats (Basketball/CWUAA)
- Brandon University Bobcats (Volleyball/CWUAA)
- Brandon Wheat Kings (Hockey/Western Hockey League)

=== Major sporting events ===
- The Brier – Canadian Men's Curling Championship (1963, 1982, 2019)
- U-18 Baseball World Cup – International U-18 Baseball Competition (1991, 1994)
- The Scott Tournament of Hearts – Canadian Women's Curling Championship (1993, 2002)
- World Curling Championship – Men's & Women's World Curling Championship (1995)
- Canadian Olympic Curling Trials – Men's & Women's Olympic Curling Trials (1997)
- Canada Winter Games – Canada Winter Games (1979)
- Canada Summer Games – Canada Summer Games (1997)
- Special Olympics Canada – Canada Special Olympics Summer Games (2006)
- Memorial Cup – MasterCard Memorial Cup (2010)
- U Sports Men's Volleyball Championship (2025)

=== Sports venues ===
- Keystone Centre
- Brandon Community Sportsplex
- Andrews Field
- Ashley Neufeld Softball Complex
- Canada Packers Sports Complex

== Infrastructure ==
Downtown Brandon is full of 20th century architecture with a skyline of brick buildings. The most notable are the old McKenzie Seeds building, Brandon Central Fire Station building and the Brandon Court House. The two tallest buildings in downtown Brandon are Scotia Tower,(tallest) and Park Towers

=== Transportation ===
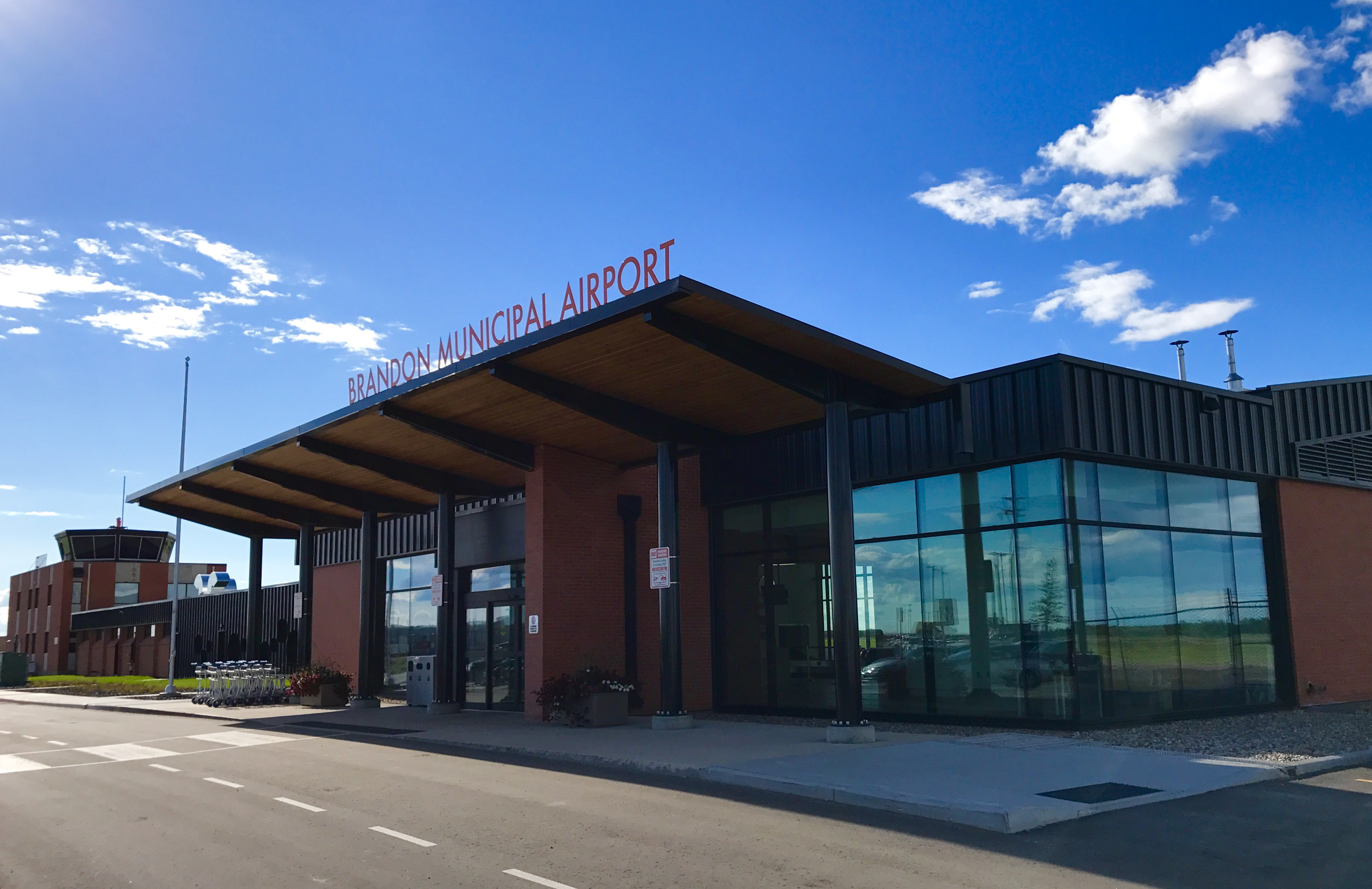
Brandon Municipal Airport passenger terminal building

- Brandon is serviced by Brandon Municipal Airport, with daily passenger flights to and from Calgary (YYC).
- Rider Express provide intercity bus service to and from Brandon from 70 Canadian locations. The Brandon Air Shuttle provide bus service to the Winnipeg Airport four times a day.
- Taxi service is available from numerous local taxi companies.
- The city of Brandon runs Brandon Transit, which provides daily bus service throughout the city, with 10 routes that operate seven days a week.
- Brandon has a system of walking/bike trails throughout the city.
- The Canadian Pacific Railway runs through Brandon; the station is a historic landmark.
- Cando Rail & Terminals is headquartered in Brandon.

=== Hospitals ===
The city is served by Brandon Regional Health Centre. The 300 bed hospital is the largest in the Westman Region.

=== Utilities ===
Water and sewage services are provided by the City of Brandon. The city draws water from the Assiniboine River where it is then treated and fluoridated at the community's water treatment plant on McDonald Avenue. The Assiniboine River's flow is regulated by the Shellmouth Dam in order to ensure that communities on the river have adequate water supply. Brandon has two emergency groundwater wells to supply water in the event of an emergency situation with water supply or if there are issues with water turbidity or elevated organic water hardness. Like nearly every community in Manitoba, electricity is 98% hydro generated and supplied by Manitoba Hydro. The Brandon Generating Station was a coal powered plant that operated until about 2018. It is now natural gas fueled and runs only as a synchronous condenser to regulate grid voltage in southwest Manitoba.

== Media ==
The Brandon Sun publishes daily newspapers.

== Arts & Culture ==
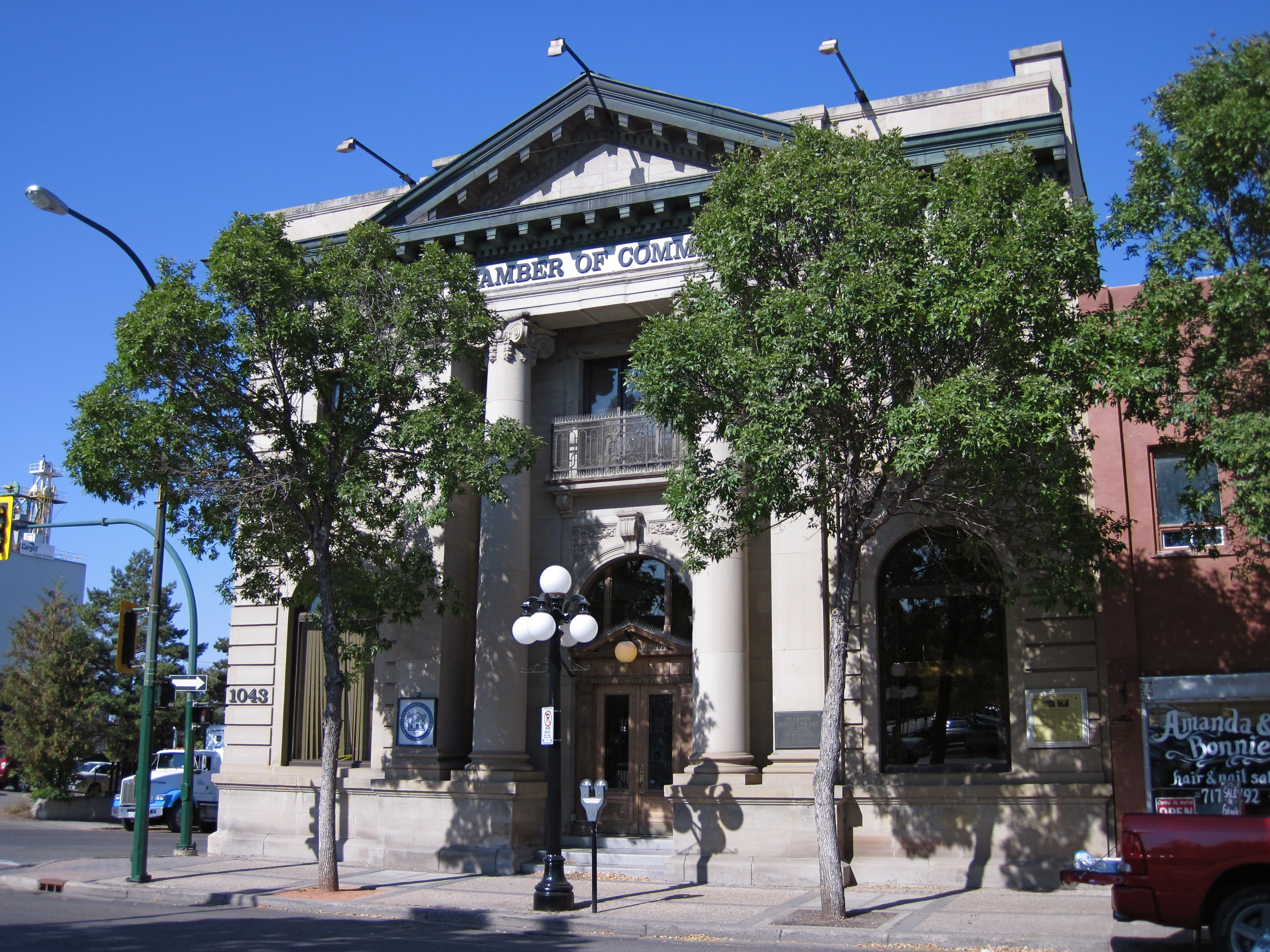
Merchants Bank Building on Rosser Avenue, built in 1907

Brandon hosts many art festivals every year, including the Brandon Festival of the Arts, Brandon University Jazz Festival, and the Salamander Summer Music Festival. In addition to the music festivals, the Brandon University School of Music hosts the annual 'Pro Series' which has included guests like Bob Brookmeyer, George Crumb, and the Winnipeg Symphony Orchestra. In 2009, Brandon hosted the Western Canadian Music Awards.

The "Words Alive" was a yearly literary festival held in downtown Brandon, from 2007–2010. Authors that participated in this festival included Robert J. Sawyer, Maggie Siggins, Fred Stenson and Corey Redekop.

Some of the local arts venues include the Western Manitoba Centennial Auditorium, Lorne Watson Recital Hall, Evans Theatre, and the Art Gallery of Southwestern Manitoba.

== Events and exhibitions ==
- The Provincial Exhibition of Manitoba is a non-profit organization established in 1872, which is now housed at the city's extensive Keystone Centre complex. It hosts
  - Royal Manitoba Winter Fair (March)
  - Manitoba Summer Fair (June)
  - Manitoba Livestock Expo (November)
- AgDays – Canada's largest indoor agricultural trade show and program, and one of the premier shows of its kind in North America. Held in mid January each year at Brandon's Keystone Centre.
- Brandon Folk Music and Arts Festival was a weekend event held annually in late July. The festival was held outdoors on the grounds of the Keystone Centre until 2019.
- The Commonwealth Air Training Plan Museum, located at the Brandon Municipal Airport.

== Notable people ==
- Roy Sydney Baker-Falkner – World War II naval aviator and Battle of Britain pilot
- William Otway Boger – World War I flying ace
- Rick Borotsik – politician/ Mayor
- Turk Broda – ice hockey player
- Samuel Bronfman – businessman
- Larry Brown – ice hockey player
- Michael Cain – pianist
- Matt Calvert – hockey player
- Drew Caldwell – politician / provincial cabinet minister
- Kristen Campbell – ice hockey player
- Walter Dinsdale – airman / politician / provincial cabinet minister / member of parliament
- Joseph Donaldson – politician
- Tommy Douglas – politician
- Liam Duncan – musician
- Douglas Durkin – writer
- Joel Edmundson – ice hockey player
- James Ehnes – violinist
- Leonard Evans – politician / provincial cabinet minister
- Bill Fairbairn – hockey player
- Gathie Falk – artist
- Russ Ford – baseball player
- Trent Frayne – sportswriter
- Glen Hanlon – ice hockey player
- Scott Gillingham – politician / Mayor
- Dan Halldorson – professional golfer
- Charles Hefferon – South African athlete
- Reg Helwer – politician / provincial cabinet minister
- Jerry Hemmings – basketball coach
- Ron Hextall – ice hockey player
- Douglas Hill – science fiction author
- William G. Hobbs – artist
- Edna Mayne Hull – writer
- Israel Idonije – NFL football player
- Stanley Knowles – politician
- Keegan Kolesar – ice hockey player
- Greg Leskiw – guitarist for The Guess Who
- Kavavaow Mannomee – artist
- Jordan Martinook – hockey player
- John Mayhew – cricket player
- Brad Maxwell – hockey player
- James McCrae (politician) – politician / provincial cabinet minister
- Kelly McCrimmon - Ice hockey player / ice hockey executive
- Leslie McDorman – politician
- James Duncan McGregor – agriculturalist
- Daren Millard – sportscaster
- Kelsey Mitchell – cyclist
- Mae Moore – musician
- Diane Ogibowski - figure skater
- Isabela Onyshko - gymnast
- Martha Ostenso – writer
- David Robertson - writer
- Art Ross – hockey player and executive
- Bryce Salvador - ice hockey player
- Karl Schroeder – science fiction author
- Damon Severson – ice hockey player
- Haroon Siddiqui – journalist
- Shotgun Jimmie – musician
- Amanda Stott – musician
- Andrew Unger – writer
- Zach Whitecloud – ice hockey player
- Donald Woods - actor
- J.S. Woodsworth – minister
- Ken Wregget – hockey player

== See also ==
- HMCS Brandon
- 26th Field Artillery Regiment, Royal Canadian Artillery
- St. Matthew's Anglican Cathedral, Brandon
