= Neelin High School =

École Neelin High School

Location
- 1020 Brandon Avenue; Brandon, Manitoba, R7A 1K6; Canada; 49.833°N 99.9505°W

Information
- Motto: Cum Manu et Capite (with Hand and Mind)
- Founded: 1957
- School board: Brandon School Division#40
- Principal: Baseswa Nundu
- Grades: 9-12
- Enrollment: 700
- Language: English and French
- Area: South Central Brandon
- Colours: Green and White
- Mascot: Paul Donkersloot
- Team name: Spartans
- Website: www.brandonsd.mb.ca/neelin/

Neelin High School is a high school in Brandon, Manitoba, Canada. Its French name is "L'École secondaire Neelin." The school is public and funded by the province.

== History ==
Neelin Composite High School opened in January 1957. The school was named after Thomas Addison Neelin, the Superintendent of the Brandon Schools from 1924 to 1950. Comp. High, as it came to be known, offered an academic program of studies along with Industrial Vocational, Business Education and Occupational Entrance Courses. The school motto Cum Manu et Capite (With Hand and Mind) reflects this early program mix. The school functioned as a composite high school until 1974, when the Industrial Vocational, Business Education, and Occupational Entrance courses were transferred over to Crocus Plains Regional Secondary School. Composite, was shortly thereafter removed from the title of the school, leaving T.A. Neelin High School. Through the ensuing years it has come to be known as Neelin High School, or more simply, Neelin.

== Programs ==
It offers programs in both French immersion and English. Neelin High School has offered an IB Diploma Programme since May 2006 in addition to a regular program in Life Skills-Based Education. Neelin High School has a choir program consisting of four choirs, all under the conduction of Ms. Marla Fontaine. Neelin's sports teams are known as the "Neelin Spartans".

== 2025 Stabbing ==
In June of 2025, a 16 year old male student donning a plague doctor mask and a machete entered the school with the intent to kill as many black or immigrant students and staff as possible. The culprit severely injured 1 student and at least 2 staff members in the attack, though no one was killed. The culprit was discovered to have idolized Nazi rhetoric and was successfully apprehended and arrested by police.
