= History of the Canadian Pacific Railway =

Following Canadian Confederation, the creation of the Canadian Pacific Railway was a task originally undertaken as the "National Dream" by the Conservative government of Prime Minister John A. Macdonald (1st Canadian Ministry). A key component of his National Policy, Macdonald was helped by Alexander Tilloch Galt, who was the owner of the North Western Coal and Navigation Company. British Columbia, a four-month sea voyage away from the East Coast, had insisted upon a land transport link to the East as a condition for joining Confederation, after initially requesting a wagon road.

== 1872–1881 ==
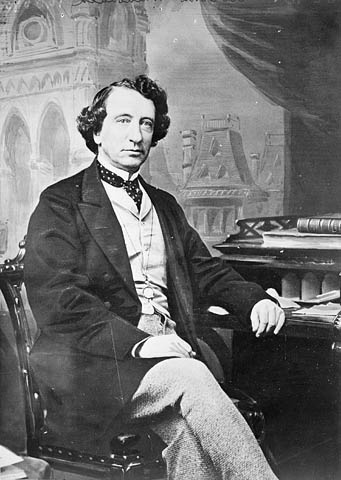
John A. Macdonald

In 1873, John A. Macdonald and other high-ranking politicians, bribed in the Pacific Scandal, granted federal contracts to Hugh Allan's Canada Pacific Railway Company (unrelated to the current company) rather than to David Lewis Macpherson's Inter-Ocean Railway Company which was thought to have connections to the American Northern Pacific Railway Company. Because of this scandal, the Conservative Party was removed from office in 1873. The new Liberal prime minister, Alexander Mackenzie, ordered construction of segments of the railway as a public enterprise under the supervision of the Department of Public Works led by Sandford Fleming. Surveying was carried out during the first years of a number of alternative routes in this virgin territory followed by the construction of a telegraph along the lines that had been agreed upon. The Thunder Bay section linking Lake Superior to Winnipeg was commenced in 1875. By 1880, around 1,000 kilometres (700 mi) was nearly complete, mainly across the troublesome Canadian Shield terrain, with trains running on only 500 kilometres (300 mi) of track.

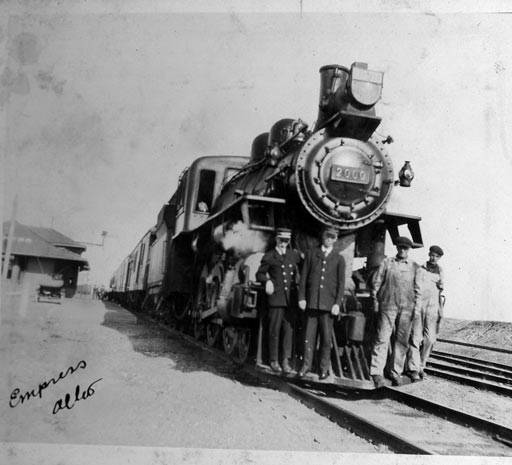
C.P.R. 2-6-0 locomotive no. 2000 and employees

With Macdonald's return to power on 16 October 1878, a more aggressive construction policy was adopted. Macdonald confirmed that Port Moody would be the terminus of the transcontinental railway, and announced that the company would follow the Fraser and Thompson rivers between Port Moody and Kamloops. In 1879, the federal government floated bonds in London and called for tenders to construct the 206 km (128 mi) section of the railway from Yale, British Columbia, to Savona's Ferry, on Kamloops Lake. The contract was awarded to Andrew Onderdonk, whose men started work on 15 May 1880. After the completion of that section, Onderdonk received contracts to build between Yale and Port Moody, and between Savona's Ferry and Eagle Pass.

On 21 October 1880, a new syndicate, unrelated to Hugh Allan's, signed a contract with the Macdonald government. Fleming was dismissed and replaced with Collingwood Schreiber as chief engineer and general manager of all government railways. They agreed to build the railway in exchange for $25 million (approximately $625 million in modern Canadian dollars) in credit from the Canadian government and a grant of 25 million acres (100,000 km^{2}) of land. The government transferred to the new company those sections of the railway it had constructed under government ownership, on which it had already spent at least $25 million. But its estimates of the cost of the Rocky Mountain section alone was over $60 million. The government also defrayed surveying costs and exempted the railway from property taxes for 20 years. The Montreal-based syndicate officially comprised five men: George Stephen, James J. Hill, Duncan McIntyre, Richard B. Angus and John Stewart Kennedy. Donald A. Smith and Norman Kittson were unofficial silent partners with a significant financial interest. On 15 February 1881, legislation confirming the contract received royal assent, and the Canadian Pacific Railway Company was formally incorporated the next day. Critics claimed that the government gave too large a subsidy for the proposed project but this was to incorporate uncertainties of risk and irreversibility of insurance. The large subsidy also needed to compensate the CPR for not constructing the line in the future, but rather right away even though demand would not cover operational costs.

A beaver was chosen as the railway's logo in honour of Donald Smith, 1st Baron Strathcona and Mount Royal, who had risen from factor to governor of the Hudson's Bay Company over a lengthy career in the beaver fur trade. Smith was a principal financier of the CPR. staking much of his personal wealth to the venture. In 1885, he drove the last spike to complete the transcontinental line.

== Building the railway, 1881–1886 ==
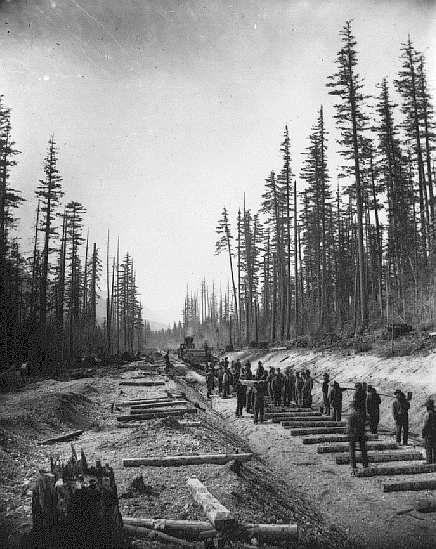
Canadian Pacific Railway Crew laying tracks at lower Fraser Valley, 1883

Building the railway took over four years. James J. Hill in 1881 sent Alpheus Beede Stickney to serve as construction superintendent for the Canadian Pacific Railway. The Canadian Pacific Railway began its westward expansion from Bonfield, Ontario (previously called Callander Station), where the first spike was driven into a sunken railway tie. Bonfield was inducted into Canadian Railway Hall of Fame in 2002 at the CPR first spike location. That was the point where the Canada Central Railway extension ended. The CCR was owned by Duncan McIntyre, who amalgamated it with the CPR, and became one of the handful of officers of the newly formed CPR. The CCR started in Brockville and extended to Pembroke. It then followed a westward route along the Ottawa River passing through places like Cobden, Deux-Rivières, and eventually to Mattawa at the confluence of the Mattawa and Ottawa rivers. It then proceeded cross-country towards its final destination of Bonfield. Duncan McIntyre and his contractor James Worthington piloted the CPR expansion. Worthington continued on as the construction superintendent for the CPR past Bonfield. He remained with the CPR for about a year after which he left the company. McIntyre was uncle to John Ferguson who staked out future North Bay and who became the town's wealthiest inhabitant and mayor for four successive terms.

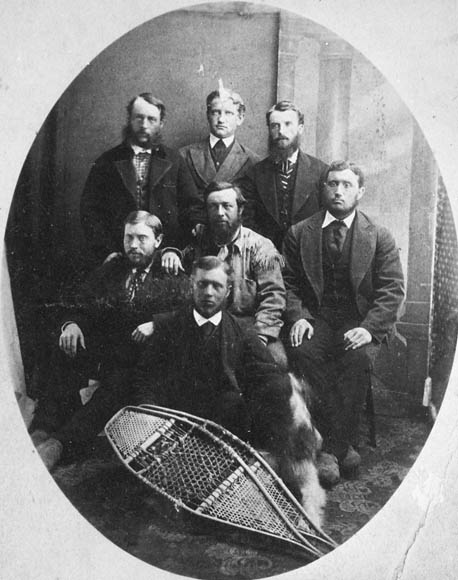
Unidentified engineers of the Canadian Pacific Railway Survey, 1872

It was presumed that the railway would travel through the rich "Fertile Belt" of the North Saskatchewan River Valley and cross the Rocky Mountains via the Yellowhead Pass, a route suggested by Fleming based on a decade of work. However, the CPR quickly discarded this plan in favour of a more southerly route across the arid Palliser's Triangle in Saskatchewan and via Kicking Horse Pass and down the Field Hill to the Rocky Mountain Trench. This route was more direct and closer to the Canada–US border, making it easier for the CPR to keep American railways from encroaching on the Canadian market. However, this route also had several disadvantages.

One was that the CPR would need to find a route through the Selkirk Mountains in British Columbia. At the time, it was not known whether a route even existed. The job of finding a pass was assigned to surveyor Major Albert Bowman Rogers. The CPR promised him a cheque for $5,000 and that the pass would be named in his honour. Rogers became obsessed with finding the pass that would immortalize his name. He discovered the pass in April 1881 and, true to its word, the CPR named it "Rogers Pass" and gave him the cheque. However, he at first refused to cash it, preferring to frame it, saying he did not do it for the money. He later agreed to cash it with the promise of an engraved watch.

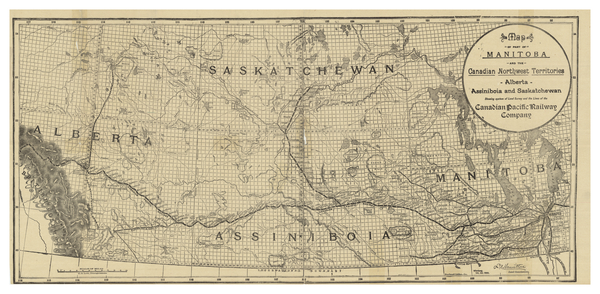
Map from 1890 showing system of land survey and the lines of the Canadian Pacific Railway in Manitoba, Alberta, Assiniboia, and Saskatchewan. First Nations reserves are marked throughout with "I.R." for "Indian Reserve".

Another obstacle was that the proposed route crossed land in Alberta that was controlled by the Blackfoot First Nation. This difficulty was overcome when a missionary priest, Albert Lacombe, persuaded the Blackfoot chief Crowfoot that construction of the railway was inevitable. In return for his assent, Crowfoot was famously rewarded with a lifetime pass to ride the CPR.

A more lasting consequence of the choice of route was that, unlike the one proposed by Fleming, the land surrounding the railway often proved too arid for successful agriculture. The CPR may have placed too much reliance on a report from naturalist John Macoun, who had crossed the prairies at a time of very high rainfall and had reported that the area was fertile.

The greatest disadvantage of the route was in Kicking Horse Pass, at the Alberta-British Columbia border on the continental divide. In the first 6 km (3.7 mi) west of the 1,625 metres (5,331 feet) high summit, the Kicking Horse River drops 350 metres (1,150 feet). The steep drop would force the cash-strapped CPR to build a 7 km (4.3 mi) long stretch of track with a very steep 4 1/2 percent gradient once it reached the pass in 1884. This was over four times the maximum gradient recommended for railways of this era, and even modern railways rarely exceed a two-percent gradient. However, this route was far more direct than one through the Yellowhead Pass and saved hours for both passengers and freight. This section of track was the CPR's Big Hill. Safety switches were installed at several points, the speed limit for descending trains was set at 10 km per hour (6 mph), and special locomotives were ordered. Despite these measures, several serious runaways still occurred including the first locomotive, which belonged to the contractors, to descend the line. CPR officials insisted that this was a temporary expediency, but this state of affairs would last for 25 years until the completion of the Spiral Tunnels in the early 20th century.

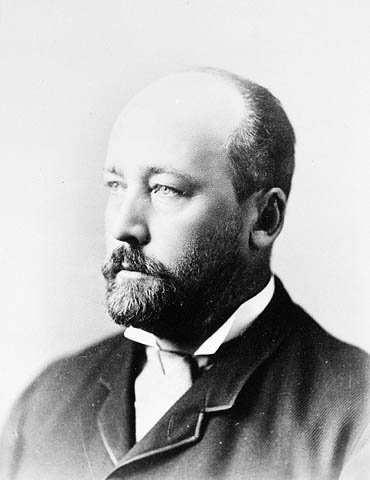
William Cornelius Van Horne

In 1881, construction progressed at a pace too slow for the railway's officials who, in 1882, hired the renowned railway executive William Cornelius Van Horne to oversee construction with the inducement of a generous salary and the intriguing challenge of handling such a difficult railway project. Van Horne stated that he would have 800 km (500 mi) of main line built in 1882. Floods delayed the start of the construction season, but over 672 km (418 mi) of main line, as well as sidings and branch lines, were built that year. The Thunder Bay branch (west from Fort William) was completed in June 1882 by the Department of Railways and Canals and turned over to the company in May 1883, permitting all-Canadian lake and railway traffic from Eastern Canada to Winnipeg for the first time. By the end of 1883, the railway had reached the Rocky Mountains, just eight kilometres (five miles) east of Kicking Horse Pass. The construction seasons of 1884 and 1885 would be spent in the mountains of British Columbia and on the north shore of Lake Superior.

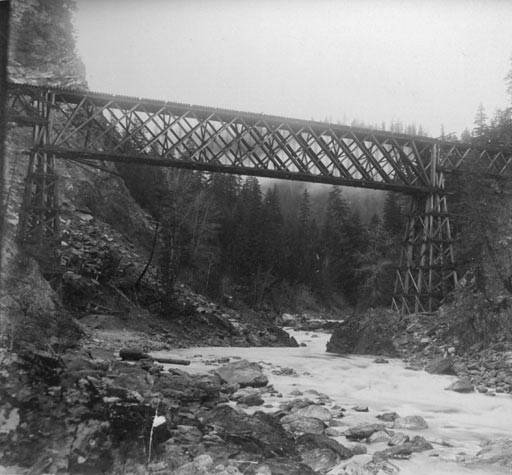
CPR trestle bridge

Many thousands of navvies worked on the railway. Many were European immigrants. In British Columbia, government contractors eventually hired 17,000 workers from China, known as "coolies". A navvy received between $1 and $2.50 per day, but had to pay for his own food, clothing, transport to the job site, mail, and medical care. After 2 1/2 months of hard labour, they could net as little as $16. Chinese labourers in British Columbia made only between 75 cents and $1.25 a day, paid in rice mats, and not including expenses, leaving barely anything to send home. They did the most dangerous construction jobs, such as working with explosives to clear tunnels through rock. The exact number of Chinese workers who died is unknown, but historians estimate the number is between 600 and 800. According to Historica Canada, it is believed that for every mile of track laid in British Columbia, there is one dead Chinese worker. The victims of sickness and accidents were not given proper funerals. Most of the remains were buried into the railway and the families of the Chinese who were killed received no compensation, or even notification of loss of life. Many of the men who survived did not have enough money to return to their families in China, although Chinese labour contractors had promised that as part of their responsibilities. Many spent years in isolated and often poor conditions. Yet the Chinese were hard working and played a key role in building the Western stretch of the railway; even some boys as young as twelve years old served as tea-boys. In 2006, the then-Prime Minister Stephen Harper offered an apology for the treatment of Chinese workers, both during and following the construction of the CPR.

By 1883, railway construction was progressing rapidly, but the CPR was in danger of running out of funds. In response, on 31 January 1884, the government passed the Railway Relief Bill, providing a further $22.5 million in loans to the CPR. The bill received royal assent on 6 March 1884.

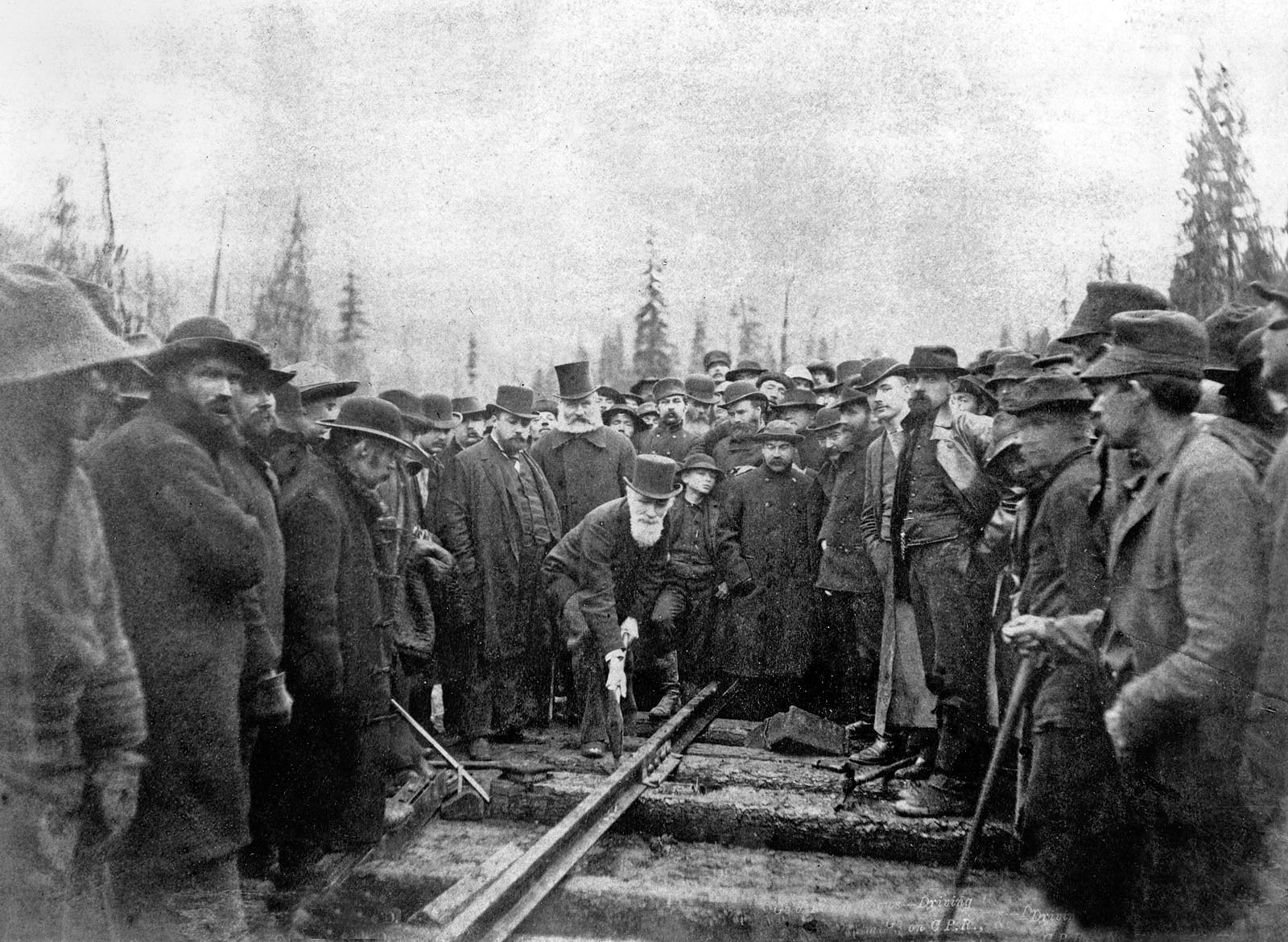
Donald Smith, later known as Lord Strathcona, drives the last spike of the Canadian Pacific Railway, at Craigellachie, 7 November 1885. Completion of the transcontinental railway was a condition of BC's entry into Confederation.

In March 1885, the North-West Rebellion broke out in the District of Saskatchewan. Van Horne, in Ottawa at the time, suggested to the government that the CPR could transport troops to Qu'Appelle, Assiniboia, in 10 days. Some sections of track were incomplete or had not been used before, but the trip to Winnipeg was made in nine days and the rebellion quickly suppressed. Perhaps because the government was grateful for this service, they subsequently reorganized the CPR's debt and provided a further $5 million loan. This money was desperately needed by the CPR. However, this government loan later became controversial. Even with Van Horne's support with moving troops to Qu'Appelle, the government still delayed in giving its support to CPR. This was due to Macdonald putting pressure on George Stephen for additional benefits. Stephen himself did admit to spending $1 million between 1881 and 1886 to ensure government support. This money went to buying a £40,000 necklace for Lady MacDonald and numerous other "bonifications" to government members.

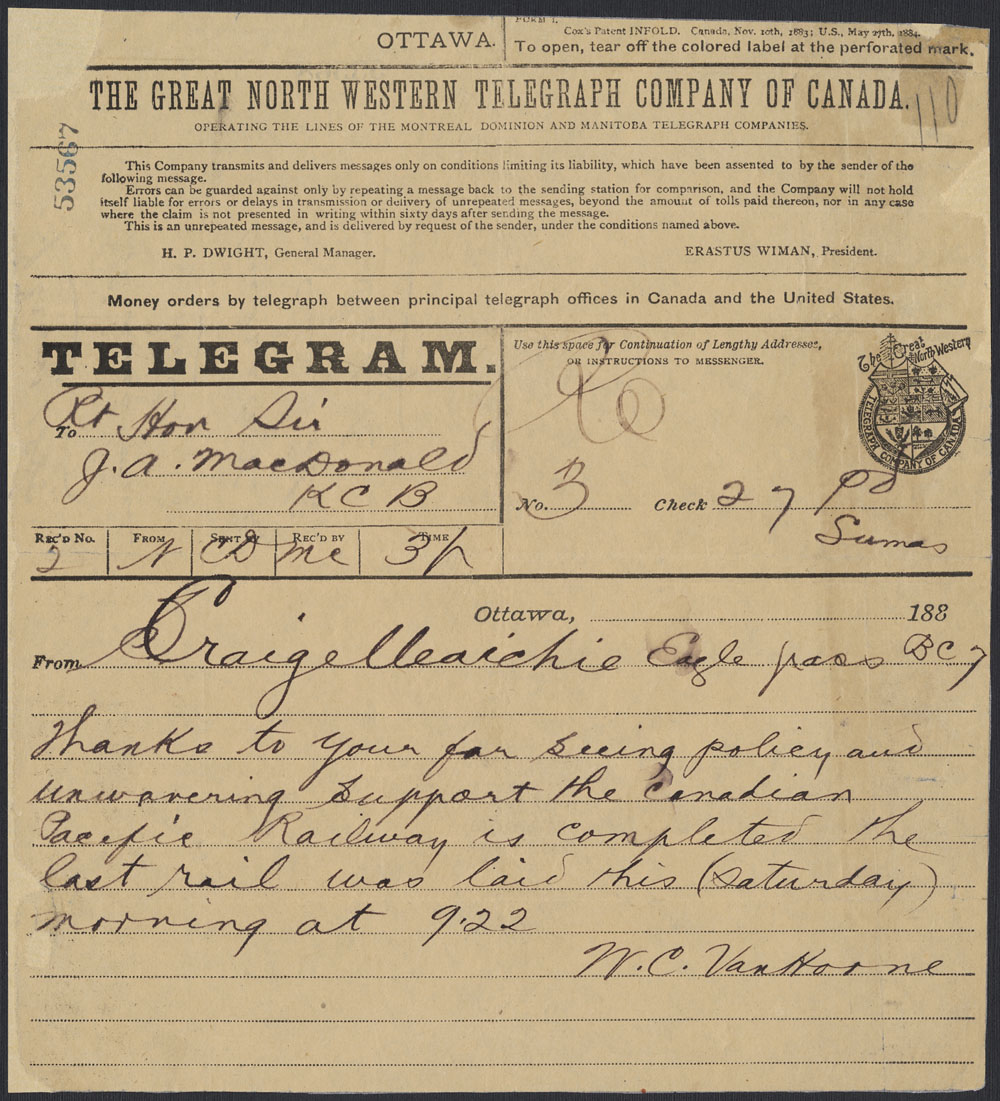
Telegram to Prime Minister John A. Macdonald announcing the completion of the Canadian Pacific Railway, 7 November 1885

On 7 November 1885, the last spike was driven at Craigellachie, British Columbia, making good on the original promise. Four days earlier, the last spike of the Lake Superior section was driven in just west of Jackfish, Ontario. While the railway was completed four years after the original 1881 deadline, it was completed more than five years ahead of the new date of 1891 that Macdonald gave in 1881. The successful construction of such a massive project, although troubled by delays and scandal, was considered an impressive feat of engineering and political will for a country with such a small population, limited capital, and difficult terrain. It was by far the longest railway ever constructed at the time. It had taken 12,000 men and 5,000 horses to construct the Lake section alone.

Meanwhile, in Eastern Canada, the CPR had created a network of lines reaching from Quebec City to St. Thomas, Ontario, by 1885 – mainly by buying the Quebec, Montreal, Ottawa & Occidental Railway from the Quebec government and by creating a new railway company, the Ontario and Quebec Railway (O&Q). It also launched a fleet of Great Lakes ships to link its terminals. Through the O&Q, the CPR had effected purchases and long-term leases of several railways, and built a line between Perth, Ontario, and Toronto (completed on 5 May 1884) to connect these acquisitions. The CPR obtained a 999-year lease on the O&Q on 4 January 1884. In 1895, it acquired a minority interest in the Toronto, Hamilton and Buffalo Railway, giving it a link to New York and the Northeast United States.

== 1886–1900 ==
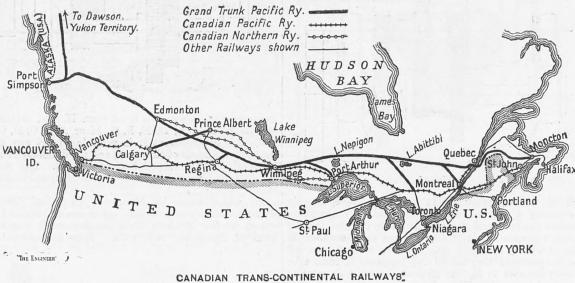
The system in 1906, soon after the construction of the transcontinental railway

The last spike in the CPR was driven on 7 November 1885, by one of its directors, Donald Smith.

The first transcontinental passenger train departed from Montreal's Dalhousie Station, located at Berri Street and Notre Dame Street at 8 pm on 28 June 1886, and arrived at Port Moody at noon on 4 July. This train consisted of two baggage cars, a mail car, one second-class coach, two immigrant sleepers, two first-class coaches, two sleeping cars and a diner (several dining cars were used throughout the journey, as they were removed from the train during the night, with another one added the next morning).

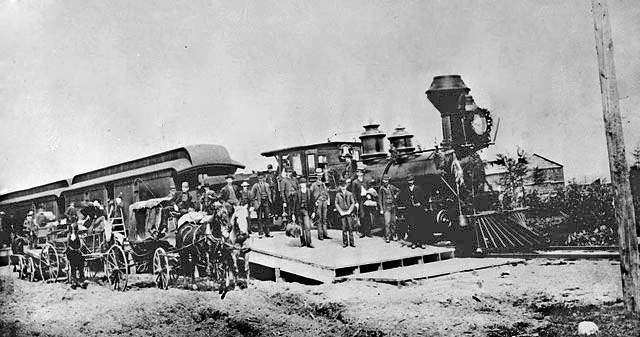
First transcontinental train arrives in Port Arthur on 30 June 1886

By that time, however, the CPR had decided to move its western terminus from Port Moody to Granville, which was renamed "Vancouver" later that year. The first official train destined for Vancouver arrived on 23 May 1887, although the line had already been in use for three months. The CPR quickly became profitable, and all loans from the federal government were repaid years ahead of time. In 1888, a branch line was opened between Sudbury and Sault Ste. Marie where the CPR connected with the American railway system and its own steamships. That same year, work was started on a line from London, Ontario, to the Canada–US border at Windsor, Ontario. That line opened on 12 June 1890.

The CPR also leased the New Brunswick Railway in 1891 for 991 years, and built the International Railway of Maine, connecting Montreal with Saint John, New Brunswick, in 1889. The connection with Saint John on the Atlantic coast made the CPR the first truly transcontinental railway company in Canada and permitted trans-Atlantic cargo and passenger services to continue year-round when sea ice in the Gulf of St. Lawrence closed the port of Montreal during the winter months. By 1896, competition with the Great Northern Railway for traffic in southern British Columbia forced the CPR to construct a second line across the province, south of the original line. Van Horne, now president of the CPR, asked for government aid, and the government agreed to provide around $3.6 million to construct a railway from Lethbridge, Alberta, through Crowsnest Pass to the south shore of Kootenay Lake, in exchange for the CPR agreeing to reduce freight rates in perpetuity for key commodities shipped in Western Canada.

The controversial Crowsnest Pass Agreement effectively locked the eastbound rate on grain products and westbound rates on certain "settlers' effects" at the 1897 level. Although temporarily suspended during the First World War, it was not until 1983 that the "Crow Rate" was permanently replaced by the Western Grain Transportation Act, which allowed the gradual increase of grain shipping prices. The Crowsnest Pass line opened on 18 June 1898, and followed a complicated route through the maze of valleys and passes in southern British Columbia, rejoining the original mainline at Hope after crossing the Cascade Mountains via Coquihalla Pass.

The Southern Mainline, generally known as the Kettle Valley Railway in British Columbia, was built in response to the booming mining and smelting economy in southern British Columbia, and the tendency of the local geography to encourage and enable easier access from neighbouring US states than from Vancouver or the rest of Canada, which was viewed to be as much of a threat to national security as it was to the province's control of its own resources. The local passenger service was re-routed to this new southerly line, which connected numerous emergent small cities across the region. Independent railways and subsidiaries that were eventually merged into the CPR in connection with this route were the Shuswap and Okanagan Railway, the Kaslo and Slocan Railway, the Columbia and Kootenay Railway, the Columbia and Western Railway and various others.

=== Settlement of western Canada ===
One of the CPR's land offerings, 1883

The CPR had built a railway that operated mostly in the wilderness. The usefulness of the prairies was questionable in the minds of many. The thinking prevailed that the prairies had great potential. Under the initial contract with the Canadian government to build the railway, the CPR was granted 100,000 square kilometres (25 million acres). Proving already to be a very resourceful organization, Canadian Pacific began an intense campaign to bring immigrants to Canada. Canadian Pacific agents operated in many overseas locations. Immigrants were often sold a package that included passage on a CP ship, travel on a CP train and land sold by the CP railway. Land was priced at $2.50 an acre and up but required cultivation. To transport immigrants, Canadian Pacific developed a fleet of over a thousand Colonist cars, low-budget sleeper cars designed to transport immigrant families from eastern Canadian seaports to the west.

== 1901–1928 ==
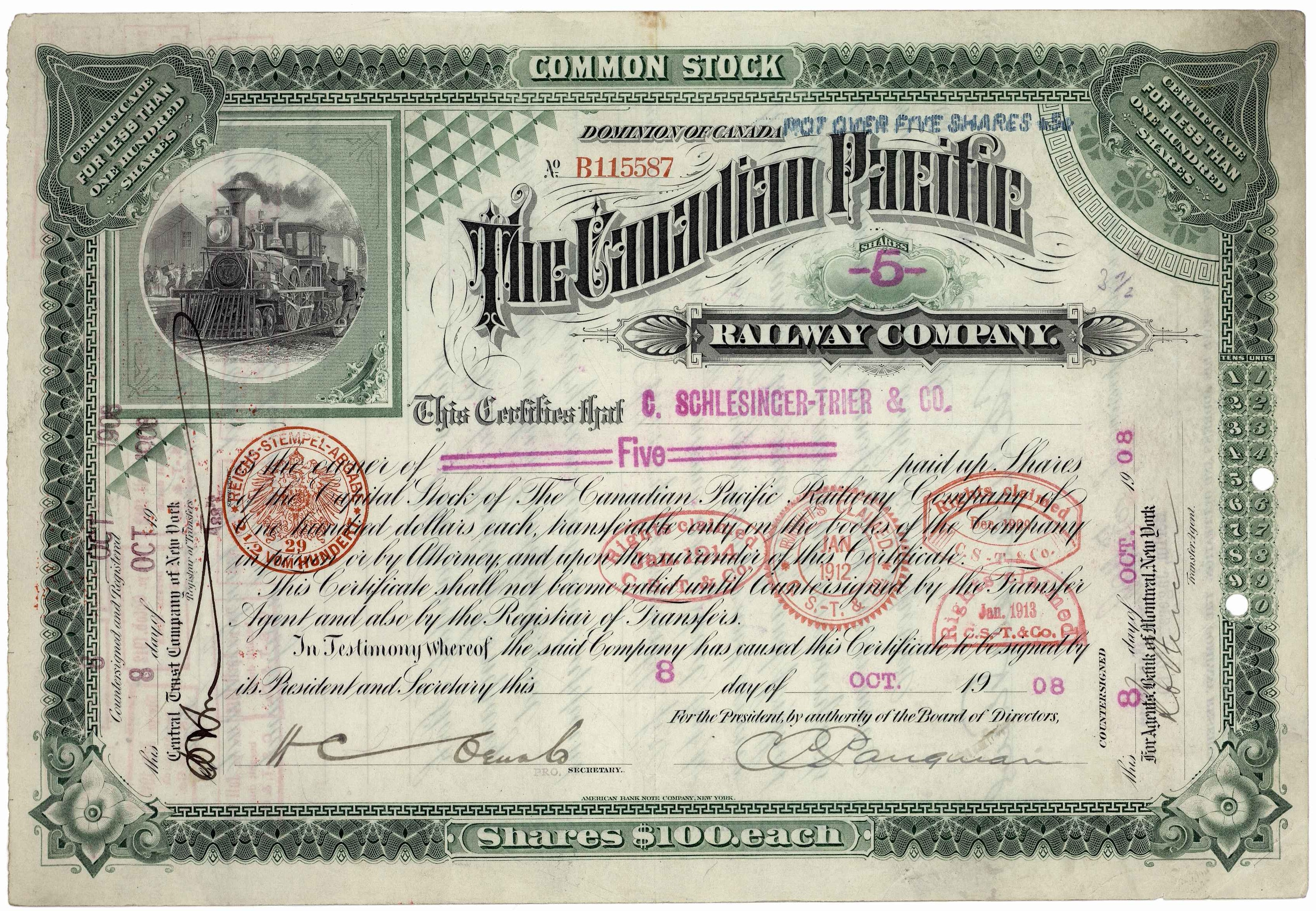
Share of the Canadian Pacific Railway Company, issued 8 October 1908

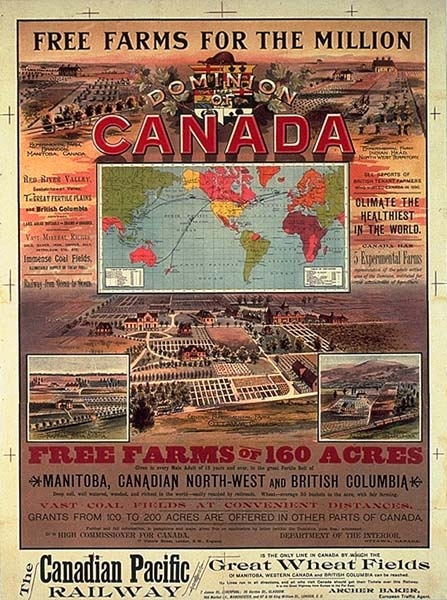
CPR advertisement highlighting "Free Farms for the Million" in western Canada, circa 1893

During the first decade of the 20th century, the CPR continued to build more lines. In 1908, the CPR opened a line connecting Toronto with Sudbury. Previously, westbound traffic originating in southern Ontario took a circuitous route through eastern Ontario. Several operational improvements were also made to the railway in Western Canada. In 1909 the CPR completed two significant engineering accomplishments. The most significant was the replacement of the Big Hill, which had become a major bottleneck in the CPR's main line, with the Spiral Tunnels, reducing the grade to 2.2 percent from 4.5 percent. The Spiral Tunnels opened in August. In April 1908, the CPR started work to replace the Old Calgary-Edmonton Rail Bridge across the Red Deer River with a new standard steel bridge that was completed by March 1909.

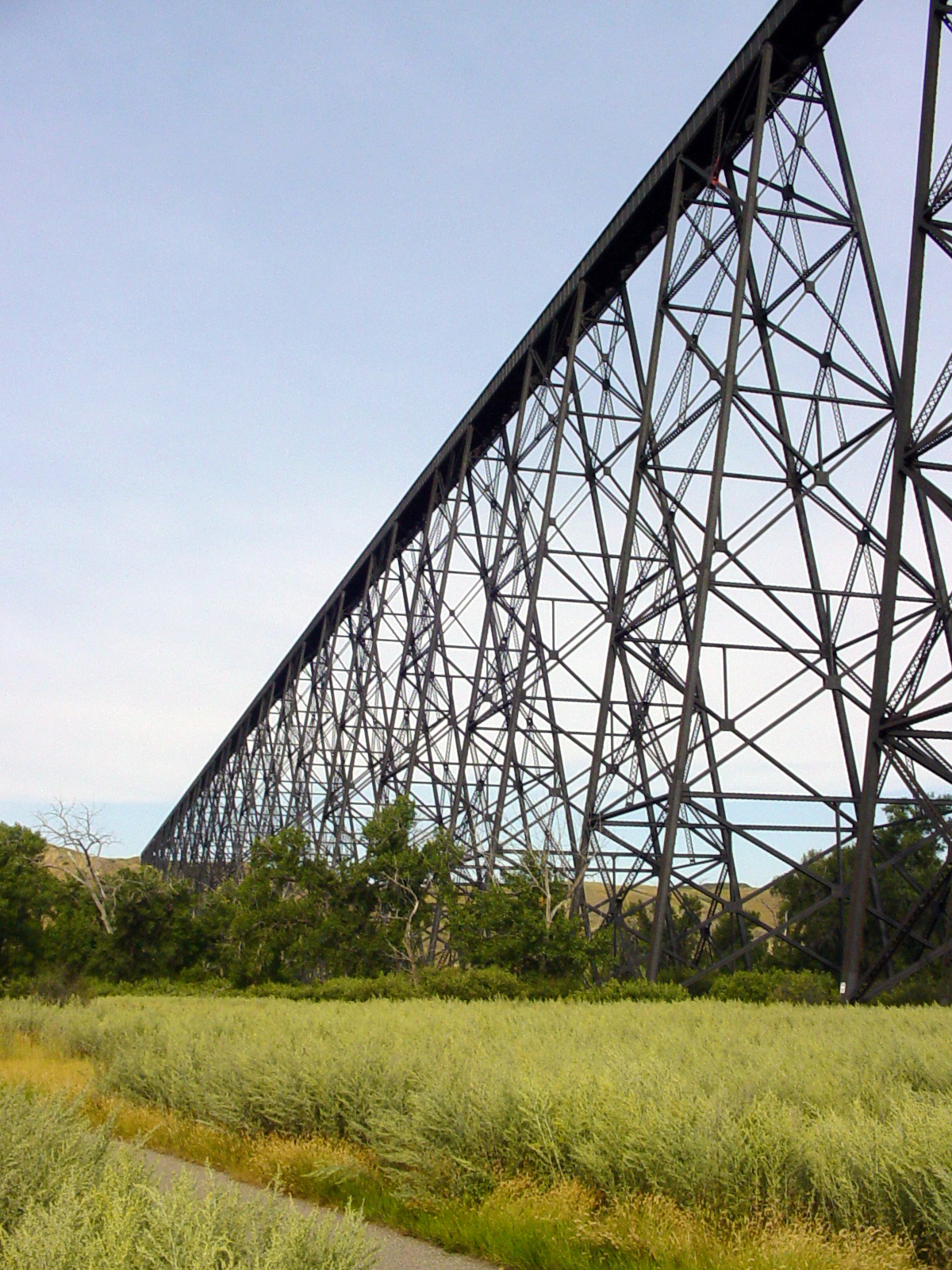
Lethbridge Viaduct

On 3 November 1909, the Lethbridge Viaduct over the Oldman River valley at Lethbridge, Alberta, was opened. It is 1,624 metres (5,328 feet) long and, at its maximum, 96 metres (315 feet) high, making it one of the longest railway bridges in Canada. In 1916, the CPR replaced its line through Rogers Pass, which was prone to avalanches (the most serious of which killed 62 men in 1910) with the Connaught Tunnel, an eight-kilometre-long (5-mile) tunnel under Mount Macdonald that was, at the time of its opening, the longest railway tunnel in the Western Hemisphere.

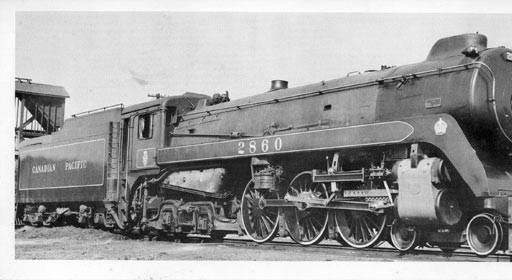
C.P.R. railway locomotive 2860

On 21 January 1910, a passenger train derailed on the CPR line at the Spanish River bridge at Nairn, Ontario (near Sudbury), killing at least 43.

The CPR acquired several smaller railways via long-term leases in 1912. On 3 January 1912, the CPR acquired the Dominion Atlantic Railway, a railway that ran in western Nova Scotia. This acquisition gave the CPR a connection to Halifax, a significant port on the Atlantic Ocean. The Dominion Atlantic was isolated from the rest of the CPR network and used the CNR to facilitate interchange; the DAR also operated ferry services across the Bay of Fundy for passengers and cargo (but not rail cars) from the port of Digby, Nova Scotia, to the CPR at Saint John, New Brunswick. DAR steamships also provided connections for passengers and cargo between Yarmouth, Boston and New York. On 1 July 1912, the CPR acquired the Esquimalt and Nanaimo Railway, a railway on Vancouver Island that connected to the CPR using a railcar ferry. The CPR acquired the Quebec Central Railway on 14 December 1912.

During the late 19th century, the railway undertook an ambitious programme of hotel construction, building Glacier House in Glacier National Park, Mount Stephen House at Field, British Columbia, the Château Frontenac in Quebec City and the Banff Springs Hotel. By then, the CPR had competition from three other transcontinental lines, all of them money-losers. In 1919, these lines were consolidated, along with the track of the old Intercolonial Railway and its spurs, into the government-owned Canadian National Railways. The CPR suffered its greatest loss of life when one of its steamships, the Empress of Ireland, sank after a collision with the Norwegian collier SS Storstad. On 29 May 1914, the Empress (operated by the CPR's Canadian Pacific Steamship Company) went down in the St. Lawrence River with the loss of 1,024 lives, of which 840 were passengers.

== First World War ==
During the First World War, CPR put the entire resources of the "world's greatest travel system" at the disposal of the British Empire, not only trains and tracks, but also its ships, shops, hotels, telegraphs and, above all, its people. Aiding the war effort meant transporting and billeting troops; building and supplying arms and munitions; arming, lending and selling ships. Fifty-two CPR ships were pressed into service during World War I, carrying more than a million troops and passengers and four million tons of cargo. Twenty seven survived and returned to CPR. CPR also helped the war effort with money and jobs. CPR made loans and guarantees to the Allies of some $100 million. As a lasting tribute, CPR commissioned three statues and 23 memorial tablets to commemorate the efforts of those who fought and those who died in the war. After the war, the Federal government created Canadian National Railways (CNR, later CN) out of several bankrupt railways that fell into government hands during and after the war. CNR would become the main competitor to the CPR in Canada. In 1923, Henry Worth Thornton replaced David Blyth Hanna becoming the second president of the CNR, and his competition spurred Edward Wentworth Beatty, the first Canadian-born president of the CPR, to action. During this time the railway land grants were formalized.

== Great Depression and the Second World War, 1929–1945 ==
The Great Depression, which lasted from 1929 until 1939, hit many companies heavily. While the CPR was affected, it was not affected to the extent of its rival CNR because it, unlike the CNR, was debt-free. The CPR scaled back on some of its passenger and freight services and stopped issuing dividends to its shareholders after 1932. Hard times led to the creation of new political parties such as the Social Credit movement and the Cooperative Commonwealth Federation, as well as popular protest in the form of the On-to-Ottawa Trek.

One highlight of the late 1930s, both for the railway and for Canada, was the visit of King George VI and Queen Elizabeth during their 1939 royal tour of Canada, the first time that the reigning monarch had visited the country. The CPR and the CNR shared the honours of pulling the royal train across the country, with the CPR undertaking the westbound journey from Quebec City to Vancouver. Later that year, the Second World War began. As it had done in World War I, the CPR devoted much of its resources to the war effort. It retooled its Angus Shops in Montreal to produce Valentine tanks and other armoured vehicles, and transported troops and resources across the country. Additionally, 22 of the CPR's ships went to war, 12 of which were sunk.

== 1946–1978 ==
After the Second World War, the transportation industry in Canada changed. Where railways had previously provided almost universal freight and passenger services, cars, trucks and airplanes started to take traffic away from railways. This naturally helped the CPR's air and trucking operations, and the railway's freight operations continued to thrive hauling resource traffic and bulk commodities. However, passenger trains quickly became unprofitable. During the 1950s, the railway introduced new innovations in passenger service. In 1955, it introduced The Canadian, a new luxury transcontinental train. However, in the 1960s, the company started to pull out of passenger services, ending services on many of its branch lines. It also discontinued its secondary transcontinental train The Dominion in 1966, and in 1970, unsuccessfully applied to discontinue The Canadian. For the next eight years, it continued to apply to discontinue the service, and service on The Canadian declined markedly. On 29 October 1978, CP Rail transferred its passenger services to Via Rail, a new federal Crown corporation that is responsible for managing all intercity passenger service formerly handled by both CP Rail and CN. Via eventually took almost all of its passenger trains, including The Canadian, off CP's lines.

In 1968, as part of a corporate reorganization, each of the major operations, including its rail operations, were organized as separate subsidiaries. The name of the railway was changed to CP Rail, and the parent company changed its name to Canadian Pacific Limited in 1971. Its air, express, telecommunications, hotel and real estate holdings were spun off, and ownership of all of the companies transferred to Canadian Pacific Investments. The slogan was: "TO THE FOUR CORNERS OF THE WORLD" The company discarded its beaver logo, adopting the new Multimark (which, when mirrored by an adjacent "multi-mark" creates a diamond appearance on a globe) that was used – with a different colour background – for each of its operations.

== 1979–2001 ==
=== The 1979 Mississauga train derailment ===
On 10 November 1979, a derailment of a hazardous materials train in Mississauga, Ontario, led to the evacuation of 200,000 people; there were no fatalities. Mississauga Mayor Hazel McCallion threatened to sue Canadian Pacific for the derailment. Part of the compromise was to accept GO Transit commuter rail service along the Galt Subdivision corridor up to Milton, Ontario. Limited trains ran along the Milton line on weekdays only. Expansions to Cambridge, Ontario may be coming in the future.

In 1984, CP Rail commenced construction of the Mount Macdonald Tunnel to augment the Connaught Tunnel under the Selkirk Mountains. The first revenue train passed through the tunnel in 1988. At 14.7 km (nine miles), it is the longest tunnel in the Americas. During the 1980s, the Soo Line Railroad, in which CP Rail still owned a controlling interest, underwent several changes. It acquired the Minneapolis, Northfield and Southern Railway in 1982. Then on 21 February 1985, the Soo Line obtained a controlling interest in the bankrupt Milwaukee Road, merging it into its system on 1 January 1986. Also in 1980, Canadian Pacific bought out the controlling interests of the Toronto, Hamilton and Buffalo Railway (TH&B) from Conrail and molded it into the Canadian Pacific System, dissolving the TH&B's name from the books in 1985. In 1987, most of CPR's trackage in the Great Lakes region, including much of the original Soo Line, were spun off into a new railway, the Wisconsin Central, which was subsequently purchased by CN. Influenced by the Canada-U.S. Free Trade Agreement of 1989, which liberalized trade between the two nations, the CPR's expansion continued during the early 1990s: CP Rail gained full control of the Soo Line in 1990, adding the "System" to the former's name, and bought the Delaware and Hudson Railway in 1991. These two acquisitions gave CP Rail routes to the major American cities of Chicago (via the Soo Line and Milwaukee Road as part of its historically logical route) and New York City (via the D&H).

During the 1990s, both CP Rail and CN attempted unsuccessfully to buy out the eastern assets of the other, so as to permit further rationalization. In 1996, CP Rail moved its head office from Windsor Station in Montreal to Gulf Canada Square in Calgary and changed its name back to Canadian Pacific Railway.

In 1997, the lines west of the Chicago suburb of Elgin, Illinois, were put up for sale by CP citing low profit margins. The I&M Rail Link signed on that year and began operating on those lines. The Washington Corporation divested of the I&M in 2001, citing its lack of profitability. The Dakota, Minnesota & Eastern Railroad acquired the assets of IMRL, and reorganized the latter in 2002 to the Iowa, Chicago & Eastern Railroad. Within a few years, the IC&E gained profitability and Canadian Pacific acquired the DM&E and IC&E in 2008, placing the lines west of Elgin back under the ownership of CP after eleven years.

A new subsidiary company, the St. Lawrence and Hudson Railway, was created to operate its money-losing lines in eastern North America, covering Quebec, Southern and Eastern Ontario, trackage rights to Chicago, Illinois, (on Norfolk Southern lines from Detroit) as well as the Delaware and Hudson Railway in the northeastern United States. However, the new subsidiary, threatened with being sold off and free to innovate, quickly spun off money-losing track to short lines, instituted scheduled freight service, and produced an unexpected turn-around in profitability. On 1 January 2001 the StL&H was formally amalgamated with the CP Rail system.

== 2001–2023 ==
In 2001, the CPR's parent company, Canadian Pacific Limited, spun off its five subsidiaries, including the CPR, into independent companies. Most of the company's non-railway businesses at the time of the split were operated by a separate subsidiary called Canadian Pacific Limited. Canadian Pacific Railway formally (but, not legally) shortened its name to Canadian Pacific in early 2007, dropping the word "railway" in order to reflect more operational flexibility. Shortly after the name revision, Canadian Pacific announced that it had committed to becoming a major sponsor and logistics provider to the 2010 Olympic Winter Games in Vancouver.

On 4 September 2007, CPR announced it was acquiring the Dakota, Minnesota and Eastern Railroad from London-based Electra Private Equity. The transaction was an "end-to-end" consolidation and gave CPR access to United States shippers of agricultural products, ethanol and coal. CPR stated its intention to use this purchase to gain access to the rich coalfields of Wyoming's Powder River Basin. The purchase price was US$1.48 billion with future payments of over US$1 billion contingent on commencement of construction on the smaller railway's Powder River extension and specified volumes of coal shipments from the Powder River Basin. The transaction was subject to approval of the U.S. Surface Transportation Board (STB), which was expected to take about a year. On 4 October 2007, CPR announced that it had completed financial transactions required for the acquisition, placing the DM&E and IC&E in a voting trust with Richard Hamlin appointed as trustee. The merger was completed as of 31 October 2008.

In 2010, four repainted Canadian Pacific AC4400CWs were used in the filming of the movie Unstoppable.

On 28 October 2011, in a Schedule 13D filing, the U.S. hedge fund Pershing Square Capital Management (PSCM) indicated it owned 12.2 percent of Canadian Pacific. PSCM began acquiring Canadian Pacific shares in 2011. The stake eventually increased to 14.2 percent, making PSCM the railway's largest shareholder. At a meeting with the company that month, Pershing's head Bill Ackman proposed replacing Fred Green as CP's chief executive. Just hours before the railway's annual shareholder meeting on Thursday, 17 May 2012, Green and five other board members, including chairman John Cleghorn, resigned. The seven nominees, including Ackman and his partner, Paul Hilal, were then elected. The reconstituted board, having named Stephen Tobias (former vice president and chief operating officer of Norfolk Southern Railroad) as interim CEO, initiated a search for a new CEO, eventually settling on E. Hunter Harrison, former president of Canadian National Railway, on 29 June 2012.

Canadian Pacific Railway Ltd. trains resumed regular operations on 1 June 2012 after a nine-day strike by some 4,800 locomotive engineers, conductors and traffic controllers who walked off the job on 23 May, stalling Canadian freight traffic and costing the economy an estimated CA$80 million (US$77 million). The strike ended with a government back-to-work bill forcing both sides to come to a binding agreement.

On 6 July 2013, a unit train of crude oil which CP had subcontracted to short-line operator Montreal, Maine and Atlantic Railway derailed in Lac-Mégantic, killing 47. On 14 August 2013, the Quebec government added the CPR, along with lessor World Fuel Services (WFS), to the list of corporate entities from which it seeks reimbursement for the environmental cleanup of the Lac-Mégantic derailment. On 15 July, the press reported that CP would appeal the legal order. Railway spokesman Ed Greenberg stated "Canadian Pacific has reviewed the notice. As a matter of fact, in law, CP is not responsible for this cleanup." In February 2014, Harrison called for immediate action to phase-out DOT-111 tank cars, known to be more dangerous in cases of derailment.

On 12 October 2014 it was reported that Canadian Pacific had tried to enter into a merger with American railway CSX, but was unsuccessful.

In 2015–16 Canadian Pacific sought to merge with American railway Norfolk Southern. and wanted to have a shareholder vote on it. Canadian Pacific created a website to persuade people that the Canadian Pacific/Norfolk Southern merger would benefit the rail industry. However, this proposed merger would come under scrutiny by the U.S. Department of Justice over antitrust concerns created by the proposed merger. Canadian Pacific filed a complaint against the U.S. DOJ and dropped their proposed proxy fight in the proposed merger with Norfolk Southern. The proposed merger was also opposed by rival freight company, the United Parcel Service (UPS), who spoke out about the rail merger and said they were against the Canadian Pacific/Norfolk Southern merger. CP ultimately terminated its efforts to merge on 11 April 2016.

On 18 January 2017 it was announced that Hunter Harrison was retiring from CP and that Keith Creel would become president and chief executive officer of the company effective 31 January 2017.

On 4 February 2019, a loaded grain train ran away from the siding at Partridge just above the Upper Spiral Tunnel in Kicking Horse Pass. The 112-car grain train with three locomotives derailed into the Kicking Horse River just after the Trans Canada Highway overpass. The three crew members on the lead locomotive were killed. The Canadian Pacific Police Service (CPPS) investigated the fatal derailment. It later came to light that, although Creel said that the RCMP "retain jurisdiction" over the investigation, the RCMP wrote that "it never had jurisdiction because the crash happened on CP property". On 26 January 2020, Canadian current affairs program The Fifth Estate broadcast an episode on the derailment, and the next day the Canadian Transportation Safety Board (TSB) called for the RCMP to investigate as lead investigator Don Crawford said, "There is enough to suspect there's negligence here and it needs to be investigated by the proper authority".

On 4 February 2020, the TSB demoted its lead investigator in the crash probe after his superiors decided these comments were "completely inappropriate". The TSB stated that it "does not share the view of the lead safety investigator". The CPPS say they did a thorough investigation into the actions of the crew, which is now closed and resulted in no charges, while the Alberta Federation of Labour and the Teamsters Canada Rail Conference called for an independent police probe.

On 20 November 2019, it was announced that Canadian Pacific would purchase the Central Maine and Quebec Railway from Fortress Transportation and Infrastructure Investors. The line had had a series of different owners since being spun off of the Canadian Pacific in 1995. The first operator was the Canadian American Railroad a division of Iron Road Railways. In 2002 the Montreal, Maine & Atlantic took over operations after CDAC declared bankruptcy. The Central, Maine and Quebec Railway started operations in 2014 after the MMA declared bankruptcy due to the Lac-Mégantic derailment. On this new acquisition, CP CEO Keith Creel remarked that this gives CP a true coast-to-coast network across Canada and an increased presence in New England. On June 4, 2020; Canadian Pacific bought the Central Maine and Quebec.

=== Merger with Kansas City Southern (2021–2023) ===
On March 21, 2021, CP announced that it was planning to purchase the Kansas City Southern Railway (KCS) for US$29 billion. The US Surface Transportation Board (STB) would first have to approve the purchase, which was expected to be completed by the middle of 2022.

However, a competing cash and stock offer was later made by Canadian National Railway (CN) on April 20 at $33.7 billion. On May 13, KCS announced that they planned to accept the merger offer from CN, but would give CP until May 21 to come up with a higher bid. On May 21, KCS and CN agreed to a merger. However, CN's merger attempt was blocked by a STB ruling in August that the company could not use a voting trust to assume control of KCS, due to concerns about potentially reduced competition in the railroad industry.

On September 12, KCS accepted a new $31 billion offer from CP. Though CP's offer was lower than the offer made by CN, the STB permitted CP to use a voting trust to take control of KCS. The voting trust allowed CP to become the beneficial owner of KCS in December, but the two railroads operated independently until receiving approval for a merger of operations from the STB. That approval came on March 15, 2023, which permitted the railroads to merge as soon as April 14. Post merger, the combined railroad would rebrand under a new name: Canadian Pacific Kansas City (CPKC). On April 14, 2023, CP and the Kansas City Southern Railway merged into one, forming CPKC.
