= Andrews Field (baseball) =

Baseball stadium in Brandon, Manitoba, Canada

- Location within Manitoba Location within Canada Location within North America
- Interactive map of Andrews Field
- Former names: Westbran Stadium (1987-2007)
- Address: 2000 Hilton Ave, Brandon, MB R7B 4B2, Canada
- Location: Brandon, Manitoba, Canada
- Coordinates: 49.8547°N 99.9649°W
- Owner: City of Brandon
- Capacity: 2,000 (baseball)
- Surface: Grass
- Field size: Left field: 328 ft (100 m); Center field: 400 ft (120 m); Right field: 328 ft (100 m)

Construction
- Opened: 1987
- Cost: $1.3 million ($3.12 million in 2025 dollars)

Tenants
- Brandon Grey Owls (PL) 1995–1996; West Man Wranglers (PL) 1997; Wheat City Whiskey Jacks (ExL) 2019

Andrews Field, formerly known as Westbran Stadium, is a baseball stadium located in the city of Brandon, Manitoba, Canada.

== History ==
Westbran Stadium, as it was originally known, was constructed in 1987 at a cost of $1.3 million. Since its opening, the stadium has hosted a number of provincial, national, and international tournaments, including two World Under-18 Championships, two Canadian Senior Championships, and the 1997 Canada Summer Games baseball tournament. During the 1997 Summer Games, a TSN broadcaster commented that Westbran Stadium was "as good as many Triple-A fields".

In 2007, the stadium was renamed Andrews Field in recognition of the late Neil Andrews, a long time volunteer and local baseball executive.

The ballpark was renovated and refurbished in 2019 in preparation for the Wheat City Whiskey Jacks, who began play in the summer-collegiate Expedition League for the 2019 season. The Whiskey Jacks didn't play in 2020 due to the COVID-19 pandemic and relocated to Grand Forks, North Dakota for the 2021 summer baseball season.

Andrews Field was among the top eight chosen for Canada's Favourite Ballpark, a contest held in 2011 by Baseball Canada.

== Major events ==
- 1991 World Under-18 Baseball Championship
- 1994 World Under-18 Baseball Championship
- 1997 Canada Summer Games
- 2006 Canadian Senior Baseball Championship
- 2008 Canadian Senior Baseball Championship
