= Brandon Community Sportsplex =

Recreation facility in Brandon, Manitoba

Coordinates: 49°52′01″N 99°56′54″W

The Brandon Community Sportsplex is a multipurpose recreation facility located in the city of Brandon, Manitoba, Canada.

The Sportsplex was built by the City of Brandon in the mid 1970s as a venue for the 1979 Canada Winter Games. It features an indoor ice hockey arena, a 50 metre swimming pool, racquetball courts, and track and field facilities. Since the 1979 Winter Games, the Sportsplex has been made available to the public for recreational use.

The hockey arena is one of four indoor arenas that serve the city of Brandon, the other three being located within the Keystone Centre. The Sportsplex is home to the Brandon Wheat Kings of the Manitoba Midget 'AAA' Hockey League and is also used by the city's minor hockey, speed skating, and figure skating programs.

The Sportsplex was once again used as a venue for the Canada Games in 1997 when Brandon hosted the Summer Games. In preparation for the games, its facilities received extensive upgrades.

The swimming pool was slated for closure in 2011, but after public pressure to keep it open, Brandon city council decided not to close the pool. As a result, the city now has two pools, the other being at the local YMCA.

The track underwent a complete resurfacing in 2017 and the venue was successful hosts of the 2017 and 2018 Royal Canadian Legion National Youth Track and Field Championships.
