= Moncton Sports Dome =

Sport facility in Moncton, New Brunswick

Coordinates: 46°05′34″N 64°48′58″W

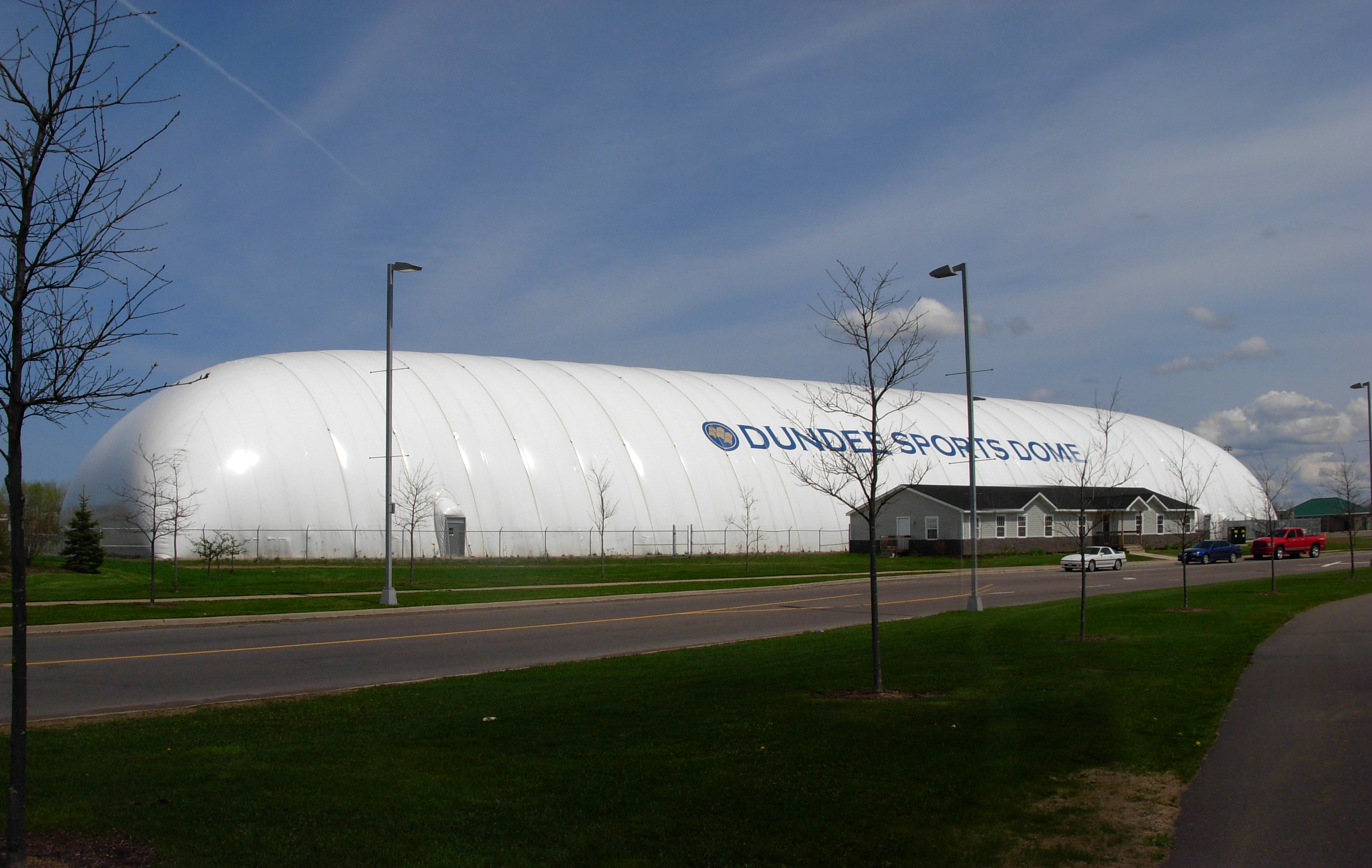
The exterior of the Moncton SportsDome

The Moncton SportsDome is a sporting facility in Moncton, New Brunswick, Canada, that offers a variety of activities such as paintball, soccer, Laser tag, golf range and Canadian football. It is an air supported structure that measures 400 feet (120 m) long, 118 feet (36 m) wide, and 50 feet (15 m) high. It comprises two, 175-foot (53 m) long by 100-foot (30 m) wide synthetic fields with additional space outside the fields for walking and spectating.

== See also ==
- Moncton Sport Facilities
