= Shaarey Zedek Cemetery =

Shaarey Zedek Cemetery may refer to:

- Shaarey Zedek Cemetery (Winnipeg)
- Shaare Zedek Cemetery, Jerusalem

== See also ==
- Shaare Zedek (disambiguation)
