= Radisson School =

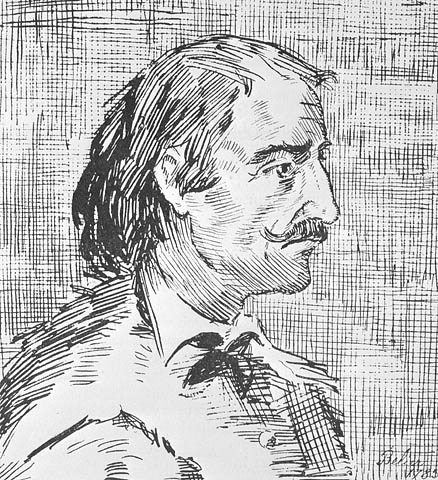
- The eponymous Pierre-Esprit Radisson

Location
- 1105 Winona St., Transcona, Winnipeg, Manitoba R2C 2P9; 49.9027°N 97.0085°W

Information
- Former name: Radisson Elementary School
- Established: 1957; 69 years ago
- School district: River East Transcona School Division
- Grades: K-5
- Website: retsd.mb.ca/rad

Radisson School, originally Radisson Elementary School, is a K-5 school that is part of River East Transcona School Division in Winnipeg, Manitoba.

Part of a tri-school campus in Transcona, the school's immediate neighbours are John W. Gunn Middle School and Transcona Collegiate.

It was built in 1957 and was originally an eight-room building. Radisson was named for famed fur trader Pierre-Esprit Radisson, the unanimous choice of the students. Margaret Underhill was the first principal of the school and first female principal in the division.
