= Murdoch MacKay Collegiate =

Location
- 260 Redonda Street; Winnipeg, Manitoba, R2C 1L6; Canada; 49.8985°N 96.9779°W

Information
- School type: Public high school
- Motto: Carpe Diem (Seize the Day)
- Founded: 1963
- School district: River East Transcona School Division
- Principal: Brian Straub
- Grades: 9 - 12
- Language: English
- Colours: Green and Black
- Team name: Murdoch Mackay
- Website: retsd.mb.ca/school/mur/Pages/default.aspx

Murdoch MacKay Collegiate is a public, co-ed high school in the River East Transcona School Division, located in Winnipeg, Manitoba.

== History ==
The school was named after Murdoch Mackay, a prominent politician, leader of the Manitoba Liberal Party, member of the provincial legislature and long-time Transcona resident. MacKay taught school in his hometown of Melville, Nova Scotia, before coming west and graduating from Manitoba Medical School in 1916.

When the building opened in September 1963, one year after his death, his wife, Ruby, attended the official dedication ceremony and laying of the cornerstone. The red brick structure opened with 22 rooms, but has undergone numerous expansions since, which have included the addition of Power Mechanics, Aerospace, and Fashion Technology vocational areas. Murdoch also offers a full range of Advanced Placement courses.

== Academics overview ==
The school offers a rigorous college preparatory curriculum, including three tracks (basic, college preparatory, and Honors/AP) for all core academic courses. The school offers vocational diplomas in Power Mechanics, an accredited Metal Fabrication program (Level 1 Red Seal Machining, Level 1 Red Seal Tool & Die, certified CWB testing facility), Building Construction and Fashion Technology. In addition, the school offers a variety of elective courses from which to choose, allowing students much control in determining their course of study above and beyond the school's graduation requirements. Industrial Arts courses in Graphic Arts, Photography, Multimedia, Electronics and Woods are also offered as optional courses.

== Administration ==
The current administration of the school includes principal Mr. Brian Straub, and vice principals Ms. Desiree Penner, Mr. Derek Paul and Mr. Don Claudio

== Athletics ==
Murdoch has a rich history of competitive and championship caliber athletic teams. Murdoch's biggest rivals include Transcona Collegiate Institute and Collège Pierre-Elliott-Trudeau.

In 2001, the Murdoch MacKay hockey team won its final 8 games in a row, including a playoff game over rival and neighboring school Pierre Elliot Trudeau en route to a B-Side championship.

In the 2016–17 season Murdoch swept throughout the playoffs and won their second championship, the next year (2017–18) Murdoch became back-to-back champions again sweeping through the playoffs.

In 2010, the Murdoch Football Team won its first WHSFL Vidruk Division Championship with an 11 - 4 victory over the Kildonan East Reivers at Canad Inns Stadium.

In July 2020 as per an email with Murdoch's administrators and over 800 signatures on an online petition, It was announced that the Clansmen name was dropped and sports teams will now be known as Murdoch MacKay with all Clansmen references removed.

In 2024 the Murdoch Mackay Junior Varsity Boys Volleyball team achieved provincial recognition as the schools strongest team in history, as a historically underserved and underfunded volleyball program. The team qualified for MHSAA JV AAAA Provincials for first time in school history, though the team had lost in playoffs to the CJS Olympiens.

== Notable alumni ==
- Susan Auch, Canadian Olympic Speed Skater
- Bradford How, Much Music VJ
- Russ Romaniuk, Professional Hockey Player (NHL)
- Kory Scoran, Professional Hockey Player
- Zack Williams, Professional Football Player for the Calgary Stampeders
- Billie Cross Member of the legislative assembly for Seine River
