= River East Collegiate =

Coordinates: 49.9431°N 97.0809°W

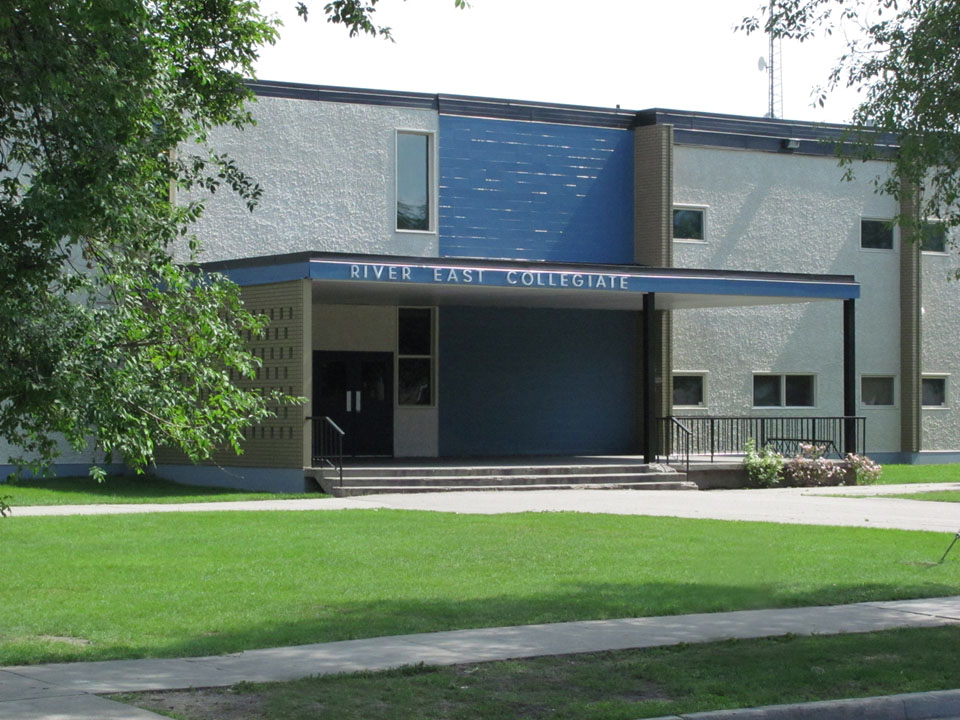

Location
- 295 Sutton Avenue; Winnipeg, Manitoba; Canada

Information
- Type: Public High School
- Established: 1960
- School district: River East Transcona School Division
- Superintendent: Sandra Herbst
- Principal: Brian Locken
- Faculty: 80
- Grades: Grade 9–Grade 12
- Enrollment: 1,200
- Colours: Blue and White
- Mascot: Kody (Kodiak bear)
- Website: www.retsd.mb.ca/rec

River East Collegiate is a public high school located in Winnipeg, Manitoba, that belongs to the River East Transcona School Division. River East has a school population of approximately 1,250 students. The school colours are blue and white and the school mascot is the Kodiak bear (Kody).

== Programs ==
=== Music ===
Concert Band

The River East Collegiate Concert band, under the direction of Les Chalmers, is a regular course offered by River East Collegiate. Students enrolled perform pieces by both modern and classical composers such as Richard Strauss, Led Zeppelin, and Gustav Holst at bi-annual school concerts. Throughout the year, students are not forced to play solos or have tests. Enrollment in Concert Band is worth one credit, and is generally considered to be a prerequisite for the following instrumental music courses.

Percussion Ensemble

The River East Collegiate Percussion Ensemble, under the direction of Marshall Fehr, rehearses once a week at lunch, and participation is strictly voluntary. The ensemble uses a variety of percussive instruments and focuses on developing and refining rhythmic skills. The ensemble performs numerous times throughout the year.

Contemporary Music Ensemble

The REC Contemporary Music Ensemble, under the direction of Les Chalmers, is a student-led program where students choose pieces, rehearsal times, and performances outside of regular school hours. The group(s), when approved, may perform at school events, such as Open Houses and concerts. Piece(s) by Polyphia, Ella Fitzgerald, and Paul Desmond, as well as original compositions, have all been performed by the ensemble.

Jazz Band

The River East Collegiate Jazz Band, under the direction of Les Chalmers, meets twice weekly after school. It is considered an anomaly amongst high school jazz bands. The REC Jazz Band is a no-cut ensemble (except for rhythm section, which is one to a part. However, auxiliary percussion parts are available to those who audition for a rhythm section instrument and don't get the top spot). Approximately 70 students are part of this band, performing pieces by jazz composers such as Duke Ellington, Charles Mingus, and Miles Davis at bi-annual school jazz concerts (which are often separate from concert band) and the Brandon Jazz Festival. Throughout the year, students are not forced to play solos or have tests. Enrollment in Jazz Band is worth one credit.

Jazz Orchestra

The River East Collegiate Jazz Orchestra, under the direction of Les Chalmers, meets for rehearsal three times a week after school. Unlike the school's Jazz Band, Jazz Orchestra is an auditioned group that is strictly one musician for each part. The acceptance into Jazz Orchestra is primarily based on skill, potential, and experience. While the band participates in numerous festivals every year, it is best known for participating in the Essentially Ellington High School Jazz Band Competition and Festival, which takes place each year at Lincoln Center in New York City. The band has been invited to play at the festival five times since 2003 (2003, 2004, 2007, 2008, and 2011). As of 2011, it is the only Canadian band to ever be invited to the festival. The Jazz Orchestra has been invited many times to play before the Winnipeg Jazz Orchestra. Enrollment in Jazz Orchestra is worth one credit.

=== Choir ===
REC has two audition vocal jazz groups, Vocaleas and Jazzmyn. Jazzmyn is a vocal group that rehearses twice a week. Vocalese also rehearses twice a week but is a program for elite singers only.

Occasionally, in choral, guest artists such as Winnipeg Symphony Orchestra have worked with the choral group. Students can audition to be solo. The style of music in the choir uses modern and traditional. The choral group also has winter and spring concerts and also participates in the Winnipeg Music Festival.

Grade 10, 11 and 12, the choir course is called choral. The course is aimed at vocal technique and style for performance. Performance music includes popular and traditional styles. Students must attend all the concerts. Performances include winter and spring concerts and the Winnipeg Music Festival.

==== Extracurricular choir programs ====
There are three choral performing ensembles at River East Collegiate: Vocal Jazz (Jazzmyn), Chamber Choir, and Vocalease. All courses are run by Ms. Ens. The Vocal Jazz 20G course is worth 1 credit. This course allows gifted and talented vocalists to sing advanced four-part music together in a vocal jazz style. Enrollment is limited to 16 students (four students per vocal part). Performances include winter and spring concerts, Choral fest Jazz, and the Brandon Jazz Festival. Students are selected in September by audition only. Vocal Jazz 30S is worth 1 credit and is a continuation of Vocal Jazz 20. Vocal Jazz 40S is worth 1 credit and is a continuation of Vocal Jazz 20G and 30S. The other two courses are Chamber Choir and Vocalease is an audition only group. These courses meet outside of classes to practice for performances. These groups give performances at school concerts as well as the Brandon Jazz Festival.

== Other offered programs ==
=== CIP ===
CIP (Career Internship Program) is a high-school-to-work transition program. Students involved with the program are offered on-the-job experience and classroom study to help them make the post grad transition. Although students are not paid for their work with cooperating employers, each student earns credit towards their high school diploma.

=== Peer Tutoring Program ===
The Peer Tutoring Program is a service "run by the students, for the students." Students with an average of 80% or higher in a course offer their talents by signing up for this program in hopes of helping other students meet their goals. This service is available to all grades for both tutoring and being tutored. Once a tutor and a tutee are matched up they simply choose a specific time to meet and then they are all ready to go. The program is monitored by the River East Collegiate resource teacher. Students who volunteer to be a tutor are awarded by the school at the end of the year.

== Sports ==
River East Collegiate has many teams at both the Junior Varsity and Varsity levels. They have male and female teams in Basketball, Volleyball, Soccer, Golf, Hockey and Indoor/Outdoor Track and Field and a male-only Football team. They compete in the Kildonan Peguis Athletic Conference (KPAC). The school football team won the first annual Peguis Bowl in 2007 when they defeated their rival Miles Macdonell Collegiate Buckeyes by a score of 28–0. The school has a tradition of athletic success and hundreds of KPAC championship banners hang in the gym (some dating back to the 1960s).

=== Varsity Football ===
River East had previously been in the first division (Potter Division) until 2009 when they moved down to the second division (Vidryk Division); where they made it to a semi-finals with only their second loss and a 7–2 final record with the coaching staff winning the Coaching Staff of the Year in their division. They moved back up to first division the next year later; but after only winning one game that year and losing in the first round of the play-offs they moved back down to the second Division and have remained there in the 2011 & 2012 seasons. In the 2012 season the Kodiaks finished 3rd, being eliminated in the semi-finals by the Kelvin Klippers. They played a good season with a final record of 6 and 3. In 2018 the Kodiaks had another great season finishing the regular season as the first ever Bramwell Conference Champions, and carrying their success into the playoffs to beat out the Kelvin Klippers 22–14 in the finals crowning them CTV Bowl Champions. First year Head Coach Sean Oleksewycz's team finished the season with a record of 9–1, and rings in hand.

=== Varsity Girls' Volleyball ===
River East varsity girls' volleyball team were provincial champions 4 times in a row from 1997 to 2000. This year the 2010-11 team was KPAC champions and beat Lord Selkirk in provincial finals.

=== Junior Varsity Girls' Basketball ===
River East Collegiate has a history of success in interscholastic athletics, one of them being basketball. The JV teams participate in KPAC, with the season starting in December, and ending in March. As well with these games, they participate in many tournaments. Throughout the years they have won many KPAC banners and they sometimes participate in the provincials.

In the past, the JV girls' basketball team have won the KPAC conference in these years (There were many back-to-back wins):

1970-71, 1973–74, 1974–75, 1975–76, 1977–78, 1978–79,
1979-80, 1984–85, 1998–99, 1999-00, 2001–02, 2002–03,
2003-04, 2007–08, 2008–09

=== Girls' hockey ===
The River east Kodiaks girls' hockey team runs from October till about March. They have a team of 11 players and 1 goalie.

=== Boys' hockey ===
During the 2025 season, the River East Kodiaks boys' hockey team is made up of 15- to 18-year-old boys. The team is made up of several grades – 10, 11 and also 12.

=== Girls' soccer ===
River East girls' soccer team has been very successful the last 15 years. The outdoor soccer team has won 9 out of the last 15 KPAC championships. They won in the 1995- 1996 school year, as well as 1997–1998, 2002–2003, 2003–2004, 2005–2006, 2007–2008, 2008–2009 and 2009–2010. The team also won the Manitoba Provincial Championships in 2005 beating Glenlawn in the Finals. The River East soccer team has girls from all 3 grades 10, 11 and 12. To make the team you to attend the open tryouts before the soccer season, they usually carry a roster anywhere from 14 -18 girls depending on numbers. Besides just outdoor soccer River East is one of the few schools in the KPAC division to field an indoor team as well.

=== Junior varsity football ===
The junior varsity (JV) league was first introduced in 2009 and was made for grade 9 and grade 10 players only. River East joined this league in 2009 and went on to win the championship that same year. The Kodiaks did not have a JV team in the 2010 league due to lack of grade 10 players and loss of coaching staff. The few grade 10 players in 2010 played with the varsity Kodiak football team. In 2011, they once again had enough enrolment to form a team and went on to win the Junior Varsity Division with a school record of 11–0 perfect season with the coaching staff winning the Coaching Staff of the Year in their division.

== Notable alumni ==
- Jamie Moses, politician and member of the Legislative Assembly of Manitoba
- Chad Posthumus, professional basketball player in the Canadian Elite Basketball League CEBL
- Matt Wiebe, politician and member of the Legislative Assembly of Manitoba
