= Shmuel Abba Twersky =

Ukrainian-Canadian rabbi

Grand Rabbi Shmuel Abba Twersky
- Title: Makarover Rebbe of Winnipeg, Canada

Personal life
- Born: Abba Avraham Shmuel Twersky; 1872 Ukraine
- Died: 1947 (aged 74–75) Winnipeg, Manitoba, Canada
- Buried: Shaarey Zedek Cemetery, Winnipeg
- Spouse: Rickel Twersky
- Children: 2
- Parents: Grand Rabbi Moshe Mordechai Twersky (father); Chavah Rokeach (mother)
- Dynasty: Makarov

Religious life
- Religion: Judaism

Jewish leader
- Began: 1927
- Ended: 1947
- Other: Makarover Rebbe of Berdichev, 1920–
- Yahrtzeit: 14 Sivan 5707
- Dynasty: Makarov

Abba Avraham Shmuel Twersky (1872–1947), (Note: Other sources place his birthdate as 1885 or 1888.) known as Shmuel Abba Twersky, was a rebbe of the Makarover Hasidic dynasty. He succeeded his father as Makarover rebbe of Berdichev, Ukraine, in 1920, and presided as Makarover rebbe of Winnipeg, Manitoba, Canada, from 1927 to 1947.

== Early life and family ==
Shmuel Abba Twersky was born to Grand Rabbi Moshe Mordechai Twersky (1844–1920), a direct descendant of the Chernobyl Hasidic dynasty, who was the Makarover rebbe of Berdichev and Kiev. His mother Chavah was a daughter of Yehoshua Rokeach, the second Belzer rebbe.

Shmuel Abba married his first cousin, Rickel Twersky, the daughter of his father's brother, David Twersky of Kiev. They had one son and one daughter. As a young married man, he was known for his proficiency in Torah study.

Upon his father's death in 1920, he and his brother Tzvi Aryeh (d. 1938) became Makarover rebbes in Berdichev. Later he briefly moved his court to Mezerich. In the wake of pogroms during the 1917–1921 Ukrainian War of Independence, he and his family fled to Riga, Latvia.

== Canada ==
The Makarover Hasidic community in Winnipeg, Manitoba, Canada, included numerous members who had immigrated there due to the Ukrainian pogroms. They invited Twersky to be their leader. Twersky's move was stalled by two years of bureaucratic red tape. Finally he was cleared for immigration and departed by ship from Cherbourg, France, in December 1927. According to an article in the local Yiddish newspaper, he was greeted at the Winnipeg train station by "several hundred Hasidim".

His community bought him a house on Flora Avenue, where a large number of Jewish immigrants resided. Later he moved to Boyd Avenue, where he opened a beth midrash in his house.

Twersky was a prominent leader of the Winnipeg Jewish community. However, he distanced himself from community discord and in-fighting.

== Personal life ==
Twersky's wife and two children joined him over two years after his arrival in Winnipeg. His wife died suddenly in February 1930 at the age of 54. Twersky's son Yitzchak Yaakov became principal of a Talmud Torah in Halifax, Nova Scotia; Twersky also had a daughter, Tzipporah.

Twersky died on 2 June 1947 (14 Sivan 5707). He was buried in an ohel in the Shaarey Zedek Cemetery in Winnipeg beside his wife. Many people came to pray at his ohel in the years after his death.

== Sources ==
- Jewish Historical Society of Western Canada (1983). Jewish Life and Times. Vol. IX. Jewish Historical Society of Western Canada. ISBN 9780969125686.
- Lapidus, Steve (2004). "The Forgotten Hasidim: Rabbis and Rebbes in Prewar Canada". Canadian Jewish Studies. 12.
- Levine, Alan (2009). Coming of Age: A History of the Jewish People of Manitoba. Heartland Associates. ISBN 978-1896150529.
