= Emerson Elementary School =

Emerson Elementary School may refer to:

- Emerson Elementary School (Oakland, California)
- Emerson Elementary School (Winnipeg, Manitoba)
- Emerson Elementary School (Tulsa, Oklahoma)
