= Shaarey Zedek Cemetery (Winnipeg) =

Jewish cemetery in Manitoba, Canada

- בית החיים של שערי צדק
- Interactive map of Shaarey Zedek Cemetery

Details
- Established: 1894
- Location: 230 Armstrong Avenue, Winnipeg
- Country: Canada
- Coordinates: 49°56′44″N 97°06′54″W
- Owned by: Shaarey Zedek Synagogue
- Size: 4 hectares (9.9 acres)
- Website: www.shaareyzedek.mb.ca/funeral_and_cemetery/funerals_and_cemetery.htm
- Find a Grave: Shaarey Zedek Cemetery

Shaarey Zedek Cemetery is a Conservative Jewish burial ground in the North End of Winnipeg, Manitoba, Canada. Operated by the Shaarey Zedek Synagogue, it is the largest Jewish cemetery in the Canadian Prairies, with more than 8,000 graves as of 1996. In 2012, a Jewish interfaith burial ground was installed in a fenced-off section with a separate entrance to accommodate interment of Jews alongside their non-Jewish spouses. The cemetery features a war memorial honouring Winnipeg residents who fell in World War I and World War II.

== History ==
Shaarey Zedek Synagogue, the oldest Jewish synagogue in Winnipeg, was built in the late 1880s and dedicated in March 1890. A synagogue committee arranged for the purchase of 4 hectares (9.9 acres) of land in the West Kildonan area of the city for the establishment of a cemetery; the Shaarey Zedek Cemetery was dedicated in 1894. The first burial took place that same year. Shaarey Zedek Cemetery was the second Jewish burial ground to be established in the province of Manitoba, the first being the Children of Israel Cemetery established in Transcona, Winnipeg, in 1883. As the latter cemetery was prone to flooding, it was closed in the early 1930s in preference to burials at Shaarey Zedek Cemetery.

== Description ==
Shaarey Zedek Cemetery is the largest Jewish cemetery in the Canadian Prairies. In 1996 the cemetery contained more than 8,000 graves. There are two ohelim (mausoleums) on the grounds, erected in 1917 and 1947, which house the remains of important local rabbis. One contains the graves of Rabbi Shmuel Abba Twersky, the Makarover Rebbe of Winnipeg, and his rebbetzin; the other is the burial site of Rabbi Schulim Gruber, a Torah scholar from Eastern Europe who taught cheder classes in his Winnipeg home. The cemetery also has unmarked plots for the burial of genizah.

Most but not all graves have headstones. In keeping with Jewish tradition, the graves are positioned in rows that run on a north–south axis, so that the front of all graves faces east, toward Jerusalem. Wives are always buried to the right of their husbands.

According to the Commonwealth War Graves Commission, the cemetery includes three Commonwealth war graves from World War I, and four from World War II.

A large family plot reserved for the Bronfman family, of which Samuel Bronfman was the most prominent member, being president of the Canadian Jewish Congress from 1939 to 1962, contains only three graves. These belong to Samuel's parents, Ekiel (Yechiel) and Minnie (Mindel) Bronfman, and his baby sister, Minette.

A fifteen-year project to create a photographic record of every Jewish gravestone in Manitoba, and input information from the stones into a database, began in 1996 under the auspices of the Jewish Heritage Centre of Western Canada. Shaarey Zedek Cemetery was one of the province's nine Jewish cemeteries included in this project.

=== War memorial ===
A stele cenotaph honoring local Jewish residents who were killed in World War I and World War II was unveiled in the cemetery on September 11, 1949. It was placed by the General Monash branch No. 115 of the Canadian Legion, with the participation of the Canadian Jewish Congress. The cenotaph is engraved with the names of eight Winnipeg Jewish servicemen who fell in World War I and 68 Winnipeg Jewish servicemen who fell in World War II. The opening inscription reads: "TO THE HALLOWED MEMORY OF OUR COMRADES WHO OFFERED THE SACRIFICE SUPREME". A short passage from Psalm 23 appears at the bottom of the cenotaph.

=== Interfaith burial ground ===
In January 2012, an interfaith burial ground was opened in the northwest portion of the cemetery. Called the Shaarey Shamayim Cemetery, it is separated from the main cemetery by a roadway and circumscribed by a wrought-iron fence nearly 2 m (6 ft 7 in) in height. It also has a separate entrance. The interfaith cemetery was opened in response to the high intermarriage rate in the city; at the time, an estimated 70% of Jews were marrying a non-Jewish spouse. The 203-plot cemetery provides a traditional Jewish burial for Jews even as they are buried alongside their non-Jewish partner.

== Notable events ==
In November 1918, a black wedding (Yiddish: shvartze chasunah) was held in the cemetery during the Spanish flu pandemic. This ancient Jewish tradition, invoked in times of plague, involved community members coming together to marry off a poor, orphaned bride and groom and provide for their new home, in the hope of eliciting heavenly mercy to stop the plague. The chuppah (marriage canopy) was erected at one end of the Shaarey Zedek Cemetery, while at the other end a funeral was taking place. The officiating rabbis, Rabbi Israel Isaac Kahanovitch and Rabbi I. D. Gorodsky, spoke about the pandemic and prayed to God for salvation. An estimated 1,000 people, both Jewish and non-Jewish, attended the ceremony.

In 1931, the cemetery was part of a solemn parade route on Decoration Day, which included the laying of wreaths at each of the city's burial grounds. Rabbi Solomon Frank of Shaarey Zedek Synagogue recited the "El Malei Rachamim" memorial prayer, while members of the local B'nai Brith Lodge laid a wreath. Members of the Canadian Legion also participated in this memorial service.

The cemetery was vandalized twice in the 20th century. In a 1968 attack, 108 headstones were damaged. On the eve of the anniversary of Kristallnacht in November 1993, 78 headstones were wrecked, with damages estimated at $50,000. According to the police hate-crimes unit, no overt signs of antisemitism were seen in the latter attack.

== Notable burials ==
- Izzy Asper, Canadian Jewish lawyer and media mogul
- Isaac Benjamin Dembinsky, Mayor of The Pas
- Rabbi Israel Isaac Kahanovitch, Chief Rabbi of Winnipeg and Western Canada
- Louis Slotin, Canadian physicist and member of the Manhattan Project
- Harry Trager, Mayor of The Pas
- Rabbi Shmuel Abba Twersky, Makarover Rebbe of Winnipeg

== Sources ==
- deGroot, Scott F. (1983), "Inscribed in Stone: A preliminary investigation into the history, built structures, and landscapes of Jewish cemeteries in Manitoba", Jewish Life and Times, vol. IX, Jewish Historical Society of Western Canada, ISBN 978-0-969-12568-6
- Jones, Esyllt W. (2007). Influenza 1918: Disease, Death, and Struggle in Winnipeg. University of Toronto Press. ISBN 978-1-442-69141-4.
- Maddin, Guy (2009). My Winnipeg. Coach House Books. ISBN 978-1-552-45211-0.
- Swyripa, Frances (2010). Storied Landscapes: Ethno-religious Identity and the Canadian Prairies. University of Manitoba Press. ISBN 978-0-887-55720-0.
