= Children of Israel Cemetery =

Jewish cemetery in Winnipeg, Canada

- Interactive map of Children of Israel Cemetery

Details
- Established: 1883
- Closed: 1935
- Location: 484 Almey Street, Transcona, Winnipeg
- Country: Canada
- Coordinates: 49°54′02″N 97°03′19″W
- Owned by: Shaarey Zedek Synagogue
- No. of graves: 113

Children of Israel Cemetery is a Jewish cemetery in the Transcona suburb of Winnipeg, Manitoba, Canada. It operated from 1883 to 1933. The cemetery reached a total of 113 graves before it was closed due to frequent flooding. After decades of vandalism and the toppling of headstones due to the elements, Shaarey Zedek Synagogue of Winnipeg negotiated the legal transfer of the burial ground to their management in 1957. The cemetery was then enclosed by a high chain-link fence, and the headstones were laid flat to the ground and embedded in concrete to prevent further damage. The synagogue allows access to the cemetery to those who wish to visit the graves of their family members.

== History ==
Founded in 1883, Children of Israel Cemetery was the first Jewish burial ground in Western Canada. A year before, a group of about 260 Austrian Galician Jewish refugees had emigrated to Winnipeg, joining the 100 Jewish residents who had settled in the city between 1878 and 1880. Due to the sudden influx of a group more than twice their size, the local community was unable to meet the newcomers' needs for food and support, and the refugees were housed in immigration sheds by the government. While about 150 of the men were able to find employment laying track on the Canadian Pacific Railway, they lost their jobs in the 1882 recession. Over the winter, five of their infants died of malnutrition and exposure. They were buried on a plot of land on Thomas Street provided by Winnipeg Jewish community member David Ripstein. The refugees were dissatisfied with the location of the burial ground, however, and with the help of Ripstein and Simon Lechtzier, a fund-raising campaign was launched in the Winnipeg Jewish community which raised $300 for the purchase of a tract in Transcona for a permanent cemetery.

At the time, Transcona was outside the city limits, so it was seen as an ideal location to "allow for the living to be separated from the dead". In June 1883, the remains of the five infants were transferred to the newly dedicated cemetery, which continued to be used for burials over the next five decades.

The last burial in the cemetery took place on June 20, 1933. (Note: A signpost at the entrance indicates the dates of operation of the cemetery as 1833 to 1935.) The cemetery was closed due to frequent flooding, after which Shaarey Zedek Cemetery, located in the North End, became the main Jewish burial ground in the city.

== Vandalism and repairs ==
In May 1933, a man visiting the graves of his parents discovered extensive vandalism to the Children of Israel Cemetery. More than 70 headstones had been damaged and toppled, many broken by a sledgehammer. The doors and floor tiles of a small building on the premises had been removed and the prayer shawls and prayer books that had been stored inside were strewn about. Investigators determined that the vandalism had taken place on and off over the previous fall and winter, with damages estimated at $3,000. The local Anti-Defamation League of B'nai B'rith offered a $200 reward for the arrest of the perpetrators.

In 1957, following the vandalism of more headstones as well as the collapse of many stones due to the elements, administrators from Shaarey Zedek Synagogue, which also operates the Shaarey Zedek Cemetery, met with seven descendants of families buried in the Children of Israel Cemetery to negotiate the legal transfer of the burial ground to their management. The descendants sold the cemetery's $2,100 in assets to the synagogue for $1, enabling the synagogue to institute much-needed repairs. Among these were the installation of a high, iron, chain-link fence to enclose the property, and the decision to lay all the headstones flat on the ground and embed them in concrete, thus minimizing vandalism and preventing more stones from falling down.

Owing to its location in a wooded area, the cemetery is also threatened by the encroachment of branches from poplar trees and bushes; the groundskeeping crew works to keep this overgrowth at bay. According to a 2014 internal committee report, Congregation Shaarey Zedek's expenditures on behalf of the Children of Israel Cemetery are presently limited to "mowing the grass". A caretaker will escort visitors into the cemetery to visit the graves of their family members.

== Description ==
The Children of Israel Cemetery is in a heavily wooded section of the Winnipeg suburb of Transcona. Despite its secluded location, the surrounding area has undergone significant commercial and residential development. The burial ground is now located within walking distance of the Kildonan Place shopping mall, and a 340,000 sq ft (32,000 m^{2}) Shops of Kildonan Mile has been slated for development nearby. However, the cemetery is still difficult to access due to surrounding brush. The groundskeeping crew has an easement to reach the cemetery through private residential property to undertake its regular maintenance rounds.

The cemetery is circumscribed by a 12 ft-high (3.7 m) chain-link fence with a lock. In keeping with Jewish tradition, the graves are arranged in rows on a north–south axis, so that the front of each grave faces east, toward Jerusalem. There are approximately 113 graves. The language on the gravestones is predominantly English, with some Hebrew and Romanian inscriptions seen. The inscriptions reveal that more than 70 percent of the burials took place before 1918. The ages of the deceased range from ten days to 83 years.

The gravestones, while not ornate, reflect Eastern European Jewish funereal art. Most of the stones are crafted from granite or limestone, with some from marble. In some parts of the burial ground, there are depressions in the earth without the presence of a gravestone. These depressions could indicate the earlier presence of an ohel, a wooden structure placed over a grave, which was common in Eastern Europe. A wooden marker that had been affixed to an ohel was retrieved from the cemetery in 1957 and stored in the archives of the Jewish Historical Society.

A fifteen-year project to create a photographic record of every Jewish gravestone in Manitoba, as well as a database recording the information on the stones, began in 1996 under the auspices of the Genealogical Institute of the Jewish Heritage Centre of Western Canada. Children of Israel Cemetery was one of the province's nine Jewish cemeteries included in this project.

== Sources ==
- deGroot, Scott F. (1983), "Inscribed in Stone: A preliminary investigation into the history, built structures, and landscapes of Jewish cemeteries in Manitoba", Jewish Life and Times: A Collection of Essays, vol. IX, Jewish Historical Society of Western Canada, ISBN 978-0-969-12568-6
