= Shaare Zedek =

Shaare Zedek (Hebrew: שַׁעֲרֵי צֶדֶק "Gates of Righteousness"), also spelled Shaarei/Shaaray/Shaarey, Sedek/Tsedec/Tsedek/Tzedec/Tzedek, may refer to:

== Canada ==
- Congregation Shaarey Zedek, an Orthodox synagogue in Windsor, Ontario
- Shaare Zedek Congregation, a Conservative synagogue in Montreal
- Shaarei Tzedec, an Orthodox synagogue in Toronto
- Shaarey Zedek Synagogue, a Conservative synagogue in Winnipeg
  - Shaarey Zedek Cemetery, a Jewish cemetery in Winnipeg

== Colombia ==
- Sinagoga Shaare Sedek, an Orthodox synagogue in Barranquilla

== Israel ==
- Shaare Zedek Medical Center, a major hospital in Jerusalem
- Shaare Zedek Cemetery, a small Jewish cemetery in Jerusalem

== United Kingdom ==
- Sha'arei Tsedek North London Reform Synagogue, a synagogue in London

== United States ==
- Congregation Shaare Zedek, a Conservative Jewish synagogue in Manhattan
  - Congregation Shaare Zedek Cemetery, a Jewish cemetery in Manhattan
- Congregation Shaarey Zedek, a Conservative Jewish synagogue in Southfield, Michigan
- Shaare Zedek Synagogue, a former synagogue in St. Louis, Missouri
- Shaari Zedek Synagogue, a historic former synagogue in Brooklyn, New York
