= Bernie Wolfe =

Bernie Wolfe may refer to:

- Bernie Wolfe (ice hockey) (born 1951), retired Canadian National Hockey League goaltender
- Bernie Wolfe (Holby City), a fictional character from the medical drama Holby City
- Bernie Wolfe Community School a school in the River East Transcona school division in Winnipeg, Manitoba
