= Transcona =

Suburb of Winnipeg

Coordinates: 49°53′44″N 97°00′19″W

- Suburb
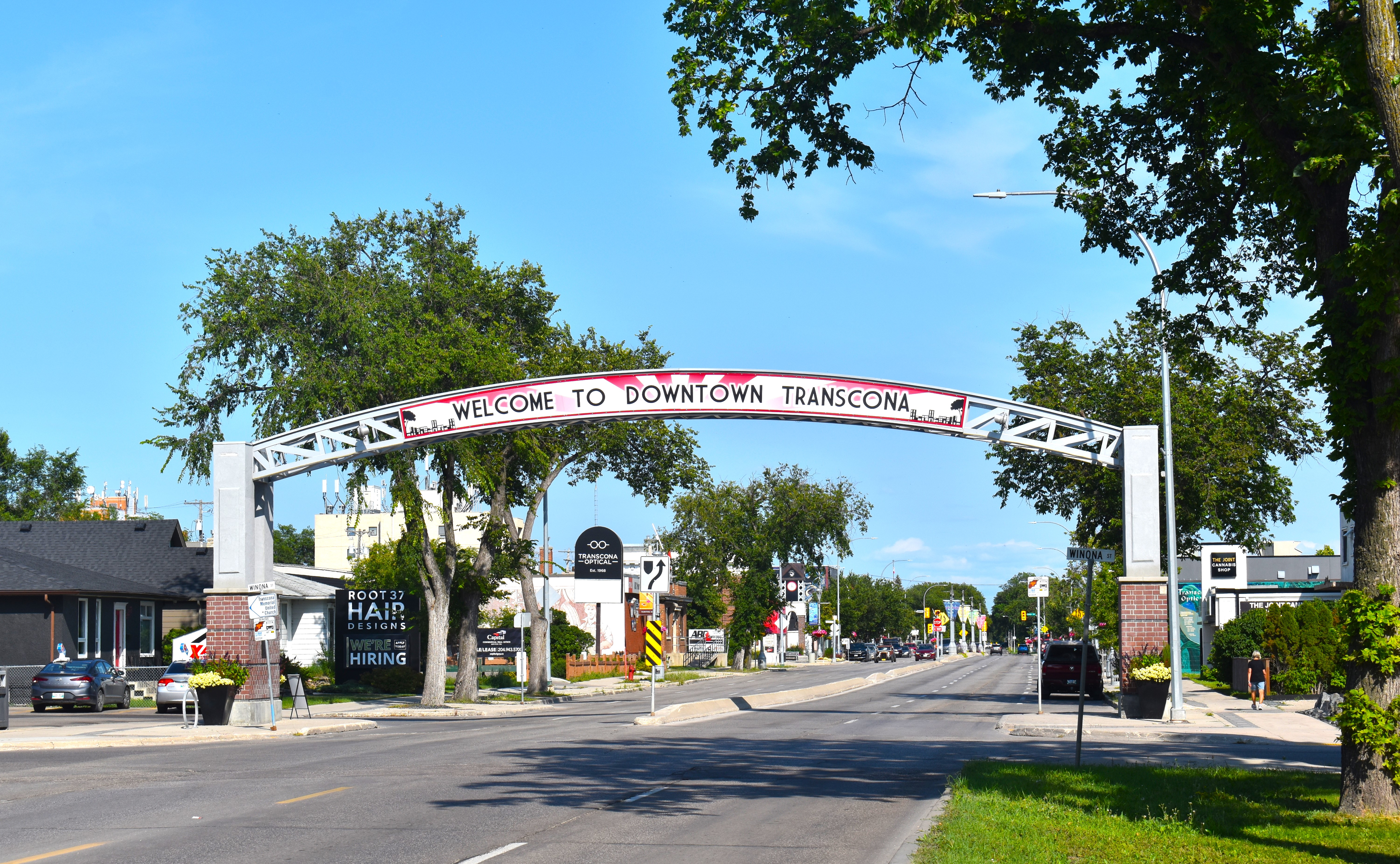
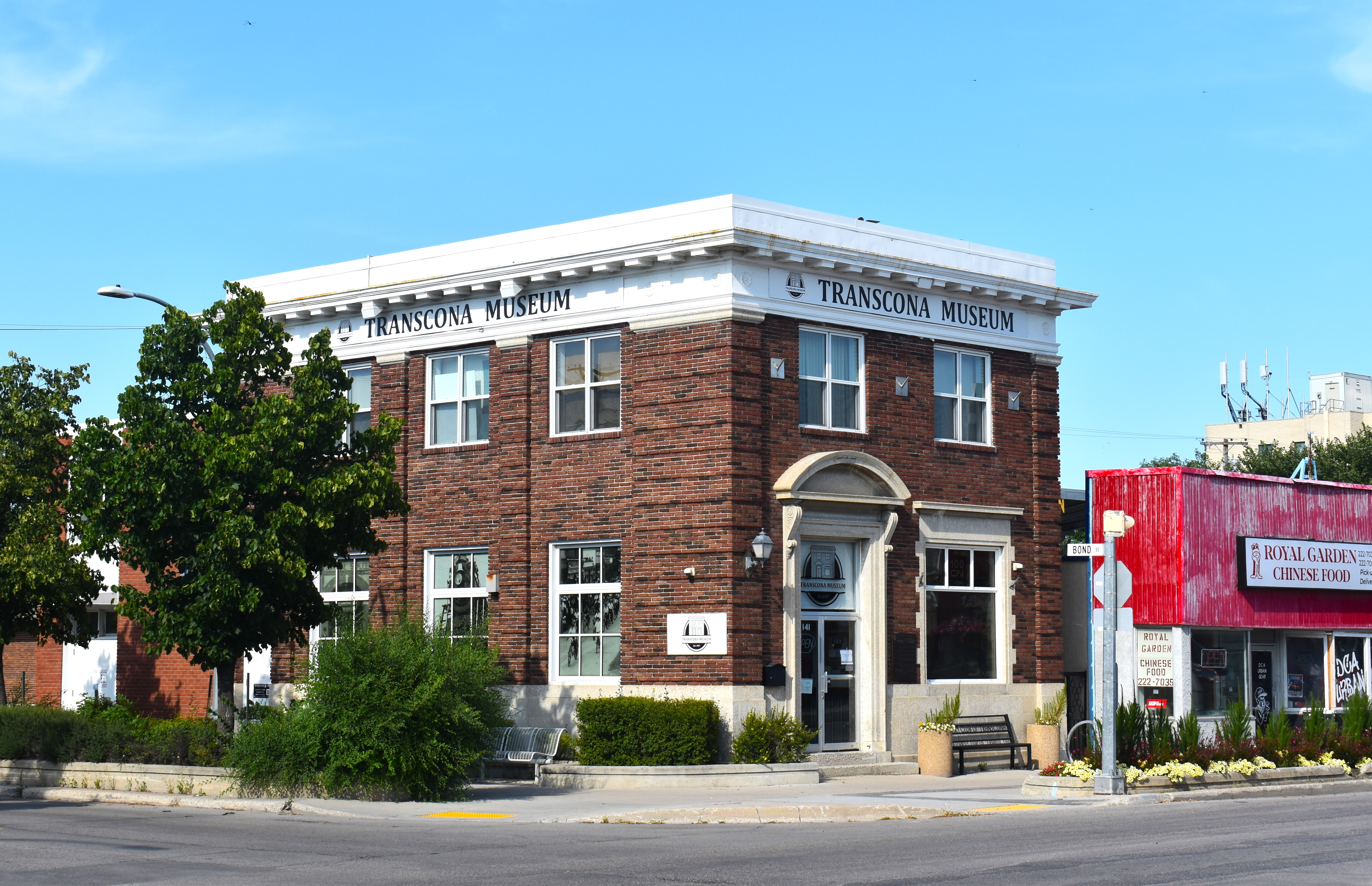
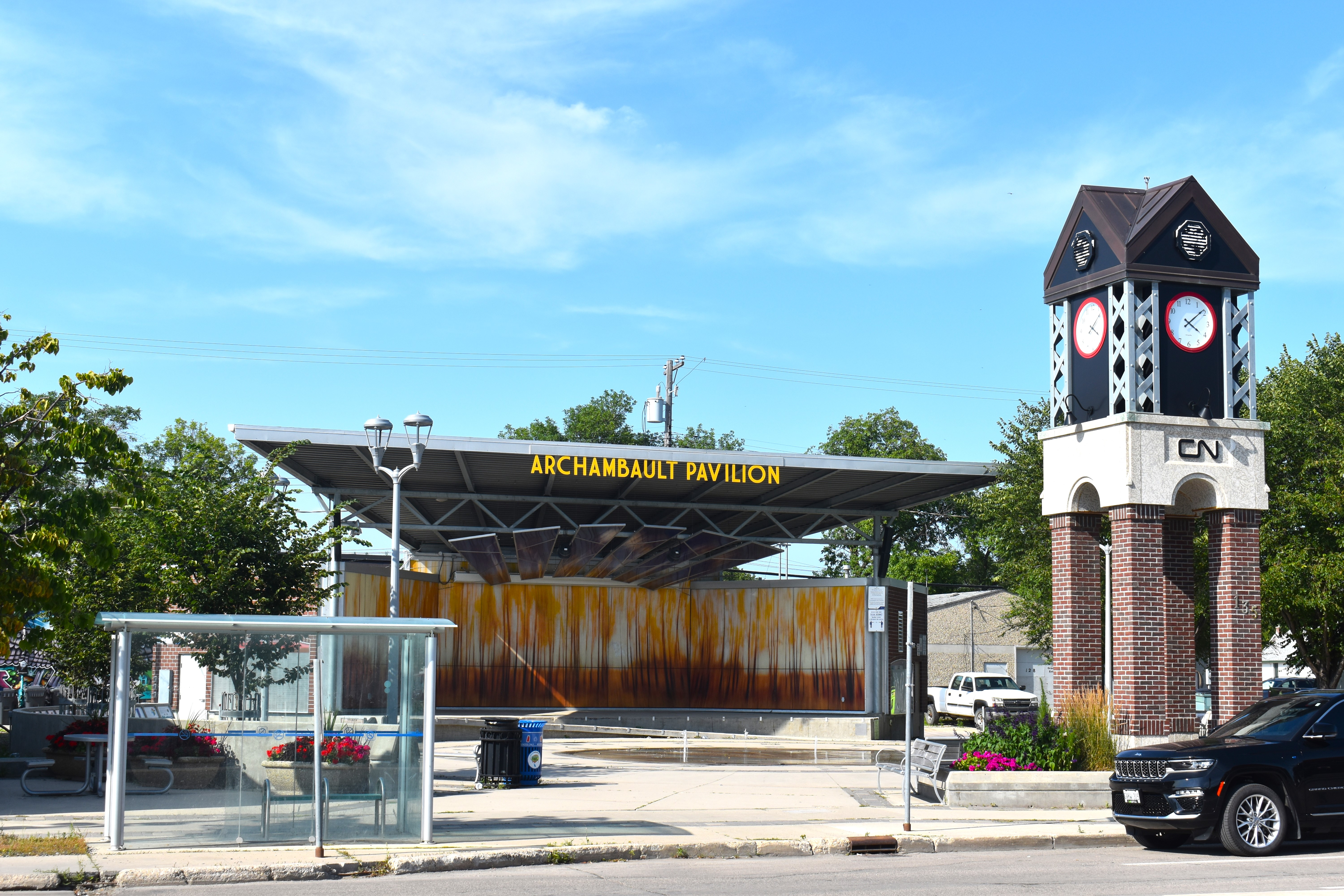
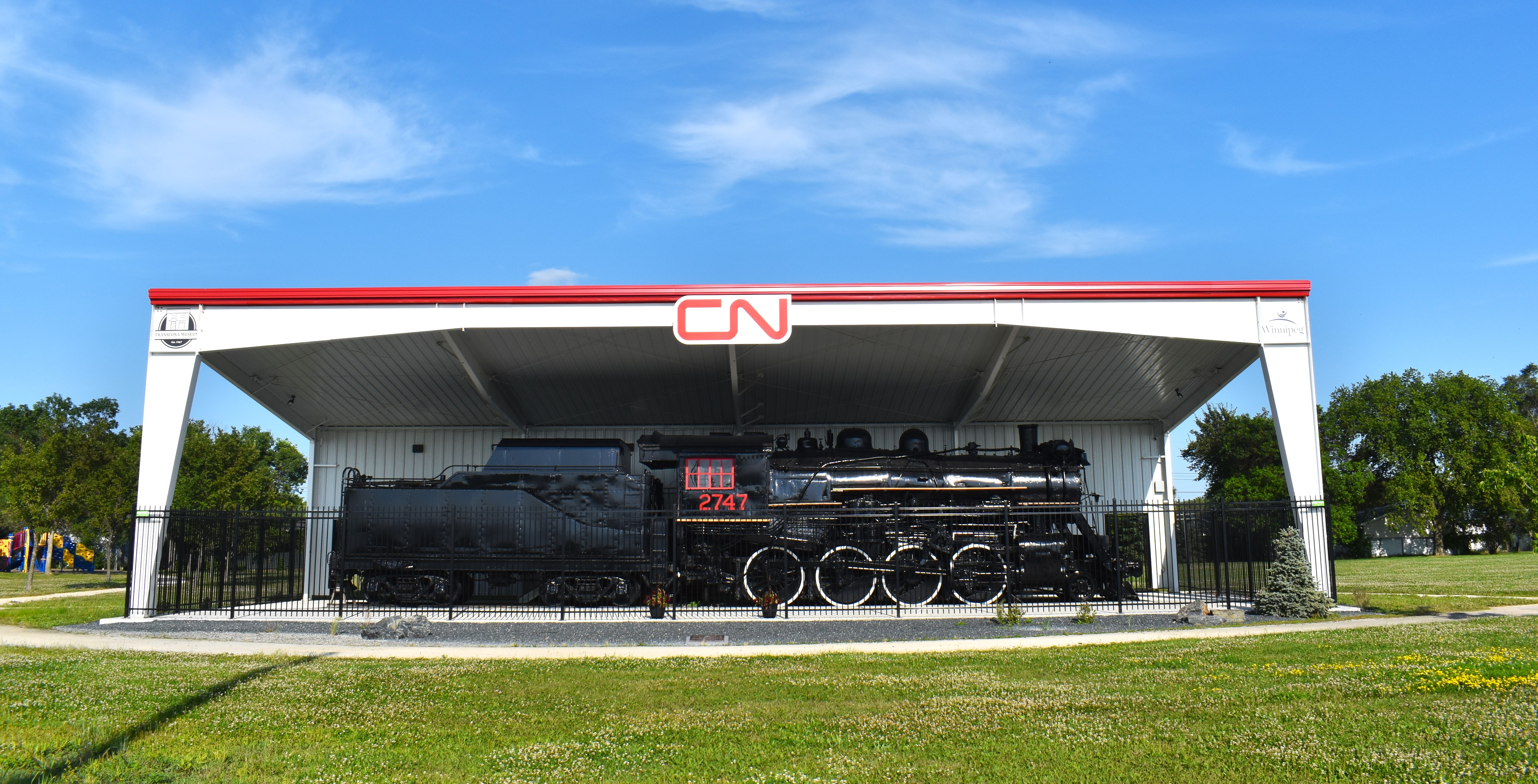
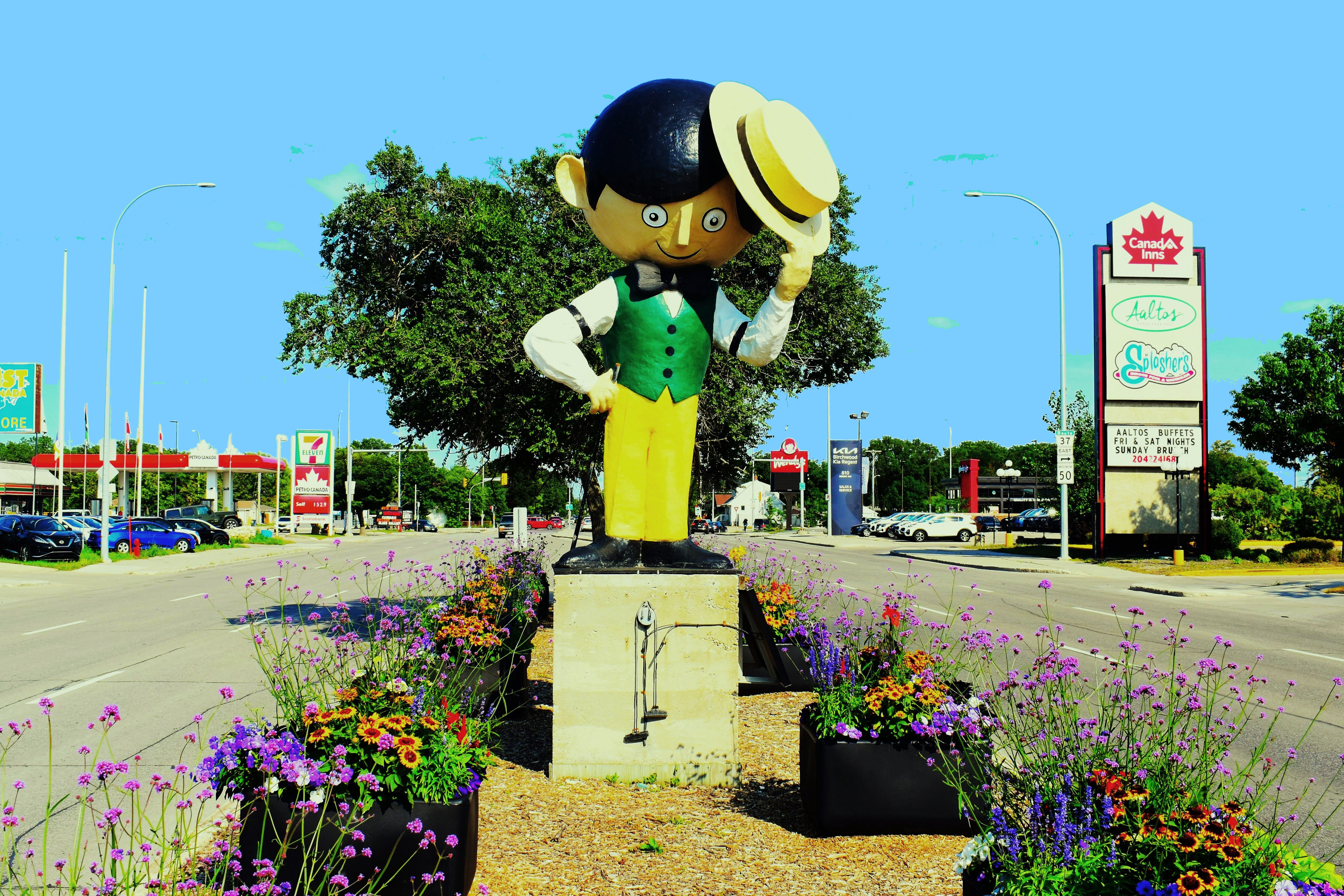
- Nickname: Park City
- Interactive map of Transcona
- Country: Canada
- Province: Manitoba
- City: Winnipeg
- Incorporated (town): April 6, 1912
- Incorporated (city): 1961
- Named for: National Transcontinental Railway and Lord Strathcona

Government
  - MP: Colin Reynolds
  - MLA: Shannon Corbett (Transcona); Jelynn Dela Cruz (Radisson)
  - Councillor: Lora Meseman

Area
  - Suburb: 28.8 km^{2} (11.1 sq mi)
  - Land: 20.8 km^{2} (8.0 sq mi)
  - Metro: 5,306.79 km^{2} (2,048.96 sq mi)
- Elevation: 232 m (761 ft)

Population (2021)
  - Suburb: 43,025
  - Density: 2,070/km^{2} (5,360/sq mi)
- Demonym: Transconan
- Time zone: UTC-6
  - Summer (DST): UTC-5
- Postal code: R2C
- Area codes: 204, 431

Transcona is a ward and suburb of Winnipeg, Manitoba, located about 10 kilometres (6.2 mi) east of the downtown area.

Until 1972, it was a separate municipality, having been incorporated first as the Town of Transcona on 6 April 1912 and then as the City of Transcona in 1961. The first Council for the Town of Transcona met in 1912 and the first Council for the City of Transcona met on 19 June 1961.

Today, the ward is represented by a member of Winnipeg City Council, and the suburb is part of the Transcona neighbourhood cluster—composed of much larger boundaries including large areas that were part of the Municipality of North Kildonan, and much of the area west of Plessis. It is primarily a working-class residential area with some light industry.

== History ==
Beginning in 1835, the area now known as Transcona was administered by the Council of Assiniboia until 1870, when the Province of Manitoba was created and took jurisdiction over the area, after which they began the process of municipal incorporation.

The community of Transcona came about in 1908 when the Grand Trunk Pacific (GTP) and National Transcontinental Railway (NTR), looking to build a second railway line across Canada, settled on a large area of unoccupied, flat land east of Winnipeg. This land functioned as the centrally located site for repair and maintenance of the GTP and NTR railways. (Built in 1926, CNR Steam Locomotive #2747 (CNR 2747), a steam-powered railway locomotive in Rotary Heritage Park on Plessis Road, was the first of 33 engines to be built completely at the Transcona Shops and the first engine to be built in Western Canada.)

The land was also intended to be a townsite, so that municipal services could be provided to workers who came for prospective employment for the railway. The name Transcona derived from combining Transcontinental with Strathcona, the name of Lord Strathcona, Donald Smith, a former Manitoban who was instrumental in building the Canadian Pacific Railway not too long before.

In 1910, the Transcona post office opened and the area's population was reported at 1,600 people. The community at the time included two boarding houses, a bakery, butcher shop, a bank, two churches (Methodist and Presbyterian), and a two-room school in the Saunders Block. A year later, on 10 February, the Transcona Board of Trade was inaugurated.

Soon after, on 6 April 1912, the Town of Transcona was officially incorporated. The first Transcona election was held on Monday, 20 May 1912, resulting in Colin J. E. Maxwell as mayor. Six town councillors were also elected: Peter Watt, J. W. Gunn, C. Fieldhouse, Alex Campbell, Ovide Brodeur, and Matt Hall. The first town council met later that year.

During World War I, between 1914 and 1918, more than 400 men from Transcona enlisted in service to their country and the Crown; and the Transcona Shell Company and Eley Cartridge Company manufactured munitions. With the town declaring bankruptcy in 1921, the mayor and council were required to resign, and administration over Transcona was handed to the Manitoba government from that year until 1928, after a Town Council was elected in 1927. During the Second World War, from 1939 to 1945, over 800 men and women from Transcona served in uniform, while others worked at the Cordite Plant, on the armoured train, or helped with the Transcona War Efforts Committee.

By 1955, Transcona had a population of 8,000, which grew to 13,000 by 1961. That year, the municipality gained a city charter and became the City of Transcona, whose first council 19 June 1961, with T. F. Copeland as mayor. On 3 October 1966, "The Park City" was officially adopted as the official slogan through a motion passed by Mayor Harry Fuller and Alderman C.J. Perry, Paul E. Martin, William Dzyndra, and M. Sharpe.

Map showing the former boundaries of the City of Transcona.

In 1972, the City of Transcona and several other municipalities merged with Winnipeg as part of the Unicity project laid out in the 1971 City of Winnipeg Act, whereupon it became a ward of the city and moved to first-past-the-post voting. At the time of its amalgamation into Winnipeg, the mayor was Harry Fuller and its final councillors were D. E. Perry, Walter Phillip, George E. Marshall, Charles J. Perry, William Dryden, and Albert J. Thompson.

Today, the Canadian National Railway is still a major employer in the community. CNR 2747 is now on display at the corner of Plessis Road and Kildare Avenue in the Kiwanis Park courtesy of the Winnipeg Railway Museum.

=== Timeline ===
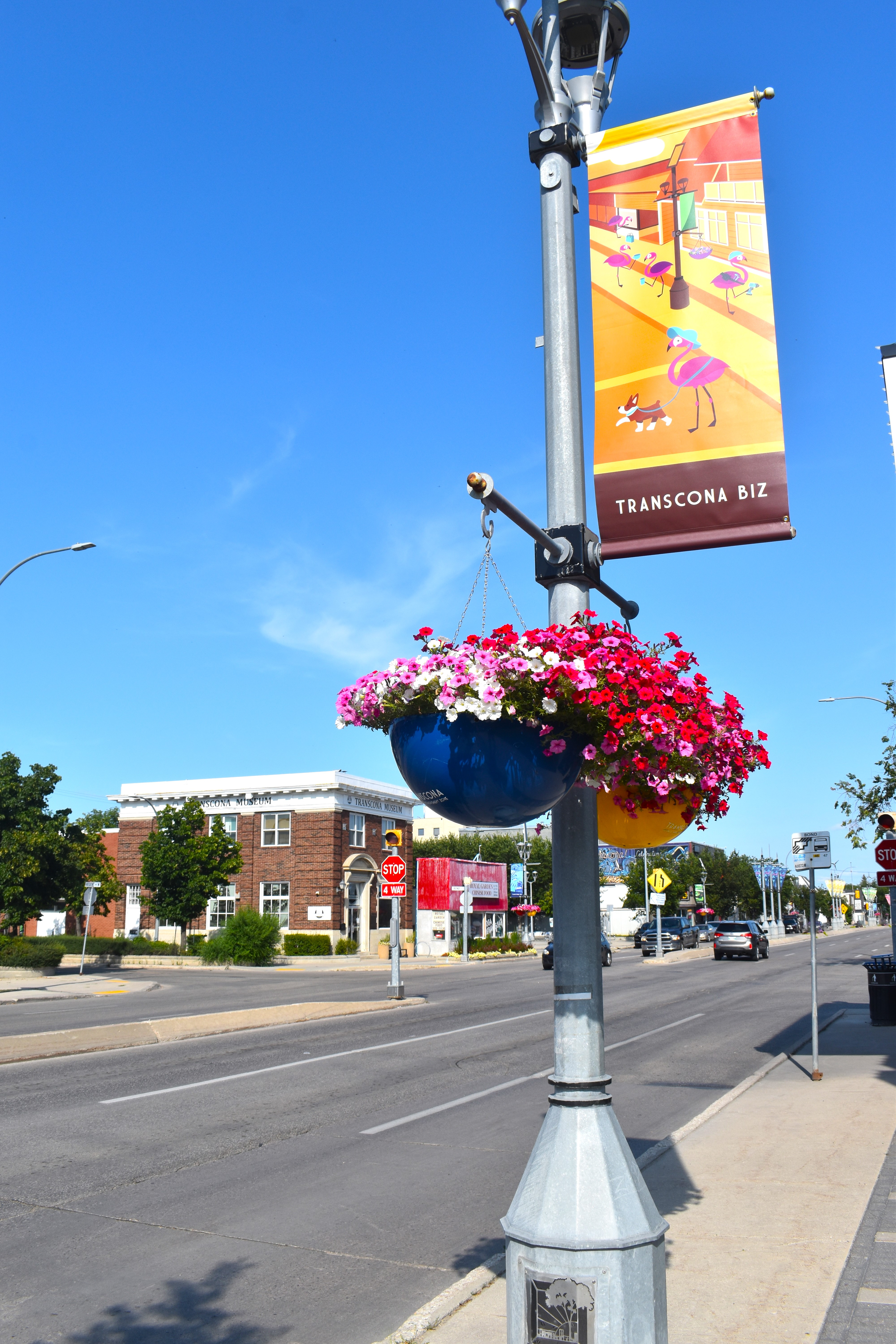
Transcona Biz banners in downtown Transcona.

1907 – Canadian Pacific builds additional railway tracks near district in the Municipality of Kildonan (CPR)

1908 – Grand Trunk Pacific (GTP) decides on Transcona as location for railway shops and buys 800 acres (3.2 km^{2}) of land. Name of Transcona adopted for future town. Townsite was originally to be created in what is now the South Transcona area, but this area was low-lying and subject to flooding and so the main townsite was moved north of the shops.

1909 – Haney, Quinlan and Robertson start work on excavation for the foundation of the new shops

1910 (January 1) – first steel pillar is raised in the new shop building, and the post office opened

1911 (February 10) – first Board of Trade is organized.

1912 (April 6) – Town of Transcona receives its charter, and on November 12 municipal offices and Fire Hall opened for Public Inspection. The first electric light and power installed from Pointe du Bois generating station of Winnipeg Hydro. Central School officially opened but classes do not begin until 1913.

1913 (January 18) – Transcona Shops opened, on April 10 the Transcona mayor presented Morley Donaldson, vice-president of GTP, with golden key as memento of shop opening. CPR builds grain elevator and opens yards near Transcona in the Municipality of Springfield and the Municipality of Kildonan. In October, the grain elevator tilts due to failure of its foundations, becoming a textbook example of the importance of soil mechanics. It is later restored.

1914 – Sewage system installed

1915–1918 – Transcona Shops manufacture munitions for the war; apparently part of the machine shop was converted to a shell shop.

1919 – Shoal Lake water connection for Town. Transcona athletic organization

1919 – Biggest sports field in Transcona's history held

1921 – Having run out of money, the town council dissolves, and the town is run until 1928 by provincially appointed administrators

1926 – First locomotive built in CNR shops

1929 – New post office built

1930 – Transcona Horticultural Society organized

1933 – Effects of the Great Depression hit Transcona. At the peak the town is paying the rent for 192 families.

1942 – HMCS Transcona is commissioned, aBangor-class minesweeper named for the town. The vessel participates in anti-submarine combat in the North Atlantic in December 1944.

1950 – The Red River floods. Some Winnipeg residents are temporarily sheltered in Transcona churches.

1961 – Becomes City of Transcona

1972 – Amalgamated with the City of Winnipeg along with 11 other communities

=== Former reeves and mayors ===
Prior to its amalgamation into Winnipeg in 1972, Transcona was led by a reeve or mayor.

Term	Reeve/mayor
1912–13	Colin John Edward Maxwell (1878–?)
1913–14	Peter Watt
1915	Ernest Hector Bate (c. 1886–1951)
1916	Peter Watt
1917–18	George C. Jones
1919–20	David Henry Brewster (1882–1953)
1921	Alexander R. Lyon
1922–27	George P. Campbell (Administrator)
1928	James Williamson
1929–31	William Haigh
1932	Evelyn Foster Shannon (1896–1973)
1933	George Edward Olive (1887–1973)
1934–37	Evelyn Foster Shannon
1938–45	George Edward Olive
1946–49	Andrew Russell "Russ" Paulley (1909–1984)
1950–51	R. G. Matheson
1952–53	Andrew Russell Paulley
1954–57	J. S. Johnston
1958–59	Paul Emile Martin (1920–2016)
1960–61	Thomas F. Copeland (1925–1998)
1962–71	Harry Fuller

== Places and government ==
Transcona is part of the Elmwood—Transcona federal electoral district. In the Manitoba Legislature, Transcona falls in parts of two constituencies; the representatives are Jelynn Dela Cruz and Shannon Corbett of the New Democratic Party of Manitoba.

Among its attractions, Transcona is home to the Transcona Historical Museum, the only designated historic building in the neighbourhood; Kildonan Place, the city's third largest mall; Kilcona Park; and Club Regent Casino.

=== Neighbourhoods ===
The city ward of Transcona includes the neighbourhoods of Melrose, Victoria West, Kern Park, Radisson, Kildare-Redonda, Canterbury Park, Meadows, Mission Gardens, Peguis, Grassie, Transcona South, Griffin, North Transcona Yards, Transcona Yards, Regent, Transcona North, Dugald, St. Boniface Industrial Park, Symington Yards, and Southland Park.

Though the majority of the area consists of houses built several decades ago, there are newer developments located in the east and northwest sections of the community including Canterbury Park, Lakeside Meadows, and Mission Gardens. Transcona's future expansion is limited by the presence of the Red River Floodway and the Perimeter Highway.

== Education and demographics ==
Federal census population history of Transcona
Year	Pop.	±%
1916	3,356	—
1921	4,185	+24.7%
1926	5,218	+24.7%
1931	5,747	+10.1%
1936	5,578	−2.9%
1941	5,495	−1.5%
1946	6,132	+11.6%
1951	6,752	+10.1%
1956	8,312	+23.1%
1961	14,248	+71.4%
1966	19,761	+38.7%
1971	22,490	+13.8%
1976	24,810	+10.3%
1981	26,015	+4.9%
1986	27,955	+7.5%
1991	30,695	+9.8%
1996	30,895	+0.7%
2001	30,255	−2.1%
2006	30,745	+1.6%
2011	33,350	+8.5%
2016	36,285	+8.8%
2021	43,025	+18.6%
Source: Statistics Canada

As of the 2016 census, the Transcona neighbourhood cluster was home to 36,285 people.

In 1959, the Transcona-Springfield School Division was created, supported jointly by the Town of Transcona and the Rural Municipality of Springfield for high school education only, and administered by a school board of nine officials. The Transcona School District No. 39 remained for elementary and junior high students. The School Division and Transcona School District merged in 1967. In 2002, the Transcona part of the former Transcona-Springfield School Division and the River East School Division were united as the River East Transcona School Division.

=== Elementary schools ===
- Bernie Wolfe Community School
- Ecole Centrale
- Ecole Margaret-Underhill
- Harold Hatcher Elementary School
- Joseph Teres School
- Radisson School
- Wayoata Elementary School
- Westview Elementary School
- St. Joseph The Worker School

=== Middle schools ===
- Arthur Day Middle School
- Bernie Wolfe Community School
- Ecole Regent Park School
- John W. Gunn Middle School

=== High schools ===
- Transcona Collegiate Institute (TCI)
- Murdoch MacKay Collegiate
- Collège Pierre-Elliott-Trudeau

=== French-immersion schools ===
- Collège Pierre-Elliott-Trudeau
- École Regent Park School
- École Centrale
- École Margaret-Underhill

== Notable people ==
The neighbourhood has produced several celebrities, including sports commentator Rod Black, former MuchMusic on-air personality Bradford How, Canadian athlete and cancer research activist Terry Fox, professional wrestler Kenny Omega, Olympic speed skater Susan Auch, and librarian Lorna Toolis.

In 2005, following in the style of CBC's The Greatest Canadian series, the Transcona Historical Museum sponsored their own local version called "The Greatest Transconian". The award was given to citizen Paul E. Martin, who was a Second World War veteran with the Royal Winnipeg Rifles, a long-serving City Councillor, former mayor of Transcona (1958–1959), and member of the School Board. He was influential in creating the Transcona Historical Museum.

Professional wrestler Kenny Omega (born Tyson Smith) was born and raised in Transcona, and in 2018 became the first Canadian-born IWGP Heavyweight Champion in the title's history. This follows a career in Japanese professional wrestling that includes a number of championship wins across weight classes.

The New Democratic Party politicians, Bill Blaikie, Rebecca Blaikie and Daniel Blaikie were also born and raised in Transcona.

== Sport and recreation ==
Transcona is the home of the Transcona Nationals, a sports team of Football Manitoba that has age groups ranging from 7 to 21.

Three major community clubs and two indoor arenas can be found in the neighbourhood. Park City West, Oxford Heights, and East End Community Clubs organize a variety of recreational activities, while East End and Roland Michener arenas host most on-ice activities.

From 1983 to September 10, 2011, Transcona was represented by the Transcona Railers Hockey team in the MMJHL who played out of the Roland Michener Arena. They were disbanded because the team found it hard to draw players of the required skill levels and numbers. A team of Railers alumni applied for membership into the MMJHL. On January 7, 2012, the league board accepted the new Transcona franchise for the 2012–2013 season. The new team plays at the newly renovated East End Arena in the new side of the building.

Team	Founded	League	Arena	Championships
Transcona Railers	1983–2011	MMJHL	Rolland Mitchener arena	3
Transcona Railer Express	2012	MMJHL	East End Arena	1

== See also ==
- For the film production company Transcona Enterprises, see Judy Garland
- Transcona (electoral district)
- Transcona Historical Museum
- Children of Israel Cemetery – first Jewish cemetery in Manitoba
