= Ash Koley =

Canadian pop band

- Origin: Winnipeg, Manitoba, Canada
- Genres: Alternative pop, new wave
- Years active: 2004-present
- Labels: Nettwerk/Sony Music Canada
- Members: Ashley Michelle Koley; Phil Deschambault
- Website: Ash Koley on MySpace

Ash Koley is a Canadian new wave/alternative pop band from Winnipeg, Manitoba. The band consists of Ash Koley (lead singer), after whom the band is named, and Phil Deschambault (guitar, keyboard).

== History ==
Ashley Michelle Koley was born in Winnipeg, Manitoba. She graduated from Miles MacDonell Collegiate and graduated with her Bachelor of Science in Biochemistry at the University of Winnipeg. During her childhood she studied dance and musical theater. She began formal singing lessons at the age of 5. During her high school years she sang with the group Prodigy, an advanced placed singing group led by producer/songwriter, Zane Zalis. Koley also sang with the Winnipeg-based ABBA tribute group Super Trooper.

Phil Deschambault is an established songwriter, producer, and artist who grew up in Russell, Manitoba. Phil has been a singer/songwriter and guitarist in numerous bands in Winnipeg including Jonah Stone, Not Going to Vegas, and Vanderveen.

Koley and Deschambault met in 2004. The band has stated that Phil was looking for a singer that could complement his style of songwriting, and had immediate chemistry with Koley when the two were introduced to one another by a mutual acquaintance. Glen Willows, founder of Burning Circus Management, signed Ash Koley (the band) to his management company and began to distribute some rough demos of the band, resulting in significant interest from several North American and European publishers. The demos also received interest from Nettwerk Records CEO Terry McBride, who signed the duo in 2009.

== Musical influences ==
Ash Koley has been described as a mix of pop, alternative, and new wave music. The duo have listed a wide range of musical influences, including ABBA, Elton John, The Eurythmics, Annie Lennox, Peter Gabriel, Frank Sinatra, The Cardigans, Prince, Erasure, Imogen Heap, The Pretenders, Scissor Sisters, The Cure, Stevie Wonder, Depeche Mode, Queen, Blondie, Heart, Michael Jackson, Radiohead, and Phoenix.

== Music ==
Ash Koley have released four EPs since their inception: White, Black, Red and Blue. The band began to achieve its greatest mainstream success with the release of their single "Don't Let Your Feet Touch Ground", which reached the top 50 of the Canadian Hot 100. The song was released as a result of a significant growth in popularity due to the exposure it received after being featured on a Lotto 6/49 Canadian Television advertisement. "Don't Let Your Feet Touch Ground" was also featured in performances on the U.S. television show So You Think You Can Dance, on the lobby soundtrack of the Westin chain of hotels, and gained even more exposure after it was used during the broadcast of the 2010 Winter Olympics being held in Vancouver, British Columbia. The song is also used in 2010 UK television adverts for Tombola in semi-exclusive sponsorship of ITV's Emmerdale. Ash Koley's music was also featured in the soundtrack for the Paris Hilton movie The Hottie and the Nottie.

A full-length album release on Nettwerk Records, Inventions, was released in 2010.

The song "Brighter at Night" is featured in a GlobalTV advertisement.

== Discography ==
=== Demo albums ===
Title	Details
Ash Koley	Release date: 2008; Tracklist: 1. Your Skin; 2. Super Trooper Fine Love; 3. Mary the Inventor; 4. Don't Need Anyone to Save Me; 5. Getaway Car; 6. Devils Dance Floor; 7. Young Heart's Waltz; 8. Super Fast Ultra Slow; 9. New Improved Me; 10. Tigers; Some of these tracks were released on the White, Blue, Red and Black EPs with an "Early Version" denotation

=== Studio albums ===
Title	Details
Inventions	Release date: October 5, 2010; Label: Nettwerk Records
Elements	Release date: July 15, 2016; Label: Nettwerk Records

=== Remix albums ===
Title	Details
Acoustic Inventions	Release date: May 8, 2012; Label: Nettwerk Records

=== Extended plays ===
Title	Details
The White EP	Release date: November 10, 2009; Label: Nettwerk Records; Tracklist: 1. Mary the Inventor (Early Version); 2. Go! (Early Version); 3. Trampoline (Early Version)
The Blue EP	Release date: December 22, 2009; Label: Nettwerk Records; Tracklist: 1. Don't Let Your Feet Touch Ground (Early Version); 2. Ten Speed Flying Racing Bike (Early Version); 3. Getaway Car (Early Version)
The Red EP	Release date: February 2, 2010; Label: Nettwerk Records; Tracklist: 1. Sheep in Wolves' Clothing (Early Version); 2. Apple of My Eye (Early Version); 3. Downtime Up (Early Version)
The Black EP	Release date: March 23, 2010; Label: Nettwerk Records; Tracklist: 1. Bugs! (Early Version); 2. Leave the Rest for Dead (Early Version); 3. Balance (Early Version)
Lunchbox	Release date: May 29, 2012; Label: Nettwerk Records; Tracklist: 1. I Don't Need Anyone to Save Me; 2. Getaway Car; 3. Just Like Heaven (The Cure cover)

=== Singles ===
Year	Single	Peak chart positions				Album
Year	Single	CAN	CAN AC	CAN CHR	CAN Hot AC	Album
2010	"Don't Let Your Feet Touch Ground"	50	4	45	15	Inventions
2010	"Sheep in Wolves Clothing"	—	—	—	—	Inventions
2010	"I Don't Need Anyone to Save Me"	—	—	—	—	Inventions
2010	"Brighter at Night"	—	9	—	44	Inventions
2011	"I Can't Feel the Bottom"	—	—	—	—	Inventions
2011	"Apple of My Eye"	—	40	—	—	Inventions
2014	"Criminal"	85	13	34	24	Elements
"—" denotes releases that did not chart
