= Israel Isaac Kahanovitch =

Rabbi Israel Isaac Kahanovitch
- Title: Chief Rabbi of Winnipeg and Western Canada

Personal life
- Born: Yisrael Yitzchak Hakohen Kahanovitch; 8 October 1872 Wołpa, Grodno Governorate, Russian Empire
- Died: June 22, 1945 (aged 72) Winnipeg, Manitoba, Canada
- Buried: Shaarey Zedek Cemetery, Winnipeg
- Spouse: Chiah Rachel Kleiman
- Children: 8
- Education: Grodno yeshiva Slabodka yeshiva

Religious life
- Religion: Judaism
- Denomination: Orthodox Judaism

Jewish leader
- Began: 1906
- Ended: 1945
- Yahrtzeit: 11 Tammuz 5705
- Semikhah: Rabbi Yechiel Michel Epstein

Israel Isaac Kahanovitch (Hebrew: ישראל יצחק הכהן כהנאוויטש, Yisrael Yitzchak Hakohen Kahanovitch) (8 October 1872 – 22 June 1945) was a Polish Canadian Orthodox Jewish rabbi who served as Chief Rabbi of Winnipeg and Western Canada for nearly 40 years. Widely respected for his Talmudic erudition and oratory skills, he strengthened Jewish educational, religious, and social institutions and worked to bridge the divide between religious and secular Jews in Canada. He was a founding member of the Canadian Jewish Congress. In 2010, he was named a Person of National Historic Significance by the Government of Canada.

== Early life and education ==
Israel Isaac Kahanovitch was born in Wołpa, Grodno Governorate, Russian Empire, the son of Rabbi Yehoshua Falk Kahanovitch and his wife, Chana Minces (née Goldin). He was a Kohen. He studied at the Grodno yeshiva and at the Slabodka yeshiva in Kovno Governorate. He received rabbinical ordination at the age of 20 from Rabbi Yechiel Michel Epstein, author of Aruch HaShulchan.

== Rabbinic career ==
From 1900 to 1905, Kahanovitch served as the rabbi of Suwałki, Poland. Late in 1905, he and his wife and young children immigrated to the United States to escape antisemitic pogroms. He took a position as rabbi in Scranton, Pennsylvania from 1905 to 1906. In 1906, he accepted an invitation to serve as rabbi of a new Orthodox congregation, Beth Jacob Synagogue, in Winnipeg. He was named chief rabbi of Winnipeg by unanimous decision of all the city's synagogues. The community had been without rabbinical leadership since 1903. In his new position, Kahanovitch established a central supervisory committee, the Va'ad HaShechitah, to oversee the city's kosher slaughterers. He delivered sermons and taught in the Beth Jacob Synagogue and, later, the Ashkenazi Synagogue. In 1914, he was named Chief Rabbi of Western Canada. He was known and respected across the globe as a rabbi, as evidenced by his correspondence with rabbinic leaders worldwide. Much evidence of the correspondence was lost after his passing, but some can be found in the letters of the Lubavitcher Rebbes.

Kahanovitch strengthened Jewish education in Winnipeg by establishing Talmud study groups and supporting the founding of the Winnipeg Hebrew Free School in 1907. He also helped establish the United Hebrew Charities in the city. He traveled to smaller Jewish communities in Western Canada to support them as well, attending, for example, a teacher's conference in Saskatoon and the dedication of a synagogue in Melville, Saskatchewan.

He was noted for his Talmudic erudition, oratory skills, and "extraordinary energy". He was an active fund-raiser for Jewish communities in Mandatory Palestine, Russia, and Morocco, among others. He did not have a daily schedule other than attendance at the regular prayer services, leaving his home open to petitioners at all hours of the day and night.

In addition, Kahanovitch collected funds for the war relief fund, to help in the effort against Hitler and save Jews in Europe, as gleaned from Canadian newspaper advertisements during that period. Many other organizations of religious and non-religious causes were helped by Kahanovitch as a keynote speaker at fundraising gatherings in Winnipeg. Kahanovitch collected the funds for distribution, and personally recorded every dollar that was raised for distribution to the poor, hospitals, old age homes, and orphanages, not keeping any money for himself or his household, rather giving it completely to charity. During his evenings, he would be raising money for the many causes, or performing one of the over 5,000 marriage ceremonies for the Jewish community, each of which was meticulously documented in a ledger as sourced by his family and preserved. When a spare moment was available, Kahanovitch could be seen deep in Talmudic study, as told by his daughter to his great-grandson.

When rumors circulated in 1927 that Kahanovitch might leave Winnipeg, Jewish community leaders raised funds to add to his salary. While Kahanovitch received offers to lead Jewish communities in Toronto and Los Angeles, and was tapped as a successor to Ashkenazi Chief Rabbi of Mandatory Palestine, Rabbi Abraham Isaac Kook, he preferred to stay in Winnipeg.

== Ideology ==
Kahanovitch identified with the Mizrachi religious Zionist movement. He established a Mizrachi organization in Winnipeg that promoted both Zionism and Judaism, and was a member of the local B'nai Zion Society and the Zionist Council of Winnipeg. At the same time, he made efforts to bridge the divide between religious and secular Jews. He attended meetings of secular and political Zionist groups without endorsing their agenda. He served as a member of the national executive of the Zionist Organization of Canada and was a frequent attendee to its conventions.

Kahanovitch was a founding member of the Canadian Jewish Congress and an elected delegate to that group's first convention in Montreal in 1919. Unlike other Orthodox rabbis who spoke out against the socialist and radical elements in the Congress, Kahanovitch pursued a course of unity with them. According to his biographer, M. S. Stern:

In the early years, it took a person of great courage and conviction to espouse a Zionist orientation, even a religious one, while staying, in other respects, within the mainstream of orthodox life and rabbinic practice. Such a man was Rabbi I. I. Kahanovitch.

== Personal life ==
Kahanovitch married Chiah Rachel Kleiman on 5 July 1896. They had five daughters and three sons. Despite Kahanovitch's popularity as Chief Rabbi of Winnipeg, the family struggled to make ends meet. They supplemented his annual synagogue stipends and donations that he received from conducting wedding ceremonies by maintaining a vegetable garden, chicken coop, and five goats behind their house.

Kahanovitch died at his Winnipeg home on 22 June 1945. He was buried beside his wife, who had predeceased him in 1940, in the Shaarey Zedek Cemetery in Winnipeg. His funeral was attended by an estimated 5,000 people, representing approximately one-third of the total adult Jewish population of the city at that time.

On January 12, 2010, Kahanovitch was named a Person of National Historic Significance by the Government of Canada. A commemorative plaque was unveiled at the Jewish Heritage Centre in Winnipeg on March 22, 2016. A Manitoba Heritage Council Plaque also honors Kahanovitch at the YWHA – Jewish Community Centre in Winnipeg.

== See also ==
- Persons of National Historic Significance

== Sources ==
- Giesbrecht, Jodi (1983), "Chief Rabbi Israel Isaac Kahanovitch: His National Significance", Jewish Life and Times: A collection of essays, vol. IX, Jewish Historical Society of Western Canada, ISBN 0969125682
- Goodman, J. J. (2011). Collected Writings: A Translation From Yiddish To English. Xlibris Corporation. ISBN 978-1453538173.
- Levine, Allan (2009). Coming of Age: A history of the Jewish people of Manitoba. Heartland Associates. ISBN 978-1896150529.
- Stern, M.S. (1984), "Rabbi in a Changing Neighborhood: Israel Isaac Kahanovitch Chief Rabbi of Winnipeg 1906-1945." Rabbi I.I. Kahanovitch Memorial Journal.
