= Zack Williams (Canadian football) =

Canadian gridiron football player (born 1997)

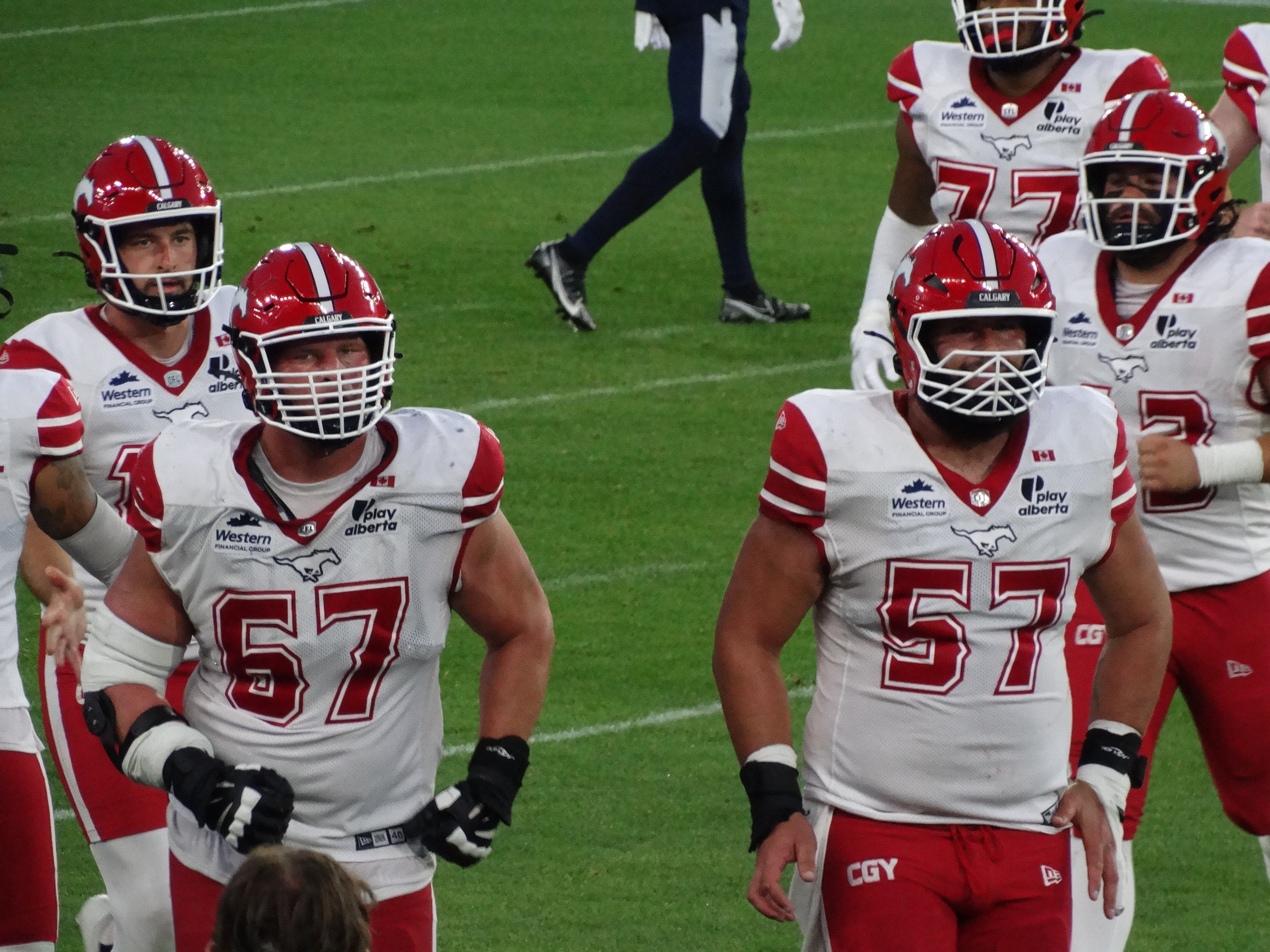
- Williams with the Calgary Stampeders in 2026

No. 67 – Calgary Stampeders
- Position: Offensive lineman
- Roster status: Active
- CFL status: National

Personal information
- Born: March 2, 1997 (age 29); Winnipeg, Manitoba, Canada
- Listed height: 6 ft 5 in (1.96 m)
- Listed weight: 307 lb (139 kg)

Career information
- High school: Murdoch MacKay Collegiate
- CJFL: Winnipeg Rifles
- University: Manitoba
- CFL draft: 2019: 3rd round, 28th overall pick

Career history
- 2019–present: Calgary Stampeders

Awards and highlights
- CFL West All-Star (2025)
- Stats at CFL.ca

Zackary Williams (born March 2, 1997) is a Canadian professional football offensive lineman for the Calgary Stampeders of the Canadian Football League (CFL).

== Early life ==
Williams first played football at Murdoch MacKay Collegiate in grade 10 and was selected to Team Canada in 2014. He played junior football for the Winnipeg Rifles in grade 12.

== University career ==
Williams played U Sports football for the Manitoba Bisons from 2015 to 2018. He played in 32 regular season games for the program.

== Professional career ==
Pre-draft measurables
Height	Weight	40-yard dash	20-yard shuttle	Three-cone drill	Vertical jump	Broad jump	Bench press
6 ft 5 in (1.96 m)	318 lb (144 kg)	5.27 s	4.84 s	8.18 s	28.0 in (0.71 m)	8 ft 10 in (2.69 m)	18 reps
All values from CFL Combine

Williams was drafted in the third round, 28th overall, by the Calgary Stampeders in the 2019 CFL draft and signed with the team on May 13, 2019. He began the 2019 season on the practice roster, but made his professional debut on October 5, 2019, against the Montreal Alouettes. He played in two regular season games during his rookie season. Williams did not play in 2020 due to the cancellation of the 2020 CFL season.

In 2021, Williams played in all 14 regular season games and started at left guard in 13 of them. He made his playoff debut in the West Semi-Final loss to the Saskatchewan Roughriders where he started at left guard. Williams continued his strong play in 2022 starting all 18 regular-season games. Following the season he signed a two-year contract extension with the Stamps.

== Personal life ==
Williams was born to parents Tracy and Owen Williams and has one sister and one brother.
