= Transcona Museum =

Municipal museum in Manitoba, Canada

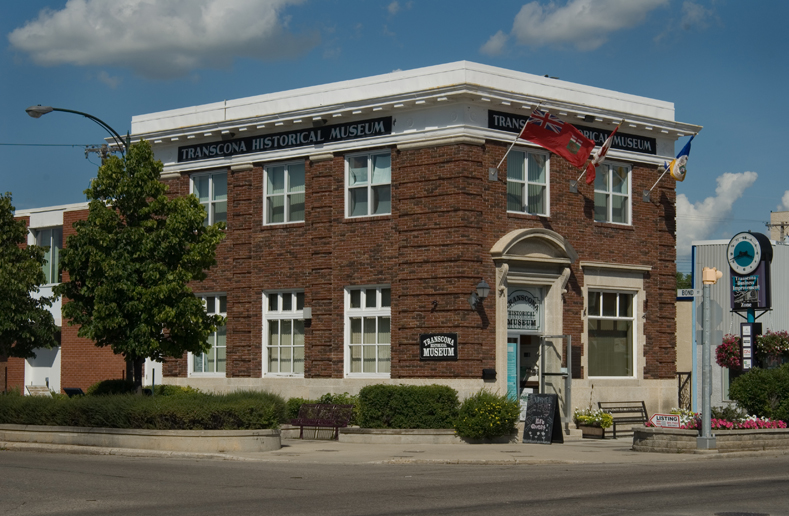
- Transcona Museum
- Established: 1967; 59 years ago
- Location: 141 Regent Ave. W
- Coordinates: 49°53′43.3″N 97°00′19.0″W
- Type: Civic museum
- Treasurer: Darcy Robert
- President: Rick Walker
- Curators: Alanna Horejda; Jennifer Maxwell (Asst.)
- Public transit access: 46 Transcona Express; 47 Transcona - Pembina; 89 - North Transcona - Kildonan Place
- Website: www.transconamuseum.mb.ca

Transcona Museum is a museum in Winnipeg, Manitoba, that's mission is to preserve and promote the community spirit of Transcona, through sharing our history and stories for the benefit of all.

The museum was founded in 1967 as Transcona's Centennial Project celebrating the 100th anniversary of the Confederation of Canada and officially opened on October 15, 1968. It was originally located in the basement of the Transcona Public Library.

Today, the museum is located in one of two municipally designated heritage building in Transcona. This historic building was originally constructed by the Bank of Toronto in 1925 and later served as the Transcona Municipal Office. This building is owned and operated by the City of Winnipeg.

Over the years, the TM has acquired an extensive collection of artifacts, photographs and documentary records that together tell the story of Transcona's community history. These collections include everything from railway artifacts, items from early Transcona businesses, historic clothing and household objects, to special natural and cultural history collections. The Museum is affiliated with the CMA, CHIN, and Virtual Museum of Canada.

In the early 2000s, Transcona Museum planned for expansion.

== Archives ==
The Archives contains documents reflecting the history of Transcona and surrounding area. The archival collection consists primarily of photographs and textual documents including maps, plans, technical drawings, minutes, correspondence, newspapers, and ephemeral records. The main subjects represented include railways - primarily the Canadian National Railway in Transcona, municipal records of the Town and City of Transcona, World War II, local organizations, education, sports, special events, and individuals in the community.

== Collections ==
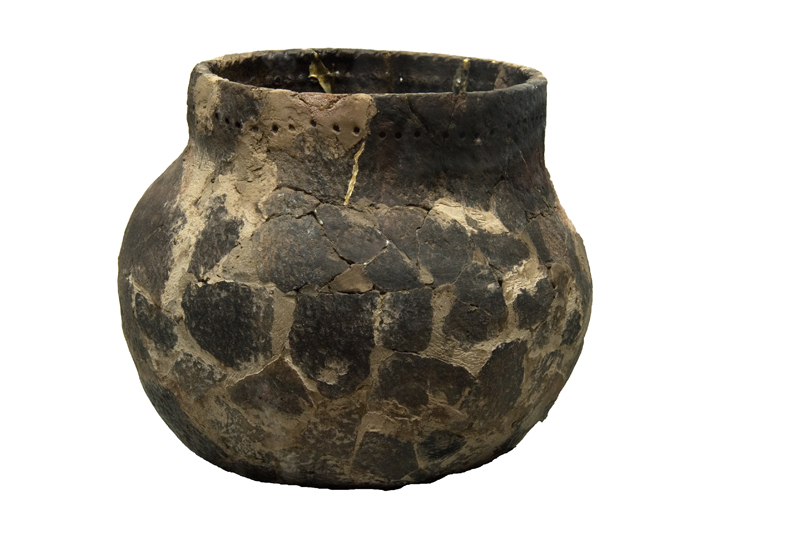
Clearwater Lake Vessel Reconstruction from the Cecil Patterson Collection

The Transcona Museum is home to an extensive collection of roughly 4,000 community based artifacts, many of which were used by people in Transcona. The diverse nature of the holdings are composed of material culture artifacts which depict the human history of the area. The collection holdings include household artifacts and domestic tools, decorative art objects, personal care artifacts, mechanical tools and equipment, technological office equipment, farming implements and equipment, transportation artifacts, leisure artifacts, and a wide range of military objects related to the Boer War, First World War, and Second World War.

The Transcona Museum preserves a collection of over 800 clothing and textiles articles from Transcona residents.

=== The Cecil Patterson Archaeology Collection ===
The Cecil Patterson Archaeology Collection contains roughly 3,500 artifacts from over 80 archaeological sites across Manitoba. The earliest pieces in the collection were made over 10,000 years ago. The collection is composed of archaeological objects from many of Manitoba's First Nations cultures, including the Cree, Anishinaabe, Inuit, Dakota and Chipewyan.

The collection provides a glimpse of pre-European contact life in the boreal forest, aspen parkland, and prairie regions of Manitoba. Most artifacts were used for hunting, hide preparation, and food preparation. These include projectile points, bifaces, scrapers, grooved axe heads, mauls, pottery and rim shards. Ethnological objects include moccasins, mitts, garments, beaded necklaces, and clothing accessories.

=== The Christopher Stephen Quelch Lepidoptera Collection ===
The Christopher Stephen Quelch Lepidoptera Collection contains over 8000 specimens of moths and butterflies from across the world with a focus on Manitoba. The collection also contains over 1000 birds eggs.

=== CN 2747 ===
In 2015, the Transcona Museum acquired the CN 2747 steam locomotive. The CN 2747 was the first steam locomotive built in the Western Region by CN and was built in the Transcona Shops. It was the first of 33 steam locomotives that were built at the Transcona Shops. In 1960, the engine was retired and placed in the then Kiwanis Park for the community as "a token of the dedication of the citizens of the Town of Transcona" of the In 2017, the museum had a condition assessment completed and began to make repairs to preserve the life of the engine. The museum is currently fundraising to build a protective enclosure over the engine to protect it from the elements but also provide additional accessibility and interpretation opportunities while keeping the engine secure.

== Current exhibits ==
- Common Technology: From Past Lives to Future Ideas
- Celebrating 50 Years: The Founding of the Transcona Museum
- Treasures of the Transcona Museum
- Interactive Discovery Centre
- Virtual Exhibit: "Serving King and Country: Transcona's Hometown Heroes"

== Sources ==
- Association of Manitoba Museums Directory
