= Solomon Frank =

American-Canadian Orthodox rabbi and speaker

Rabbi Dr. Solomon Frank

Personal life
- Born: January 5, 1900 New York City, US
- Died: October 21, 1982 (aged 82) Montreal, Quebec, Canada
- Buried: Mount Royal Cemetery, Outremont, Quebec
- Spouse: Elsie Frank
- Children: 1
- Education: B.Sc., University of Buffalo, 1922; LL.B., University of Buffalo, 1923; M.A., University of Manitoba; PhD, University of Manitoba

Religious life
- Religion: Judaism
- Denomination: Orthodox Judaism

Jewish leader
- Position: Rabbinical leader
- Synagogue: Shaarey Zedek Synagogue, Winnipeg
- Began: 1926
- Ended: 1947
- Other: Spiritual leader, Spanish and Portuguese Synagogue of Montreal
- Semikhah: at Hebrew Union College, Cincinnati, Ohio

Solomon Frank (January 5, 1900 – October 21, 1982) was an American–Canadian Orthodox rabbi, speaker, and civic and community leader. He served as rabbinic leader of Shaarey Zedek Synagogue of Winnipeg, Canada, from 1926 to 1947, and spiritual leader of the Spanish and Portuguese Synagogue of Montreal from 1947 until his death. Active in interfaith affairs, he was also a chaplain for Jewish and Christian organizations and hospitals. In Montreal, he broadcast a weekly radio message on Jewish thought and practice for more than 25 years.

== Early life and education ==
Solomon Frank was born on January 5, 1900, in New York City, the only child of Abraham and Gerta Frank. At age 4, he moved with his parents to Buffalo, New York, where he attended public schools. He obtained a Bachelor of Science degree from the University at Buffalo in 1922 and a Bachelor of Laws from the same institution in 1923. He received his rabbinic ordination at Hebrew Union College in Cincinnati, Ohio. He later earned a master's degree and PhD at the University of Manitoba.

== Career ==
=== New York ===
From 1922 to 1924, Frank served as associate rabbi of Temple Beth Zion in Buffalo. Originally his duties involved teaching high school classes in the temple's religious education division and giving adult lectures. However, due to the illness of the main rabbi, he was called upon to lead the synagogue services. He discussed some of the ideas he lectured about—Zionism, the situation in Mandatory Palestine, the success of the League of Women Voters, and evolution—in a local newspaper interview in 1924. He delivered a eulogy for President Woodrow Wilson in the synagogue in February 1924. From 1925 to 1926, Frank served as rabbi of Temple Beth David in the same city.

=== Winnipeg ===
In 1926, Frank was appointed rabbinical leader of Shaarey Zedek Synagogue in Winnipeg, Canada. According to the Manitoba Historical Society, Frank applied his training from his Reform rabbinical seminary to oversee "the gradual liberalization of synagogue practice at Shaarey Zedek without initiating any radical breaks with tradition". Frank was the first rabbi of an Orthodox synagogue in Western Canada to deliver his sermons in English rather than Yiddish. In 1929, Shaarey Zedek changed its ideology from Orthodox to Conservative, and introduced more English to the services a number of years after that.

In addition to his rabbinical duties, Frank was very active in community affairs. He served as president of the Winnipeg lodge of B'nai Brith, president of the League of Nations Society, vice-president of the United Nations Society, and executive director of the Winnipeg Joint Public Relations Committee. He assisted in the founding of the first Winnipeg chapter of the Canadian Legion. During World War II, he was a part-time chaplain with the Canadian army and visited a Canadian field hospital in Europe. He was also a chaplain of the Canadian Club of Winnipeg, the Jewish Scouts and Guides, and Mount Sinai Lodge, president of the 9th Manitoba Provincial Command, Boy Scouts Association, and Grand Chancellor of the Knights of Pythias.

In 1939, Frank and his wife were among the 105 prominent Canadian personages invited to a royal luncheon at Government House to welcome the King and Queen.

Frank was a popular speaker for both community and civic groups. He was also active in interfaith affairs. In 1935, he delivered a sermon at a "joint service of worship and thanksgiving" at the city's Knox Church upon the silver jubilee of King George V. In 1940, he joined a symposium with Catholic and Protestant clerics to discuss "Common Ground". He shared the podium with Dr. E. Crossley Hunter, pastor at Knox Church and chairman of the Canadian Conference of Christians and Jews, at Fellowship Day of the Young Men's Hebrew Association in March 1942.

=== Montreal ===
In 1947, Frank moved to Montreal to become spiritual leader of the Spanish and Portuguese Synagogue of Montreal. Under his leadership, daily morning and evening services were reinstated in 1949 along with the Shabbat morning Kiddush. From 1949 onwards, membership increased and overflow services were required on the High Holy Days in two additional locations. Frank was one of the officiators at a synagogue memorial service for King George VI on the day of his funeral, February 15, 1952.

In Montreal, too, Frank involved himself in civic and community affairs. He was a member of B'nai Brith and the Montreal Rotary Club, and served as a deputy chaplain at the Masonic Grand Lodge of Quebec. He performed chaplaincy services for the Jewish General Hospital, Verdun General Hospital, Queen Mary Veterans' Hospital, St. Anne's Veterans' Hospital, Montreal Children's Hospital, the Archambault penitentiary, and the Bordeaux jail. In 1948, he was one of the founders of the Cercle juif de lange française, a lecture and publishing society within the Canadian Jewish Congress.

In spring 1962, Frank visited Jerusalem and after his return spoke about the religious and historical implications of the discovery of the Dead Sea Scrolls before a meeting of the St. James Literary Society.

Frank delivered a popular Sunday-morning radio message on CJAD radio in which he explained aspects of Jewish thought and practice. The program was followed by Jews and Christians alike for a quarter of a century.

== Awards and honors ==
In 1936, Frank received the Tau Delta Phi medal from the Omega chapter of the University of Manitoba for his intercultural and interfaith work. In 1962, he was presented with the B'nai Brith Community Service Award for "outstanding contribution to life in Montreal". In 1968, he was awarded the Canada Centennial Medal.

== Personal life ==
Frank and his wife, Elsie, had one daughter.

Frank died of a brain tumor on October 21, 1982, aged 82. He was buried in the Spanish and Portuguese Section of the Mount Royal Cemetery in Outremont, Quebec.

== Legacy ==
Upon Frank's death, the Spanish and Portuguese Synagogue of Montreal established a memorial fund in his memory. A book of essays, which the editors intended to present to Frank on the occasion of his eightieth birthday, was instead published as a memorial volume for the occasion of the unveiling of his gravestone on October 2, 1983.

== Bibliography ==
- Frank, Solomon (1968). Two Centuries in the Life of a Synagogue. Montreal: Spanish and Portuguese Synagogue.

== Sources ==
- Gottesman, Eli (1965). Who's Who in Canadian Jewry. Jewish Institute of Higher Research.
- Joseph, Howard; Lightstone, Jack N.; Oppenheim, Michael, eds. (1983). Truth and Compassion: Essays on Judaism and Religion in Memory of Rabbi Dr. Solomon Frank. Wilfrid Laurier University Press. ISBN 978-0-889-20143-9.
- Langlais, Jacques; Rome, David (2010). Jews and French Quebecers: Two Hundred Years of Shared History. Wilfrid Laurier University Press. ISBN 9781554587261.
- Segal, Hugh (2010). The Long Road Back: Creating Canada's New Conservative Party. HarperCollins Canada. ISBN 978-1-554-68948-4.
- Shuchat, Wilfred (2000). Gate of Heaven: The Story of Congregation Shaar Hashomayim in Montreal, 1846-1996. McGill-Queen's Press. ISBN 978-0-773-56866-2.
- Stingel, Janine (2000). Social Discredit: Anti-Semitism, Social Credit, and the Jewish Response. McGill-Queen's Press. ISBN 978-0-773-52010-3.
