= Miles Macdonell Collegiate =

- The 4 points on the compass stand for Direction, Exploration, Inclusion, and Compassion.

Location
- 757 Roch St; Winnipeg, Manitoba, R2K 2R1; Canada; 49.9240°N 97.0957°W

Information
- School type: Public high school
- Founded: 1952
- School district: River East Transcona School Division
- Superintendent: Sandra Herbst
- Principal: John Muller
- Grades: 9 – 12
- Enrollment: 1,355 students (incl 314 EAL, and 475 French Immersion); 138 staff (2024)
- Language: English, French Immersion, Spanish, Japanese
- Colours: Green, gold & white
- Team name: Buckeyes
- Website: www.retsd.mb.ca/miles

A Miles Mac Football Helmet

Miles Macdonell Collegiate, sometimes referred to as Miles Mac, is a high school in Winnipeg, Manitoba that opened in September 1952 and is part of the River East Transcona School Division. Up until 2023, it was one of the six schools in Manitoba that participated in the International Baccalaureate Program, having announced its end in March of that year. The school offers classes in French Immersion geared towards university attendance in either official language. Miles Macdonell also offers the High School Apprenticeship Program (HSAP), which is a program that allows students the opportunity to start an apprenticeship in the skilled trades prior to graduating.

The school is named after Miles Macdonell who, as the first governor of the Red River Settlement, led the Red River Settlers in 1812 and reported directly to Lord Selkirk, founder of the settlement. He is commemorated with a plaque that can be found just inside the front doors on Roch Avenue.

Several extracurricular programs offered at Miles MacDonnell include, but are not limited to: Reach for the Top, Chess Club, several Athletics Programs, Mathematics Club, Theatrical Productions, Musical programming such as Jazz band & Compass (formerly Prodigy), Youth in Philanthropy (YiP), KEY Club (Kiwanis Youth), Vietnam Orphanage Committee, and others.

== Construction ==
Miles Macdonell Collegiate was originally two separate schools and therefore occupies two main buildings. The north wing was originally Melrose Junior High which existed from 1954 to 1962. These buildings are linked by a hallway which, although it is above ground, is referred to as "The Tunnel". It was built in 1970 replacing a smaller 10 foot wide tunnel built in 1964. The Tunnel not only connects the two buildings, but is also home to the library and the theatre, previously connecting to the arts room as well. The original part of school, the present science wing, was built in 1952. It was followed by a 1955 addition, the south wing second floor, and a 1960 addition which added a gym and the school east of the tunnel. The former Melrose Junior High building became part of the school in 1962 and the current theatre, library and tunnel were added in 1970. In the 2010-2011 school year, two elevators were added to allow wheelchair access to the north and middle section second floors. In 2020, a large, new gym opened replacing the former Gyms A and B which were converted to other uses.

== Music Program ==
Several albums have been produced in the school, mainly consisting of the school's choir program and their prestigious vocal group called "Prodigy", consisting of a small number of talented singers. Prodigy has performed in various countries, including Scotland, Austria, Mexico, and the United States. When Queen Elizabeth II came to Winnipeg in 2003, Prodigy was asked to perform for her, as well as performing at the International Peace Gardens for the 5th anniversary of the September 11 attacks. Following the retirement of music teacher Zane Zalis in 2022, Prodigy was renamed to Compass and consists of vocals as well as other assorted instruments.

== Festival Théâtre Jeunesse ==
On May 8, 2008, a group of students from the French Immersion program participated in the annual Festival Théâtre Jeunesse at the Centre Culturel Franco-Manitobain (Franco-Manitoban Cultural Centre). The group performed a piece titled "Le long voyage" (The Long Voyage), which won the top prize in the General Production category.

== Alumni Association ==
The Alumni Association of the collegiate began coalescing in 1997 in preparation for a 50th anniversary reunion in 2002, and was officially incorporated as the “Miles Macdonell Collegiate Alumni Association” in 2003.

In 2002, a group of alumni created a trust fund which has raised over $138,000 for the collegiate as of June 2024.

== Notable alumni ==
- Chad Allan, musician
- Charlie Birt, politician
- Ryan Bonni, hockey player
- Adrian Bradford, musician/music engineer
- Len Cariou, actor
- Dave Chomiak, politician
- Jay Churko, musician
- Jelynn Dela Cruz, politician
- Ash Koley, musician
- Bryce Kushnier, musician
- Jeremy Kushnier, musician
- Bill Masterton, hockey player
- Cathy Shaw, curler
- Tracy Schmidt, politician
- Rachelle Schott, politician
