= Shaarey Zedek Synagogue (Winnipeg) =

Jewish house of worship in Canada

Religion
- Affiliation: Conservative Judaism
- Status: Active

Location
- Location: Winnipeg, Manitoba, Canada
- Interactive map of Shaarey Zedek Synagogue
- Coordinates: 49.877222°N 97.161667°W

Architecture
- Architects: Green, Blankstein, Russell and Associates
- Completed: 1950

Specifications
- Capacity: 1,500
- Materials: Tyndall stone

Website
- shaareyzedek.mb.ca

Shaarey Zedek Synagogue ("Gates of Righteousness") is the oldest synagogue in Winnipeg, Manitoba, Canada. Formed in 1880, the congregation's first building was constructed by Philip Brown and several others in 1890. Architect Charles Henry Wheeler designed the original Synagogue on King Street (1889–90).

The synagogue has been located at 561 Wellington Crescent off Academy Road, on the western bank of the Assiniboine River, since 1950.

== History ==
Before the synagogues came to be established by Jews in Canada, history of emigration to Canada, very much before World War I, is replete with the hardships faced due to migration from Russia and other countries and living under very trying conditions. The first settlers came to Canada much earlier in 1880. Canada was in need of immigrants and Jews from Russia and other countries fitted the bill. Initially the community established temporary synagogues in rented houses.

However, the first congregation of Jews had begun in 1880 when a tiny group of Jewish migrants formed together. By 1891, the Jewish population of Winnipeg had grown to 645 persons, and 1156 persons by 1901, bringing about a demand in the city for synagogues to be built. The community bought a plot (at the corner of King and Common (now Henry) streets) to build a synagogue, in 1887 from William Gomez de Fonseca, at a cost of $1,250. The synagogue was built to the plans of Architect Charles H. Wheeler and by 1889 it was completed and named as “Shaarey Zedek”, meaning “the Gates of Righteousness” It was consecrated on 20 March 1890. Its coloured windows and tabernacles were made of finest Italian and American marble. Additional land of 4 ha was purchased in 1894 to have an exclusive cemetery, named the Shaarey Zedek Cemetery, that serves the community to this day. The original Shaarey Zedek Synagogue was located on Henry Avenue and 315 King Street. Built in 1890, it was the first of many synagogue buildings erected in Winnipeg, built three years before Rosh Pina Synagogue on Henry Avenue.

The principal members of the Bethel Synagogue established their own conservative synagogue in 1899 and called it the Shaarey Zedek. The synagogue premises had its own cemetery. A Hebrew school also functioned here for several years. In 1899, it was located on 37 Martha Street, and T. Finkelstein was its president. Rabbi Solomon Frank occupied the synagogue's pulpit from 1926 until 1947, following Rabbi Herbert J. Samuel. Frank was succeeded by Rabbi Milton Aron.

In 1902, the first Canadian Talmud Torah was opened in a new building next to Shaarey Zedek Synagogue.

In 1913, proposals to build a new the synagogue were put off. This was done to absorb a branch congregation which had earlier established its own synagogue at Shaarey Shomayim could not sustain itself due to financial difficulties. Following this merger the main older synagogue was expanded. However, a new building came to be established only in 1950.

Aron became the first rabbi of the new synagogue which opened as 561 Wellington Crescent off Academy Road, near the Assiniboine River, in 1950.

The synagogue has been used for meetings during important events in its history. In 1982, it was subject to a Conservative General-by-Law, amended in 1991. The NA has microfilmed records of Shaarey Zedek Synagogue, Winnipeg from 1889 to 1983, along with Holy Blossom Temple, Toronto from 1856 to 1969.

The Shaarey Zedek Synagogue conforms to Conservative Judaism and claims to promote spiritual growth, continuing education and the enrichment of life cycle events of its community.

== Architecture ==
The current building was built on Wellington Crescent throughout 1949 it opened in 1950. The building is a long, light grey stone complex, consisting of oblong architectural pieces, overlooking a lawn and the river. It more resembles a university campus or a government building than a synagogue. The synagogue is noted for its beautiful stained glass windows, designed by Leo Mol and documented by the Institute for stained glass in Canada. It has capacity to hold 1,500 members.

The synagogue is located north of Munson Park, near the Maryland Bridge, Rehabilitation Centre for Children, Lutheran Church of the Redeemer and First Unitarian Universalist Church of Winnipeg, across the river from the Westgate Mennonite Collegiate and the Cornish Library.
