= Transcona Collegiate Institute =

Transcona Collegiate Institute (TCI)

Location
- 1305 Winona St. Winnipeg, Manitoba, R2C 2P9; Canada; 49.9036°N 97.0087°W

Information
- School type: Public high school
- Founded: 1961
- School district: River East Transcona School Division
- Superintendent: Sandra Herbst
- Principal: Anita Maharaj
- Grades: 9-12
- Enrollment: 670
- Language: English
- Area: Transcona
- Colours: Green, white and black
- Team name: Titans
- Website: www.tci.retsd.mb.ca

Transcona Collegiate Institute (TCI) is a secondary education institution located in the Transcona suburb of Winnipeg, Manitoba. Transcona Collegiate teaches grades nine through twelve, with approximately 670 students and 60 staff members.

Transcona Collegiate was opened in 1961, and in the following year an additional six classrooms were added. During the 1999–2000 school year a 16,000 sq ft (1,500 m^{2}) addition was added to the school, extending out to the west and north.

== Administration ==
Principal- Anita Maharaj

Vice Principal- Chris Dasch

Vice Principal- Joel Soroko

Vice Principal- Kelly Plunkett

== Athletics ==
Hockey: TCI has 2 division C championship in hockey 2004/05 and in 2007/08. The team is currently in Price division of the WHSHL after going to the 3rd round of the 2016-17 b division playoffs.

Basketball: The Varsity Boys Basketball team won the 2007/08 KPAC Tier 2 Championships. The Junior Varsity Boys Basketball team won the 2013/14 and 2022/23 KPAC Tier 2 Championships. The Junior Varsity Boys Basketball team won the 2021-22 AAA Provincial championship; the first provincial Championship in school history

Volleyball: The Varsity Boys Volleyball team won the 2010/11 KPAC Championships, who also went undefeated all season. In 2013 the Junior Varsity Boys Volleyball team won the tier 2 KPAC Championship. In 2014 the Junior Varsity Girls Volleyball team won the tier 2 KPAC championship, and went undefeated for the first time in school history. In 2017 the Junior Varsity Girls Volleyball team won the tier 1 KPAC Championship and went to Provincials where they got eliminated in the semi-final.

Lacrosse: TCI has 1 Brian Vandette B division championship in 2011/2012. That season the Titans went undefeated.

== Notable alumni ==
- Nello Altomare Member of the Legislative Assembly of Manitoba for Transcona and Minister of Education and Early Childhood Learning (Class of 1981)
- Shannon Corbett Member of the Legislative Assembly of Manitoba for Transcona (Class of 1988)
- Leonard Evans Member of the Legislative Assembly of Manitoba for Brandon East
- Petric (band) - Country band including alumni Tom and Jason Petric. Jason graduated in 2007 and Tom graduated in 2010.
- Tyson Smith - Professional wrestler and executive vice president under the ring name "Kenny Omega" in All Elite Wrestling (AEW). Graduated in 2001.
- Andrew Micklefield Former Member of the Legislative Assembly of Manitoba for Rossmere
- Wilson Parasiuk Member of the Legislative Assembly of Manitoba for Transcona
