= Collège Pierre-Elliott-Trudeau =

Collège Pierre-Eliott-Trudeau

Location
- 216 Redonda Street; Winnipeg, Manitoba, R2C 1L6; Canada; 49.8971°N 96.9784°W

Information
- School type: Public French Immersion high school
- Founded: 1990
- School district: River East Transcona School Division
- Superintendent: Sandra Herbst
- Principal: Lisa Comte
- Grades: 9 - 12
- Language: French Immersion
- Colours: Red, White and Black
- Mascot: Pierre Le Loup (Pierre The Wolf)
- Team name: Les Canadiens (The Canadians)
- Website: www.retsd.mb.ca/school/cpet/Pages/default.aspx

Collège Pierre-Elliott-Trudeau is part of River East Transcona School Division in Winnipeg, Manitoba. It opened its doors in September 1990 with a population of 140 students and 14 teachers. By 2006, the school had grown to 330 students and a staff of 21 teachers. In 2006, Collège Pierre-Elliott-Trudeau was designated a UNESCO school. United Nations Educational, Scientific and Cultural Organisation which there declared purpose is to contribute to peace and security by promoting international collaboration through educational, scientific, and cultural reforms in order to increase universal respect for justice, the rule of law, and human rights along with fundamental freedom proclaimed in the United Nations Charter. It was the first and only public school that was approved by Prime Minister Pierre Elliott Trudeau to be named after him.

== Courses ==
CPET is a French Immersion school, with only courses in English Language Arts being taught in English. A variety of courses are offered; however, the choice is limited due to the demographics and size of the student population. Throughout the years both English, French, Mathematics and Gym courses are mandatory.

== Notable alumni ==
- Leila Dance Member of Parliament for Elmwood–Transcona (Class of 1996)
