= Makarov (Hasidic dynasty) =

Hasidic dynasty

Makarov is a Hasidic dynasty founded by the Rebbe Menachem Nochum Twerski of the Chernobyl dynasty. Makarov is the Yiddish name of Makariv, a town in present-day Ukraine. To this day, the Mekarev Shul is used in the old City of Safed for Shabbat Prayers by the Yeshiva Shalom Rav.

== Lineage ==
- Rebbe Menachem Nochum Twersky of Makarov (1805–1851), son of the Rebbe Mordechai Twersky of Chernobyl
  - Rebbe Yaakov Yitzchok of Makarov (died 1892), son of the Rebbe Nochum.
    - Dov Ber Tversky (2002-current), son of Reb Yaakov Yitzchok Tversky, and mechaber of renowned sefer Dover Tzedakos al Hatorah.
