= River East Transcona School Division =

School district in Manitoba, Canada

Coordinates: 49.920°N 97.100°W

Location
- 589 Roch St, Winnipeg, MB R2K 2P7

District information
- Established: 2002
- Superintendent: Sandra Herbst
- Chair of the board: Colleen Carswell
- Schools: 42

Students and staff
- Students: 18,200 (2024)
- Teachers: 1,400
- Staff: 3,500

Other information
- Elected trustees: 9
- Website: retsd.mb.ca/

River East Transcona School Division (RETSD) is a school division located in Winnipeg, Manitoba. As the second largest school division in the province, it is composed of parts of what used to be two separate divisions that merged in 2002: the urban section (i.e., Transcona) of the Transcona-Springfield School Division; and the River East School Division.

RETSD provides educational services to approximately 18,200 students in 42 schools, as well as operating the McLeod Education Centre for adult learning. The division employs approximately 1,400 teachers and 670 support staff, and offers English and French-immersion programming, as well as English-German bilingual and Ukrainian bilingual.

== Schools and students ==
As of 30 October 2024, RETSD has a total of 18,200 students.

RETSD is composed of 42 schools—36 elementary & middle schools and 6 high schools—and 2 learning centres. Schools in River East Transcona are listed below.

=== Early years ===
- Angus McKay School
- Bertrun E. Glavin School
- Bird's Hill School
- Donwood School
- Dr. F.W.L. Hamilton School
- École Centrale
- École Margaret-Underhill
- École Neil Campbell School
- École Springfield Heights School
- École Sun Valley School
- Emerson School
- Hampstead School
- Harold Hatcher School
- John de Graff School
- Joseph Teres School
- Lord Wolseley School
- Maple Leaf School
- Polson School
- Prince Edward School
- Princess Margaret School
- Radisson School
- Sherwood School
- Wayoata School
- Westview School

=== Middle school and mixed ===
Early/middle years:

- Bernie Wolfe School
- École Salisbury Morse Place School
- John Pritchard School

Middle schools:

- Arthur Day Middle School
- Chief Peguis Middle School
- École John Henderson Middle School
- École Munroe Middle School
- École Regent Park
- John W. Gunn Middle School
- École Robert Andrews Middle School
- Valley Gardens Middle School

=== High schools ===
- Collège Miles Macdonell Collegiate
- Collège Pierre-Elliott-Trudeau
- John G. Stewart School
- Kildonan-East Collegiate
- Murdoch MacKay Collegiate
- River East Collegiate
- Transcona Collegiate Institute

== See also ==
- List of school districts in Manitoba
- Manitoba School Boards Association
