= St. John's High School (Winnipeg) =

Coordinates: 49.9251°N 97.1355°W

St. John’s High School
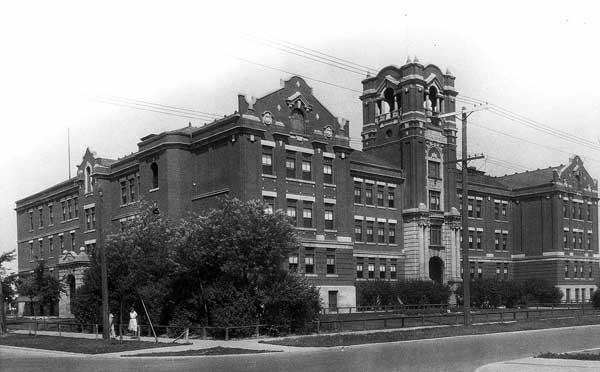

Location
- 401 Church Ave; Winnipeg, Manitoba, R2W 1C4; Canada

Information
- Type: Public junior and senior high school
- Established: 1912
- School district: Winnipeg School Division
- Principal: Brad Davidson
- Grades: 7–12
- Enrolment: 1002
- Colours: Orange and Black
- Team name: St. John's Tigers
- Website: https://www.winnipegsd.ca/StJohn

St. John's High School is a public high school from grades 7-12 in Winnipeg, Manitoba, Canada. The school is located in the North End of the city and is in the Winnipeg School Division.

== Founding ==
St. John's started in 1909 at Luxton School, on the second floor. That first year there were 89 students, and 4 teachers. Mr. Campbell was principal. Orange and brown became the school colours. In 1912, with the completion of the building at Machray and Salter, the school moved to its present location.

Designed by Winnipeg school architect J. B. Mitchell and built between 1910 and 1912, St. John's Technical High School opened for classes in 1912. Its twin, Kelvin Technical High School, opened around the same time for students from the southern part of the city. With exteriors of Tyndall stone and red brick, the interior floor plans for the two schools were identical. The basement housed rooms for “technical” instruction in machining, woodworking, electrical work, mechanical drawing, and plumbing; dressing rooms for the gymnasium; the boiler room; four toilets; and two offices for teachers.

== History ==
- 1914, Many of the students and staff enlisted in fighting corps in World War I. A plaque at the school commemorates those who fought and died.
- 1925, The first Student Government in Canada was organized at St. John's by Mr. Reeve, the principal.
- 1926, The Torch, the school's first yearbook appeared, under the guidance of Mr. G. Snyder. This was the year that St. John's was converted into a Senior High School.
- 1935, “Jerusalem” was chosen as the school song.
- 1939, Cadet corps, Red Cross, and War Committees were organized at St. John's at the outbreak of World War II.
- 1945, A system of bars and awards was started.
- 1948, St. John's, at the Inter-High Track and Field Meet, won the highest number of points.
- 1952, With the opening of Tec Voc High School, St. John's changed almost completely to matriculation.
- 1955, St. John's won three of five awards given by Winnipeg High Schools.
- 1957, The tower was pulled down.
- 1959, This was a banner year in athletics, the Varsity team winning the City Basketball Championship, and the boys scoring the highest point totals in the Inter-High Track and Field Meet.
- 1961, The Junior Highs became part of the school, ending St. John's career as a Senior High School only.
- 1964, The completion of a second addition in September provided new facilities, like the French lab.
- 1967, With the demolition of the old building, St. John's was no longer the oldest school in Winnipeg.

== Legacy ==
To celebrate the school's hundredth anniversary in 2009–2010, the 100th Reunion Committee left a legacy to honour the past, present and future alumni of St. John's High School. The alumni wall display is located in the library and junior gym hallway. Proceeds were used to complete the wall, and profits were made available for school programs.

== Alumni ==
- Ernie Ahoff, football guard
- Burton Cummings, singer and songwriter
- Ed Evanko, actor and singer
- Harry Freedman, composer
- Jack Gallagher, oilman and head of Dome Petroleum
- Erving Goffman, sociologist
- Monty Hall, television and radio personality
- S. I. Hayakawa, politician and university administrator
- John Hirsch, theatre director
- Ken Kostick, chef and television and radio personality
- Morley Meredith
- Norman Mittelmann, opera singer
- John Paskievich
- Bert Pearl of The Happy Gang
- Arnold Spohr
- Louis Slotin
- David Steinberg
- Chris Walby
- Adele Wiseman
- Abe Yanofsky
- Avrom Yanovsky

== Sources and external links ==
- St. John's High School website: 100 Year Anniversary page
- "Torch" - St Johns High School Yearbooks 1943 - 45
- Manitoba Historical Society
