= Sisler High School =

Location
- 1360 Redwood Avenue; Winnipeg, Manitoba; Canada; 49°55′52.3″N 97°10′36.8″W

Information
- Type: Public secondary (French immersion, ESL, Adapted, Life Skills, and Accelerated programmes)
- Motto: Vincit qui se vincit (One conquers who conquers oneself)
- Established: 1957; 69 years ago
- School district: Winnipeg School Division
- Principal: Patricia Graham
- Enrollment: 1825
- Colours: Red and Black
- Mascot: Spartans
- Website: www.winnipegsd.ca/sisler

Sisler High School is the second largest high school in the province of Manitoba with over 1,800 students in grades 9-12. It was built in 1957 and is named after William James Sisler.

== Background ==
As principal of Strathcona School in the North End of Winnipeg, W.J. Sisler was instrumental in helping new immigrant families adjust. He faced a great challenge in the fact that a majority of the students did not speak English; there were twenty-two countries of origin and eighteen language groups in his student body. In addition, many of his students came from areas where they were deprived of their right to an education. In his book Peaceful Invasion, W.J. Sisler says, "Once they understood the value of education that was freely offered to them they took full advantage of all that we could give them". He adapted the education system for his immigrant students, and the provincial government of Manitoba soon officially adopted his method of teaching. Sisler High School today has a large ESL (English as a Second Language) program.

== Awards ==
Principal George Heshka, who has been principal of Sisler High School since 1980, has overseen the creation of various programs such as the All-Girl classes, the 24-Hour Exile, and the humanitarian groups of Sisler High School.

Chris Bandfield, social studies department head, won Manitoba's Lieutenant Governor's Classroom Teacher Award, of which only one is awarded annually at the secondary level.

In 2011, Sisler High School became one of 63 schools that were recognized by Microsoft as a Pathfinder School within the Innovative Schools Programme. This accomplishment allowed Sisler to send a group to Washington D.C. to present Sisler's innovative teaching practices around the world.

In March 2005, the school was recognized with the Canadians for a Genocide Museum Educator's Award for its contribution to education on issues surrounding genocide; specifically for its In Exile for a While programme. The school regards this to be a high honor, as it even edged out distinguished co-nominees—retired lieutenant-general, The Honourable Roméo Dallaire, and Inky Mark, member of parliament.

Sisler students have won the Harry Hood Memorial trophy twelve times. This trophy is awarded to student athletes who demonstrate outstanding scholastic and citizenship abilities. Sisler students have won this award more times than any other school in the province.

In 2002 Sisler High School's partnership with IBM was recognized with the "Conference Board of Canada RBC Royal Bank Partners in Education" Award.

January 2009 English Provincial Exam Results
	Provincial	Divisional	Sisler
English (4S and General)
Pass Rate: Mean:	84.7% 65.9%	81.4% 64.6%	92.2% 68.8%
Consumer Math
Pass Rate: Mean:	79.3% 62.3%	75.2% 60.3%	86.3% 64.6%
Applied Math
Pass Rate: Mean:	75.2% 61.0%	66.1% 57.1%	96.8% 73.5%
Pre-Calculus
Pass Rate: Mean:	77.2% 66.2%	75.2% 66.1%	94.6% 77.7%

== Accelerated Program ==
Sisler High School's Accelerated Program allows students to enroll in grade 9 and potentially finish their first year of university by the time they finish their grade 12 year. For the 2024–2025 school year, Sisler High School offers three university courses, in conjunction with the University of Winnipeg and the University of Manitoba. These courses include: Calculus 1, Calculus 2, and English. AP Chemistry, AP Physics, and AP Biology are also offered, as well as many other enriched courses.

== French Immersion Programme ==
The French Immersion Programme allows students to graduate with a French Immersion diploma, and full use of both official languages of Canada. Students enrolled in French Immersion are required to complete 14 credits of French-language courses. Two courses which are not offered in an English equivalent, and are therefore exclusive to French Immersion, are the Communications médiatiques (Media Communications) and Sciences humaines (Political History of the Twentieth Century).

The French Immersion Programme also has compulsory participation in the Canadian Parents for French (CPF) Concours d'art oratoire until the end of grade 10. The Concours d'art oratoire (Contest of the Oratory Art) is a French-language speaking contest in which participants write their own piece on a topic of their choice and perform it in public.

== Visual & performing arts department ==
Sisler High School's Visual & Performing Arts (VPA) Department offers courses in Art, Band (Jazz Band and Concert Band), Choir, Vocal Jazz Choir, Chamber Choir, and Concert Choir), Dance, and Drama.

In 2002–2004, 2006, 2008, and 2013, Sisler High School's choirs have won the Earl Grey Trophy, the highest honor for a school choir in the Winnipeg Music Festival.

On 18 October 2005, four members of Sisler High School's Chamber Choir joined the Winnipeg Boy's Choir to sing "O Canada" at the official welcoming ceremony of Governor General Michaëlle Jean at the Legislative Assembly of Manitoba.

The Sisler's Most Wanted dance troupe has its origins as an all-male dance troupe aimed at preventing crime and has since then grown into a male and female troupe.

On 8 October 2002, Sisler High School's Jazz-Ma-Tazz ensemble and Sisler's Most Wanted dance troupe performed for the Queen of Canada, Elizabeth II, during her visit to Winnipeg as a part of the Golden Jubilee festivities at The Forks.

== Athletics ==
Sisler High School also offers sports such as track, hockey, football, darts, rugby, volleyball, soccer and basketball, cricket, curling, and golf.

== Generation Peace ==
Generation Peace was founded in 2000. They mainly work with war-affected children through "War Child Canada", holding fundraisers for this organization. They have worked with Tsunami relief, Hurricane Katrina relief and Christmas Cheerboard and with the Manitoba Council for International Cooperation to present conferences. Funds and events include:

- OverSeas Educational Fund (OSEF) was created in 2003. Ultimately, OSEF raises funds and awareness for education overseas. They raise funds to support daycares in the Philippines through International Association for Transformation (IAT) as well as the Village of Hope initiative in Zambia.
- The In Exile Program., which simulates a refugee experience.
- The 30 Hour Famine, an annual schoolwide event that raises money for famished and underprivileged children overseas.
- S.O.S.E.H. The Students of Sisler Environmental Helpers is a program that attempts to reduce Sisler's carbon footprint and improve the school's sustainability.
- Global Medical Aid, raises funds to provide medical supplies to people in third world countries.

== Student groups ==
Other extracurricular activities are offered at Sisler.

=== Robotics team ===
In 2003, the rookie Sisler robotic team entered the Canada FIRST Robotics Competition. The team won the "President's Cup" for finishing first place overall, including second place in the robot hockey competition.

== Notable alumni ==
- Lloyd Axworthy, former Canadian minister of foreign affairs
- Priyanka Dhillon, boxer
- Gary Filmon, former premier of Manitoba
- Martin Riley (basketball), basketball player
- Louriza Tronco, actress.
