= Anna May Waters =

Canadian nurse

- Waters on her release from captivity, 6 December 1943
- Born: 21 January 1903; Strathroy, Ontario, Canada
- Died: 8 December 1987 (aged 84); Long Beach, California, United States
- Military career
- Allegiance: Canada
- Branch: Canadian Army
- Service years: 1940–1946
- Rank: Lieutenant
- Unit: Royal Canadian Army Medical Corps
- Conflicts: Second World War
- Awards: Associate Royal Red Cross

Anna May Waters, ARRC (21 January 1903 – 8 December 1987) was a Canadian nurse who served in the Second World War. Taken as a prisoner of war during the Japanese occupation of Hong Kong, she remained in captivity for fourteen months. Upon her release, Waters returned to Canada and was honoured with the Associate Royal Red Cross. After her service in Canada, Waters moved to Hawaii, spending over a decade nursing lepers at Molokai.

== Early life ==
Anna May Waters, known as May, was born on 21 January 1903, in Strathroy, Ontario, to Mary (née McDonald) and David Waters. When she was eight years old, she moved with her parents and three brothers to Winnipeg, Manitoba. She was educated at Lord Roberts School and Kelvin High School, before entering nursing training. In 1927, Waters graduated from Winnipeg General Hospital as a registered nurse.

== Nursing career ==
Waters began nursing in December 1927 at the Manitoba Tuberculosis Sanatorium in Ninette and remained there for two years. She then went to work in the Central Tuberculosis Clinic in Manitoba. In 1940, following the outbreak of the Second World War, she enlisted in the Royal Canadian Army Medical Corps (RCAMC) and was appointed as the nursing-sister-in-charge of the Fort Osborne Military Hospital. On 27 October 1941, she became one of the first two Canadian nurses to serve in an operational area during the war, when she and Kathleen Christie sailed aboard the HMT Awatea for Hong Kong with the Winnipeg Grenadiers. After stops in Honolulu and Manila the ship arrived in Kong Kong on 16 November. She was assigned to the malaria and dysentery wards of the hospital.

On 8 December 1941, when war was declared in the Pacific, the nurses moved to St. Albert's Convent. Within three days, they had established an Auxiliary Military Hospital at the convent and relocated all patients there. That same day, the first bombing of Hong Kong occurred, with the hospital taking seventeen direct hits. On Christmas Eve, rumours circulated that the colony had unconditionally surrendered to the Japanese forces and on Christmas Day the Japanese occupation of Hong Kong began. On 19 December, the St. Albert's Military Hospital was taken over by the Japanese. Though they were prisoners of war, the sisters continued to care for the patients under their charge until they were sent to Stanley Internment Camp in August 1942. After fourteen months of captivity, Waters was repatriated to Canada in 1943.

Waters recuperated with her family for several months, trying to gain back the weight she had lost during her internment. She was awarded the Associate Royal Red Cross on 6 April 1944, by Brigadier J. C. Stewart, commanding officer of military district 6. On 5 September 1945, she was shipped out to rejoin her unit as part of the staff on the TSS Letitia, and was briefly reunited with some of her fellow former prisoners of war in Hawaii in October. She served on the Letitia, a hospital ship operating in the Atlantic and Pacific war theatres, until August 1946.

When she was discharged from the RCAMC, Waters returned to Winnipeg and remained until September 1950, when she went to work at the Oregon State Tuberculosis Hospital in Salem, Oregon. After serving for a year, she moved to Honolulu to work at the Leahi Hospital for tubercular patients. In October 1952, she returned to Manitoba to care for her ailing father, who died in 1955. In April 1956, Waters returned to Hawaii, where she nursed on the island of Molokai at the Kalaupapa Leprosy Settlement. In 1968 Waters retired and moved to Long Beach, California, where one of her brothers was living.

== Death and legacy ==
Waters died on 8 December 1987 in Long Beach, California, and was buried in Westminster Memorial Park cemetery on 12 December 1987.
