= Richard Bonelli =

American operatic baritone

- Bonelli, 1940s
- Born: George Richard Bunn; 6 February 1889; Port Byron, New York; United States
- Died: 7 June 1980 (aged 91); Los Angeles, California; United States
- Occupation: Opera singer (baritone)
- Years active: 1915-1970s
- Spouses: Pauline Cornélys (m. 1917, divorced) Mona Chapman Wood (m. 1933)

Richard Bonelli (born George Richard Bunn; 6 February 1889 – 7 June 1980) was an American operatic baritone active from 1915 to the late 1970s. Although he sang predominantly on stage in both light and grand operas, he also performed at various times on radio, in concerts and films, as well as on television.

== Early life and training ==
Bonelli was the child of Ida (née Homel) and Martin Bunn of Port Byron, New York. His family later moved to Syracuse and soon George preferred to be called Richard. Prior to deciding on a career in music, Bonelli was a friend of race car driver and later mayor of Salt Lake City, Ab Jenkins. Bonelli attended Syracuse University, initially studying engineering, but the quality of his singing voice altered those early academic pursuits. He soon began actively training with voice teachers, including Arthur Alexander in Los Angeles and with Jean de Reszke and William Valonat in Europe. He also studied singing with Sidney Dietch.

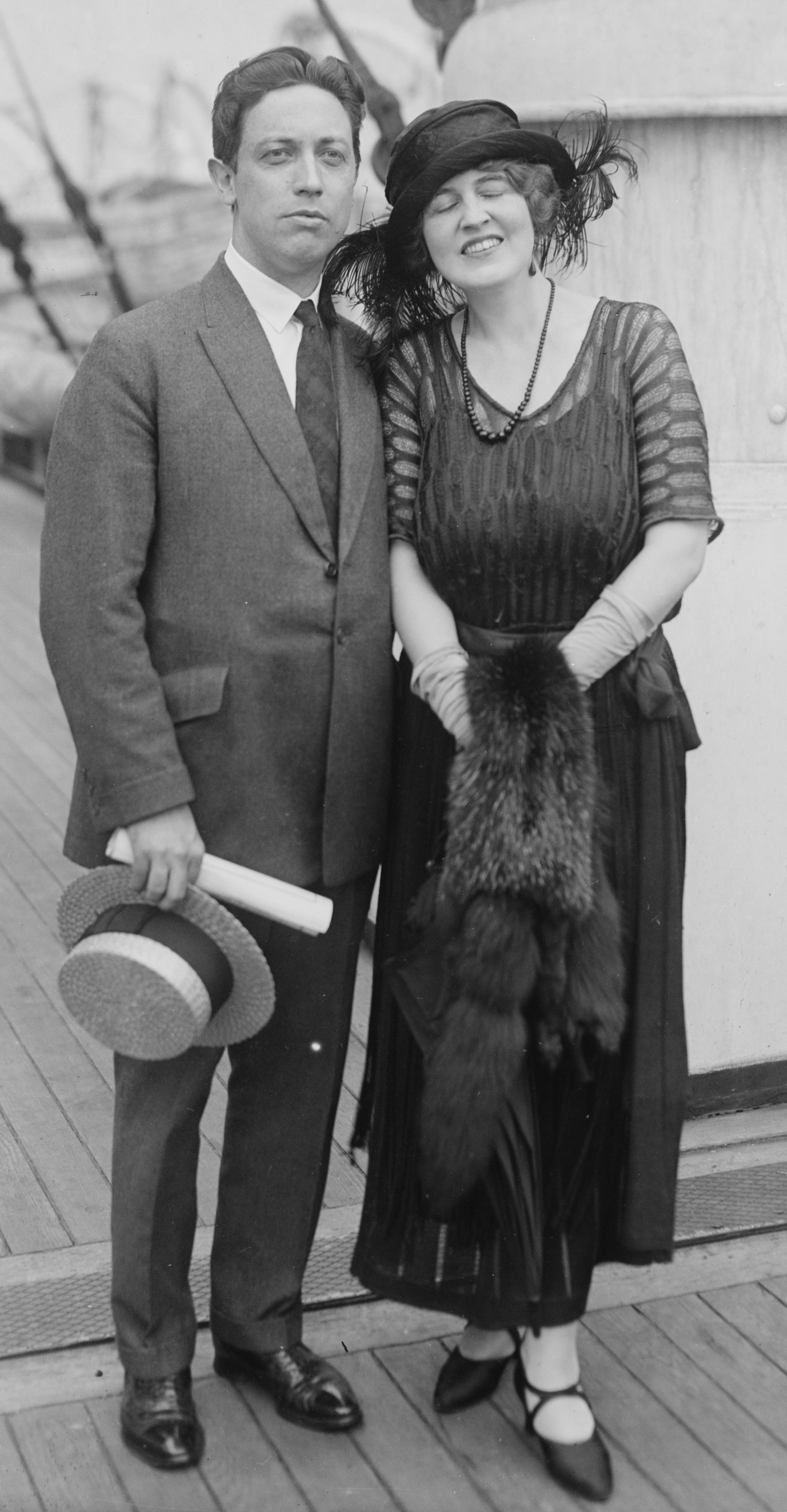
Bonelli with his first wife, soprano Pauline Cornélys, aboard ship during singing tours to Europe, 1923-1924

== Career ==
Bonelli's operatic debut came on 21 April 1915 at the Brooklyn Academy of Music as Valentin in Gounod's Faust. He toured with the San Carlo Opera Company between 1922 and 1924. In 1923 he made his European debut as Dardano in Catalani's Dejanice during the Carnevale season in Modena, Italy. He returned to Europe in 1924 to sing at the Monte Carlo Opera and was eventually engaged by the Théâtre de la Gaîté in Paris. Between 1925 and 1931 Bonelli performed with the Chicago Opera Company and between 1926 and 1942 frequently performed at the San Francisco Opera. His Chicago debut in 1925 was in the role of Germont in Verdi's La traviata with Claudia Muzio (Violetta) and Antonio Cortis (Alfredo). His debut role in San Francisco was Figaro in Rossini's Il barbiere di Siviglia, after appearing in Flotow's Martha at the Los Angeles Grand Opera earlier in September 1926.

Seizing the opportunity of a one-year collapse of Chicago Civic Opera, the Met impresario Giulio Gatti-Casazza quickly engaged Bonelli for leading baritone roles in New York. His first performance with the Metropolitan Opera was on 29 November 1932, again as Rossini's Figaro, at the company's tour to Philadelphia. (It was also the role for his last Met stage performance on 14 March 1945.) The cast included Lily Pons (Rosina), Tito Schipa (Count Almaviva), and Ezio Pinza (Don Basilio). Bonelli's New York Metropolitan Opera debut came on 1 December 1932 as Giorgio Germont in Verdi's La traviata opposite Rosa Ponselle as Violetta and Tito Schipa as Alfredo. He remained on the Met's active roster until 1945, making his final performance as Rossini's Figaro on 14 March that year. He was the Tonio in the first ever live telecast of opera, from the Met on 10 March 1940 alongside Hilda Burke and Armand Tokatyan. He returned to the Met in 1966 as an honored guest at the 'Gala Farewell' marking the last performance by the Metropolitan Opera in the old opera house at Broadway and 39th Street, before moving to the Lincoln Center.

Of his many roles, Bonelli was known best for his Verdi repertory as Giorgio Germont, Di Luna, Renato, Rigoletto and Amonasro, and also for his portrayals of Valentin in Gounod's Faust, Wolfram in Wagner's Tannhäuser, Tonio in Leoncavallo's Pagliacci, Rossini's Figaro, Enrico Ashton in Donizetti's Lucia and Sharpless in Puccini's Madama Butterfly. In Italy, he performed under the name Riccardo Bonelli. He appears in at least three surviving films: as the "Eminent Baritone" in a 1928 short, one of Fox Studio's earliest sound films, in which he performs "Largo Al Factotum" from The Barber of Seville; in the 1935 feature Enter Madame; and in a cameo appearance in the 1941 feature The Hard-Boiled Canary.

== Retirement and legacy ==
After retiring from singing, Bonelli became a successful voice teacher at the Curtis Institute of Music in Philadelphia, the Music Academy of the West in Montecito, and in New York. Among his students were Frank Guarrera, Enrico Di Giuseppe, Lucine Amara, and Norman Mittelmann. In 1949 when Edward Johnson retired from his position of general manager of the Metropolitan Opera, Bonelli was a contender for the job though it ultimately went to Rudolf Bing. Bonelli's favorite baritone was Titta Ruffo. American baritone Robert Merrill had stated that Bonelli was his inspiration to study singing, after hearing him perform the Count di Luna at the Met alongside Giovanni Martinelli and Elisabeth Rethberg in 1936. Even after retiring from teaching, he periodically performed on stage into his 80s. His later appearances were more on the West Coast of the United States.

== Personal life and death ==
Bonelli, who was the uncle of actor Robert Stack, married twice, the first time to opera singer Pauline Cornélys. They wed in Boston, Massachusetts in 1917 and divorced in 1933. Later that year, in October, Bonelli married Mona Chapman Wood, and the couple remained together until Richard's death.

On 7 June 1980, shortly after Bonelli's wife Mona donated his recorded performances to Stanford University's Archive of Recorded Sound, he died at age 91 in Los Angeles, California. His body was cremated, and the ashes were placed in Niche 32072 in the Columbarium of Victory at Forest Lawn Memorial Park in Glendale, California.
