= Winnipeg School Division =

Public school district in Manitoba, Canada

Location
- 1577 Wall Street East, Winnipeg, Manitoba Canada
- Coordinates: 49.900°N 97.168°W

District information
- Grades: N-12
- Established: 1877
- Chief Superintendent: Matthew Henderson (2023)
- School board: Board of Trustees
- Chair of the board: Tamara Kuly (2023-2024)
- Schools: 78
- Budget: $421 m CAD (2021/22)

Students and staff
- Students: 33,000
- Teachers: 2,500
- Staff: 6,000

Other information
- Website: www.winnipegsd.ca

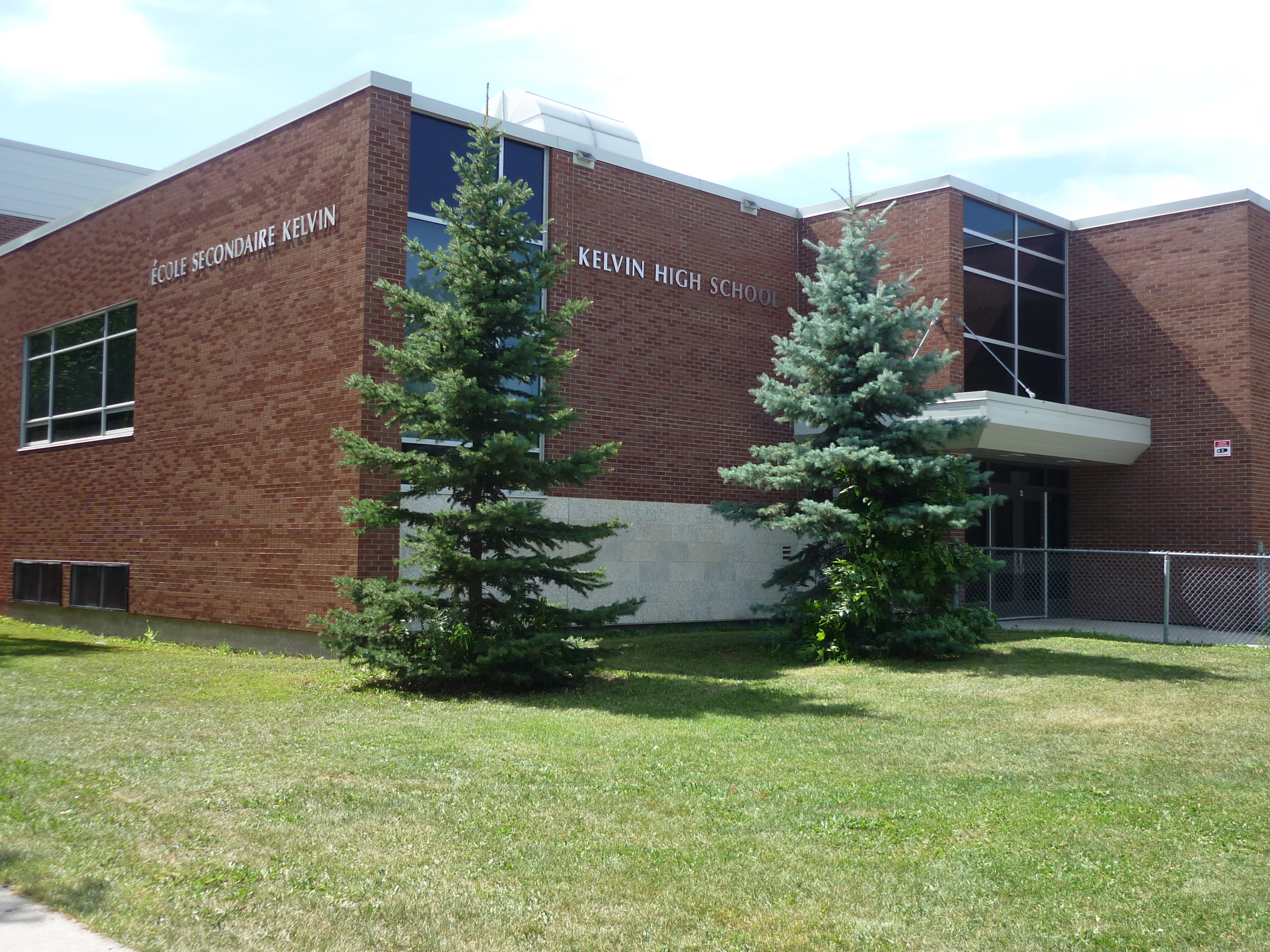
Kelvin High School, a high school in the South District

The Winnipeg School Division is a school division in Winnipeg, Manitoba. With 78 schools, it is the largest of six public school divisions in Winnipeg, as well as the largest and oldest school division in Manitoba.

Its schools collectively teach over 33,000 students, in central, pre-unicity Winnipeg.

== Current schools ==
There are currently 78 schools in the Winnipeg School Division.

=== Elementary schools ===
Elementary schools include those from preschool to grade 6.

School	Notes
Brock Corydon	
Carpathia	
Champlain	
Clifton	
Dufferin	
Faraday	
Fort Rouge	
Garden Grove	
George V	
Gladstone	
Glenelm	
Greenway	Built at a cost of $88,000 in 1910 at 850 St. Matthews Avenue. This School was the first of three schools with this name, and at the time was the largest in Winnipeg, built to hold 1000 students. In 1919, a second one-storey "bungalow style" building with eight more classrooms was erected nearby. Those two buildings remained until 1997 when they were demolished. The current Greenway school is located at 390 Burnell Street.
Grosvenor	
Harrow	
Inkster	
J.B. Mitchell	
John M. King	
Kent Road	
King Edward	
Laura Secord	
LaVérendrye	
Lord Nelson	
Lord Roberts	
Lord Selkirk	
Luxton	
Machray	
Montrose	
Mulvey	
Pinkham	
Prairie Rose	
Principal Sparling	
Queenston	
River Elm	
Riverview	
Robert H. Smith	
Robertson	
Rockwood	
Sister MacNamara	
Strathcona	
Tyndall Park	
Victoria-Albert	Operates an off-campus Grade 4-6 classroom named Wi Wabigooni (located in downtown Winnipeg, hosted by Rossbrook House).
Wellington	
Weston	
Wolseley	

=== Middle school and mixed-grade schools ===
These are middle schools (aka junior high), or a combination of elementary and middle school (typically preschool to grade 9) or middle to high school (typically grades 7 to 12).

School	Type	Grades	Notes
Keewatin Prairie Community	elementary and middle school	N-9	
David Livingstone	elementary and middle school	N-8	
Earl Grey	elementary and middle school	N-8	
Isaac Brock	elementary and middle school	N-9	
Lansdowne	elementary and middle school	N-8	
Meadows West	elementary and middle school	N-8	
Niji Mahkwa	elementary and middle school	N-8	
Norquay School	elementary and middle school	N-8	
Ralph Brown	elementary and middle school	N-8	
Sacre-Coeur	elementary and middle school	N-9	
Sargent Park	elementary and middle school	N-9	
Shaughnessy Park	elementary and middle school	N-8	
Stanley Knowles	elementary and middle school	N-8	
Waterford Springs	elementary and middle school	N-8	
William Whyte	elementary and middle school	N-8	
Andrew Mynarski V.C.	middle	7-9	
General Wolfe	middle	7-9	
Hugh John Macdonald	middle	7-9	Operates an off-campus Grade 7-9 program named Eagles' Circle (located in Rossbrook House (658 Ross Avenue)).
Isaac Newton	middle	7-9	
River Heights	middle	7-8	
Churchill	middle and high school	7-12	
Collège Churchill	middle and high school	7-12	
Elmwood	middle and high school	7-12	
Gordon Bell	middle and high school	7-12	Operates an off-campus Grade 9-12 program named Rising Sun (located at 429 Elgin Avenue, hosted by Rossbrook House).
Grant Park	middle and high school	7-12	
St. John's	middle and high school	7-12	
WSD Virtual School	kindergarten to high school	K-12	

=== High school and adult learning ===
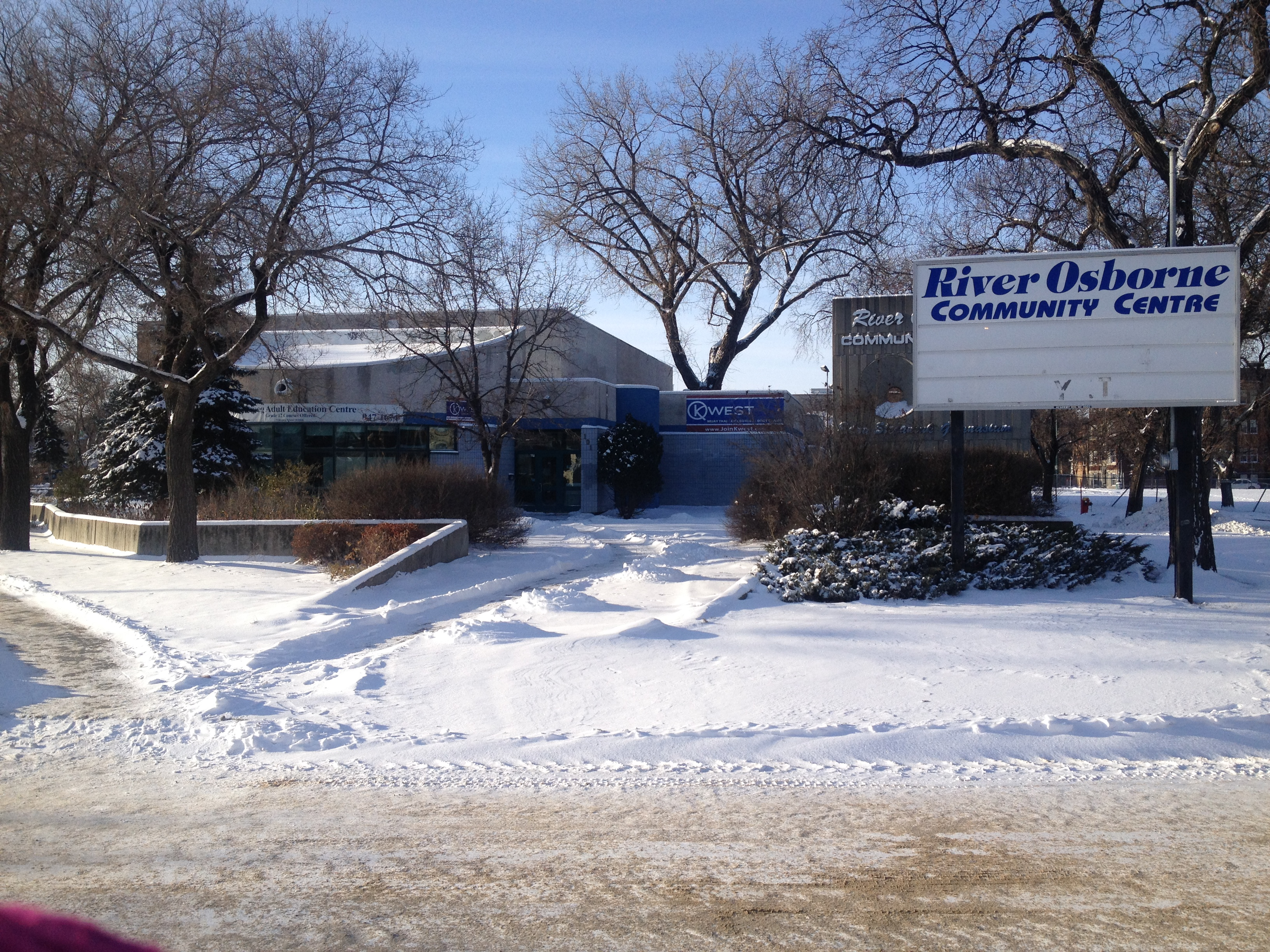
The River Osborne Community Centre houses the satellite program of the Winnipeg Adult Education Centre.

School	Type	Grades
Adolescent Parent Centre	High	9-12
Argyle Alternative	High	10-12
Children of the Earth	High	9-12
Daniel McIntyre Collegiate	High	9-12
Elmwood High School	High	7-12
Kelvin High School	High	9-12
R. B. Russell Vocational	High (vocational)	9-12
Sisler High School	High	9-12
Technical Vocational	High (vocational)	9-12
Winnipeg Adult Education Centre	Adult learning	12

== French-immersion programs ==
French-immersion programs are taught in either:

- "milieu" schools, where French immersion is the only program taught in the school, and immersion starts at the Nursery level; or
- dual track schools, where both English and immersion programs are taught in the same school and immersion starts at Kindergarten.

The immersion program option is offered in the following schools:

School	French Program	Grades
École Garden Grove School	Dual-Track	N-6
École George V School	Dual-Track	N-7
École J.B. Mitchell School	Dual-Track	N-6
École secondaire Kelvin High School	Dual-Track	9-12
École Laura Secord School	Dual-Track	N-6
École River Heights School	Dual-Track	7-8
École Riverview School	Dual-Track	N-6
École Robert H. Smith School	Dual-Track	N-6
École Sisler High School	Dual-Track	9-12
École Stanley Knowles School	Dual-Track	N-8
École Victoria-Albert School	Dual-Track	K
École Waterford Springs School	Dual-Track	N-8
École Lansdowne	Milieu	N-8
École LaVérendrye	Milieu	N-6
École Sacré-Coeur	Milieu	N-8
Collège Churchill	Milieu	7-12

== Former schools ==
School	Location	Demolished
Alexandra School	Edmonton Street	1969
Argyle School (moved)	Louise Street	1940s
Carlton School	Graham Avenue	1903
Margaret Scott School	Alfred Avenue	1990
Somerset School	775 Sherbrook Street	2005
Strathcona School (moved)	McGregor Street	1963-1964
Winnipeg Collegiate Institute	Bannatyne Avenue	1928

== Governance ==
Policies regarding the provision of educational services in WSD are the responsibility of the Board of Trustees of the Winnipeg School Division. The Winnipeg School Division comprises nine wards, each having one elected trustee, who are elected for a four-year term.

On October 26, 2022, the following trustees were elected into office:

- Jamie Dumont — Ward 1
- Lois Brothers — Ward 2
- Kathy Heppner (Chair) — Ward 3
- Rebecca Chambers — Ward 4
- Dante Aviso (Vice-chair) — Ward 5
- Perla Javate — Ward 6
- Tamara Kuly — Ward 7
- Betty Edel — Ward 8
- Ann Evangelista — Ward 9

== See also ==
- List of school districts in Manitoba
- Daniel McIntyre
