= Kelvin High School =

High school in Winnipeg, Manitoba

École Secondaire Kelvin High School

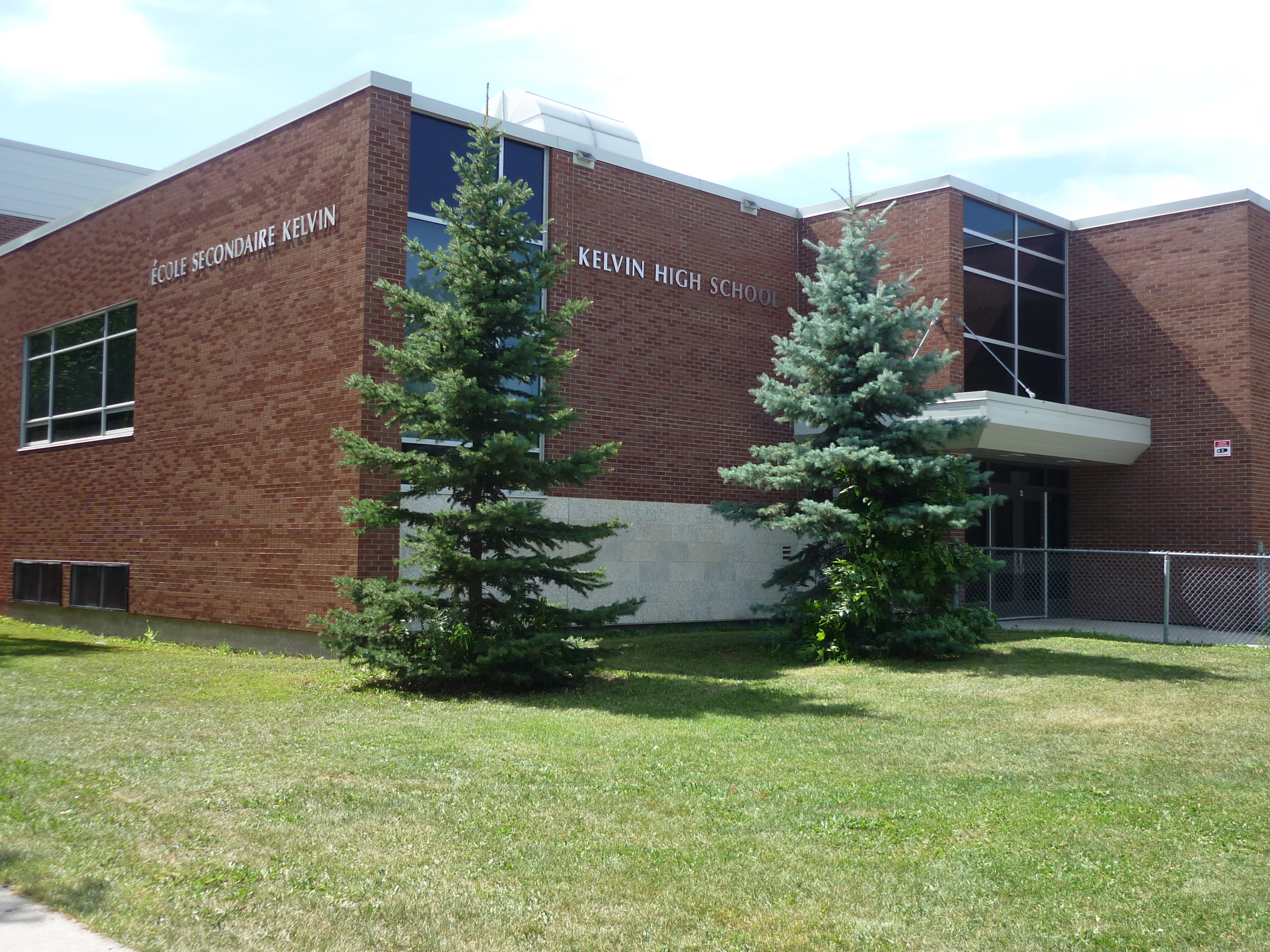
- View of Kelvin High School from Strafford St and Kingsway

Location
- 155 Kingsway Avenue; Winnipeg, Manitoba, R3M 0G3; Canada; 49°52′23″N 97°10′3″W

Information
- School type: Public, High School
- Motto: "Courage, Truth, Right"
- Founded: 1912; 114 years ago
- School district: Winnipeg School Division
- Superintendent: Matt Henderson
- Principal: Timothy Cox
- Grades: 9-12
- Enrollment: 1350 (2024)
- Language: English and French immersion
- Area: South Central Winnipeg (River Heights, Fort Rouge, Crescentwood)
- Colours: Cherry and Grey
- Mascot: The Clipper Ship
- Team name: Kelvin Clippers
- Feeder schools: River Heights; Gordon Bell
- Website: www.winnipegsd.ca/schools/Kelvin/Pages/default.aspx

Kelvin High School is a public high school in Winnipeg, Manitoba, Canada. The school is located in the neighbourhood of River Heights. Kelvin teaches grades 9 to 12 and is part of the South District of the Winnipeg School Division.

== History ==
The school was founded in 1912 as Kelvin Technical High School. The name was later changed to Kelvin High School, because of the increasingly academic focus of the school and the shift in the term "technical" in an educational sense. The school is named after the mathematical physicist and engineer William Thomson, 1st Baron Kelvin.

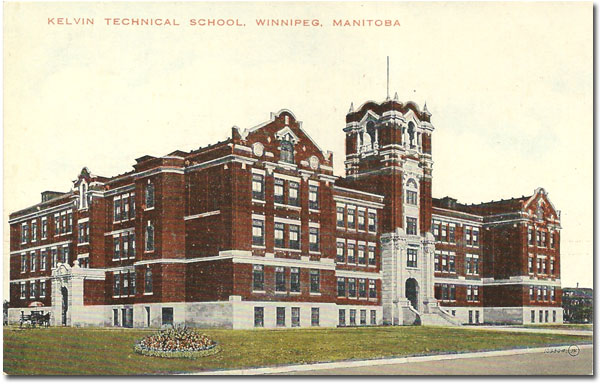
Kelvin Technical High School c. 1912

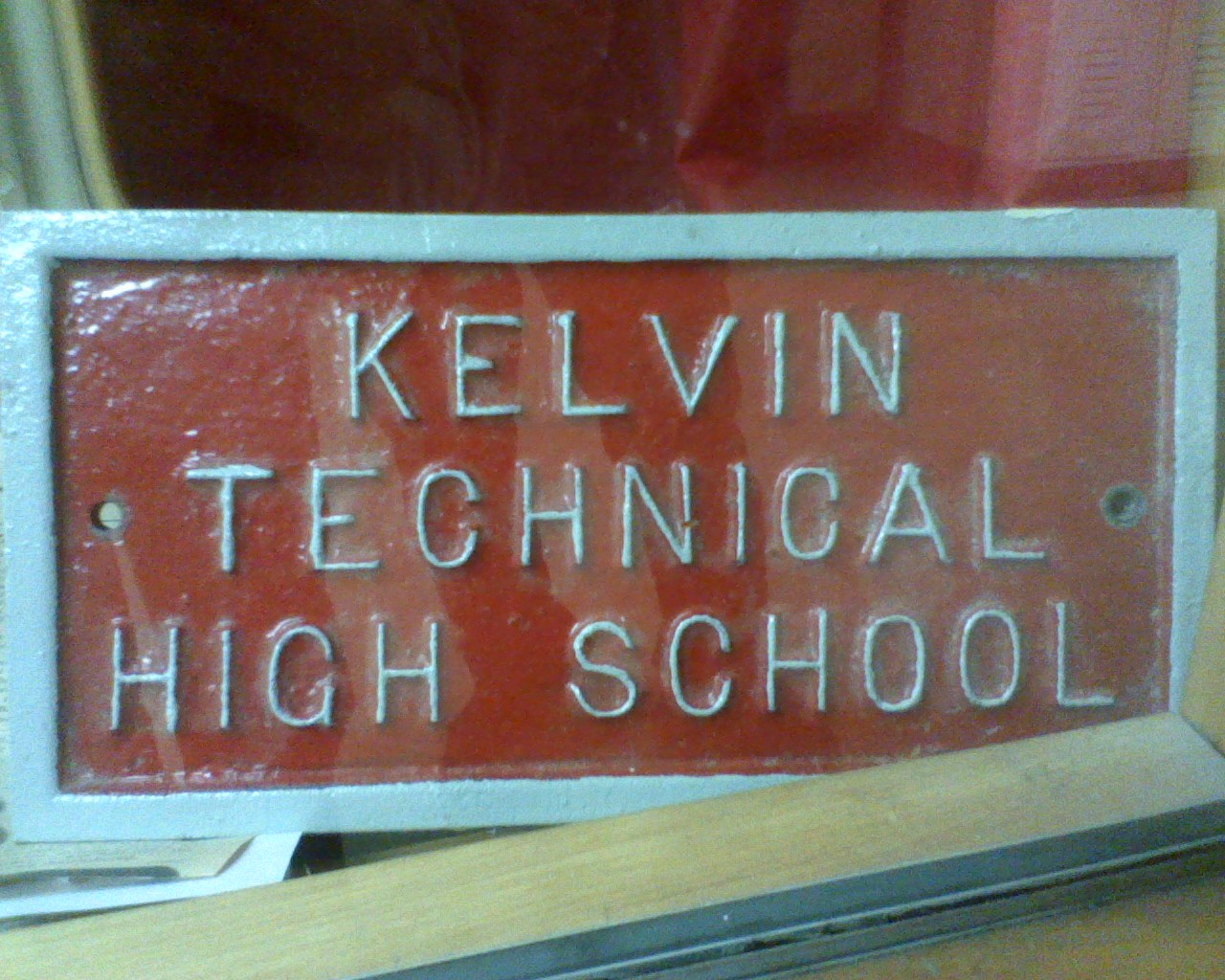
A metal plate that appeared on the original Kelvin Technical High School.

Many Kelvin High School students fought in World War II. More than fifty were killed in battle. This inspired the 2005 documentary, The Boys of Kelvin High: Canadians in Bomber Command, which was produced by Clifford Chadderton, a distinguished Canadian Forces infantry commander and Kelvin High School alumnus.

The original 1912 school building was replaced by the current one in 1964. The French Immersion Program was introduced to the school in 1978 and the International Baccalaureate Program was introduced in 1981. In the 1991-92 school year, the Kelvin High School Charter of Rights and Responsibilities, which contains the rights of those who attend Kelvin, was ratified by the students.

During the mid-1990s, Kelvin underwent some changes in its academic structure. Originally, the school taught only grades 10-12. Grade 9 was added at the beginning of the 1995-96 school year, which significantly increased the student population. As per Department of Education guidelines, special education students were also integrated in that year. In the 1996-97 school year, Kelvin High School introduced semesters into its schedule.

An addition, which includes two art rooms, two classrooms, and a computer lab, was constructed in 2002-03. Other minor construction projects were also completed in that year. A second gym for the school is listed as the Winnipeg School Division's top priority. The goal of constructing a second gym has been partially achieved with the creation of the 'Active Living Centre.'

== Academics ==
In addition to a standard high school curriculum, Kelvin High School offers a French Immersion Program for grades 9-12, as well as the IB Program for grades 10-12. Kelvin offers a variety of courses which include Mathematics (Pre-Calculus, Applied, Essentials, and Introductory Calculus), English, Health, Social Studies, Geography, History, Chemistry, Physics, Art, Band, Choir, Drama, Digital Animation Studio, Graphics, Foods and Nutrition, Clothing and Design, Woodworking, and Computer Science.

== Athletics ==
Many students at Kelvin participate in or support the athletic teams. The sports that are offered are Cross Country, Football, Rowing, Ultimate, Volleyball, Waterpolo, Hockey, Wrestling, Cheerleading, Basketball, Darts, Curling, Table Tennis, Badminton, Golf, Outdoor Track, Indoor Track, Rugby, Soccer, and Team Handball. The school has an athletic banquet near the end of every school year to give out awards for achievement in athletics.

The school mascot is the Clipper Ship. Students are colloquially known as 'Clippers'.

The sports teams have rivalries with Sisler High School, Grant Park, Oak Park, and St. Paul's.

== Causes ==
The Kelvin Causes Committee has raised hundreds of dollars for War Affected Children in Uganda. S.E.E.D.S. (Students for Ethical Environmental Development and Sustainability) launched a school-wide composting program and has plans to develop a green roof, wind generator and solar panels to reduce Kelvin's carbon footprint. As well as Kelvin's annual Holiday Breakfast, hosting an inner city elementary school each year for a day filled with games, presents, yummy food while spending time with Kelvin High school students.

In addition, the school has a student group called HASTA (Hopeful Aware Students Taking Action), which organizes events and raises money and awareness for different global issues.

== Notable alumni ==
List of notable alumni of Kelvin High School:

- Gail Asper, business and community leader, human rights advocate
- Izzy Asper, lawyer, businessman, founder of CanWest Global (1950)
- G. Michael Bancroft, chemist, synchrotron scientist (1957)
- Clifford Chadderton, CEO of The War Amps
- Scott Coe, professional football player (1998)
- Richard Condie, animator, filmmaker, musician (1961)
- Andrew Coyne, journalist, editor of Maclean's (1978)
- Jimmy Dunn, sports executive and Hockey Hall of Fame inductee
- Ken Finkleman, writer, director, actor, filmmaker (1964)
- Charles Goodeve, scientist and pioneer in operations research (1919)
- Allan Gotlieb, ambassador to the United States (1946)
- Ben Hatskin, founder of the Winnipeg Jets
- David Hewson, professional football player
- Jay Ingram, CM, science journalist, author, broadcaster
- Michaele Jordana, artist (1965)
- Mike Keane, former NHL hockey player (1985)
- Grant Ledyard, former NHL hockey player (1979)
- Kevin McCarthy, former NHL hockey player (1975)
- Marshall McLuhan, author, philosopher, scholar, media theorist (1928)
- Maggie Morris, CBC radio and television personality (1943)
- Don Oramasionwu, professional football player (2004)
- Gordon Orlikow (b. 1960), decathlon, heptathlon, and hurdles competitor, Athletics Canada Chairman, Canadian Olympic Committee member, Korn/Ferry International partner
- Fred Penner, children's entertainer (1965)
- Julie Penner, violinist, music producer for CBC Radio's The Vinyl Café
- Cliff Pennington, NHL hockey player (1956)
- Douglas Rain, actor (1946)
- Raziel Reid, author
- Dufferin Roblin, Premier of Manitoba (1958–67)
- John K. Samson, musician (1991)
- Arthur Schafer, ethicist at the University of Manitoba
- Gerald Schwartz, businessman, founder and CEO of Onex Corporation
- Glen Scrivener, former professional football player (1985)
- Eddie Steele, professional football player
- Shirley Tilghman, president of Princeton University
- Ray Turnbull, curling broadcaster (1957)
- Anna May Waters, nurse
- Mel Wilson, CFL Grey Cup champion
- Neil Young, musician
