= Martin Riley (basketball) =

Canadian basketball player (born 1955)

Personal information
- Born: April 23, 1954 (age 72) Winnipeg, Manitoba, Canada
- Listed height: 5 ft 11 in (1.80 m)

Career information
- High school: Sisler High School (Winnipeg, Manitoba)
- College: University of Manitoba (1973–1978)
- Position: Point guard
- Number: 5

Career history

Playing
- 1980-81: River Plate (Argentina)

Coaching
- 1981-1984: University of Manitoba

Career highlights
- CIAU Player of the Year (1976); 3x CIAU First-team All-Canadian (1976, 1977, 1988); Manitoba Athlete of the Year (1976); CIAU Tournament MVP (1976); 2x CIAU Tournament All-Star (1975, 1976); CIAU Tournament Champion (1976); Great Plains Athletic Conference (GPAC) Player of the Year (1978); (GPAC) First-team All-star (1977, 1978)

Martin James Riley (born May 8, 1955) is a former Canadian basketball player and Olympian. Riley has been described as “one of the finest basketball players to emerge out of the province of Manitoba”.

Riley played for the Canadian men's national basketball team from 1973 to 1980. Riley made the national team when he was 17 years old, being the first player to make the national team immediately out of high school and being one of the only 17-year-olds in history to make the Canadian national basketball team. Riley was later named the captain of the 1980 Olympic team.

Riley also had a successful career at the University of Manitoba. He was the CIAU Player of the Year in the 1975–76 season, a three-time First-team All-Canadian (1976-1978), Manitoba's athlete of the year (1976) a CIAU national tournament champion (1976), CIAU tournament MVP (1976) and Great Plains Athletic Conference player of the year (1978), among other accomplishments.

== International career ==
Riley represented Canada on their national men's basketball team from 1973 to 1980. Riley made the Canadian national team immediately out of high school as a 17-year-old. He was the first player to earn a spot on the Canadian men's national basketball team immediately out of high school and one of the few 17-year-olds to ever make the Canadian men's national basketball team.

Riley represented Canada in the 1976 Olympics where Canada finished fourth overall. This was one of only three times in history in which Canada has competed for an Olympic medal in men's basketball. Riley was Canada's fifth overall scorer in these Olympic games.

Canada qualified for the 1980 Moscow Olympics, with Riley being selected as captain of the team. However, Riley and his teammates unfortunately did not compete in these games seeing that Canada boycotted these Olympics as a result of the Soviet Union's 1979 invasion of Afghanistan. This 1980 Canadian Olympic team was positioned to be a medal-contender given that Canada competed for the bronze medal in the Olympic games preceding and following these 1980 Olympics (1976, 1984), with this time of Canadian basketball being described as "arguably the Canadian national team's greatest era" and "Canada's golden age of basketball".

Riley was also offered a place on the 1984 Olympic team; however, seeing that taking the offer would have resulted in him losing his head coaching position at the University of Manitoba, Riley declined.

Riley represented Canada in many international tournaments, including the 1974 and 1978 FIBA World Championships, 1975 and 1979 Pan American Games and 1977 and 1979 World University Games. Riley performed well in these tournaments; for example, Riley was Canada's second-leading scorer in the 1978 FIBA World Championship, where Canada finished 6th overall.

== University ==
Before attending university, Riley was the point guard and captain of the Sisler High School basketball team in Winnipeg during the 1972–73 season. He and his teammates achieved a perfect 35–0 record and won the province's 4A title that year. This team was the only undefeated varsity boys basketball teams in Manitoba for several decades. This year, Riley also was awarded the Carl Ridd award for excellence in academics and basketball.

Riley played for the University of Manitoba Bisons from 1973 to 1978. He was the CIAU Player of the Year in the 1975–76 season, a First-team All-Canadian in the 1975–76, 1976–77 and 1977–78 seasons, and Manitoba's athlete of the year in the 1975–76 season.

He and his teammates won the CIAU national championship in 1976, defeating St. Mary's 82–69 in the national final game. Riley was named the CIAU tournament MVP this year. This was the Bison's first and only national title in program history. This was a satisfying win for the Bisons after losing in the CIAU national finals game by one point the prior season. Overall, the Bisons played in the CIAU national tournament four of Riley's five seasons at the university.

Additionally, Riley was a CIAU national tournament all-star in the 1974–75 and 1975–76 seasons, the Great Plains Athletic Conference (GPAC) player of the year in the 1977–78 season and a GPAC first-team all-star in the 1976–77 and 1977–78 seasons.

== Professional / Semi-Pro ==
After graduating from the University of Manitoba in 1978, Riley played in Canada's Senior Men's Basketball league with the team Nicolett Inn, where he and his teammates won the national senior title in 1979 and 1980. Riley completed his playing career in the 1980–81 season after playing professionally in Argentina for the team River Plate.

== Coaching career ==
Riley was the head coach of the men's basketball team at the University of Manitoba from 1981 to 1984. Riley has also been head coach at the high school level, including at Churchill High School, Dakota Collegiate and Miles Mac Collegiate. At Miles Mac, Riley led the program to two provincial championships. Riley also started the Winnipeg Wolves basketball club in 2006, a basketball program for high school athletes, and has led the Wolves' girls' program.

== Post-career Awards ==
Riley has been inducted into the Canada Basketball Hall of Fame (1995); the Manitoba Sports Hall of Fame (1991); the Canada West Hall of Fame in their first induction class (2020–21); the Manitoba Basketball Hall of Fame (1996); and the Manitoba High Schools Athletic Association Hall of Fame (2001).

Further, the 1976 Canadian men's national team was inducted into the Canadian Basketball Hall of Fame (2007); the 1976 University of Manitoba men's basketball team was inducted into the Manitoba Sports Hall of Fame (2011); the 1979 and 1980 Nicolett teams from the Canadian senior men's league were inducted into the Manitoba Basketball Hall of Fame (2003); and the 1973 Sisler boys basketball team was inducted into the Manitoba High Schools Athletic Association Hall of Fame (2011), with Riley being a member of each of these teams.

== Personal life ==
Riley was born May 8, 1955, in Winnipeg, Manitoba. He was raised in Winnipeg as one of five children raised by his single mother. Riley eventually became a high school teacher, teaching psychology, law and geography at the high school level.
