= North Point Douglas =

Neighbourhood in Winnipeg, Manitoba, Canada

Coordinates: 49°54′32″N 97°07′42″W

- Interactive map of North Point Douglas
- Type: neighbourhood in Winnipeg, Manitoba, Canada.
- Location: Winnipeg, Manitoba, Canada

History
- Established: 1812

Site notes
- Governing body: Parks Canada
- Website: collection of photos of the neighbourhood

National Historic Site of Canada

North Point Douglas is a small neighbourhood located in the city of Winnipeg, Manitoba, Canada.

North Point Douglas comprises the northern portion of a peninsula of the Red River. Its boundaries are Main Street (west), Redwood Avenue (north), the Red River (east), and the Canadian Pacific Railway mainline (south), which bisects the peninsula. The southern portion of the peninsula is the neighbourhood of South Point Douglas (which is also considered part of Downtown Winnipeg.) Together, these two neighbourhoods are known simply known as "Point Douglas". In 2001, North Point Douglas had a population of 2,260.

North Point Douglas is one of the Winnipeg's oldest neighbourhoods. Today, North Point Douglas boasts two of Winnipeg's oldest houses - Barber House and Ross House Museum. It is also considered part of Winnipeg's North End.

== History ==
The eastern point of the neighbourhood was a traditional gathering place for Aboriginal tribes for ceremonial rites (while The Forks nearby was traditionally used for trading purposes). This is believed to have occurred prior to European contact, and continued until urbanization in the 1870s.

In 1812, this first group of Selkirk Settlers arrived in Point Douglas and began raising wheat crops on the point and along the Red River, becoming the first agrarian colony west of the Great Lakes.

As the Red River Colony (as the Winnipeg region was known) grew, a small cluster of commercial establishments developed on the Fort Garry road at Point Douglas by 1862, notably those of William Fonseca and Edmond Barber. After the incorporation of the City of Winnipeg in 1873, Point Douglas developed as a neighbourhood. Several notable citizens resided there, including merchant James Ashdown and Manitoba premier John Norquay. Among the houses of these men, there developed more modest cottages, industry such as Brown and Rutherford, a lumber company established in Point Douglas in 1872.

In 1881, Point Douglas was selected as the location that the Canadian Pacific Railway would cross the Red River. This move solidified Point Douglas as a choice location for industrial firms, who could take advantage of proximity to the railway. With the railroad completed by 1885, Winnipeg experienced an intense period of growth, and by 1914, Point Douglas had become a densely populated working-class neighbourhood, with many immigrants from Eastern Europe.

== Today ==
North Point Douglas continues to be primarily a residential neighbourhood but is also home to commercial and light industrial uses, with industry located mainly on the south side of the neighbourhood along the CPR tracks and commercial establishments on the western side, along Main Street, one of the city's busiest thoroughfares.

North Point Douglas is immediately north of Downtown Winnipeg and is considered part of Winnipeg's inner city. It has faced many of the same challenges that have characterized the North American city in the postwar decades: population and economic decline, crime, drug abuse, and a lack of investment. In recent years, the neighbourhood has begun to stabilize by efforts by community groups like the Point Douglas Residents Committee and North End Community Renewal Corporation and through new and long-time residents renovating properties.

== Ross House ==
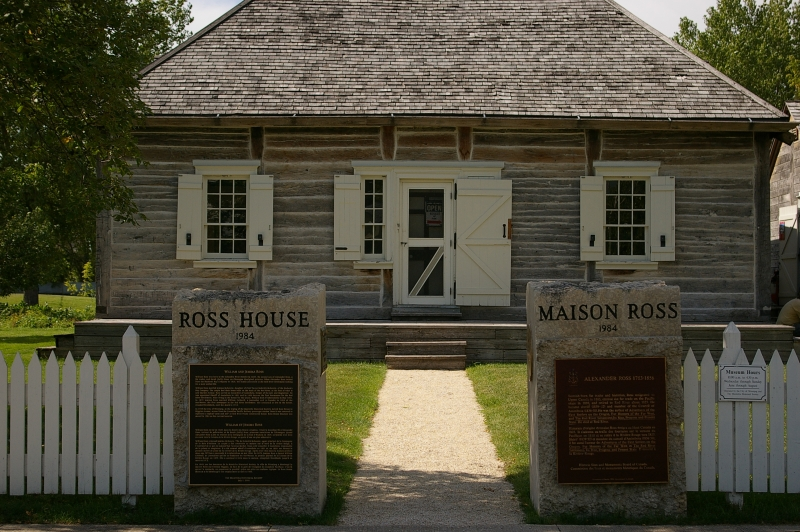
Ross House Museum

Ross House had its beginnings in 1852 when construction commenced on William Ross's log home. The museum was moved to its current location at 140 Meade Street (Joe Zuken Heritage Park, Point Douglas) in 1984. The construction of Ross House is a prime example of a Red River frame building.

== Crime ==
North Point Douglas has very high crime rates. In 2012, there were 38 robberies (1707.9 per 100,000 residents), 33 auto thefts (1483.1), 76 break-ins (3415.7) and 2 shootings (89.9). The robbery rate is 22 times higher than the national rate (79 per 100,000 residents).

== Demographics ==
Population history
Year	Pop.	±%
1971	4,210	—
1976	3,530	−16.2%
1981	3,170	−10.2%
1986	3,285	+3.6%
1991	3,205	−2.4%
1996	2,895	−9.7%
2001	2,260	−21.9%
2006	2,225	−1.5%

The population of North Point Douglas in 2006 was 2,225 people. The average household income is $31,029, which is about half the average income of Winnipeg as a city. The racial make up of North Point Douglas was:

- 57.1% White
- 34.2% Aboriginal; 25.8% First Nations, 8.3% Metis
- 6.1% Southeast Asian; 3.6% Filipino
- 1.3% Latin American
- 0.9% Black
- 0.4% South Asian
