= Norman Mittelmann =

Canadian opera singer (1932–2019)

Norman Mittelmann (25 May 1932 – 17 March 2019) was a Canadian operatic baritone who had an active international opera career from the 1950s through the 1990s. A winner of the Metropolitan Opera National Council Auditions, Mittelmann performed periodically at the Met from 1961 through 1984. Primarily active with opera houses in Europe, he was a resident artist at the Grillo-Theater in Essen, Germany (1959–1961), the Deutsche Oper am Rhein (1960–1964), and the Zürich Opera (1964–1982) in addition to appearing frequently with other opera houses internationally as a guest artist. His voice is preserved on several live complete opera recordings from the 1960s and 1970s that have been released on disc; including performances with Luciano Pavarotti, Renata Scotto, Shirley Verrett, Plácido Domingo, Jon Vickers, Birgit Nilsson, and Richard Tucker.

== Life and career ==
Born into a Jewish family in Winnipeg, Manitoba, Mittelmann graduated from St. John's High School in his native city. During high school he was a member of the Winnipeg All Star High School Football Team. He first studied singing with Canadian soprano Doris Lewis in Manitoba, before entering the Curtis Institute of Music in Philadelphia on a full scholarship in 1950 at the age of 18. At Curtis he was a pupil of Martial Singher, Vladimir Sokoloff, and Richard Bonelli. In a 1961 Opera News interview he credited Singher with establishing the core of his technique, and enabling him to be successful professionally.

After completing his studies at Curtis in 1954, Mittelmann pursued graduate studies at the Music Academy of the West in Montecito, California in 1955 and 1956 where he was a pupil of Lotte Lehmann. He made his professional opera debut in Santa Barbara in 1956; portraying Count Almaviva in Mozart's The Marriage of Figaro and Harlequin in Richard Strauss's Ariadne auf Naxos in productions directed by Lehmann. That same year he performed in the United States premiere of Darius Milhaud's David at the Hollywood Bowl in Los Angeles. In 1958 he portrayed Marcello in Giacomo Puccini's La bohème for his first opera appearance in Canada in a production mounted by the Canadian Opera Company (COC). He later returned to the COC in a critically lauded portrayal of the four villains (Lindorf, Coppelius, Dappertutto and Dr. Miracle) in Offenbach's The Tales of Hoffmann in 1967; a production which he performed both in Toronto's opera house and at Expo 67 in Montreal.

In 1959 Mittelmann won the Metropolitan Opera National Council Auditions. However, he chose to delay his offered contract with the Met to pursue work in Europe. From 1959 until 1961 he was a principal artist at the Grillo-Theater in Essen, Germany. He made his debut at the Metropolitan Opera House as the Herald in Richard Wagner's Lohengrin on 28 October 1961; and continued to perform periodically at the Met through 1985. Other roles he portrayed at the Met included Amonasro in Aida, Don Carlo in La forza del destino, Donner in Das Rheingold, Faninal in Der Rosenkavalier, Gunther in Götterdämmerung, the High Priest in Samson et Dalila, Jochanaan in Salome, Kothner in Die Meistersinger von Nürnberg, Mandryka in Arabella, both Silvio and Tonio in Pagliacci, and Valentin in Faust. His final appearance at the Met was on November 18, 1985 as Shaklovity in Modest Mussorgsky's Khovanshchina.

Mittelmann was a resident artist at the Deutsche Oper am Rhein from 1960 through 1964. He left that position to join the roster of resident artist at the Zürich Opera where he was committed from 1964 through 1982. A frequent guest artist with opera houses internationally, he also performed leading roles with the Bavarian State Opera, the Berlin State Opera, the Lyric Opera of Chicago (debut as Ruprecht in Prokofiev’s The Fiery Angel in 1966), the Paris Opera, the Royal Opera, London (debut as Germont in La traviata in 1965), the Teatro Colón, and the Vienna State Opera among other major opera companies during his career. In 1970 he created the role of Daniel in the world premiere of Willy Burkhard’s Ein Stern geht auf aus Jaakob at the Hamburg State Opera. He performed in several productions with the San Francisco Opera from 1972 until 1979; appearing as Amonasro, Barnaba in La Gioconda, Germont, Nelusko in L'Africaine, and Rodrigo in Don Carlo. In 1983 he performed the role of Shishkov in the United States premiere of Leoš Janáček's From the House of the Dead with the New York Philharmonic. His final opera performance was in 1991, although he continued to work as a concert performer for several more years.

Mittelmann lived in retirement in Palm Springs, California where he sold real estate and owned and operated a restaurant. He died on 17 March 2019 in Palm Desert, California.

== Complete opera recordings ==
Year	Title	Role	Cast	Conductor orchestra	Live / studio	Label
1961	Wagner: Lohengrin	Heerufer	Mittelmann, Richard Cassilly, Eleanor Steber, Margaret Harshaw, Walter Cassel, et al.	Julius Rudel; Chorus and orchestra of the Philadelphia Lyric Opera	Live, 24 November 1961	OOA
1961	Wagner: Das Rheingold	Donner	Mittelmann, George London, Irene Dalis, Herbert Schachtschneider, Robert Nagy, et al.	Wolfgang Sawallisch; Chorus and orchestra of the Metropolitan Opera	Metropolitan Opera radio broadcast, 16 December 1961	NPR
1962	Leoncavallo: Pagliacci	Silvio	Mittelmann, Raina Kabaivanska, Carlo Bergonzi, et al.	Fausto Cleva; Chorus and orchestra of the Metropolitan Opera	Metropolitan Opera radio broadcast, 27 October 1962	NPR
1965	Saint-Saëns: Samson et Dalila	The High Priest	Mittelmann, Giulietta Simionato, Jon Vickers, et al.	Fausto Cleva; Chorus and orchestra of the Metropolitan Opera	Metropolitan Opera radio broadcast, 28 May 1965	NPR
1970	Donizetti: Lucia di Lammermoor	Lord Enrico Ashton	Mittelmann, Cristina Deutekom, Richard Tucker, et al.	Antonino Votto; Chorus and orchestra of the Lyric Opera of Chicago	Live, October 31, 1970	TOL LUC<
1971	Wagner: Tristan und Isolde	Kurwenal	Mittelmann, Jon Vickers, Birgit Nilsson, et al.	Horst Stein; Chorus and orchestra of the Teatro Colón	Live	VAIA, released 1999
1972	Verdi: Aida	Amonasro	Mittelmann, Richard Cassilly, Marina Krilovici, Simon Estes, et al.	Jesús López Cobos; Chorus and orchestra of the San Francisco Opera	Live, 24 November 1972	Premiere 1916
1973	Meyerbeer: L'Africaine	Nelusko	Mittelmann, Shirley Verrett, Plácido Domingo, et al.	Jean Périsson; Chorus and orchestra of the San Francisco Opera	Live	Opera d'oro
1974	Verdi: La traviata	Germont	Mittelmann, Antigone Sgourda, Barry Morell, et al.	Alberto Erede; Chorus and orchestra of the Zürich Opera	Live, 3 March 1974	Lyric Distribution
1974	Verdi: Un ballo in maschera	Renato	Mittelmann, Luciano Pavarotti, Renata Scotto, et al.	Nello Santi; Chorus and orchestra of the Hamburg State Opera	Live, 17 June 1974	Lyric Distribution
1975	Puccini: Madama Butterfly	Scarpia	Mittelmann, Ghena Dimitrova, Renato Francesconi, et al.	Michaelangelo Veltri; Chorus and orchestra of the Teatro Colón	Live	IMR Classic Records, 2003
1976	Offenbach: The Tales of Hoffmann	Lindorf, Coppelius, Dappertutto and Dr. Miracle	Mittelmann, Ruth Welting, Plácido Domingo, et al.	Bruno Bartoletti; Chorus and orchestra of the Lyric Opera of Chicago	Live	TOL CON

== Citations ==
=== Sources ===
- Steiger, Karsten (2011). Opern-Diskographie: Verzeichnis aller Audio- und Video-Gesamtaufnahmen. De Gruyter. ISBN 978-3-11-095596-5.

=== Further reading ===
- Interview with Norman Mittelmann, September 23, 1982
