= Ernie Ahoff =

Canadian professional football player

Profile
- Positions: Guard, T

Personal information
- Born: c. 1923
- Died: November 23, 1985 (aged 61–62)
- Listed height: 5 ft 10 in (1.78 m)
- Listed weight: 230 lb (104 kg)

Career information
- High school: St. John's HS
- Jrs.: Winnipeg YMHA

Career history
- 1946–1949: Winnipeg Blue Bombers

Ernie Ahoff (died November 23, 1985) was a Canadian professional football guard and tackle who played for the Winnipeg Blue Bombers of the Canadian Football League. He played in 36 games for the Blue Bombers from 1946 to 1949.
