= Collège Churchill High School =

Location
- 510 Hay Street; Winnipeg, Manitoba, R3L 2L6; Canada; 49.8672°N 97.1317°W

Information
- School type: Secondary school
- Motto: Pride & Tradition
- Founded: 1955
- School district: Winnipeg School Division
- Superintendent: Matt Henderson
- Area trustee: Lois Brothers
- Principal: Georgia Wells
- Grades: 7 - 12
- Enrollment: 783 (2025-2026)
- Language: English, French Immersion
- Nickname: Bulldogs
- Team name: Churchill Bulldogs
- Website: www.winnipegsd.ca/schools/churchill
- Last updated: June 15, 2026

Collège Churchill High School is a secondary school in Winnipeg, Manitoba that teaches grades 7 to 12. It is part of the Winnipeg School Division.

== History ==
Located within the boundaries of the Winnipeg School Division, Churchill High School is named after Sir Winston Churchill (1874 – 1965). Sir Winston Churchill was a British statesman, historian and orator who served as the British Prime Minister until 1955. He devoted his powers to seeking world peace. Sir Winston Churchill was described as having the heart of a lion, the courage of a bulldog and a digestive system similar to a cement mixer. He first visited Winnipeg in 1901 stating that "Winnipeg is a Winner". The cornerstone of Churchill High School was laid in 1955, where Arnold Avenue and Hay Street meet in Riverview. The building itself has undergone many physical changes to meet the needs of the surrounding community.

Before 2021, Churchill High School maintained an enrolment of approximately 500 students. The building also housed a second school, Collège Churchill, with an additional 150 students. Athletics, Performing Arts and other co-curricular activities are shared between both schools. This helps foster a positive and co-operative school spirit. The two schools merged in 2021. The school offers academic programs, including the Flexible Learning and Special Education Programs. Churchill also provides many other experiences to connect students with the school and prepare them for an enjoyable and successful high school career.
