= North End, Winnipeg =

North End
- Neighbourhood
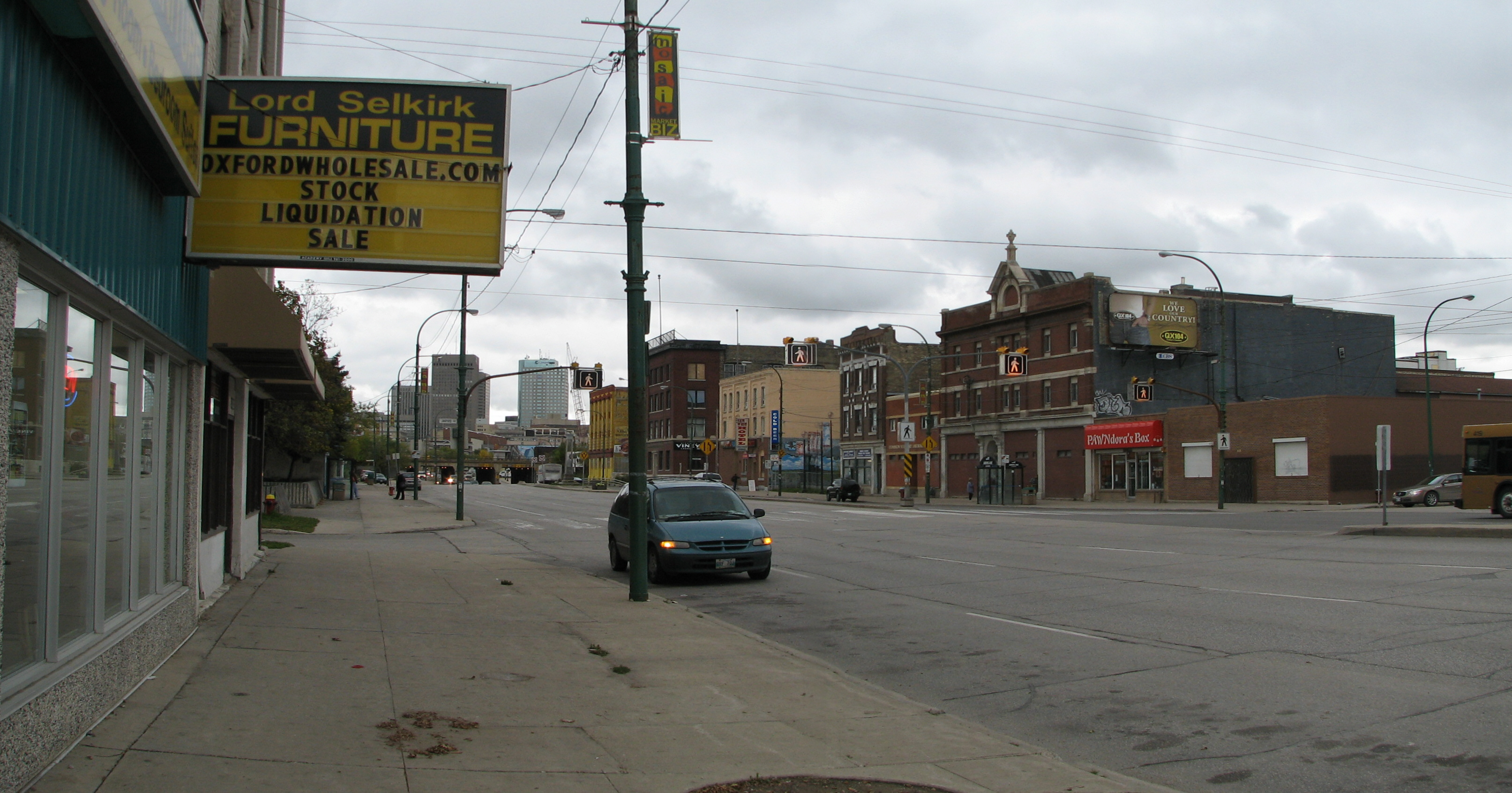
- Interactive map of North End
- Country: Canada
- Province: Manitoba
- City: Winnipeg

Population (2006)
  - Total: 55,240

Winnipeg's North End is a large urban area located to the north and northwest of Downtown Winnipeg. It is bordered by the Red River on the east, the Canadian Pacific Railway (CPR) mainline on the south, the City of Winnipeg boundary (Brookside Boulevard) on the west and Jefferson Avenue, Keewatin Street, Carruthers Avenue, McGregor Street and the lane between McAdam and Smithfield Avenues on the north. It is the northern section of the City of Winnipeg as it existed prior to the 1972 municipal amalgamation. Winnipeg's northern suburbs such as West Kildonan and Old Kildonan are not considered part of the North End. The CPR mainline and its Winnipeg yards, which are one of the largest railway yards in the world, act as a physical barrier between the North End and the rest of Winnipeg to the south. This has resulted in the North End remaining a very distinct and unique part of Winnipeg.

The areas to the east of McPhillips Street are considered the Old North End, and were developed in the late 19th century and early 20th century, while the areas to the west were generally developed in the 1940s and later. The North End is primarily residential, though there is some light industrial development in Inkster Industrial Park and adjacent to Oak Point Highway and Brookside Boulevard.

== History ==
The site of the North End was part of the Selkirk Settlement, which was established in 1812. The boundaries of the narrow farm lots surveyed by Peter Fidler early in the 19th century form many of the east-west streets in the North End, and many of these streets are named after settlers who lived in the area, such as Pritchard, Inkster, and Bannerman. The North End is located in the Anglican Parish of St. John, and much of the North End was referred to as "St. John's" in the 19th and 20th centuries.

The City of Winnipeg was incorporated, and its northern boundary was Burrows Avenue. Gradually the boundary of the City of Winnipeg was extended north and parts of the North End today are in the Parish of Kildonan. It is one of the oldest settled parts of Winnipeg. It was the location of Fort Douglas, built by the Selkirk settlers in 1812. The present-day North End was divided into long, narrow farming lots occupied by Selkirk Settlers.

The arrival of the Canadian Pacific Railway to Winnipeg would have a significant impact on the development of the North End as a largely working class neighbourhood. The main railway passed through what was then the northern end of the small City of Winnipeg. The presence of this busy railroad and associated rail yards would effectively divide the North End from the rest of the city. As Winnipeg began to experience rapid growth in the late 19th century, the North End began to develop as a largely working class residential area, beginning in the 1880s. Streetcar service on Main Street commenced in 1892, although early patrons were forced to walk across the railway tracks for transportation to Downtown Winnipeg until completion of the Main Street underpass in 1904.

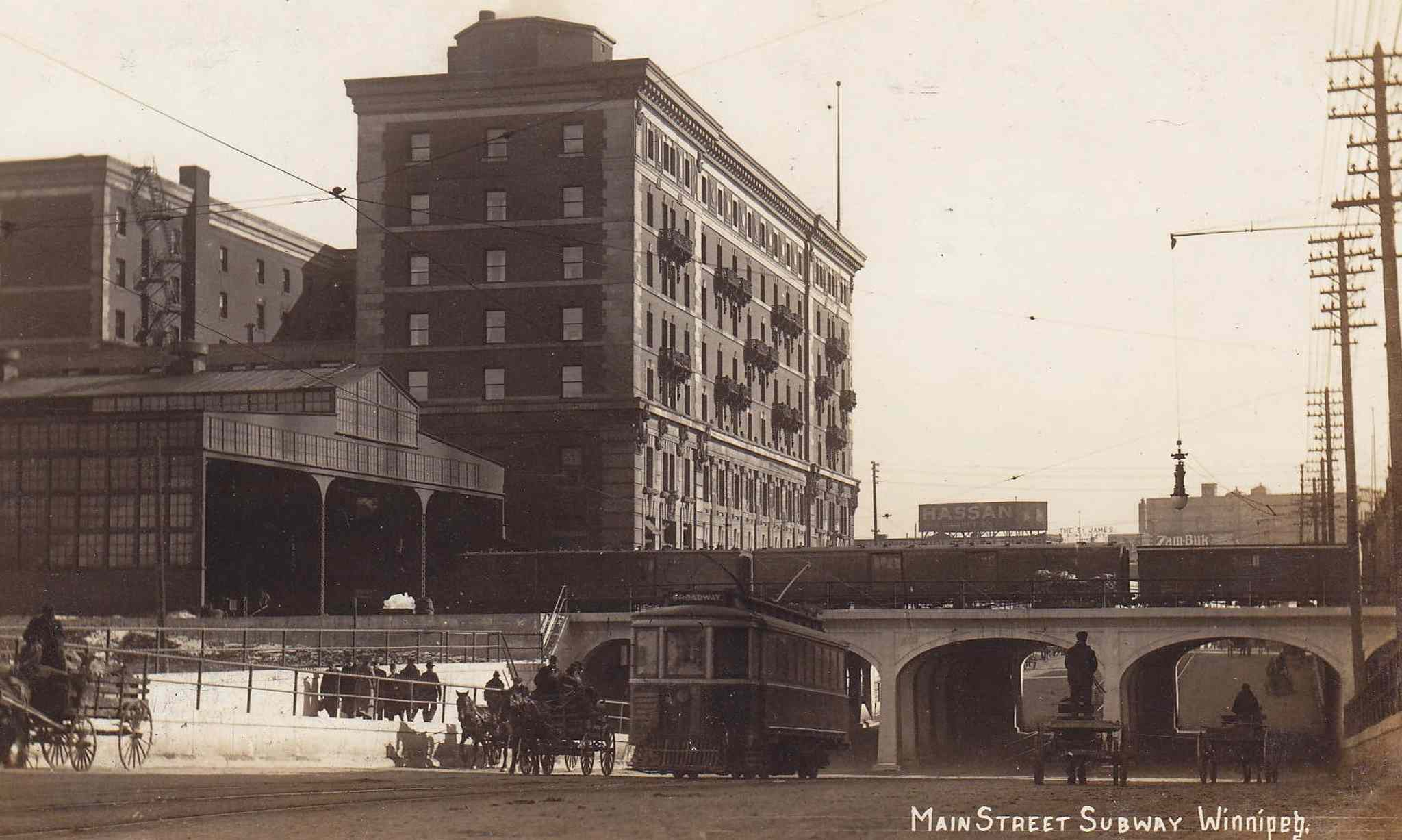
Main Street underpass, looking south, circa 1910

By the 1910s the area was heavily developed and had a large population of immigrants from Central and Eastern Europe. The area was known for its high incidences of extreme poverty and relatively high prevalence of diseases such as typhoid fever and cholera. In the Winnipeg General Strike of 1919, the North End, as a working class area, was largely pro-strike.

The area has long been acknowledged as the most socially deprived part of the city of Winnipeg. Parts of the area, especially east of McPhillips Street and south of Mountain Avenue are marked by high drug use and its associated crime and gang violence. Since the 1980s, attempts to revitalize parts of the North End have been made with many grassroot organizations sprouting up along with many not-for-profit organizations. Together with neighbourhood grants and the grants through Manitoba Hydro, the area has seen a major improvement in its housing. Manitoba Hydro's grant alone accounted for a large number of homes to be totally insulated and have their furnaces upgraded.

The North End was considered Ward Three in the Old City of Winnipeg and historically voted for left of centre parties. It was represented by Communist Party of Canada aldermen (Jacob Penner and Joseph Zuken) from 1933 to 1983. The area also elected communists James Litterick and Bill Kardash to the Manitoba Legislative Assembly. From the 1990s until recently, the area has tended to support the New Democratic Party in Federal elections.

== Neighbourhoods ==
The boundaries of the North End contain 18 neighbourhoods: North Point Douglas, Lord Selkirk Park, Dufferin, Dufferin Industrial and William Whyte, which are parts of the Point Douglas South neighbourhood cluster, Mynarski, Burrows Central, Robertson, Inkster-Faraday, St John's, St. Johns Park and Luxton, which are parts of the Point Douglas North neighbourhood cluster, Weston Shops, Inkster Industrial, Burrows-Keewatin and Shaughnessy Park of the Inkster East neighbourhood cluster, and Tyndall Park and Oak Point Highway of the Inkster West neighbourhood cluster. The neighborhoods in bold are a part of the "Old North End".

=== Crime ===
In 2011, there were 18 homicides in the North End alone, making a rate per 100,000 people at 32.6, but the following year there were 6, making the rate 10.2. Midway through 2013, dropped to 7.2. In 2018, there were 8 homicides in North End, making the homicide rate 14.4

In the Old North End in 2012, there were 374 robberies (1175.0 per 100,000 residents), 352 auto thefts (1105.9), 624 break-ins (1960.4) and 17 shootings (53.4).

Although the North End is infamous for its crime rates to Winnipeggers, crime in the North End, especially violent crimes, are much more densely concentrated in its southern and eastern halves: south of Mountain Avenue and east of Arlington Street, which constitute the neighborhoods of Dufferin, Lord Selkirk Park, North Point Douglas and William Whyte. The table below shows the crime rates of various crimes in each of the North End neighborhoods. The crime data spans 5 years from the year 2017 to the year 2021. The rates are crimes per 100,000 residents per year.

Crime Rates per 100,000 people in North End Neighborhoods, 2017-2021
Sub-area	Neighborhood	Pop.	Homicide	r/ (Note: Rate per 100,000 people per year: Figure is calculated by dividing the total incidences of a crime by the neighborhood population, then multiplying by 100,000, and then dividing by 5, as the data spans 5 years)	Robbery	r/	Agr. Aslt. (Note: Aggravated assault: Includes assaults which cause bodily harm or utilize weapons; includes the following categories given on Winnipeg CrimeMaps: aggravated assault, aggravated sexual assault, assault against peace officer, assault with weapon or causing bodily harm, attempted murder, firearms offences, sexual assault with a weapon.)	r/	Cmn. Aslt. (Note: Common assault: Excludes assaults which cause bodily harm or utilize weapons; includes the following categories given on Winnipeg CrimeMaps: assault against peace officer, common assault, other assaults, sexual assault.)	r/	Utt. Threat (Note: Abbreviated from: uttering threats)	r/	Property	r/
St. John's	Luxton	2,575	0	0.0	45	349.5	36	279.6	63	489.3	20	155.3	749	5,817.5
St. John's	St. John's	8,330	11	26.4	347	833.1	517	1,241.3	721	1,731.1	157	377.0	4,028	9,671.1
St. John's	St. John's Park	530	0	0.0	54	2,037.7	39	1,471.7	69	2,603.8	17	641.5	450	16,981.1
--	**St. John's**	**11,435**	**11**	**19.2**	**446**	**780.1**	**592**	**1,035.4**	**853**	**1,491.9**	**194**	**339.3**	**5,227**	**9,142.1**
Burrows	Burrows Central	5,415	4	14.8	167	616.8	118	435.8	198	731.3	38	140.4	1,900	7,017.5
Burrows	Inkster-Faraday	4,545	0	0.0	82	360.8	96	422.4	129	567.7	54	237.6	1,556	6,847.1
Burrows	Robertson	4,970	0	0.0	42	169.0	29	116.7	45	181.1	21	84.5	1,211	4,873.2
--	**Burrows**	**14,930**	**4**	**5.4**	**291**	**389.8**	**243**	**325.5**	**372**	**498.3**	**113**	**151.4**	**4,667**	**6,251.8**
Old North End	Dufferin (Note: Includes the unpopulated area Dufferin Industrial as well)	2,255	7	62.1	152	1,348.1	258	2,288.2	313	2,776.1	73	647.5	1,782	15,804.9
Old North End	Lord Selkirk Park	1,520	5	65.8	310	4,078.9	340	4,473.7	329	4,328.9	86	1,131.6	1,399	18,407.9
Old North End	North Point Douglas	2,025	4	39.5	145	1,432.1	270	2,666.7	322	3,180.2	80	790.1	1,913	18,893.8
Old North End	William Whyte	6,260	28	89.5	610	1,948.9	932	2,977.6	1,029	3,287.5	272	869.0	4,333	13,843.5
--	**Old North End**	**12,060**	**44**	**73.0**	**1,217**	**2018.2**	**1,800**	**2,985.1**	**1,993**	**3,305.1**	**511**	**847.4**	**9,427**	**15,633.5**
**Total**	**North End**	**38,425**	**59**	**30.7**	**1954**	**1017.0**	**2,635**	**1,371.5**	**3,218**	**1,675.0**	**818**	**425.8**	**19,321**	**10,056.5**

== Demographics ==
Population history
Year	Pop.	±%
1996	44,363	—
2001	42,020	−5.3%
2006	44,156	+5.1%
2011	46,766	+5.9%
2016	48,320	+3.3%
2021	49,393	+2.2%
Source: Statistics Canada

The population of the North End according to the 2006 Census, is 55,240 people (Old North End: 31,830).

Panethnic groups in North End, Winnipeg (2001−2021)
Panethnic group	2021 census		2016 census		2011 census		2006 census		2001 census	
Panethnic group	Pop.	%	Pop.	%	Pop.	%	Pop.	%	Pop.	%
European (Note: Statistic includes all persons that did not make up part of a visible minority or an indigenous identity.)	16,885	34.72%	16,690	35.21%	20,860	45.62%	22,575	51.75%	24,615	57.75%
Southeast Asian (Note: Statistic includes total responses of "Filipino" and "Southeast Asian" under visible minority section on census.)	15,300	31.46%	14,255	30.07%	10,495	22.95%	6,625	15.19%	5,445	12.78%
Indigenous	12,880	26.49%	13,125	27.69%	12,405	27.13%	12,180	27.92%	10,715	25.14%
African	1,595	3.28%	1,260	2.66%	760	1.66%	575	1.32%	660	1.55%
South Asian	590	1.21%	305	0.64%	225	0.49%	155	0.36%	195	0.46%
Latin American	380	0.78%	430	0.91%	275	0.6%	490	1.12%	335	0.79%
East Asian (Note: Statistic includes total responses of "Chinese", "Korean", and "Japanese" under visible minority section on census.)	315	0.65%	475	1%	345	0.75%	525	1.2%	475	1.11%
Middle Eastern (Note: Statistic includes total responses of "West Asian" and "Arab" under visible minority section on census.)	25	0.05%	235	0.5%	160	0.35%	40	0.09%	60	0.14%
Other/multiracial (Note: Statistic includes total responses of "Visible minority, n.i.e." and "Multiple visible minorities" under visible minority section on census.)	660	1.36%	625	1.32%	205	0.45%	460	1.05%	120	0.28%
Total responses	48,630	98.46%	47,400	98.1%	45,730	97.78%	43,625	98.8%	42,620	101.43%
Total population	49,393	100%	48,320	100%	46,766	100%	44,156	100%	42,020	100%
Note: Totals greater than 100% due to multiple origin responses. 2021 census sources: 2016 census sources: 2011 census sources: 2006 census sources:

== Famous people ==
Game show host and producer Monty Hall, novelists Adele Wiseman, comedian David Steinberg, journalist Larry Zolf, politician Lloyd Axworthy, musician Burton Cummings of the Guess Who, scientist Louis Slotin, Olympian Martin Riley and NHL players Bill Mosienko and Terry Sawchuk.
