= Arthur Schafer =

Canadian ethicist

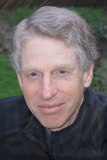
- Born: June 15, 1942 (age 84)
- Scientific career
- Fields: Bioethics, Philosophy of Law, Social and Political Philosophy
- Workplaces: University of Manitoba

Arthur Schafer is a Canadian ethicist specializing in bioethics, philosophy of law, social philosophy and political philosophy. He is Director of the Centre for Professional and Applied Ethics, at the University of Manitoba. He is also a full professor in the Department of Philosophy and an ethics consultant for the Department of Paediatrics and Child Health at the Health Sciences Centre in Winnipeg. For ten years he was head of the Section of Bio-Medical Ethics in the Faculty of Medicine of the University of Manitoba. He has also served as visiting scholar at Green College, Oxford.

Schafer has received a number of awards and honours. He is a Canadian Commonwealth Scholar, Honorary Woodrow Wilson Scholar, a Canada Council Fellow. At the University of Manitoba he has received the Stanton Teaching Excellence Award, the Campbell Award for University Outreach, and the University Teaching Service Award for Teaching Excellence.

Schafer has published widely in the fields of moral, social, and political philosophy. He is author of The Buck Stops Here: Reflections on moral responsibility, democratic accountability and military values, and co-editor of Ethics and Animal Experimentation. His curriculum vitae lists more than 90 scholarly articles and book chapters, covering a wide range of topics, with a special focus on issues in professional and bio-medical ethics, business and environmental ethics. Professor Schafer is National Research Associate of the Canadian Centre for Policy Alternatives, which has published two of his Reports. He has made several hundred conference presentations in Canada and abroad, and has written dozens of newspaper articles for The Globe and Mail, The Toronto Star, The Winnipeg Free Press, The Medical Post, and The Sunday Times (London).

Schafer has been a frequent guest on CBC radio and television, including many appearances on CBC radio's Morningside, This Morning and The Current, As It Happens, Sunday Morning, and Cross Country Check Up; and CBC television's The National, The Journal, The National Magazine, and Newsworld. He has also appeared frequently on The Discovery Network's "@Discovery.ca", discussing ethical and value aspects of medicine, science and technology; and on the CTV, WTN, Global and Baton television networks.
