= Manitoba Council for International Cooperation =

- Founded: 1974 in Canada
- Type: Non-profit organisation
- Location: Winnipeg, Manitoba, Canada
- Fields: Development, Global Citizenship, Fair Trade, Public Engagement
- Website: Official Website

Manitoba Council for International Cooperation (commonly known as MCIC) is a Canadian Manitoba-based non-profit organisation. Established in 1974 in Winnipeg, Manitoba, it is a coalition of over forty organizations who are committed to funding and promoting international development. MCIC has responsibility for distributing Government of Manitoba and CIDA funds designated for international development and emergency relief and rehabilitation. MCIC also works within Manitoba to build understanding and engagement on international issues.

== Select Member Organisations ==
Canada World Youth
Canadian Red Cross
Engineers Without Borders (Canada)
Plan Canada
United Church of Canada
