= Technical Vocational High School =

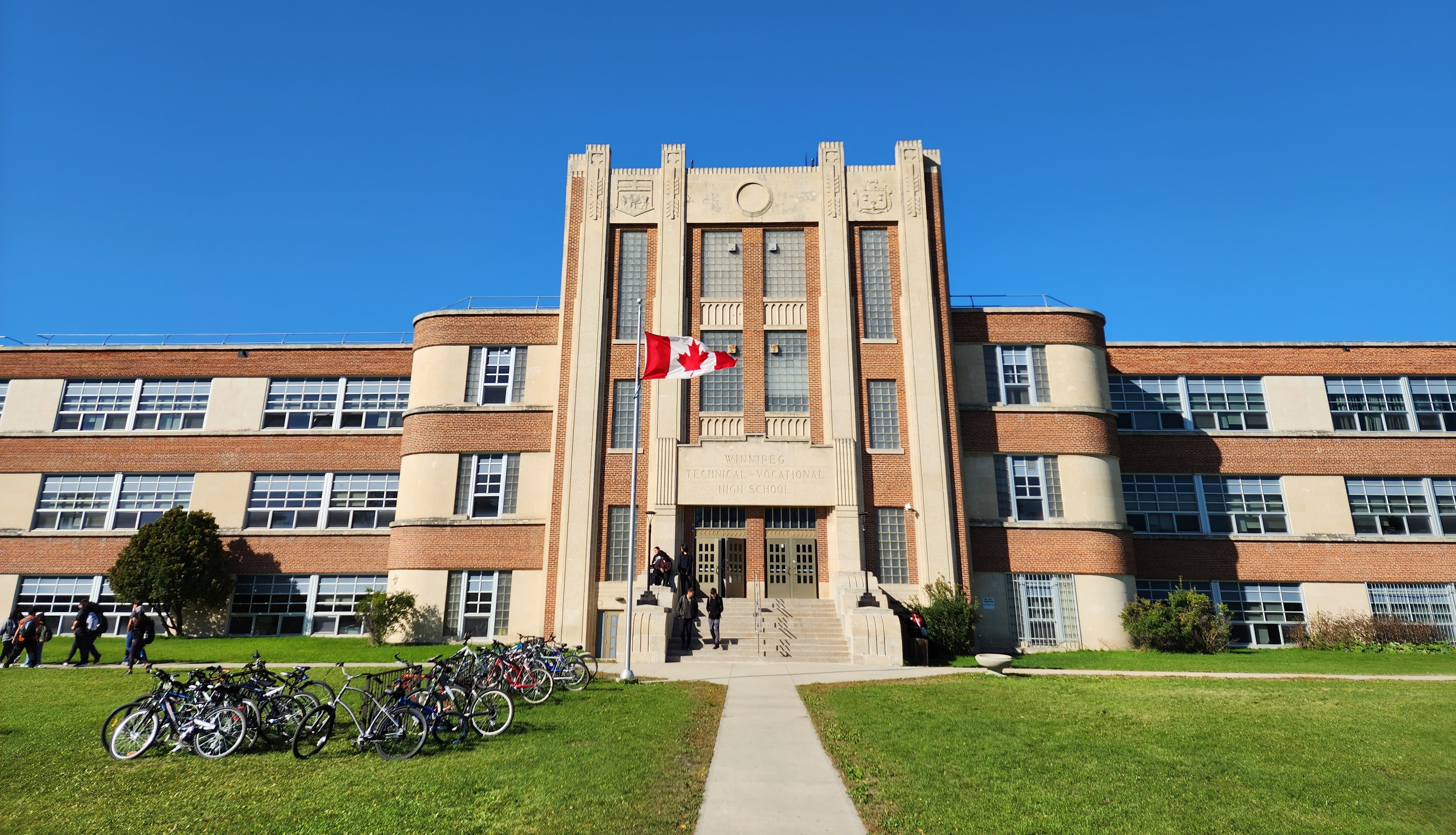
- The Winnipeg Technical Vocational High School viewed from the main east entrance.

Location
- 1555 Wall Street; Winnipeg, Manitoba, R3E 2S2; Canada; 49°54′22″N 97°10′50″W

Information
- School type: Public High School
- Motto: Think Green, Act Gold, Be A Hornet
- Founded: 1951; 75 years ago
- School district: Winnipeg School Division
- Superintendent: Matt Henderson
- Area trustee: Perla Javate
- Principal: Lindsey Munz
- Vice Principal: Tracy Darbyshire
- Vice Principal: Andrew Gilbart
- Grades: 9–12
- Enrollment: 1262 (2025-2026)
- Language: English
- Area: West End
- Colours: Green and Gold
- Athletics conference: MHSAA; WHSFL
- Mascot: Stinger
- Team name: Tec Voc Hornets
- Feeder schools: All schools in the Winnipeg School Division
- Website: www.winnipegsd.ca/technicalvocational
- Last updated: June 15, 2026

Technical Vocational High School (known colloquially as Tec Voc), is a high school in the west end of Winnipeg, Manitoba.

== History ==
Tec Voc was founded in 1951 by the Winnipeg School Division with the goal of creating the top technical high school in the province of Manitoba. Tec Voc is located in the City of Winnipeg, in the West End.

Students at Tec Voc can earn a Vocational Diploma and an Academic Diploma.

In terms of physical size, Tec Voc is the largest high school in Manitoba. It has a population of around 1200 students, placing it as the 8th most populated school in Winnipeg School Division.

== Sports ==
Tec Voc's sports teams are named The Hornets. Sports teams include:

- Football
- Volleyball
- Basketball
- Soccer
- Badminton
- Track and Field
- Cheerleading
- Curling
- Golf
- Dance Tec Company (DTC)
- Rugby
- Wrestling
