= St. Boniface (provincial electoral district) =

Provincial electoral district in Manitoba, Canada

Coordinates: 49.886°N 97.103°W

Manitoba electoral district
- Location in Winnipeg

Provincial electoral district
- Legislature: Legislative Assembly of Manitoba
MLA
Robert Loiselle
New Democratic
- District created: 1870
- First contested: 1870
- Last contested: 2023

Demographics
- Census division(s): Division No. 11
- Census subdivision(s): Winnipeg

St. Boniface (French: Saint-Boniface) is a provincial electoral district of Manitoba, Canada. It should not be confused with the federal electoral division of the same name, which includes most of the provincial riding's territory but has expanded boundaries and a larger population base. The riding has existed, in one form or another, since the province's creation.

In Manitoba's first general election (1870), the riding was divided into St. Boniface East and St. Boniface West. It became a single constituency in 1874, and has existed continuously since then.

The St. Boniface constituency elected its representation by preferential balloting from 1926 to 1953, a single member by instant runoff voting from 1926 to 1945 and two members by single transferable voting in 1949 and 1953. On all other occasions, it has been a single-member constituency, electing its member by First Past The Post.

St. Boniface is located in the central-eastern Winnipeg. Its boundaries roughly correspond with the historical community of Saint Boniface, Manitoba, which was a distinct civic jurisdiction before being amalgamated with the City of Winnipeg in 1971.

The riding's population in 1996 was 19,646. The average family income in 1999 was $45,193, with an unemployment rate of 10.5%. The service sector accounts for 18% of the riding's industry, with a further 15% in health and social services.

St. Boniface has historically been home to the largest francophone community in the Winnipeg area. According to a 1999 census, 34% of the riding's residents speak French as their first language—the highest rate in the province. The riding's aboriginal population is 8%, and almost 19% of the population is over 65 years of age.

For many years after the introduction of partisan politics in 1882, St. Boniface was a hotly contested battleground riding between the provincial Liberals and Conservatives (although candidates of the parliamentary left were also elected in the 1930s and 1940s). During the 1950s and 1960s, it was generally regarded as a safe seat for the Liberals.

In 1969, St. Boniface MLA Laurent Desjardins decided to sit as a Liberal Democrat, supporting the New Democratic Party government of Edward Schreyer. He formally joined the NDP in 1971, and aside from an overturned election result in 1973, continued to represent the area until 1988.

The provincial Liberals recaptured the seat in 1988, during a period of resurgence for that party in the province. After Neil Gaudry's death in 1999, Greg Selinger recaptured the seat for the NDP. He was reelected in 2003 with about 75 percent of the popular vote, and was named premier of Manitoba in 2009.

Selinger left politics two years after the NDP was heavily defeated at the 2016 provincial election, and newly elected Liberal leader Dougald Lamont won the seat at the ensuing by-election.

In the 2023 Manitoba general election, Lamont was defeated by the NDP and resigned as Liberal leader.

== Members of the Legislative Assembly ==
=== St. Boniface East (1870–1874) ===
Name	Party	Took office	Left office
Marc-Amable Girard	Governing Coalition/Cons	1870	1874

=== St. Boniface West (1870–1874) ===
Name	Party	Took office	Left office
Louis Schmidt	Governing Coalition/Cons	1870	1874

=== St. Boniface (single-member riding, 1874–1949) ===
Name	Party	Took office	Left office
Marc-Amable Girard	Governing Coalition/Cons	1874	1878
Alphonse LaRiviere	Governing Coalition/Lib-Cons	1878	1888
Roger Marion	Cons	1888	1892
James Prendergast	Cons-Lib, then Lib	1892	1896
Jean-B. Lauzon	Cons	1897	1899
S.A.D. Bertrand	Lib	1899	1900
Joseph Bernier	Cons	1900	1903
Horace Chevrier	Lib	1903	1907
Joseph Bernier	Cons	1907	1915
Joseph Dumas	Lib	1915	1920
Joseph Bernier	Independent	1920	1926
	Cons	1927	1932
Harold Lawrence	ILP	1932	1941
Austin Clarke	Lib-Prog	1941	1945
Edwin Hansford	CCF	1945	1949

=== St. Boniface (two-member riding, 1949–1958) ===
Name	Party	Took office	Left office
Joseph Van Belleghem	Lib-Prog	1949	1953
Edwin Hansford	CCF	1949	1953
Roger Teillet	Lib-Prog	1953	1958
L. Raymond Fennell	Lib-Prog	1953	1958

=== St. Boniface (single-member riding, 1958–) ===
Assembly	Years	Member	Party
25th	1958–1959	Roger Teillet	Liberal-Progressive
26th	1959–1961	Laurent Desjardins	Liberal-Progressive
26th	1961–1962	Laurent Desjardins	Liberal
27th	1962–1966	Laurent Desjardins	Liberal
28th	1966–1969	Laurent Desjardins	Liberal
29th	1969–1971	Laurent Desjardins	Liberal-Democrat
29th	1971–1973	Laurent Desjardins	New Democratic
30th	1973–1974	J. Paul Marion	Liberal
30th	1974–1977	Laurent Desjardins	New Democratic
31st	1977–1981	Laurent Desjardins	New Democratic
32nd	1982–1985	Laurent Desjardins	New Democratic
33rd	1985–1988	Laurent Desjardins	New Democratic
34th	1988–1990	Neil Gaudry	Liberal
35th	1990–1995	Neil Gaudry	Liberal
36th	1995–1999	Neil Gaudry	Liberal
37th	1999–2003	Greg Selinger	New Democratic
38th	2003–2007	Greg Selinger	New Democratic
39th	2007–2011	Greg Selinger	New Democratic
40th	2011–2016	Greg Selinger	New Democratic
41st	2016–2018	Greg Selinger	New Democratic
41st	2018–2019	Dougald Lamont	Liberal
42nd	2019–2023	Dougald Lamont	Liberal
43rd	2023–present	Robert Loiselle	New Democratic

== Electoral results ==
=== 2023 ===
2023 Manitoba general election
Party	Candidate	Votes	%	±%	Expenditures
New Democratic	Robert Loiselle	5,585	53.38	+23.51	$26,407.59
Liberal	Dougald Lamont	3,413	32.62	-9.06	$14,316.61
Progressive Conservative	Kiratveer Hayer	1,391	13.30	-5.85	$0.00
Communist	Damon Bath	73	0.70	–	$106.40
Total valid votes/expense limit		10,462	99.42	–	$69,418.00
Total rejected and declined ballots		61	0.58	–	
Turnout		10,523	60.06	+0.28	
Eligible voters		17,521			
New Democratic gain from Liberal		Swing		+16.29	
Source(s) Source: Elections Manitoba

=== 2019 ===
2019 Manitoba general election
Party	Candidate	Votes	%	±%	Expenditures
Liberal	Dougald Lamont	4,152	41.69	-0.56	$9,847.24
New Democratic	Laurissa Sims	2,975	29.87	+1.31	$9,258.35
Progressive Conservative	Megan Hoskins	1,907	19.15	+5.91	$894.61
Green	Jaclyn Jeanson	845	8.48	-7.46	$0.00
Manitoba Forward	Simone Fortier	81	0.81	New	$0.00
Total		9,960	99.03	–	
Rejected		98	0.97	+0.56	
Turnout		10,058	59.78	+12.88	
Eligible voters		16,824			
Liberal hold		Swing		-0.94	
Source(s) Source: Manitoba. Chief Electoral Officer (2019). Statement of Votes for the 42nd Provincial General Election, September 10, 2019 (PDF) (Report). Winnipeg: Elections Manitoba.

=== 2018 by-election ===
Manitoba provincial by-election, 17 July 2018: St. Boniface Resignation of Greg Selinger
Party	Candidate	Votes	%	±%	Expenditures
Liberal	Dougald Lamont	2,625	42.03	+22.57	$22,666.27
New Democratic	Blandine Tona	1,770	28.34	-14.07	$33,576.88
Green	Francoise Therrien Vrignon	1,017	16.28	+4.02	$9,318.95
Progressive Conservative	Mamadou Ka	834	13.35	-12.52	$23,227.71
Total valid votes/Expense limit		6,246	99.62	-	$43,782.00
Total rejected and declines votes		24	0.38	-1.24	
Turnout		6,270	48.38	-15.29	
Electors on the lists		13,356			
Liberal gain from New Democratic		Swing		+18.32	
Source: Elections Manitoba

=== 2016 ===
2016 Manitoba general election
Party	Candidate	Votes	%	±%	Expenditures
New Democratic	Greg Selinger	3,624	42.41	-26.47	$10,697.28
Progressive Conservative	Mamadou Ka	2,211	25.87	+7.97	$18,430.93
Liberal	Alain Landry	1,663	19.46	+12.40	$3,387.94
Green	Signe Knutson	1,048	12.26	+6.09	$0.00
Total valid votes/expense limit		8,546	98.38	-	$45,064.00
Total rejected ballots		141	1.62	+1.18	
Turnout		8,687	63.67	+4.17	
Eligible voters		13,644			
New Democratic hold		Swing		-17.22	
Source: Elections Manitoba

=== 2011 ===
2011 Manitoba general election
Party	Candidate	Votes	%	±%	Expenditures
New Democratic	Greg Selinger	5,914	68.87	+2.53	$25,356.02
Progressive Conservative	Frank Clark	1,537	17.90	+4.94	$6,094.72
Liberal	Brad Gross	606	7.06	−6.58	$641.00
Green	Alain Landry	530	6.17	−0.74	$96.10
Total valid votes		8,587	99.56		
Rejected and declined ballots		38	0.44		
Turnout		8,625	59.50		
Electors on the lists		14,496			

=== 2007 ===
2007 Manitoba general election
Party	Candidate	Votes	%	±%	Expenditures
New Democratic	Greg Selinger	5,090	66.04	−8.30	$16,599.60
Liberal	Gilbert Laberge	1,049	13.61	−0.82	$3,582.87
Progressive Conservative	Jennifer Tarrant	993	12.88	+1.65	$722.42
Green	Alain Landry	530	6.88	+6.88	$378.57
Communist	Thane-Dominic Carr	45	0.58	+0.58	$373.97
Total valid votes		7,707	100.00		
Rejected and declined ballots		38			
Turnout		7,745	59.56		
Electors on the lists		13,004			

=== 2003 ===
2003 Manitoba general election
Party	Candidate	Votes	%	±%	Expenditures
New Democratic	Greg Selinger	4,904	74.34	+17.77	$18,257.78
Liberal	Dougald Lamont	952	14.43	-16.71	$5,020.72
Progressive Conservative	Dan Zahari	741	11.23	-1.05	$769.27
Total valid votes		6,597	100.00		
Rejected and declined ballots		38			
Turnout		6,635	52.19		
Electors on the lists		12,712			

=== 1999 ===
1999 Manitoba general election
Party	Candidate	Votes	%	±%	Expenditures
New Democratic	Greg Selinger	5,439	56.57	+24.56	
Liberal	Jean-Paul Boily	2,994	31.14	-14.34	
Progressive Conservative	Robert Olson	1,181	12.28	-6.79	
Total valid votes		9614	100.00		
Rejected and declined ballots		63			
Turnout		9677	74.35		
Electors on the lists		13,015			

=== 1995 ===
1995 Manitoba general election
Party	Candidate	Votes	%	±%
Liberal	Neil Gaudry	4,021	45.48%	-9.93%
New Democratic	Rachel Massicotte	2,829	32.00%	8.99%
Progressive Conservative	Kim Sigurdson	1,686	19.07%	-2.53%
Independent	Ivan Lecuyer	306	3.46%	–
Total valid votes		8,883	100.00	
Rejected and declined ballots		41		
Turnout		8,924	71.3	
Electors on the lists		12,459		
Eligible voters / turnout		12,459	70.97%	1.29%
Source(s) Source: Manitoba. Chief Electoral Officer (1999). Statement of Votes for the 37th Provincial General Election, September 21, 2089 (PDF) (Report). Winnipeg: Elections Manitoba.

=== 1990 ===
1990 Manitoba general election
Party	Candidate	Votes	%	±%
Liberal	Neil Gaudry	4,928	55.40%	-5.76%
New Democratic	Robert Gooding	2,046	23.00%	1.05%
Progressive Conservative	Renn Marcoux	1,921	21.60%	4.71%
Total		8,895	–	–
Rejected		50	–	
Eligible voters / turnout		12,765	69.68%	-9.58%
Source(s) Source: Manitoba. Chief Electoral Officer (1999). Statement of Votes for the 37th Provincial General Election, September 21, 2086 (PDF) (Report). Winnipeg: Elections Manitoba.

=== 1988 ===
1988 Manitoba general election
Party	Candidate	Votes	%	±%
Liberal	Neil Gaudry	5,743	61.16%	37.34%
New Democratic	Lorette Beaudry-Ferland	2,061	21.95%	-38.82%
Progressive Conservative	Guy Savoie	1,586	16.89%	3.29%
Total		9,390	–	–
Rejected		60	–	
Eligible voters / turnout		11,846	79.27%	9.77%
Source(s) Source: Manitoba. Chief Electoral Officer (1999). Statement of Votes for the 37th Provincial General Election, September 21, 2085 (PDF) (Report). Winnipeg: Elections Manitoba.

=== 1986 ===
1986 Manitoba general election
Party	Candidate	Votes	%	±%
New Democratic	Laurent Desjardins	4,978	60.77	-2.61
Liberal	Georges Bohemier	1,951	23.82	+2.94
Progressive Conservative	Wes Rowson	1,114	13.60	-1.37
Progressive	James Jackson	149	1.82	+0.67
Turnout		8,220	69.73	
New Democratic hold		Swing		-2.78
Source: Elections Manitoba

=== 1981 ===
1981 Manitoba general election
Party	Candidate	Votes	%	±%
New Democratic	Laurent Desjardins	5,844	63.38%	8.67%
Liberal	Guy Savoie	1,925	20.88%	-0.91%
Progressive Conservative	Wes Rowson	1,346	14.60%	-8.91%
Progressive	Don Forsyth	106	1.15%	–
Total		9,221	–	–
Rejected		40	–	
Eligible voters / turnout		12,081	76.33%	5.59%
Source(s) Source: Manitoba. Chief Electoral Officer (1999). Statement of Votes for the 37th Provincial General Election, September 21, 2081 (PDF) (Report). Winnipeg: Elections Manitoba.

=== 1977 ===
1977 Manitoba general election
Party	Candidate	Votes	%	±%
New Democratic	Laurent Desjardins	4,266	54.71%	3.03%
Progressive Conservative	W. J. "Pete" Poitras	1,833	23.51%	18.24%
Liberal	George Ricard	1,699	21.79%	-21.27%
Total		7,798	–	–
Rejected		49	–	
Eligible voters / turnout		11,024	70.74%	–
Source(s) Source: Manitoba. Chief Electoral Officer (1999). Statement of Votes for the 37th Provincial General Election, September 21, 2079 (PDF) (Report). Winnipeg: Elections Manitoba.

=== 1974 by-election ===
Manitoba provincial by-election, 1974 Election of J. Paul Marion voided
Party	Candidate	Votes	%	±%
New Democratic	Laurent Desjardins	3,711	51.68%	1.68%
Liberal	J. Paul Marion	3,092	43.06%	-6.95%
Progressive Conservative	Paul J. A. Fredette	378	5.26%	–
Total		7,181	–	–
Rejected		N/A	–	
Eligible voters / turnout		N/A	–	–
Source(s) Source: Manitoba. Chief Electoral Officer (1999). Statement of Votes for the 37th Provincial General Election, September 21, 2077 (PDF) (Report). Winnipeg: Elections Manitoba.

=== 1973 ===
1973 Manitoba general election
Party	Candidate	Votes	%	±%
Liberal	J. Paul Marion	4,301	50.01%	-4.07%
New Democratic	Laurent Desjardins	4,300	49.99%	17.21%
Total		8,601	–	–
Rejected		75	–	
Eligible voters / turnout		11,294	76.16%	17.60%
Source(s) Source: Manitoba. Chief Electoral Officer (1999). Statement of Votes for the 37th Provincial General Election, September 21, 2075 (PDF) (Report). Winnipeg: Elections Manitoba.

=== 1969 ===
1969 Manitoba general election
Party	Candidate	Votes	%	±%
Liberal	Laurent Desjardins	3,365	54.07%	-5.14%
New Democratic	Kamil Michael "Kam" Gajdosik	2,040	32.78%	17.64%
Progressive Conservative	Maurice J. Arpin	818	13.14%	-12.50%
Total		6,223	–	–
Rejected		33	–	
Eligible voters / turnout		10,628	58.55%	-3.72%
Source(s) Source: Manitoba. Chief Electoral Officer (1999). Statement of Votes for the 37th Provincial General Election, September 21, 2072 (PDF) (Report). Winnipeg: Elections Manitoba.

=== 1966 ===
1966 Manitoba general election
Party	Candidate	Votes	%	±%
Liberal	Laurent Desjardins	4,040	59.21%	-2.42%
Progressive Conservative	Remi Lafreniere	1,750	25.65%	-2.95%
New Democratic	Maurice Paul	1,033	15.14%	5.37%
Total		6,823	–	–
Rejected		29	–	
Eligible voters / turnout		10,956	62.28%	0.30%
Source(s) Source: Manitoba. Chief Electoral Officer (1999). Statement of Votes for the 37th Provincial General Election, September 21, 2071 (PDF) (Report). Winnipeg: Elections Manitoba.

=== 1962 ===
1962 Manitoba general election
Party	Candidate	Votes	%	±%
Liberal	Laurent Desjardins	4,175	61.63%	–
Progressive Conservative	Brunelle Leveille	1,937	28.59%	-8.47%
New Democratic	Ian Wright	662	9.77%	–
Total		6,774	–	–
Rejected		34	–	
Eligible voters / turnout		10,930	61.98%	-9.23%
Source(s) Source: Manitoba. Chief Electoral Officer (1999). Statement of Votes for the 37th Provincial General Election, September 21, 2069 (PDF) (Report). Winnipeg: Elections Manitoba.

=== 1959 ===
1959 Manitoba general election
Party	Candidate	Votes	%	±%
Liberal–Progressive	Laurent Desjardins	3,772	46.72%	1.65%
Progressive Conservative	Harry De Leeuw	2,992	37.06%	-0.04%
Co-operative Commonwealth	Benjamin Cyr	1,309	16.21%	-1.60%
Total		8,073	–	–
Rejected		38	–	
Eligible voters / turnout		11,338	71.20%	8.96%
Source(s) Source: Manitoba. Chief Electoral Officer (1999). Statement of Votes for the 37th Provincial General Election, September 21, 2067 (PDF) (Report). Winnipeg: Elections Manitoba.

=== 1958 ===
1958 Manitoba general election
Party	Candidate	Votes	%	±%
Liberal–Progressive	Roger Teillet	3,178	45.08%	1.87%
Progressive Conservative	Harry De Leeuw	2,616	37.11%	24.25%
Co-operative Commonwealth	Ben Cyr	1,256	17.82%	-4.85%
Total		7,050	–	–
Rejected		41	–	
Eligible voters / turnout		11,327	62.24%	-16.72%
Source(s) Source: Manitoba. Chief Electoral Officer (1999). Statement of Votes for the 37th Provincial General Election, September 21, 2066 (PDF) (Report). Winnipeg: Elections Manitoba.

=== 1953 ===
1953 Manitoba general election
Party	Candidate	Votes	%	±%
Liberal–Progressive	Roger Teillet	6,220	24.20%	-20.58%
Liberal–Progressive	L. Raymond Fennell	4,886	19.01%	-25.77%
Co-operative Commonwealth	David Turner	4,497	17.49%	-19.16%
Independent Liberal	Joseph Van Belleghem	3,932	15.30%	–
Progressive Conservative	Raymond Hughes	2,568	9.99%	–
Social Credit	Antonio Lemoine	1,537	5.98%	–
Co-operative Commonwealth	Mrs. Kay E. MacKinnon	1,329	5.17%	-31.48%
Progressive Conservative	Louis Leger	737	2.87%	–
Total		25,706	–	–
Rejected		456	–	
Eligible voters / turnout		32,557	78.96%	29.92%
Source(s) Source: Manitoba. Chief Electoral Officer (1999). Statement of Votes for the 37th Provincial General Election, September 21, 2062 (PDF) (Report). Winnipeg: Elections Manitoba.

=== 1949 ===
1949 Manitoba general election
Party	Candidate	Votes	%	±%
Liberal–Progressive	Joseph Van Belleghem	3,936	26.77%	-3.88%
Co-operative Commonwealth	Edwin Hansford	3,905	26.56%	-20.19%
Independent Conservative	J. Paul Marion	2,730	18.57%	–
Liberal–Progressive	Gladstone P. Shearer	2,647	18.01%	-12.65%
Co-operative Commonwealth	Eariste R. Gagnon	1,483	10.09%	-36.66%
Total		14,701	–	–
Rejected		237	–	
Eligible voters / turnout		29,981	49.03%	-9.71%
Source(s) Source: Manitoba. Chief Electoral Officer (1999). Statement of Votes for the 37th Provincial General Election, September 21, 2059 (PDF) (Report). Winnipeg: Elections Manitoba.

=== 1945 ===
1945 Manitoba general election
Party	Candidate	Votes	%	±%
Co-operative Commonwealth	Edwin Hansford	6,605	46.75%	8.82%
Liberal–Progressive	Walter H. Tod	4,331	30.65%	-13.01%
Independent Liberal	Laurier Régnier	1,812	12.82%	–
Independent	Angus McDonald	898	6.36%	–
Labor–Progressive	Jules Jerome Pynoo	483	3.42%	–
Total		14,129	–	–
Rejected		209	–	
Eligible voters / turnout		24,052	58.74%	26.76%
Source(s) Source: Manitoba. Chief Electoral Officer (1999). Statement of Votes for the 37th Provincial General Election, September 21, 2057 (PDF) (Report). Winnipeg: Elections Manitoba.

=== 1941 ===
1941 Manitoba general election
Party	Candidate	Votes	%	±%
Liberal–Progressive	Austin Clarke	2,673	43.66%	11.90%
Co-operative Commonwealth	Edwin Hansford	2,322	37.93%	–
Social Credit	P. J. Tarbutt	1,127	18.41%	5.43%
Total		6,122	–	–
Rejected		216	–	
Eligible voters / turnout		19,140	31.99%	-44.05%
Source(s) Source: Manitoba. Chief Electoral Officer (1999). Statement of Votes for the 37th Provincial General Election, September 21, 2055 (PDF) (Report). Winnipeg: Elections Manitoba.

=== 1936 ===
1936 Manitoba general election
Party	Candidate	Votes	%	±%
Independent Labour	Harold Lawrence	4,620	34.65%	–
Liberal–Progressive	L. P. Gagnon	4,235	31.77%	6.52%
Conservative	George Campbell MacLean	2,747	20.60%	-11.10%
Social Credit	J. Fred Jodoin	1,730	12.98%	–
Total		13,332	–	–
Rejected		416	–	
Eligible voters / turnout		17,534	76.04%	-14.22%
Source(s) Source: Manitoba. Chief Electoral Officer (1999). Statement of Votes for the 37th Provincial General Election, September 21, 2054 (PDF) (Report). Winnipeg: Elections Manitoba.

=== 1932 ===
1932 Manitoba general election
Party	Candidate	Votes	%	±%
Labour	Harold Lawrence	4,954	35.13%	16.59%
Conservative	Joseph Bernier	4,470	31.70%	-1.70%
Liberal–Progressive	L. P. Gagnon	3,560	25.25%	–
Liberal	David Campbell	1,116	7.91%	-25.14%
Total		14,100	–	–
Rejected		N/A	–	
Eligible voters / turnout		15,623	90.25%	-0.88%
Source(s) Source: Manitoba. Chief Electoral Officer (1999). Statement of Votes for the 37th Provincial General Election, September 21, 2051 (PDF) (Report). Winnipeg: Elections Manitoba.

=== 1927 ===
1927 Manitoba general election
Party	Candidate	Votes	%	±%
Conservative	Joseph Bernier	2,646	33.40%	–
Liberal	L. P. Gagnon	2,618	33.05%	5.85%
Labour	Marcus Hyman	1,469	18.55%	-7.45%
Progressive	H. Laurendeau	1,188	15.00%	–
Total		7,921	–	–
Rejected		N/A	–	
Eligible voters / turnout		8,692	91.13%	24.18%
Source(s) Source: Manitoba. Chief Electoral Officer (1999). Statement of Votes for the 37th Provincial General Election, September 21, 2047 (PDF) (Report). Winnipeg: Elections Manitoba.

The vote count was controversial — Liberal candidate L.P. Gagnon was initially declared the winner by one vote, but a recount put Bernier with more votes.

=== 1922 ===
1922 Manitoba general election
Party	Candidate	Votes	%	±%
Independent	Joseph Bernier	2,024	46.81%	–
Liberal	Hector Mackenzie Sutherland	1,176	27.20%	-12.76%
Labour	Charles W. Foster	1,124	25.99%	–
Total		4,324	–	–
Rejected		N/A	–	
Eligible voters / turnout		6,459	66.95%	-1.04%
Source(s) Source: Manitoba. Chief Electoral Officer (1999). Statement of Votes for the 37th Provincial General Election, September 21, 2044 (PDF) (Report). Winnipeg: Elections Manitoba.

=== 1920 ===
1920 Manitoba general election
Party	Candidate	Votes	%	±%
Conservative	Joseph Bernier	1,434	34.27%	0.66%
Liberal	John Power Howden	942	22.51%	-16.67%
Liberal	Joseph Dumas	730	17.44%	-21.73%
Independent	Christopher R. Rice	675	16.13%	–
Independent	Tony Hoornaert	404	9.65%	–
Total		4,185	–	–
Rejected		N/A	–	
Eligible voters / turnout		6,156	67.98%	-10.12%
Source(s) Source: Manitoba. Chief Electoral Officer (1999). Statement of Votes for the 37th Provincial General Election, September 21, 2042 (PDF) (Report). Winnipeg: Elections Manitoba.

=== 1915 ===
1915 Manitoba general election
Party	Candidate	Votes	%	±%
Liberal	Joseph Dumas	921	39.17%	-4.82%
Conservative	Joseph Alexandre Beaupre	790	33.60%	-22.41%
Independent	John Power Howden	640	27.22%	–
Total		2,351	–	–
Rejected		N/A	–	
Eligible voters / turnout		3,010	78.11%	-8.25%
Source(s) Source: Manitoba. Chief Electoral Officer (1999). Statement of Votes for the 37th Provincial General Election, September 21, 2038 (PDF) (Report). Winnipeg: Elections Manitoba.

=== 1914 ===
1914 Manitoba general election
Party	Candidate	Votes	%	±%
Conservative	Joseph Bernier	1,603	56.01%	–
Liberal	Louis Alfred Delorme	1,259	43.99%	–
Total		2,862	–	–
Rejected		N/A	–	
Eligible voters / turnout		3,314	86.36%	–
Source(s) Source: Manitoba. Chief Electoral Officer (1999). Statement of Votes for the 37th Provincial General Election, September 21, 2037 (PDF) (Report). Winnipeg: Elections Manitoba.

=== 1913 by-election ===
Manitoba provincial by-election, 1913
Party	Candidate	Votes	%	±%
Conservative	Joseph Bernier	Acclaimed	–	–
Total			–	–
Rejected		N/A	–	
Eligible voters / turnout		N/A	–	–
Source(s) Source: Manitoba. Chief Electoral Officer (1999). Statement of Votes for the 37th Provincial General Election, September 21, 2034 (PDF) (Report). Winnipeg: Elections Manitoba.

=== 1910 ===
1910 Manitoba general election
Party	Candidate	Votes	%	±%
Conservative	Joseph Bernier	1,022	57.35%	4.69%
Liberal	Albert Dubuc	760	42.65%	-4.69%
Total		1,782	–	–
Rejected		N/A	–	
Eligible voters / turnout		2,500	71.28%	-9.69%
Source(s) Source: Manitoba. Chief Electoral Officer (1999). Statement of Votes for the 37th Provincial General Election, September 21, 2033 (PDF) (Report). Winnipeg: Elections Manitoba.

=== 1907 ===
1907 Manitoba general election
Party	Candidate	Votes	%	±%
Conservative	Joseph Bernier	753	52.66%	2.70%
Liberal	Horace Chevrier	677	47.34%	-2.70%
Total		1,430	–	–
Rejected		N/A	–	
Eligible voters / turnout		1,766	80.97%	-8.19%
Source(s) Source: Manitoba. Chief Electoral Officer (1999). Statement of Votes for the 37th Provincial General Election, September 21, 2030 (PDF) (Report). Winnipeg: Elections Manitoba.

=== 1903 ===
1903 Manitoba general election
Party	Candidate	Votes	%	±%
Liberal	Horace Chevrier	593	50.04%	–
Conservative	Joseph Bernier	592	49.96%	–
Total		1,185	–	–
Rejected		N/A	–	
Eligible voters / turnout		1,329	89.16%	–
Source(s) Source: Manitoba. Chief Electoral Officer (1999). Statement of Votes for the 37th Provincial General Election, September 21, 2026 (PDF) (Report). Winnipeg: Elections Manitoba.

=== 1900 by-election ===
Manitoba provincial by-election, 1900
Party	Candidate	Votes	%	±%
Government	Joseph Bernier	436	60.72%	–
Independent	Victor Mager	282	39.28%	–
Total		718	–	–
Rejected		N/A	–	
Eligible voters / turnout		N/A	–	–
Source(s) Source: Manitoba. Chief Electoral Officer (1999). Statement of Votes for the 37th Provincial General Election, September 21, 2023 (PDF) (Report). Winnipeg: Elections Manitoba.

=== 1899 ===
1899 Manitoba general election
Party	Candidate	Votes	%	±%
Liberal	S. A. D. Bertrand	393	51.64%	–
Conservative	Jean-Baptiste Lauzon	368	48.36%	–
Total		761	–	–
Rejected		N/A	–	
Eligible voters / turnout		1,129	67.40%	–
Source(s) Source: Manitoba. Chief Electoral Officer (1999). Statement of Votes for the 37th Provincial General Election, September 21, 2022 (PDF) (Report). Winnipeg: Elections Manitoba.

=== 1897 by-election ===
Manitoba provincial by-election, 1897
Party	Candidate	Votes	%	±%
Opposition	Jean-Baptiste Lauzon	288	58.06%	–
Government	S. A. D. Bertrand	208	41.94%	–
Total		496	–	–
Rejected		N/A	–	
Eligible voters / turnout		N/A	–	–
Source(s) Source: Manitoba. Chief Electoral Officer (1999). Statement of Votes for the 37th Provincial General Election, September 21, 2021 (PDF) (Report). Winnipeg: Elections Manitoba.

=== 1896 ===
1896 Manitoba general election
Party	Candidate	Votes	%	±%
Liberal	James Prendergast	357	56.22%	–
Conservative	Jean-Baptiste Lauzon	278	43.78%	-6.14%
Total		635	–	–
Rejected		N/A	–	
Eligible voters / turnout		860	73.84%	-126.48%
Source(s) Source: Manitoba. Chief Electoral Officer (1999). Statement of Votes for the 37th Provincial General Election, September 21, 2020 (PDF) (Report). Winnipeg: Elections Manitoba.

=== 1892 ===
1892 Manitoba general election
Party	Candidate	Votes	%	±%
Liberal–Conservative	James Prendergast	313	50.08%	–
Conservative	Roger Marion	312	49.92%	-2.08%
Total		625	–	–
Rejected		N/A	–	
Eligible voters / turnout		312	200.32%	–
Source(s) Source: Manitoba. Chief Electoral Officer (1999). Statement of Votes for the 37th Provincial General Election, September 21, 2017 (PDF) (Report). Winnipeg: Elections Manitoba.

=== 1888 ===
1888 Manitoba general election
Party	Candidate	Votes	%	±%
Conservative	Roger Marion	182	52.00%	–
Liberal	Joseph Ernest Cyr	168	48.00%	–
Total		350	–	–
Rejected		N/A	–	
Eligible voters / turnout		N/A	–	–
Source(s) Source: Manitoba. Chief Electoral Officer (1999). Statement of Votes for the 37th Provincial General Election, September 21, 2013 (PDF) (Report). Winnipeg: Elections Manitoba.

=== 1886 ===
1886 Manitoba general election
Party	Candidate	Votes	%	±%
Conservative	Alphonse Alfred Clément Larivière	Acclaimed	–	–
Total			–	–
Rejected		N/A	–	
Eligible voters / turnout		734	–	–
Source(s) Source: Manitoba. Chief Electoral Officer (1999). Statement of Votes for the 37th Provincial General Election, September 21, 2012 (PDF) (Report). Winnipeg: Elections Manitoba.

=== 1883 ===
1883 Manitoba general election
Party	Candidate	Votes	%	±%
Conservative	Alphonse Alfred Clément Larivière	97	68.79%	–
Liberal	Edward Richard	44	31.21%	–
Total		141	–	–
Rejected		N/A	–	
Eligible voters / turnout		N/A	–	–
Source(s) Source: Manitoba. Chief Electoral Officer (1999). Statement of Votes for the 37th Provincial General Election, September 21, 2009 (PDF) (Report). Winnipeg: Elections Manitoba.

=== 1882 by-election ===
Manitoba provincial by-election, 1882
Party	Candidate	Votes	%	±%
Conservative	Alphonse Alfred Clément Larivière	Acclaimed	–	–
Total			–	–
Rejected		N/A	–	
Eligible voters / turnout		N/A	–	–
Source(s) Source: Manitoba. Chief Electoral Officer (1999). Statement of Votes for the 37th Provincial General Election, September 21, 2007 (PDF) (Report). Winnipeg: Elections Manitoba.

=== 1879 ===
1879 Manitoba general election
Party	Candidate	Votes	%	±%
Liberal–Conservative	Alphonse Alfred Clément Larivière	122	97.60%	–
Undeclared	Joseph-Alfred-Norbert Provencher	3	2.40%	–
Total		125	–	–
Rejected		N/A	–	
Eligible voters / turnout		125	100.00%	
Source(s) Source: Manitoba. Chief Electoral Officer (1999). Statement of Votes for the 37th Provincial General Election, September 21, 2005 (PDF) (Report). Winnipeg: Elections Manitoba.

=== 1878 ===
1878 Manitoba general election
Party	Candidate	Votes	%	±%
Undeclared	Alphonse Alfred Clément Larivière	Acclaimed	–	–
Total			–	–
Rejected		N/A	–	
Eligible voters / turnout		318	0.00%	–
Source(s) Source: Manitoba. Chief Electoral Officer (1999). Statement of Votes for the 37th Provincial General Election, September 21, 2004 (PDF) (Report). Winnipeg: Elections Manitoba.

=== 1874 ===
1874 Manitoba general election
Party	Candidate	Votes	%
Government	Marc-Amable Girard	Acclaimed	–
Total			–
Rejected		N/A	–
Eligible voters / turnout		N/A	–
Source(s) Source: Manitoba. Chief Electoral Officer (1999). Statement of Votes for the 37th Provincial General Election, September 21, 2000 (PDF) (Report). Winnipeg: Elections Manitoba.

== Previous boundaries ==
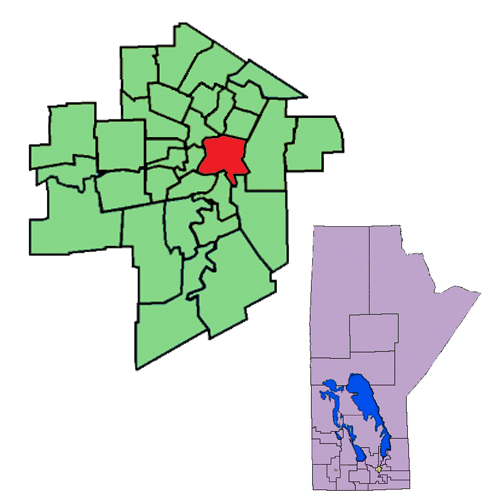
The 1999–2011 boundaries for St. Boniface highlighted in red.

== See also ==
- List of Manitoba provincial electoral districts
- Canadian provincial electoral districts
