= List of members of the Canadian House of Commons with military service (J) =

Name	Elected party	Constituency	Elected date	Military service
Harry Jackman	National Government	Rosedale	March 26, 1940	Royal Air Force (1918)
John Mason James	Liberal	Durham	June 27, 1949	Canadian Army (1940-1945)
Bud Jardine	Progressive Conservative	Northumberland—Miramichi	September 4, 1984	Canadian Army (1951-1954), Royal Canadian Navy (1954-1968), Canadian Forces Maritime Command (1968-1984)
John Theophilus Jenkins	Liberal-Conservative	Queen's County	June 20, 1882	Turkish Army (1854-1856)
Merv Johnson	Cooperative Commonwealth Federation	Kindersley	August 10, 1953	Canadian Army (1944-1945)
Thomas George Johnston	Liberal	Lambton West	December 14, 1898	Militia (1866)
Alfred Gilpin Jones	Anti-Confederate	Halifax	September 20, 1867	Militia
David Ford Jones	Conservative	Leeds South	January 22, 1874	Militia (1837-1867)
Henry Frank Jones	Progressive Conservative	Saskatoon	June 10, 1957	Royal Canadian Air Force (1941-1945)
Leonard C. Jones	Independent	Moncton	July 8, 1974	Royal Canadian Air Force
Owen Lewis Jones	Cooperative Commonwealth Federation	Yale	May 31, 1948	British Army (1914-1918)
Warner H. Jorgenson	Progressive Conservative	Provencher	June 10, 1957	Canadian Army (1940-1946)
Douglas Jung	Progressive Conservative	Vancouver Centre	June 10, 1957	Canadian Army (1943-1946)
Alex Jupp	Progressive Conservative	Mississauga North	May 22, 1979	Canadian Army (1944-1946)
René Jutras	Liberal	Provencher	March 26, 1940	Royal Canadian Air Force
