= Canada Party candidates in the 1993 Canadian federal election =

The short-lived Canada Party fielded a number of candidates in the 1993 Canadian federal election, none of whom were elected. Information about these candidates may be found here.

== Manitoba ==
=== Brandon—Souris: George H. Armstrong ===
Armstrong, a journalist, received 82 votes (0.22%) for an eighth-place finish against Liberal candidate Glen McKinnon.

=== Provencher: Ted Bezan ===
Ted Bezan is a former machine operator who described himself as retired in 1993. He ran for the Social Credit Party of Canada twice in the 1960s and 1970s. He criticized the major parties' focus on deficit reduction in the 1993 federal election, and instead called for the Bank of Canada to issue interest-free loans to pay down the interest on Canada's national debt.

In 1994, he argued that the Royal Canadian Legion's policy against headgear was not racist and should be left in place. Some Sikh groups had previously argued that the policy was exclusionary. The following year, Bezan complained that recent translations of the Christian Bible were removing vital passages. He has also called for the Bank of Canada to buy Canada's debt, or at least half of it, from its current owners.

Electoral record
Election	Division	Party	Votes	%	Place	Winner
1963 federal	Waterloo South	Social Credit	372		4/4	Gordon Chaplin, Progressive Conservative
1974 federal	Portage	Social Credit	179		4/5	Peter Masniuk, Progressive Conservative
1993 federal	Provencher	Canada Party	69	0.19	7/7	David Iftody, Liberal

=== Portage—Lisgar: Hans C. Kjear ===
Kjear, a farmer, received 83 votes (0.23%) for an eighth-place finish against Liberal candidate Jon Gerrard.

=== Winnipeg South: Bill Martens ===
Martens is a lawyer. He received 44 votes (0.08%), finishing ninth against Liberal candidate Reg Alcock.

=== Winnipeg—Transcona: Bill Tataryn ===
Tataryn was a retired police officer. He received 39 votes (0.09%), finishing ninth against New Democratic Party incumbent Bill Blaikie. The Winnipeg Free Press newspaper printed an obituary notice for a "William Tataryn" in 1998, although it is not clear if this was the same person.
