= Joseph Bernier =

Canadian politician (1874–1951)

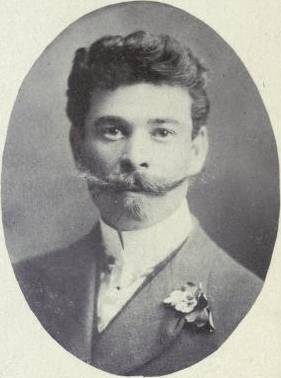

Member of the Legislative Assembly of Manitoba for St. Boniface
- In office 1900–1903, 1907–1915, 1920–1926, 1927–1932

Personal details
- Born: August 16, 1874 St. Jean d'Iberville, Québec
- Died: June 8, 1951 (aged 76) Montreal, Quebec

Joseph Bernier (August 16, 1874 – June 8, 1951) was a politician in Manitoba, Canada. He served in the Legislative Assembly of Manitoba on four occasions between 1900 and 1932. Bernier was a member of the Conservative Party, and served as a cabinet minister in the government of Rodmond Roblin. His father, Thomas A. Bernier, was a member of the Senate of Canada.

Bernier was born in St. Jean d'Iberville, Québec, and educated at St. Boniface College and the Manitoba University. He received a Master of Arts degree. Bernier was called to the Manitoba bar in 1896 and began practising as a barrister-at-law in Winnipeg in 1897. He was first elected to the Manitoba legislature in a by-election held on November 24, 1900, defeating Victor Mager by 154 votes in the St. Boniface constituency. He lost his seat in the 1903 provincial election, losing to Liberal Horace Chevrier by a single vote.

Bernier was re-elected to the legislature in the 1907 election, defeating Chevrier by 71 votes. Returned without difficulty in the 1910 campaign, he was appointed to cabinet on May 22, 1913 as Provincial Secretary.

Bernier was again re-elected in the 1914 provincial election. Early in 1915, the entire Roblin administration was forced to resign after the Lieutenant Governor issued a report which found the government had been guilty of corrupt practices in the tendering of contracts for new legislative buildings. Bernier did not seek re-election in the 1915 campaign, and the St. Boniface constituency was won by Liberal Joseph Dumas.

Bernier returned to the legislature for a third time in the 1920 provincial election, defeating Dumas and three other candidates. He identified himself as an independent during this period, but was still widely regarded as being in sympathy with the Conservative Party. He was again returned in the 1922 campaign, once again identifying himself as an independent.

Bernier resigned from the legislature on September 1, 1926 to campaign for the House of Commons of Canada in the 1926 federal election. He ran as a candidate of the Conservative Party of Canada in the federal riding of St. Boniface, and lost to Liberal John Power Howden by 2,668 votes.

Bernier ran again for the provincial constituency of St. Boniface in the 1927 provincial election, this time as an official candidate of the Manitoba Conservative Party. This campaign ended in controversy, with a ballot-counting process marred by confusion and error. Liberal candidate L.P. Gagnon was initially declared the winner by one vote, but a recount saw Bernier confirmed as the victor. He returned to the legislature, and rejoined the Conservative caucus on the opposition benches. He was expelled from the legislature for a month in 1928, after being named by the Speaker.

Bernier lost his seat for the final time in the 1932 campaign, falling to Labour candidate Harold Lawrence by 504 votes. He actually won a plurality of votes on the first count, but fell behind on transfers, Lawrence proving to be the more popular overall choice of voters. (Manitoba used Instant-runoff voting for elections in St. Boniface during this period).

From 1900 to 1917, Bernier was editor for the francophone newspaper Le Manitoba. In 1910, he married Rose Marie Bernier. Bernier was an honorary colonel with the Canadian Expeditionary Force during World War I and helped with recruiting.

After leaving politics, he served as a county court judge from 1933 to 1949.

Bernier died in hospital in Montreal at the age of 76.

== Electoral history ==
1926 Canadian federal election: Saint Boniface—Saint Vital
Party	Candidate	Votes	%	±%
Liberal	John Power Howden	5,903	51.0	+3.6
Conservative	Joseph Bernier	3,235	28.0	+3.9
Labour	Allan Meikle	2,427	21.0	-7.6
Total valid votes		11,565	100.0	
