= Results breakdown of the 1997 Canadian federal election =

Canadian election results

1997 Canadian federal election

== Results by Province ==
=== Alberta ===
Results in Alberta
Party	Seats	Second	Third	Fourth	Fifth	Sixth	Seventh	Eighth	Ninth	Tenth	Votes	%	+/-
Reform	22	4									629,402	52.28	
Liberals	4	15	7								301,774	25.07	
Progressive Conservative		7	17	2							175,556	14.58	
NDP			1	21	4						49,097	4.08	
National			1	2	15	1					28,637	2.38	
Natural Law					3	12	9	1			6,748	0.56	
Independent				1		4		4	2	1	5,280	0.44	
Green					2	4	4	2			3,316	0.28	
Christian Heritage					1	3		1			2,071	0.17	
Canada Party					1	1	3	2	2		1,298	0.11	
No affiliation to a recognised party						1		4			478	0.04	
Marxist–Leninist							1		1		172	0.01	
Total	26										1,203,829	100.0	

=== British Columbia ===
Results in British Columbia
Party	Seats	Second	Third	Fourth	Fifth	Sixth	Seventh	Eighth	Ninth	Tenth	Eleventh	Twelfth	Thirteenth	Votes	%	+/-
Reform	24	5	3											593,599	36.37	
Liberals	6	22	4											458,802	28.11	
NDP	2	4	13	13										252,257	15.46	
Progressive Conservative		1	12	18	1									219,838	13.47	
National				1	28	1								66,773	4.09	
Green						13	9	2						11,997	0.74	
Natural Law					1	7	14	10						9,845	0.6	
Christian Heritage					2	7	2	1	2					7,282	0.45	
Libertarian						3	3	4	4		1			4,251	0.26	
Independent							3	6	9	7	5	3	3	4,074	0.25	
Canada Party						1		6	5	2	1			1,676	0.1	
No affiliation to a recognised party								2	1	2	1			682	0.04	
Commonwealth of Canada							1		2	4		3	1	601	0.04	
Marxist–Leninist									1		2	2		317	0.02	
Total	32													1,631,994	100.0	

=== Manitoba ===
Results in Manitoba
Party	Seats	Second	Third	Fourth	Fifth	Sixth	Seventh	Eighth	Ninth	Votes	%	+/-
Liberals	12	2								243,214	44.95	
Reform	1	8	4	1						120,934	22.35	
NDP	1	4	1	7	1					90,091	16.65	
Progressive Conservative			9	5						64,515	11.92	
National				1	10	2				16,516	3.05	
Natural Law						7	4			1,993	0.37	
Christian Heritage					2	2				1,500	0.28	
Canada Party					1	1	3	4	4	1,424	0.26	
Independent							3			288	0.05	
Marxist–Leninist								4		214	0.04	
No affiliation to a recognised party								2		186	0.03	
Libertarian							2			181	0.03	
Total	14									541,056	100.0	

=== New Brunswick ===
Results in New Brunswick
Party	Seats	Second	Third	Fourth	Fifth	Sixth	Seventh	Eighth	Votes	%	+/-
Liberals	9	1							215,769	56.03	
Progressive Conservative	1	9							107,583	27.94	
Reform			6	1					32,628	8.47	
NDP			3	6	1				18,694	4.85	
Independent			1		1				4,943	1.28	
Natural Law				1	1	1	1		1,904	0.49	
National				1	1			1	1,317	0.34	
Canada Party					1	2			1,039	0.27	
Christian Heritage					2				996	0.26	
No affiliation to a recognised party							1		226	0.06	
Total	10								385,099	100.0	

=== Newfoundland and Labrador ===
Results in Newfoundland and Labrador
Party	Seats	Second	Third	Fourth	Fifth	Sixth	Seventh	Votes	%	+/-
Liberals	7							155,237	67.32	
Progressive Conservative		7						61,488	26.67	
NDP			7					8,080	3.5	
Reform				2				2,392	1.04	
Natural Law				3	1	1		1,809	0.78	
National					1			1,235	0.54	
Christian Heritage							1	349	0.15	
Total	7							230,590	100.0	

=== Northwest Territories ===
Results in Northwest Territories
Party	Seats	Second	Third	Fourth	Fifth	Sixth	Votes	%	+/-
Liberals	2						15,552	65.42	
Progressive Conservative		1	1				3,863	16.25	
Reform		1					2,000	8.41	
NDP			1	1			1,820	7.66	
Green					1		325	1.37	
Natural Law						1	213	0.9	
Total	2						23,773	100.0	

=== Nova Scotia ===
Results in Nova Scotia
Party	Seats	Second	Third	Fourth	Fifth	Sixth	Seventh	Eighth	Ninth	Tenth	Votes	%	+/-
Liberals	11										235,684	51.98	
Progressive Conservative		11									106,411	23.47	
Reform			8	3							60,377	13.32	
NDP			2	8	1						30,907	6.82	
Independent			1					1	1		9,334	2.06	
National					6		1				5,127	1.13	
Natural Law					3	7		1			3,947	0.87	
Christian Heritage					1	1					1,216	0.27	
Green							1				307	0.07	
Marxist–Leninist										1	84	0.02	
Total	11										453,394	100.0	

=== Ontario ===
Results in Ontario
Party	Seats	Second	Third	Fourth	Fifth	Sixth	Seventh	Eighth	Ninth	Tenth	Eleventh	Twelfth	Votes	%	+/-
Liberals	98	1											2,583,065	52.93	
Reform	1	57	35	5									982,691	20.14	
Progressive Conservative		28	62	8	1								859,596	17.61	
NDP		11	2	81	5								291,658	5.98	
National				1	59	12	2						56,977	1.17	
Independent		2		3	3	9	12	7	6	2	1		36,275	0.74	
Natural Law					12	26	37	11	2				25,939	0.53	
Christian Heritage				1	11	7	3	2					15,010	0.31	
Green					6	17	8	3					13,213	0.27	
Libertarian						11	4	11	3				7,890	0.16	
Abolitionist						4	8	9	12	9	7	1	2,931	0.06	
Marxist–Leninist						4	1	10	9	4	1		2,559	0.05	
No affiliation to a recognised party						2	2	2			1		1,100	0.02	
Commonwealth of Canada						1	2	2	5	2		1	681	0.01	
Canada Party								1	3	1			631	0.01	
Total	99												4,880,216	100.0	

=== Prince Edward Island ===
Results in Prince Edward Island
Party	Seats	Second	Third	Fourth	Fifth	Sixth	Seventh	Votes	%	+/-
Liberals	4							43,412	60.11	
Progressive Conservative		4						23,126	32.02	
NDP			4					3,731	5.17	
Reform				1				744	1.03	
Christian Heritage				1		1		487	0.67	
National					1			350	0.48	
Green					1			249	0.34	
Natural Law							1	123	0.17	
Total	4							72,222	100.0	

=== Quebec ===
Results in Quebec
Party	Seats	Second	Third	Fourth	Fifth	Sixth	Seventh	Eighth	Ninth	Tenth	Eleventh	Twelfth	Votes	%	+/-
Bloc Québécois	54	21											1,846,024	49.3	
Liberals	19	44	12										1,235,868	33.01	
Progressive Conservative	1	10	61	3									506,683	13.53	
NDP				48	23	3							57,339	1.53	
Independent	1		1	3	4	2	2	2	2	1			32,937	0.88	
Natural Law				17	20	8	2						30,972	0.83	
No affiliation to a recognised party			1										8,930	0.24	
Abolitionist				1	2	11	7	3	4	1		1	6,210	0.17	
Commonwealth of Canada					6	5	12	7	3	1	1		6,034	0.16	
National				1	2	5	4	2					4,939	0.13	
Green				2	2	2							3,572	0.1	
Libertarian					1	2	2	1					2,308	0.06	
Marxist–Leninist						6	1	2			1		1,790	0.05	
Christian Heritage					1				1				595	0.02	
Total	75												3,744,201	100.0	

=== Saskatchewan ===
Results in Saskatchewan
Party	Seats	Second	Third	Fourth	Fifth	Sixth	Seventh	Eighth	Ninth	Votes	%	+/-
Liberals	5	6	3							156,216	32.09	
Reform	4	4	5	1						132,587	27.23	
NDP	5	4	5							129,649	26.63	
Progressive Conservative			1	12	1					55,197	11.34	
National					7	1				5,084	1.04	
Independent				1	2	2	2	2		4,600	0.94	
Canada Party						6	2	2	1	1,438	0.3	
Natural Law					2	3	1			1,250	0.26	
Christian Heritage					1		1			791	0.16	
No affiliation to a recognised party									1	60	0.01	
Total	14									486,872	100.0	

=== Yukon ===
Results in Yukon
Party	Seats	Second	Third	Fourth	Fifth	Sixth	Votes	%	+/-
NDP	1						6,252	43.34	
Liberals		1					3,359	23.29	
Progressive Conservative			1				2,566	17.79	
Reform				1			1,891	13.11	
National					1		296	2.05	
Christian Heritage						1	61	0.42	
Total	1						14,425	100.0	
