= Dean Whiteway =

Canadian politician (born 1944)

Dean Waldon Whiteway (born July 20, 1944) is a Canadian politician. He served in the House of Commons of Canada from 1974 to 1979, as a member of the Progressive Conservative Party.

== Early life and career ==
Whiteway was born in Shelburne, Nova Scotia, and has a Bachelor of Arts degree from Brandon University in Manitoba and a Master's degree from Harvard. He has taught at Providence Bible College and Seminary near Winnipeg. Whiteway is a Mennonite Brethren, and a member of the Evangelical Fellowship of Canada.

== Member of Parliament ==
Whiteway first ran for the House of Commons in the 1968 election as a Social Credit candidate in Dauphin, and finished fourth against Progressive Conservative Gordon Ritchie. He joined the Progressive Conservative Party after the election, and ran under its banner in Selkirk in the 1972 election. He narrowly lost to incumbent New Democrat Doug Rowland.

He was elected on his third attempt, defeating Rowland in a 1974 election rematch. The Liberal Party of Canada won a majority government in the 1974 election, and Whiteway entered parliament as a member of the official opposition. He was on the right wing of his party, and opposed abortion, supported capital punishment, and spoke against federal funding for Planned Parenthood. On one occasion, he suggested that danger to a woman's health should be removed as permissible grounds for abortion. He also gained some notoriety for pitching a tent on Parliament Hill to protest a post office closing in his riding.

The Selkirk riding was eliminated by redistribution for the 1979 federal election. Whiteway was forced to seek reelection in the more challenging riding of Winnipeg—Birds Hill. He lost to New Democratic Party candidate Bill Blaikie, even though the Progressive Conservatives won a minority government.

== Reform Party activist ==
Whiteway campaigned for the No side in the 1992 Charlottetown Accord referendum. He sought a return to the House of Commons in the 1993 election, after winning a four-person contest for the Reform Party nomination in Provencher. Whiteway argued that the Reform Party was a natural home for evangelical Christians, and spoke of bringing "some moral fibre to Parliament". He lost to Liberal David Iftody, and told reporters that he would probably not run for public office again.

Whiteway was involved in abortive plans to create a provincial branch of the Reform Party in 1994. He indicated that he had no interest in becoming a candidate himself.

== Headmaster ==
After the election of 1993, Whiteway worked for Kitchen Craft Cabinetry, and relocated to Edmonton, Alberta. He then moved to British Columbia, where he served as the Headmaster of Kamloops Christian School. In 1998, he accepted a position as headmaster of Faith Heritage, a private and non-denominational Christian school in Syracuse, New York. In 2007, he became headmaster of Plumstead Christian School in Plumsteadville, Pennsylvania, where, as of July 2010 he served as Chancellor. In September 2011, Whiteway served as Headmaster of Concord Christian Academy in Concord, New Hampshire.

== Retirement ==
After leaving his position in New Hampshire, Whiteway moved to Savannah, GA. After teaching American Government, and, History, at the college and high school level, Whiteway retired. Whiteway now focuses on spending time with his grandchildren and painting.

== Electoral record ==
1993 Canadian federal election: Provencher
Party	Candidate	Votes	%	±%	Expenditures
Liberal	David Iftody	16,119	44.04	+11.5	$42,045
Reform	Dean Whiteway	13,463	36.78	+33.1	$49,513
Progressive Conservative	Kelly Clark	3,765	10.29	−45.2	$48,359
New Democratic	Martha Wiebe Owen	1,818	4.97	−2.3	$7,277
National	Wes Penner	1,212	3.3		$23,719
Natural Law	Corrine Ayotte	157	0.43	+0.1	$12
Canada Party	Ted Bezan	69	0.19	–	$0
Total valid votes		36,603	100.00		
Total rejected ballots		126	0.34	+0.0	
Turnout		36,729	69.52	−1.4	
Electors on the lists		52,835			
Source: Thirty-fifth General Election, 1993: Official Voting Results, Published by the Chief Electoral Officer of Canada. Financial figures taken from official contributions and expenses provided by Elections Canada.
