= Alphonse Alfred Clément Larivière =

Canadian politician (1842–1925)

The Honourable Alphonse Alfred Clément Larivière
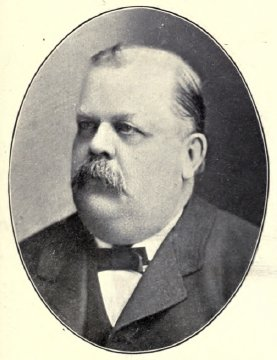

Canadian Senator from Manitoba
- In office 1911–1917
- Appointed by: Robert Borden

Member of Parliament for Provencher
- In office 1889–1904
- Preceded by: Joseph Royal
- Succeeded by: Joseph Ernest Cyr

Member of the Legislative Assembly of Manitoba for St. Boniface
- In office 1878–1888

Personal details
- Born: July 24, 1842 Montreal, Quebec, Canada East
- Died: September 20, 1925 (aged 83) St. Boniface, Manitoba, Canada
- Party: Conservative

Alphonse Alfred Clément Larivière (July 24, 1842 – September 20, 1925) was a Canadian politician and journalist.

== Biography ==
Born in Montreal, Canada East, the son of Abraham C. Larivière and Adelaide Marcil, he was educated at the Collège Saint-Marie and the Montreal School of Military Instruction there. In 1867, he married Marie Melvina Bourdeau. Larivière served in the militia in both Quebec and Manitoba. He was president of the Quebec Board of Arts and Manufactures. Larivière served in the Dominion Lands Office at Winnipeg from 1871 to 1875. He was a special correspondent for La Minerve in Montreal and later became chief editor for Le Manitoba. In 1874, he was named a justice of the peace for Selkirk County.

Larivière ran unsuccessfully for a seat in the Manitoba assembly in 1874. He was a member of the Legislative Assembly of Manitoba from 1878 to 1888 and served as Provincial Secretary, Minister of Agriculture, Provincial Treasurer, and Provincial Lands Commissioner. In an 1889 by-election held after Joseph Royal was named lieutenant-governor for the Northwest Territories, he was elected to the House of Commons of Canada for the electoral district of Provencher. A Conservative, he was re-elected in 1891, 1896, and 1900. He was defeated in 1904 and 1908. In 1911, he was summoned to the Senate of Canada representing the senatorial division of Provencher, Manitoba on the advice of Robert Borden. He served until 1917.

He also served as president of the Selkirk County Agricultural Society and superintendent of Catholic schools. Larivière was a director of the Commercial Bank of Manitoba and the Red River Bridge Company. He was founder and first president for the Association Jean-Baptiste du Manitoba. He founded La Société de Colonisation du Manitoba in 1874 and was its first president. He also served on the council for the University of Manitoba.

Larivière died in St. Boniface at the age of 83.

== Electoral history ==
1908 Canadian federal election: Provencher
Party	Candidate	Votes	%	±%
Liberal	John Patrick Molloy	2,719	54.6	+4.5
Conservative	Alphonse-Alfred-Clément Larivière	2,259	45.4	-4.5
Total valid votes		4,978	100.0	

1904 Canadian federal election: Provencher
Party	Candidate	Votes	%	±%
Liberal	Joseph-Ernest Cyr	1,896	50.1	+0.9
Conservative	Alphonse-Alfred-Clément Larivière	1,886	49.9	-0.9
Total valid votes		3,782	100.0	

1900 Canadian federal election: Provencher
Party	Candidate	Votes	%	±%
Conservative	Alphonse-Alfred-Clément Larivière	1,528	50.7	-13.8
Liberal	S.A.D. Bertrand	1,484	49.3	+13.8
Total valid votes		3,012	100.0	

1896 Canadian federal election: Provencher
Party	Candidate	Votes	%
Conservative	Alphonse-Alfred-Clément Larivière	1,476	64.6
Liberal	George Walton	810	35.4
Total valid votes		2,286	100.0

1891 Canadian federal election: Provencher
Party	Candidate	Votes
Conservative	Alphonse-Alfred-Clément Larivière	acclaimed

Canadian federal by-election, 24 January 1889
Party	Candidate	Votes	%	±%
On Mr. Royal being appointed Lieutenant-Governor of the North West Territories
Conservative	Alphonse-Alfred-Clément Larivière	797	48.3	-9.8
Unknown	Richard	583	35.4	–
Unknown	Clarke	269	16.3	–
Total valid votes		1,649	100.0	
