= J. Paul Marion =

Canadian politician

Member of the Manitoba Assembly for St. Boniface
- In office June 28, 1973 – December 20, 1974

Personal details
- Born: Joseph Paul Marion; December 8, 1927 Saint Boniface, Manitoba, Canada
- Died: January 15, 2023 (aged 95)
- Party: Manitoba Liberal Party
- Occupation: Businessman

Joseph Paul Marion (December 8, 1927 – January 15, 2023) was politician from Manitoba, Canada. He was briefly a Liberal Party member of the Legislative Assembly of Manitoba during the 1970s, for the riding of St. Boniface.

Marion was born in St. Boniface, Manitoba, and was educated at the Angus School of Commerce and Ryerson Polytechnical Institute. He was a successful businessman before entering political life, and served as a company president.

He served as a school trustee from 1967 to 1970, and was a councilor and acting mayor of Winnipeg in 1972–1973. Marion was a founder of Club d'Hommes d'Affaires Franco-Manitobain.

In the 1973 provincial election, he was elected over Liberal-turned-New Democratic Party incumbent Laurent Desjardins by a single vote. His election was overturned, however, and he lost to Desjardins by 618 votes in a by-election held in late 1974. He did not seek a return to the legislature after this time.
