= Noé Chevrier =

Canadian politician

The Honourable Noé E. (Noah) Chevrier

Canadian Senator from Manitoba
- In office January 18, 1909 – October 9, 1911
- Appointed by: Wilfrid Laurier

Personal details
- Born: April 27, 1846 Rigaud, Canada East
- Died: October 9, 1911 (aged 65) Ottawa, Ontario, Canada
- Party: Liberal

Noé E. (Noah) Chevrier (April 27, 1846 – October 9, 1911) was a clothier, furrier and political figure in Manitoba, Canada. He sat for Winnipeg division in the Senate of Canada from 1909 to 1911.

== Early life and career ==
He was born in Rigaud, Canada East, the son of Alexandre Gauthier and Mathilde Chevrier, and was educated there. He worked in his father's clothing business in Ottawa and then, in 1881, went to Winnipeg where he established a business, Le Magasin Bleu (also known as The Blue Store), in partnership with A. Chevrier. Chevrier was married twice: to Isabella Johnston in 1880 and later to Agnes McMillan after his first wife's death in 1884. His son Horace served in the Manitoba assembly.

== Death ==
He died in office in Ottawa at the age of 65.
