= John Patrick Molloy =

Canadian politician

The Honourable John Patrick Molloy

Member of Parliament for Provencher
- In office 1908–1921
- Preceded by: Joseph Ernest Cyr
- Succeeded by: Arthur-Lucien Beaubien

Canadian Senator from Manitoba
- In office 1925–1948
- Appointed by: William Lyon Mackenzie King

Personal details
- Born: March 13, 1873 Arthur, Ontario, Canada
- Died: March 16, 1948 (aged 75)
- Party: Liberal

John Patrick Molloy (March 13, 1873 – March 16, 1948) was a Canadian veterinarian and politician. He was a member of Parliament (MP) for the riding of Provencher in the House of Commons of Canada from 1908 until 1921. Molloy was later appointed to the Senate of Canada, representing Manitoba from 1925 until 1948.

== Early life and education ==
Born in Arthur, Ontario of Irish Canadian parentage, Molloy was educated in the public and secondary schools of Ontario. He later attended the Ontario Veterinary College where he graduated in 1902. He spent the following year doing post graduate studies at the McKillip Veterinary College in Chicago where he received a M.D.V. degree. He returned to Canada settling in Morris, Manitoba where he established a practice.

== Political career ==
He ran as a candidate for the Legislative Assembly of Manitoba in the 1907 election but was defeated. He was elected to the House of Commons of Canada for the electoral district of Provencher in the 1908 federal election. A Liberal, he was re-elected in 1911 and 1917. He was defeated in 1921 and was summoned to the Senate of Canada on the advice of William Lyon Mackenzie King in 1925 representing the senatorial division of Provencher, Manitoba. He served until his death in 1948.

== Electoral history ==
1917 Canadian federal election: Provencher
Party	Candidate	Votes	%	±%
Opposition (Laurier Liberals)	John Patrick Molloy	2,035	52.4	-1.0
Government (Unionist)	John Robert Johns	1,850	47.6	1.0
Total valid votes		3,885	100.0	

Note: Unionist vote is compared to Conservative vote in 1911 election.

1911 Canadian federal election: Provencher
Party	Candidate	Votes	%	±%
Liberal	John Patrick Molloy	3,049	53.3	-1.3
Conservative	Joseph Alfred Féréol Bleau	2,668	46.7	+1.3
Total valid votes		5,717	100.0	

1908 Canadian federal election: Provencher
Party	Candidate	Votes	%	±%
Liberal	John Patrick Molloy	2,719	54.6	+4.5
Conservative	Alphonse-Alfred-Clément Larivière	2,259	45.4	-4.5
Total valid votes		4,978	100.0	
