= David Iftody =

Canadian politician (1956–2001)

The Honourable David Iftody
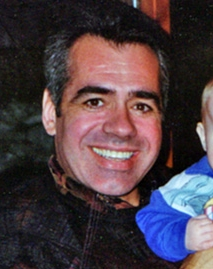

Member of Parliament for Provencher
- In office October 25, 1993 – October 22, 2000
- Preceded by: Jake Epp
- Succeeded by: Vic Toews

Personal details
- Born: June 15, 1956 Winnipeg, Manitoba, Canada
- Died: February 5, 2001 (aged 44)
- Party: Liberal
- Education: University of Manitoba

David Iftody (June 15, 1956 – February 5, 2001) was a Romanian Canadian politician. He served in the House of Commons of Canada from 1993 to 2000 as a member of the Liberal Party of Canada, representing the Manitoba riding of Provencher.

== Early life and career ==
Iftody was born in Winnipeg, Manitoba, with family roots in Lac du Bonnet, Manitoba. He worked at the Manitoba Youth Care Centre from 1977 to 1982, and subsequently received Bachelor of Social Work (1985) and Master of Public Administration (1987) degrees from the University of Manitoba. He later moved to Ottawa, Ontario, where he worked as a management consultant and was owner and president of the firm Animus Research. He also lectured at Carleton University in the Faculty of Law.

== Member of Parliament ==
Iftody returned to Manitoba to stand as the Liberal candidate for Provencher in the 1993 federal election, and was elected over Reform Party candidate Dean Whiteway. The Liberals won a majority government under Jean Chrétien, and Iftody entered parliament as a government backbencher. He was re-elected in the 1997 election against a strong challenge from the Reform Party, and served as parliamentary secretary to the Minister of Indian Affairs and Northern Development from July 1998 until 2000. He was defeated in the 2000 election, losing to Canadian Alliance candidate Vic Toews.

=== Issues ===
Banking

Iftody was appointed to the House of Commons Finance Committee shortly after his election. In this capacity, he called for the creation of a federal ombudsman with the authority to levy fines against major banks that cut off credit to small businesses without due cause. In 1996, he proposed an amendment to Canada's Bank Act that would prevent major Canadian banks from acquiring each other via hostile takeovers. The following year, he argued that the government acted with undue haste in approving the Bank of Nova Scotia's takeover of National Trust. He served on a Liberal caucus task force on financial institutions in 1998, and supported its conclusion that two proposed major bank mergers would be against the interests of Canadians.

Social issues and firearms registry

Iftody was a committed Roman Catholic, and was part of the socially conservative wing of the Liberal Party. In late 1994, he opposed his government's plans to add sexual orientation as a protected category under Canada's hate crimes legislation. He later opposed similar legislation protecting homosexuals under the Canadian Human Rights Act, and was one of 17 Liberal MPs to vote against legislation expanding the benefits of same-sex couples in 2000. Iftody said that he did not support discrimination and denied being part of a parliamentary "God squad", but nonetheless expressed a personal view that homosexuality was "spiritually unhealthy".

He also opposed the Chrétien government's plan to create a national firearms registry, and voted against the bill enabling the registry on its final reading. Some believed that he would be barred from sitting on a Commons standing committee for this decision, but he escaped punishment. Iftody's opposition to the gun registry was popular in his mostly rural riding.

International relations

Iftody was of Romanian background, and was chairman of the Canada-Romanian Parliamentary Group in the 1990s. In 1997, he helped convince the Romanian government to support an international treaty banning land mines. He also criticized Shell Oil for its human rights record in Nigeria, claiming that the company had violated "the elementary standards of the international code of conduct for business" by failing to intervene against government abuses. He supported increased trade between Canada and the Republic of China (Taiwan).

Nuclear energy

Iftody supported nuclear energy, and actively campaigned to prevent the Atomic Energy of Canada Ltd. research station in Pinawa from closing.

=== Other ===
In late 1997, Iftody intervened to rescue a woman from a potential sexual assault in an Ottawa boarding house. Hearing a struggle in a room near his own, he discovered an intruder holding the female owner of the establishment against a wall. He stopped the attack, and detained the attacker until the police arrived.

== Death ==
Iftody died unexpectedly on February 5, 2001, after suffering internal bleeding in his liver following a snowmobile accident. The House of Commons paid tribute to him the following day. In 2003, Providence College and Theological Seminary in Otterburne began an annual series called the David Iftody Memorial Lectures.

== Electoral record ==
2000 Canadian federal election: Provencher
Party	Candidate	Votes	%	±%	Expenditures
Alliance	Vic Toews	21,358	52.76	+17.68	$65,896.75
Liberal	David Iftody	14,419	35.62	−4.38	$60,917.43
Progressive Conservative	Henry C. Dyck	2,726	6.73	−9.59	$7,780.05
New Democratic	Peter Hiebert	1,980	4.89	−3.71	$210.45
Total valid votes		40,483	100.00		
Total rejected ballots		148	0.36	−0.10	
Turnout		40,631	70.03	+5.09	
Electors on the lists		58,020			
Sources: Official Results, Elections Canada and Financial Returns, Elections Canada.

1997 Canadian federal election: Provencher
Party	Candidate	Votes	%	±%	Expenditures
Liberal	David Iftody	14,595	40.00	−0.82	$61,072
Reform	Larry Tardiff	12,798	35.08	−2.09	$42,111
Progressive Conservative	Clare Braun	5,955	16.32	+5.43	$60,432
New Democratic	Martha Wiebe Owen	3,137	8.60	+1.62	$1,793
Total valid votes		36,485	100.00		
Total rejected ballots		170	0.46	+0.13	
Turnout		36,655	64.94	−5.61	
Electors on the lists		56,442			
Percentage change figures are factored for redistribution.
Sources: Official Results, Elections Canada and Financial Returns, Elections Canada.

1993 Canadian federal election: Provencher
Party	Candidate	Votes	%	±%	Expenditures
Liberal	David Iftody	16,119	44.04	+11.5	$42,045
Reform	Dean Whiteway	13,463	36.78	+33.1	$49,513
Progressive Conservative	Kelly Clark	3,765	10.29	−45.2	$48,359
New Democratic	Martha Wiebe Owen	1,818	4.97	−2.3	$7,277
National	Wes Penner	1,212	3.3		$23,719
Natural Law	Corrine Ayotte	157	0.43	+0.1	$12
Canada Party	Ted Bezan	69	0.19	–	$0
Total valid votes		36,603	100.00		
Total rejected ballots		126	0.34	+0.0	
Turnout		36,729	69.52	−1.4	
Electors on the lists		52,835			
Source: Thirty-fifth General Election, 1993: Official Voting Results, Published by the Chief Electoral Officer of Canada. Financial figures taken from official contributions and expenses provided by Elections Canada.

All electoral information is taken from Elections Canada.
