= Jake Epp =

Canadian executive and politician (1939–2025)

The Honourable Jake Epp PC OC

Chancellor of Tyndale University College and Seminary
- In office 2005–2009
- Preceded by: John N. Gladstone
- Succeeded by: Brian Stiller

Member of the Canadian Parliament for Provencher
- In office October 30, 1972 – October 24, 1993
- Preceded by: Mark Smerchanski
- Succeeded by: David Iftody

Personal details
- Born: Arthur Jacob Epp; September 1, 1939 Saint Boniface, Manitoba, Canada
- Died: July 5, 2025 (aged 85)
- Party: Progressive Conservative
- Profession: Business executive, teacher
- Cabinet: Minister of Energy, Mines and Resources (1989–1993); Minister of National Health and Welfare (1984–1989); Minister of Indian Affairs and Northern Development (1979–1980)

Arthur Jacob Epp PC OC (September 1, 1939 – July 5, 2025) was a Canadian politician, cabinet minister, and corporate executive. A member of Parliament (MP) from 1972 to 1993, he served in several senior roles in the governments of Joe Clark and Brian Mulroney, including as minister of Indian Affairs and Northern Development, Minister of National Health and Welfare, and minister of Energy, Mines and Resources. He later held key appointments in the energy sector and served as chancellor of Tyndale University. In 2010, he was made an Officer of the Order of Canada.

== Early life and education ==
Epp was born in St. Boniface, Winnipeg, and raised in Steinbach, Manitoba, in a Mennonite family. His father was a pastor in the Canadian Conference of Mennonite Brethren Churches.

Epp earned a Bachelor of Arts and a Bachelor of Education from the University of Manitoba in 1961.

He taught high school history at Steinbach Collegiate for over a decade, served on the Steinbach town council (1970–1971), including a term as deputy mayor. He helped establish the Emmanual Evangelical Free Church in Steinbach.

== Member of Parliament ==
Epp was first elected to the House of Commons of Canada in the 1972 federal election as the Progressive Conservative MP for Provencher, a predominantly rural riding in southeastern Manitoba. He was re-elected in five subsequent elections, often with large majorities. Known for his discipline, policy focus, and Christian convictions, Epp emerged as a leading figure in the party's western and socially conservative wing.

== Ministerial roles ==
Minister of Indian Affairs and Northern Development (1979–1980). Appointed to Cabinet by Prime Minister Joe Clark, Epp became the first Mennonite in Canadian history to serve as a federal cabinet minister. In June 1979, he issued the "Epp Letter," which instructed the commissioner of the Yukon to cede authority to the territory's elected executive council. This move significantly advanced responsible government in Yukon.

Minister of National Health and Welfare (1984–1989). Under Prime Minister Brian Mulroney, Epp chaired the Cabinet Committee on Social Development and led early federal responses to the HIV/AIDS crisis. He initiated Canada’s first national AIDS strategy in the late 1980s and expanded tobacco control regulations. His tenure was marked by efforts to promote preventive health and social policy reform, though he faced public criticism for the government's early handling of AIDS funding and access.

Minister of Energy, Mines and Resources (1989–1993). In 1989, Epp was appointed Minister of Energy, Mines and Resources. He was responsible for Canada's energy and natural resource policies during a period of increased attention to energy security, deregulation, and environmental impact. He oversaw federal initiatives on resource development and national energy planning until his departure from Cabinet in 1993.

== Post-parliamentary career ==
After leaving politics in 1993, Epp joined TransCanada Pipelines Ltd. as senior vice president, a position he held until 2000. In 2003, he was appointed by the Ontario government to chair a review panel investigating cost overruns and project delays at the Pickering Nuclear Generating Station. The resulting "Epp Report" identified management issues and provided recommendations for nuclear refurbishment. He later served as chair of the board of Ontario Power Generation (2004–2005), where he promoted stronger governance and oversight during a politically sensitive period for Ontario's energy sector.

Epp was a dedicated advocate for global health and played a vital role in Health Partners International of Canada (HPIC). Although not one of its founders, he joined the organization's board of directors in the mid-1980s, and later served as chairman of the board, a position from which he provided strategic leadership for many years. Recognizing his contributions, HPIC established the Jake Epp Mission Development Fund to support its international relief programs.

== Academic and community leadership ==
From 2005 to 2009, Epp served as chancellor of Tyndale University College and Seminary (today Tyndale University) in Toronto.

He was active in Mennonite, evangelical, and educational communities throughout his life, advocating for the integration of faith and public service.

In his hometown of Steinbach, Manitoba, he was a key supporter of local initiatives. The public library was renamed in his honour as the Jake Epp Library in recognition of his contributions to education and civic life.

== Honours and recognition ==
Epp was named an Officer of the Order of Canada in 2010 for his "contributions to public life as a politician, corporate leader, and advocate for higher education." He also received the Queen Elizabeth II Silver Jubilee Medal (1977) and Diamond Jubilee Medal (2012).

== Personal life and death ==
Epp was married to Lydia Martens for over 60 years, and together they had one daughter.

He maintained an active presence in his church and community life in Steinbach following retirement.

Epp died on July 5, 2025, at the age of 85. Tributes were paid across political and community lines, and flags in Steinbach were lowered in his honour.

== Legacy ==
Epp's career spanned major developments in Canadian health policy, northern governance, and energy infrastructure. While some of his socially conservative positions were controversial, his long service in Cabinet, his support for Indigenous self-governance, and his leadership in public and private sectors were widely recognized. He remains one of the most prominent Canadian Mennonite politicians of the 20th century.

== Electoral history ==
1988 Canadian federal election: Provencher
Party	Candidate	Votes	%	±%
Progressive Conservative	Jake Epp	19,000	55.5	−2.7
Liberal	Wes Penner	11,121	32.5	+12.4
New Democratic	Mary Sabovitch	2,490	7.3	−6.8
Reform	Lawrence Feilberg	1,246	3.6	–
Confederation of Regions	John Wiebe	357	1.0	−5.8
Total valid votes		34,214	100.0	
Total rejected ballots		106	0.3	
Turnout		34,320	70.9	
Electors on the lists		48,385		

1984 Canadian federal election: Provencher
Party	Candidate	Votes	%	±%
Progressive Conservative	Jake Epp	20,077	58.3	+13.3
New Democratic	Ron Buzahora	6,941	20.1	-8.3
Liberal	Wally Rempel	4,859	14.1	-11.2
Confederation of Regions	Ron Bowers	2,347	6.8	–
Libertarian	Donald Ives	232	0.7	–
Total valid votes		34,456	100.0	

1980 Canadian federal election: Provencher
Party	Candidate	Votes	%	±%
Progressive Conservative	Jake Epp	14,677	44.9	-6.7
New Democratic	Richard Rattai	9,281	28.4	+2.7
Liberal	Clare Cremer	8,271	25.3	+2.7
Rhinoceros	Lawrence Feilberg	433	1.3	–
Total valid votes		32,662	100.0	
lop.parl.ca

1979 Canadian federal election: Provencher
Party	Candidate	Votes	%	±%
Progressive Conservative	Jake Epp	17,030	51.7	-3.1
New Democratic	Richard C. Greenway	8,473	25.7	+5.7
Liberal	Howard Loewen	7,459	22.6	-0.1
Total valid votes		32,962	100.0	

1974 Canadian federal election: Provencher
Party	Candidate	Votes	%	±%
Progressive Conservative	Jake Epp	13,405	54.8	+9.4
Liberal	Tom Copeland	5,558	22.7	-3.4
New Democratic	Jack Feely	4,907	20.0	-5.3
Social Credit	Jake Wall	613	2.5	-0.7
Total valid votes		24,483	100.0	

1972 Canadian federal election: Provencher
Party	Candidate	Votes	%	±%
Progressive Conservative	Jake Epp	11,262	45.3	+9.4
Liberal	Mark Smerchanski	6,489	26.1	-15.5
New Democratic	Alf Chorney	6,304	25.4	+11.2
Social Credit	Jake Wall	784	3.2	-5.0
Total valid votes		24,839	100.0	
