= Laurent Desjardins =

Canadian politician (1923–2012)

Minister of Urban Affairs
- In office January 30, 1985 – April 17, 1986
- Premier: Howard Pawley
- Preceded by: Mary Beth Dolin
- Succeeded by: Gary Doer

Minister of Health (Note: "Minister of Health and Social Development" from 1974 to 1977)
- In office November 30, 1981 – September 21, 1987
- Premier: Howard Pawley
- Preceded by: Bud Sherman
- Succeeded by: Wilson Parasiuk
- In office December 23, 1974 – October 24, 1977
- Premier: Edward Schreyer
- Preceded by: Saul Miller
- Succeeded by: Bud Sherman

Minister of Tourism, Recreation and Cultural Affairs
- In office December 1, 1971 – January 28, 1974
- Premier: Edward Schreyer
- Preceded by: Peter Burtniak
- Succeeded by: Rene Toupin

Member of the Legislative Assembly of Manitoba for St. Boniface
- In office December 20, 1974 – April 26, 1988
- Preceded by: J. Paul Marion
- Succeeded by: Neil Gaudry
- In office May 14, 1959 – June 28, 1973
- Preceded by: Roger Teillet
- Succeeded by: J. Paul Marion

Personal details
- Born: Laurent Louis Desjardins; March 15, 1923 St. Boniface, Manitoba
- Died: February 7, 2012 (aged 88) Winnipeg, Manitoba
- Party: Provincial: Liberal-Progressive/Liberal (1959-1969); Independent (1969-1971); Manitoba NDP (1971-1988); Federal: Liberal

Laurent Louis "Larry" Desjardins (March 15, 1923 – February 7, 2012) was a politician in Manitoba, Canada. He served as a member of the Manitoba legislature for most of the period from 1959 to 1988, and was a cabinet minister under New Democratic Premiers Edward Schreyer and Howard Pawley.

== Early life ==
The son of Joseph A. Desjardins and Valentine Desautels, Desjardins was educated at St. Boniface College, St. Paul's College and the Cincinnati College of Embalming. Desjardins played professional football with the Winnipeg Blue Bombers. He was general manager of the St. Boniface Jr. Canadians and was a scout for the Montreal Canadiens. He was inducted into Manitoba’s sports hall of fame in 1990. He served in the Canadian navy during World War II. He worked as a funeral director, and was the President and Managing Director of Chapels, Ltd. He also joined the Knights of Columbus and the Canadian Council of Christian and Jews during the early years of his career. In 1944, he married Bernice McGuire.

Desjardins began his political career at the municipal level, serving as an alderman on the St. Boniface City Council from 1951 to 1954, and also serving on the St. Boniface Hospital Board for a number of years.

== Provincial career ==
In the Manitoba general election of 1959, he was elected to the Manitoba legislature in the riding of St. Boniface as a Liberal-Progressive. This was the year of Progressive Conservative Premier Dufferin Roblin's first majority win, and Desjardins joined ten other Liberal-Progressives in the official opposition.

In 1961, Desjardins emerged as one of the leading parliamentary supporters of government funding for private and denominational schools. A Roman Catholic and a native French-speaker, Desjardins regarded such funding as necessary for redressing anti-francophone legislation that had been pursued by previous Manitoba governments in the late nineteenth and early twentieth centuries. The Roblin government took some steps on this front, but the issue was still unresolved by the 1970s.

Despite the Roblin government's popularity, Desjardins had little difficulty being returned in the elections of 1962 and 1966 (the Liberal-Progressives had changed their name to the Manitoba Liberal Party in 1961). In the 1969 election, Desjardins faced stronger than usual competition from his New Democratic opponent, Kam Gajdosik, but won by 4210 votes to 2656.

=== Crossing the floor ===
The 1969 election was a watershed in Manitoba politics, and resulted in a dramatic shift in Desjardins' career. Under Edward Schreyer's leadership, the social-democratic NDP moved from third to first place, winning 28 seats out of 57 in the assembly. This was one short of a majority, and there was initial uncertainty as to which party or parties would form government. There was some consideration of an "anti-socialist coalition", which would have brought together all parties except the NDP under the leadership of former Liberal leader Gildas Molgat. This, however, did not occur. The impasse was ended when Desjardins announced that he would offer parliamentary support to the NDP, and change his party affiliation to Liberal-Democrat.

Desjardins' change of affiliation was significant, and on some levels surprising. He had previously been known as an opponent of socialism, and the Franco-Manitoban community had not traditionally been supportive of the New Democratic Party before this time. Nevertheless, Desjardins formed an alliance with Schreyer (himself a centrist New Democrat), on the understanding that he would be able to continue to work in favour of denominational school funding on the government side.

In order to make sure this move was supported by his constituents, Desjardins organized a vote of confidence on this decision on July 8. Had he lost this vote, Desjardins would have resigned as MLA, and would have run as a Liberal-Democrat candidate in a subsequent by-election. About 1000 people showed up at the Louis Riel School gymnasium for the vote of confidence, and Desjardins received a standing ovation when he arrived in the hall. The vast majority of the attendees gave their support to Desjardins, with only 13 people opposing him. Desjardins became Schreyer's legislative assistant in 1969, and formally joined the New Democratic Party in 1971.

On December 1, 1971, Desjardins was appointed Minister of Tourism, Recreation and Cultural Affairs. In July 1972, his efforts in support of denominational schools were dealt a setback when a government-sponsored bill to permit funding was defeated by a free vote in the legislature. (The Schreyer government did, however, make administrative agreements with certain private schools to provide them with access to public monies.)

=== Defeat and return ===
Given the lack of historical francophone support for the NDP in Manitoba, it was unclear if Desjardins would be re-elected in the provincial election of 1973, and his riding was targeted by a right-wing "citizen's" group in the recently amalgamated city of Winnipeg (which included St. Boniface). This group convinced the Progressive Conservative Party to withdraw their candidate in St. Boniface to provide a single "anti-socialist" alternative to the NDP.

Desjardins' sole opponent in June 1973 was Liberal candidate J. Paul Marion. Following a very close race, Marion was declared the winner by a single vote (4301 to 4300). This result was disputed, however, and was subsequently overturned by the Controverted Elections Act. In December 1974, Desjardins defeated Marion in a by-election by over 600 votes.

=== Later career ===
In 1973, Schreyer's New Democrats were re-elected, winning their first majority government. Desjardins had resigned from cabinet on January 28, 1974, during the ongoing controversy concerning the St. Boniface results, but that December 23, he was re-admitted to cabinet as Minister of Health and Social Development. On January 8, 1975, he was also given responsibility for the Manitoba Lotteries Act.

Desjardins was easily re-elected in the 1977 election, although Schreyer's New Democrats were defeated provincially by the Progressive Conservatives under Sterling Lyon. Desjardins sat as a member of the opposition for the next four years.

The New Democrats returned to power in the 1981 provincial election under the leadership of Howard Pawley, and Desjardins was personally re-elected without difficulty. He was re-appointed to cabinet on November 30, 1981, serving as Minister of Health and Minister of Recreation and Sport, with responsibility for the Lotteries and Gaming Control Act. He was re-designated as Minister of Health with responsibility for Minister responsible for Sport, the Fitness and Amateur Sport Act, and the Boxing and Wrestling Commission Act and the Manitoba Lotteries Foundation Act.

During the 1980s, Desjardins was a prominent supporter of Howard Pawley's efforts to expand and entrench French-language services in Manitoba.

On January 30, 1985, Desjardins was shifted to the Ministry of Urban Affairs. He was again re-elected without difficulty in the 1986 provincial election, and on April 17, 1986, he was reappointed Minister of Health and Sport (once again holding responsibility for the Boxing and Wrestling Commission Act and the Fitness and Amateur Sport Act).

Desjardins's work for the interest of sport in Manitoba was recognized with his induction into the Manitoba Sports Hall of Fame as a Multi-sport Builder in 1990.

=== Retirement ===
Desjardins resigned from his cabinet positions on February 10, 1988, after a Supreme Court ruling that provinces could not restrict a woman's right to abortion, and announced that he would be leaving the legislature to take a job in the private sector. His seat was not formally declared vacant, but he stopped attending sessions of the legislature after this period. He then served as head of the Manitoba Health Organization until 1990.

Ironically, just as Desjardins had helped bring the NDP into government in 1969, his decision to leave the legislature in 1988 played a major role in the party's unexpected fall from power. In his absence, the legislature was almost evenly divided between government and opposition members; as such, NDP backbencher Jim Walding's decision to vote against his government's budget was enough to defeat the Pawley ministry in the House. The NDP lost the subsequent 1988 Manitoba general election, and did not return to power until 1999.

During his time in the legislature, Desjardins was known as a personable figure; fellow New Democratic cabinet minister Russell Doern once called him a "Rabelasian character". He was regarded as cautious and pragmatic, and was often more supportive of small-business interests than others in the New Democratic Party. Desjardins was a member of the federal Liberal Party for most, if not all of time in the provincial NDP. This practice is no longer possible; the federal NDP is now integrated with its provincial and territorial branches. He openly supported former Liberal MLA Lloyd Axworthy's successful bid to enter the House of Commons of Canada in 1979.

During the 1990s, Desjardins led a policy review group which studied Manitoba's lotteries system, and argued against the expansion of Manitoba's casino economy. In 2002, he wrote an open letter on health-care reform, arguing that money alone would not resolve the problems within the system. In March 2003, he participated in a discussion on health-care funding at the Frontier Centre for Public Policy, in which he argued that Canada's provinces should be permitted to enact user fees and expand the role of the private sector in health-care provision. He served as first president of the Western Canada Lottery Foundation.

Desjardins died at the Victoria Hospital in Winnipeg following a fall; he was 88 years old.
