= Mark Smerchanski =

Canadian politician (1914–1989)

Mark G. Smerchanski

Member of the Canadian Parliament for Provencher
- In office June 25, 1968 – October 30, 1972
- Preceded by: Warner Jorgenson
- Succeeded by: Jake Epp

Member of the Legislative Assembly of Manitoba for Burrows
- In office December 14, 1962 – June 23, 1966
- Preceded by: John Hawryluk
- Succeeded by: Ben Hanuschak

Personal details
- Born: November 1, 1914 Malonton, Manitoba, Canada
- Died: September 21, 1989 (aged 74)
- Party: Liberal
- Other political affiliations: Manitoba Liberal Party
- Education: University of Manitoba; Virginia Polytechnical Institute

Mark G. Smerchanski (November 1, 1914 – September 21, 1989) was a Canadian politician. He was a member of the Legislative Assembly of Manitoba from 1962 to 1966, and a member of the House of Commons of Canada from 1968 to 1972. Smerchanski was a member of the Liberal Party of Canada and the Manitoba Liberal Party.

== Early life and career ==
Born in Malonton, Manitoba, the son of Anton Smerchanski and Dora Huley, both of Ukrainian descent, Smerchanski was educated at the University of Manitoba and the Virginia Polytechnical Institute, graduating in 1938. In 1940, Smerchanski married Patricia N. Paget. He worked as a professor of Engineering before entering politics, and was a member of the Canadian Institute for Mining and Metallurgy, the American Institute of Mining and Metallurgical Engineers, the Pan-American Institute of Mining Engineers and the Society of Economic Geologists. In 1953, he was appointed to the inaugural Board of Commissioners of the Winnipeg Transit System.

== Provincial politics ==
Smerchanski was a successful businessman, and was a leading organizer in the Manitoba Liberal Party long before he first ran for office himself. When Douglas Campbell resigned as Liberal leader in 1961, Smerchanski entered the race to succeed him and initially emerged as the frontrunner. He resigned on the weekend of the convention, however, and allowed Gildas Molgat to take his place as a candidate. Molgat won the contest on the first ballot, and it is likely that Smerchanski's last-minute withdrawal was arranged well in advance.

He first ran for the Manitoba legislature in the 1962 provincial election, and defeated NDP incumbent John Hawryluk by 289 votes in the north-end Winnipeg constituency of Burrows. He served in the parliamentary opposition for the next four years, but lost his seat by almost 1,000 votes to NDP candidate Ben Hanuschak in the 1966 election.

== Federal Politics ==
He was elected to the Canadian House of Commons in the "Trudeaumania" election of 1968, defeating Progressive Conservative incumbent Warner Jorgenson by 1,230 votes in the rural, southeastern riding of Provencher. He served as a backbench supporter of Pierre Trudeau's government for four years, and lost to PC candidate Jake Epp in the federal election of 1972.

== Return to provincial politics ==
He sought a return to the Manitoba legislature in the 1973 election, running in the rural constituency of Emerson. He did not win, but took enough votes away from the Progressive Conservative candidate to give the NDP a victory in the riding for the first and (to date) only time. He did not run again after this.

== Death ==
Smerchanski died in Winnipeg at the age of 74.

== Legacy ==
There is currently a Mark Smerchanski Memorial Prize in Women's Studies offered by the University of Manitoba, and the Mark G. Smerchanski Prize in geology/geophysics.

== Electoral history ==
1972 Canadian federal election: Provencher
Party	Candidate	Votes	%	±%
Progressive Conservative	Jake Epp	11,262	45.3	+9.4
Liberal	Mark Smerchanski	6,489	26.1	-15.5
New Democratic	Alf Chorney	6,304	25.4	+11.2
Social Credit	Jake Wall	784	3.2	-5.0
Total valid votes		24,839	100.0	

1968 Canadian federal election: Provencher
Party	Candidate	Votes	%	±%
Liberal	Mark Smerchanski	9,021	41.6	+2.7
Progressive Conservative	Warner Jorgenson	7,791	36.0	-12.1
New Democratic	Harry Blake-Knox	3,078	14.2	+10.2
Social Credit	Lorne Reznowski	1,773	8.2	-0.7
Total valid votes		21,663	100.0	
