= Joseph Dumas =

Canadian politician (1875–1950)

- Born: February 19, 1875; Neche, North Dakota
- Died: January 14, 1950 (aged 74); Saugus, California
- Occupation: politician
- Years active: 1915–1920
- Political party: Liberal Party
- Spouse: Mary Nisbett (m. 1898)

Joseph Pierre Dumas (February 19, 1875 – January 14, 1950) was a politician in Manitoba, Canada. He served in the Legislative Assembly of Manitoba from 1915 to 1920 as a member of the Liberal Party.

Born in Neche, North Dakota, Dumas came to Manitoba in 1897. He worked as a construction contractor. In 1898, he married Mary Nisbett.

Dumas was elected to the Manitoba legislature in the 1915 provincial election, defeating a Conservative and an independent Liberal candidate in the constituency of St. Boniface. The Liberal Party won this election, and Dumas served as a backbench supporter of Tobias Norris's administration for the next five years.

He ran for re-election in the 1920 campaign, but finished third against Conservative-Independent candidate Joseph Bernier.

In 1935, Dumas moved to California. He died in Saugus, California.
