= Arthur-Lucien Beaubien =

Canadian politician (1879–1971)

The Honourable Arthur-Lucien Beaubien

Canadian Senator from Manitoba
- In office January 29, 1940 – February 1, 1969
- Appointed by: William Lyon Mackenzie King

Member of Parliament for Provencher
- In office 1921–1940
- Preceded by: John Patrick Molloy
- Succeeded by: René Jutras

Personal details
- Born: February 11, 1879 Arthabaska, Quebec, Canada
- Died: March 21, 1971 (aged 92)
- Party: Progressive Party; Liberal-Progressive; Liberal Party
- Occupation: Politician; farmer

Arthur-Lucien Beaubien (February 11, 1879 – March 21, 1971) was a Canadian politician and farmer.

== Background ==
Born in Arthabaska, Quebec, he was elected to the House of Commons of Canada in the 1921 election as a member of the Progressive Party to represent the riding or electoral district of Provencher. He was re-elected in 1925, and in 1926 (by acclamation) and 1930 as a Liberal Progressive. He was then re-elected in 1935 as he switched to the Liberal Party.

In 1940, he was appointed to the Senate of Canada upon the advice of Mackenzie King to the senate division of Provencher, Manitoba. He was made Government Whip in the Senate in 1951 until 1957. He became the Senate Opposition Whip in 1958 until 1962 then served another term as Senate Government Whip from 1964 to 1969.

Beaubien also served on various standing committees. He was chair of the Special Committee on the Canadian Radio Broadcasting Commission during the 18th Parliament. He sat on the Standing Joint Committee on the Parliamentary Restaurant, during the 18th Parliament as well as numerous Senate committees. Prior to his federal political experience, he was reeve of Montcalm, Manitoba in 1921.

== Electoral history ==
1935 Canadian federal election: Provencher
Party	Candidate	Votes	%	±%
Liberal	Arthur-Lucien Beaubien	6,308	62.7	+4.8
Conservative	Philippe Bourgeois	3,751	37.3	+8.4
Total valid votes		10,059	100.0	

1930 Canadian federal election: Provencher
Party	Candidate	Votes	%
Liberal–Progressive	Arthur-Lucien Beaubien	4,562	58.0
Conservative	Joseph-Arthur Belanger	2,274	28.9
Independent Conservative	Wasyl Kobzar	715	9.1
Liberal	Alexandre Ayotte	321	4.1
Total valid votes		7,872	100.0

1926 Canadian federal election: Provencher
Party	Candidate	Votes
Liberal–Progressive	Arthur-Lucien Beaubien	acclaimed

1925 Canadian federal election: Provencher
Party	Candidate	Votes	%
Progressive	Arthur-Lucien Beaubien	2,736	50.7
Liberal	Edmond Comeault	2,656	49.3
Total valid votes		5,392	100.0

1921 Canadian federal election: Provencher
Party	Candidate	Votes	%
Progressive	Arthur-Lucien Beaubien	3,189	47.0
Liberal	John Patrick Molloy	2,177	32.0
Independent	Albert Prefontaine	1,428	21.0
Total valid votes		6,794	100.0
