= John Power Howden =

Canadian politician

The Honourable John Power Howden

Member of Parliament for St. Boniface
- In office October 29, 1925 – April 17, 1945
- Succeeded by: Fernand Viau

Canadian Senator from Manitoba
- In office April 18, 1945 – November 4, 1959
- Appointed by: William Lyon Mackenzie King

Personal details
- Born: December 5, 1879 Perth, Ontario, Canada
- Died: November 4, 1959 (aged 79)
- Party: Liberal

John Power Howden (December 5, 1879 – November 4, 1959) was a Canadian politician and physician.

== Early life ==
Howden was born in Perth, Ontario. When he was 12, his family moved to Manitoba where he attended public school in Winnipeg and earned his medical degree at the University of Manitoba before establishing his practice in St. Boniface, Manitoba.

== Political career ==
He became active in community life and was elected mayor of St. Boniface serving in the position from 1916 to 1917.

A Liberal, he was first elected to the House of Commons of Canada in the 1925 federal election as the Member of Parliament for St. Boniface and was re-elected in four subsequent elections and served in the House of Commons for two decades, until April 1945 when he was appointed to the Senate of Canada by William Lyon Mackenzie King.

== Death ==
Howden served in the upper house until his death in 1959 several months after suffering from a stroke.

== Electoral history ==
1940 Canadian federal election: Saint Boniface—Saint Vital
Party	Candidate	Votes	%	±%
Liberal	John Power Howden	7,926	51.8	-5.0
National Government	George Campbell MacLean	3,578	23.4	+6.2
Social Credit	Philippe Guay	1,839	12.0	+7.2
Co-operative Commonwealth	George Henry Barefoot	1,739	11.4	-6.4
Independent	Morris Jacob	216	1.4	
Total valid votes		15,298	100.0	

1935 Canadian federal election: Saint Boniface—Saint Vital
Party	Candidate	Votes	%	±%
Liberal	John Power Howden	7,353	56.8	+5.1
Co-operative Commonwealth	Edwin Arnold Hansford	2,304	17.8	+3.5
Conservative	Joseph-Placide Bertrand	2,222	17.2	-16.8
Social Credit	Victor James Gray	624	4.8	
Reconstruction	Thomas Boniface Molloy	438	3.4	
Total valid votes		12,941	100.0	

1930 Canadian federal election: Saint Boniface—Saint Vital
Party	Candidate	Votes	%	±%
Liberal	John Power Howden	7,045	51.7	+0.7
Conservative	Edgar Honwell Cook	4,630	34.0	+6.0
Labour	Edwin Arnold Hansford	1,943	14.3	-6.7
Total valid votes		13,618	100.0	

1926 Canadian federal election: Saint Boniface—Saint Vital
Party	Candidate	Votes	%	±%
Liberal	John Power Howden	5,903	51.0	+3.6
Conservative	Joseph Bernier	3,235	28.0	+3.9
Labour	Allan Meikle	2,427	21.0	-7.6
Total valid votes		11,565	100.0	

1925 Canadian federal election: Saint Boniface—Saint Vital
Party	Candidate	Votes	%
Liberal	John Power Howden	4,819	47.4
Independent Labour	Allan Meikle	2,901	28.5
Conservative	George Campbell MacLean	2,442	24.0
Total valid votes		10,162	100.0
