= S. A. D. Bertrand =

Canadian politician

Simon-Amable-Damien Bertrand (1849 – December 25, 1943) was a businessman and political figure in Manitoba. He represented St. Boniface in 1900 in the Legislative Assembly of Manitoba as a Liberal.

He was born in Chambly, Canada East, and came to Winnipeg in 1878 as a representative for a dry goods firm. From 1892 to 1901, he was a director for The Great-West Life Assurance Company. After being elected in 1899, Bertrand resigned his seat in the Manitoba assembly on September 6, 1900 to run unsuccessfully as a Liberal candidate in the federal riding of Provencher.

In 1901, he was named superintendent of public works for the Yukon.

He died in Montreal and was buried in the Notre Dame des Neiges Cemetery.
