= René Jutras =

Canadian politician

Member of the Canadian Parliament for Provencher
- In office 1940–1957
- Preceded by: Arthur-Lucien Beaubien
- Succeeded by: Warner Jorgenson

Personal details
- Born: September 30, 1913 Letellier, Manitoba
- Died: December 23, 1995 (aged 82) Ottawa, Ontario
- Party: Liberal
- Education: University of Manitoba

René Jutras (September 30, 1913 – December 23, 1995) was a Canadian politician.

Born in Letellier, Manitoba, the of son Joseph Jutras and Clara Blais, he attended St. Boniface College and received a Bachelor of Arts degree from the University of Manitoba. During World War II he was in the Royal Canadian Air Force. He was first elected to the House of Commons of Canada for the riding of Provencher in the 1940 federal election. A Liberal, he lost his seat in the 1957 election.

== Electoral history ==
1957 Canadian federal election: Provencher
Party	Candidate	Votes	%	±%
Progressive Conservative	Warner Jorgenson	4,739	35.2	+13.8
Liberal	René Jutras	4,489	33.3	-32.6
Social Credit	Hugh M. Campbell	3,992	29.6	+17.0
Co-operative Commonwealth	Charles Biesick	246	1.8	–
Total valid votes		13,466	100.0	

1953 Canadian federal election: Provencher
Party	Candidate	Votes	%	±%
Liberal	René Jutras	6,632	66.0	+2.9
Progressive Conservative	Abram J. Thiessen	2,151	21.4	–
Social Credit	Wilbert Tinkler	1,269	12.6	–
Total valid votes		10,052	100.0	

1949 Canadian federal election: Provencher
Party	Candidate	Votes	%	±%
Liberal	René Jutras	6,834	63.0	+23.3
Independent	Bruce MacKenzie	4,008	37.0	–
Total valid votes		10,842	100.0	

1945 Canadian federal election: Provencher
Party	Candidate	Votes	%	±%
Liberal	René Jutras	4,541	39.7	+8.9
Independent	Leo Arthur Slater	2,220	19.4	-7.8
Social Credit	Paul Prince	1,940	17.0	+10.1
Co-operative Commonwealth	Alexander Duncan Miller	1,838	16.1	+9.2
Progressive Conservative	Dalton Madill Boyd	894	7.8	-4.0
Total valid votes		11,433	100.0	

Note: Progressive Conservative vote is compared to "National Government" vote in 1940 election. Social Credit vote is compared to New Democracy vote in 1940 election.

1940 Canadian federal election: Provencher
Party	Candidate	Votes	%	±%
Liberal	René Jutras	3,768	30.8	-31.9
Independent	Leo A. Slater	3,329	27.2	–
Independent	Harry Matthew Podolsky	1,765	14.4	–
National Government	William Richard Johnston	1,441	11.8	-25.5
New Democracy	Albert Banville	1,099	9.0	–
Co-operative Commonwealth	Évariste Rupert Gagnon	841	6.9	–
Total valid votes		12,243	100.0	

Note: "National Government" vote is compared to Conservative vote in 1935 election.
