= Provencher =

Federal electoral district in Manitoba, Canada

Coordinates: 49.696°N 95.910°W

Manitoba electoral district
- Interactive map of riding boundaries from the 2025 federal election

Federal electoral district
- Legislature: House of Commons
MP
Ted Falk
Conservative
- District created: 1871
- First contested: 1871
- Last contested: 2025
- District webpage: profile, map

Demographics
- Population (2011): 88,640
- Electors (2015): 63,356
- Area (km²): 18,773
- Pop. density (per km²): 4.7
- Census division(s): Division No. 1, Division No. 2, Division No. 3, Division No. 12, Division No. 19
- Census subdivision(s): Steinbach, Hanover, Springfield (part), Taché, Ritchot, La Broquerie, Niverville, Ste. Anne, De Salaberry, Ste. Anne

Provencher is a federal electoral district in Manitoba, Canada, that has been represented in the House of Commons of Canada since 1871. It is a largely rural constituency in the province's southeast corner. Its largest community is the city of Steinbach, which makes up 15% of the riding's total population.

== Geography ==
The district is in the most southeastern part of Manitoba.

== Demographics ==
Panethnic groups in Provencher (2011−2021)
Panethnic group	2021		2016		2011	
Panethnic group	Pop.	%	Pop.	%	Pop.	%
European (Note: Statistic includes all persons that did not make up part of a visible minority or an indigenous identity.)	85,500	79.74%	81,390	83.15%	74,400	86.03%
Indigenous	15,825	14.76%	12,560	12.83%	10,140	11.73%
Southeast Asian (Note: Statistic includes total responses of "Filipino" and "Southeast Asian" under visible minority section on census.)	2,415	2.25%	1,775	1.81%	845	0.98%
African	1,185	1.11%	830	0.85%	430	0.5%
South Asian	935	0.87%	410	0.42%	195	0.23%
Latin American	485	0.45%	240	0.25%	175	0.2%
East Asian (Note: Statistic includes total responses of "Chinese", "Korean", and "Japanese" under visible minority section on census.)	345	0.32%	345	0.35%	170	0.2%
Middle Eastern (Note: Statistic includes total responses of "West Asian" and "Arab" under visible minority section on census.)	170	0.16%	115	0.12%	0	0%
Other/multiracial (Note: Statistic includes total responses of "Visible minority, n.i.e." and "Multiple visible minorities" under visible minority section on census.)	365	0.34%	225	0.23%	120	0.14%
Total responses	107,220	97.97%	97,880	97.93%	86,480	97.56%
Total population	109,445	100%	99,946	100%	88,640	100%
Notes: Totals greater than 100% due to multiple origin responses. Demographics based on 2012 Canadian federal electoral redistribution riding boundaries.

According to the 2011 Canadian census

Languages: 67.7% English, 17.3% German, 10.5% French, 1.2% Russian, 1.1% Ukrainian
Religions: 79.6% Christian (35.8% "Other Christian", 23.6% Catholic, 6.3% United Church, 4.8% Lutheran, 2.5% Anglican, 2.2% Baptist), 19.5% None.
Median income: $29,184 (2010)
Average income: $36,186 (2010)

== History ==
The electoral district was created in 1871, and was one of the four original ridings allocated to Manitoba when it joined the Canadian Confederation in 1870. It is notable for being the riding that elected Louis Riel to the House of Commons as an independent.

Through its history the riding has alternated between representation by the Liberals and Progressive Conservatives (or Conservative Party of Canada).

This riding lost territory to Selkirk—Interlake—Eastman and Portage—Lisgar, and gained territory from Selkirk—Interlake during the 2012 electoral redistribution.

== Members of Parliament ==
This riding has elected the following members of Parliament:

Parliament	Years	Member	Party
Provencher
1st	1871–1872	Pierre Delorme	Conservative
2nd	1872–1873	George-Étienne Cartier	Liberal–Conservative
2nd	1873–1874	Louis Riel	Independent
3rd	1874–1875	Louis Riel	Independent
3rd	1875–1878	Andrew Bannatyne	Liberal
4th	1878–1879	Joseph Dubuc	Conservative
4th	1879–1882	Joseph Royal	Conservative
5th	1882–1887	Joseph Royal	Conservative
6th	1887–1889	Joseph Royal	Conservative
6th	1889–1891	Alphonse Alfred Clément Larivière	Conservative
7th	1891–1896	Alphonse Alfred Clément Larivière	Conservative
8th	1896–1900	Alphonse Alfred Clément Larivière	Conservative
9th	1900–1904	Alphonse Alfred Clément Larivière	Conservative
10th	1904–1908	Joseph Ernest Cyr	Liberal
11th	1908–1911	John Patrick Molloy	Liberal
12th	1911–1917	John Patrick Molloy	Liberal
13th	1917–1921	John Patrick Molloy	Liberal
14th	1921–1925	Arthur-Lucien Beaubien	Progressive
15th	1925–1926	Arthur-Lucien Beaubien	Progressive
16th	1926–1930	Arthur-Lucien Beaubien	Liberal–Progressive
17th	1930–1935	Arthur-Lucien Beaubien	Liberal–Progressive
18th	1935–1940	Arthur-Lucien Beaubien	Liberal
19th	1940–1945	René Jutras	Liberal
20th	1945–1949	René Jutras	Liberal
21st	1949–1953	René Jutras	Liberal
22nd	1953–1957	René Jutras	Liberal
23rd	1957–1958	Warner Jorgenson	Progressive Conservative
24th	1958–1962	Warner Jorgenson	Progressive Conservative
25th	1962–1963	Warner Jorgenson	Progressive Conservative
26th	1963–1965	Warner Jorgenson	Progressive Conservative
27th	1965–1968	Warner Jorgenson	Progressive Conservative
28th	1968–1972	Mark Smerchanski	Liberal
29th	1972–1974	Jake Epp	Progressive Conservative
30th	1974–1979	Jake Epp	Progressive Conservative
31st	1979–1980	Jake Epp	Progressive Conservative
32nd	1980–1984	Jake Epp	Progressive Conservative
33rd	1984–1988	Jake Epp	Progressive Conservative
34th	1988–1993	Jake Epp	Progressive Conservative
35th	1993–1997	David Iftody	Liberal
36th	1997–2000	David Iftody	Liberal
37th	2000–2003	Vic Toews	Alliance
37th	2003–2004	Vic Toews	Conservative
38th	2004–2006	Vic Toews	Conservative
39th	2006–2008	Vic Toews	Conservative
40th	2008–2011	Vic Toews	Conservative
41st	2011–2013	Vic Toews	Conservative
41st	2013–2015	Ted Falk	Conservative
42nd	2015–2019	Ted Falk	Conservative
45th	2019–2021	Ted Falk	Conservative
44th	2021–2025	Ted Falk	Conservative
45th	2025–present	Ted Falk	Conservative

== Election results ==
Graph of election results in Provencher (since 1945, minor parties that never got 2% of the vote or didn't run consistently are omitted) View source data.

2025 Canadian federal election
Party	Candidate	Votes	%	±%	Expenditures
Conservative	Ted Falk	34,364	66.34	+18.00	
Liberal	Trevor Kirczenow	13,394	25.86	+9.36	
New Democratic	Brandy Schmidt	2,398	4.63	–7.58	
People's	Noël Gautron	942	1.82	–15.67	
Green	Blair Mahaffy	705	1.36	–1.20	
Total valid votes/expense limit		51,803	99.27		
Total rejected ballots		383	0.73		
Turnout		52,186	71.73		
Eligible voters		72,752			
Conservative notional hold		Swing		+4.32	
Source: Elections Canada

2021 federal election redistributed results
Party	Vote	%
Conservative	21,713	48.34
People's	7,856	17.49
Liberal	7,413	16.50
New Democratic	5,487	12.21
Green	1,150	2.56
Others	1,302	2.90

2021 Canadian federal election
Party	Candidate	Votes	%	±%	Expenditures
Conservative	Ted Falk	24,294	48.7	-17.2	$83,776.96
Liberal	Trevor Kirczenow	8,472	17.0	+3.9	$25,158.99
People's	Nöel Gautron	8,168	16.4	+14.2	$24,179.71
New Democratic	Serina Pottinger	6,270	12.6	-0.2	$0.00
Independent	Rick Loewen	1,366	2.7	N/A	$0.00
Green	Janine G. Gibson	1,272	2.6	-3.4	$1,596.00
Total valid votes/expense limit		49,901	99.5	–	$117,118.32
Total rejected ballots		355	0.5		
Turnout		50,156	67.4		
Eligible voters		74,468			
Conservative hold		Swing		-10.6	
Source: Elections Canada

2019 Canadian federal election
Party	Candidate	Votes	%	±%	Expenditures
Conservative	Ted Falk	31,821	65.9	+9.84	$91,792.89
Liberal	Trevor Kirczenow	6,347	13.1	-21.56	$13,417.34
New Democratic	Erin McGee	6,187	12.8	+7.50	none listed
Green	Janine G. Gibson	2,884	6.0	+2.02	none listed
People's	Wayne Sturby	1,066	2.2		none listed
Total valid votes/expense limit		48,305	100.0		
Total rejected ballots		322			
Turnout		48,627	70.5		
Eligible voters		68,979			
Conservative hold		Swing		+7.85	
Source: Elections Canada

2015 Canadian federal election
Party	Candidate	Votes	%	±%	Expenditures
Conservative	Ted Falk	25,086	56.06	-14.30	$116,699.56
Liberal	Terry Hayward	15,509	34.66	+27.93	$28,135.06
New Democratic	Les Lilley	2,371	5.30	-12.87	$4,287.04
Green	Jeff Wheeldon	1,779	3.98	+1.01	$6,485.90
Total valid votes/expense limit		44,745	100.00		$216,321.86
Total rejected ballots		169	0.38		
Turnout		44,914	69.53		
Eligible voters		64,598			
Conservative hold		Swing		-21.11	
Source: Elections Canada

Canadian federal by-election, November 25, 2013 Resignation of Vic Toews
Party	Candidate	Votes	%	±%	Expenditures
Conservative	Ted Falk	13,046	58.20	−12.40	$ 83,542.19
Liberal	Terry Hayward	6,711	29.94	+23.23	66,455.27
New Democratic	Natalie Courcelles Beaudry	1,843	8.22	−9.67	17,878.16
Green	Janine Gibson	817	3.64	+0.69	1,074.97
Total valid votes/expense limit		22,417	100.0	–	$ 97,453.98
Total rejected ballots		136	0.60	+0.17	
Turnout		22,553	33.85	−27.88	
Eligible voters		66,624			
Conservative hold		Swing		−17.86	
By-election due to the resignation of Vic Toews.
Source(s) "November 25, 2013 By-elections". Elections Canada. November 26, 2013. "November 25, 2013 By-election – Financial Reports".

Minister of Public Safety Vic Toews resigned from cabinet and as an MP, effective 9 July 2013, to spend more time with his family and join the private sector.

2011 federal election redistributed results
Party	Vote	%
Conservative	24,628	70.36
New Democratic	6,358	18.16
Liberal	2,355	6.73
Green	1,039	2.97
Others	623	1.78

2011 Canadian federal election
Party	Candidate	Votes	%	±%	Expenditures
Conservative	Vic Toews	27,820	70.60	+5.95	$70,719.84
New Democratic	Al Mackling	7,051	17.89	+4.17	$14,274.04
Liberal	Terry Hayward	2,645	6.71	-5.86	$25,938.56
Green	Janine Gibson	1,164	2.95	-2.84	$210.00
Christian Heritage	David Reimer	510	1.29	-1.95	$8,372.94
Pirate	Ric Lim	215	0.55	–	$393.24
Total valid votes/expense limit		39,405	100.0	–	$ 90,198.71
Total rejected ballots		169	0.43	-0.00	
Turnout		39,574	61.73	+5.63	
Eligible voters		64,104			
Conservative hold		Swing		+0.89	

2008 Canadian federal election
Party	Candidate	Votes	%	±%	Expenditures
Conservative	Vic Toews	23,303	64.65	-1.03	$67,419
New Democratic	Ross Martin	4,947	13.72	+0.01	$6,406
Liberal	Shirley Hiebert	4,531	12.57	-3.27	$16,369
Green	Janine Gibson	2,089	5.79	+1.02	$1,093
Christian Heritage	David Reimer	1,170	3.24	–	$10,130
Total valid votes/expense limit		36,040	100.0	–	$87,213
Total rejected ballots		156	0.43	+0.02	
Turnout		36,196	58.01	-7.04	

2006 Canadian federal election
Party	Candidate	Votes	%	±%	Expenditures
Conservative	Vic Toews	25,199	65.68	+2.66	$40,862.19
Liberal	Wes Penner	6,077	15.84	−9.08	$75,239.46
New Democratic	Patrick O'Connor	5,259	13.71	+4.70	$2,266.71
Green	Janine Gibson	1,830	4.77	+1.72	$87.31
Total valid votes		38,365	100.00		
Total rejected ballots		157	0.41	−0.02	
Turnout		38,522	65.05	+5.38	
Electors on the lists		59,216			
Sources: Official Results, Elections Canada and Financial Returns, Elections Canada.

2004 Canadian federal election
Party	Candidate	Votes	%	±%	Expenditures
Conservative	Vic Toews	22,694	63.02	+4.99	$70,851.00
Liberal	Peter Epp	8,975	24.92	−10.94	$64,895.23
New Democratic	Sarah Zaharia	3,244	9.01	+2.90	$1,472.79
Green	Janine Gibson	1,100	3.05	–	$480.59
Total valid votes		36,013	100.00		
Total rejected ballots		155	0.43	+0.07	
Turnout		36,168	59.67	−10.36	
Electors on the lists		60,617			
Percentage change figures are factored for redistribution. Conservative Party percentages are contrasted with the combined Canadian Alliance and Progressive Conservative percentages from 2000.
Sources: Official Results, Elections Canada and Financial Returns, Elections Canada.

Note: Conservative vote is compared to the total of the Canadian Alliance vote and Progressive Conservative vote in 2000 election.

2000 Canadian federal election
Party	Candidate	Votes	%	±%	Expenditures
Alliance	Vic Toews	21,358	52.76	+17.68	$65,896.75
Liberal	David Iftody	14,419	35.62	−4.38	$60,917.43
Progressive Conservative	Henry C. Dyck	2,726	6.73	−9.59	$7,780.05
New Democratic	Peter Hiebert	1,980	4.89	−3.71	$210.45
Total valid votes		40,483	100.00		
Total rejected ballots		148	0.36	−0.10	
Turnout		40,631	70.03	+5.09	
Electors on the lists		58,020			
Sources: Official Results, Elections Canada and Financial Returns, Elections Canada.

Note: Canadian Alliance vote is compared to the Reform vote in 1997 election.

1997 Canadian federal election
Party	Candidate	Votes	%	±%	Expenditures
Liberal	David Iftody	14,595	40.00	−0.82	$61,072
Reform	Larry Tardiff	12,798	35.08	−2.09	$42,111
Progressive Conservative	Clare Braun	5,955	16.32	+5.43	$60,432
New Democratic	Martha Wiebe Owen	3,137	8.60	+1.62	$1,793
Total valid votes		36,485	100.00		
Total rejected ballots		170	0.46	+0.13	
Turnout		36,655	64.94	−5.61	
Electors on the lists		56,442			
Percentage change figures are factored for redistribution.
Sources: Official Results, Elections Canada and Financial Returns, Elections Canada.

1993 Canadian federal election
Party	Candidate	Votes	%	±%	Expenditures
Liberal	David Iftody	16,119	44.04	+11.5	$42,045
Reform	Dean Whiteway	13,463	36.78	+33.1	$49,513
Progressive Conservative	Kelly Clark	3,765	10.29	−45.2	$48,359
New Democratic	Martha Wiebe Owen	1,818	4.97	−2.3	$7,277
National	Wes Penner	1,212	3.3		$23,719
Natural Law	Corrine Ayotte	157	0.43	+0.1	$12
Canada Party	Ted Bezan	69	0.19	–	$0
Total valid votes		36,603	100.00		
Total rejected ballots		126	0.34	+0.0	
Turnout		36,729	69.52	−1.4	
Electors on the lists		52,835			
Source: Thirty-fifth General Election, 1993: Official Voting Results, Published by the Chief Electoral Officer of Canada. Financial figures taken from official contributions and expenses provided by Elections Canada.

1988 Canadian federal election
Party	Candidate	Votes	%	±%
Progressive Conservative	Jake Epp	19,000	55.5	−2.7
Liberal	Wes Penner	11,121	32.5	+12.4
New Democratic	Mary Sabovitch	2,490	7.3	−6.8
Reform	Lawrence Feilberg	1,246	3.6	–
Confederation of Regions	John Wiebe	357	1.0	−5.8
Total valid votes		34,214	100.0	
Total rejected ballots		106	0.3	
Turnout		34,320	70.9	
Electors on the lists		48,385		

1984 Canadian federal election
Party	Candidate	Votes	%	±%
Progressive Conservative	Jake Epp	20,077	58.3	+13.3
New Democratic	Ron Buzahora	6,941	20.1	-8.3
Liberal	Wally Rempel	4,859	14.1	-11.2
Confederation of Regions	Ron Bowers	2,347	6.8	–
Libertarian	Donald Ives	232	0.7	–
Total valid votes		34,456	100.0	

1980 Canadian federal election
Party	Candidate	Votes	%	±%
Progressive Conservative	Jake Epp	14,677	44.9	-6.7
New Democratic	Richard Rattai	9,281	28.4	+2.7
Liberal	Clare Cremer	8,271	25.3	+2.7
Rhinoceros	Lawrence Feilberg	433	1.3	–
Total valid votes		32,662	100.0	
lop.parl.ca

1979 Canadian federal election
Party	Candidate	Votes	%	±%
Progressive Conservative	Jake Epp	17,030	51.7	-3.1
New Democratic	Richard C. Greenway	8,473	25.7	+5.7
Liberal	Howard Loewen	7,459	22.6	-0.1
Total valid votes		32,962	100.0	

1974 Canadian federal election
Party	Candidate	Votes	%	±%
Progressive Conservative	Jake Epp	13,405	54.8	+9.4
Liberal	Tom Copeland	5,558	22.7	-3.4
New Democratic	Jack Feely	4,907	20.0	-5.3
Social Credit	Jake Wall	613	2.5	-0.7
Total valid votes		24,483	100.0	

1972 Canadian federal election
Party	Candidate	Votes	%	±%
Progressive Conservative	Jake Epp	11,262	45.3	+9.4
Liberal	Mark Smerchanski	6,489	26.1	-15.5
New Democratic	Alf Chorney	6,304	25.4	+11.2
Social Credit	Jake Wall	784	3.2	-5.0
Total valid votes		24,839	100.0	

1968 Canadian federal election
Party	Candidate	Votes	%	±%
Liberal	Mark Smerchanski	9,021	41.6	+2.7
Progressive Conservative	Warner Jorgenson	7,791	36.0	-12.1
New Democratic	Harry Blake-Knox	3,078	14.2	+10.2
Social Credit	Lorne Reznowski	1,773	8.2	-0.7
Total valid votes		21,663	100.0	

1965 Canadian federal election
Party	Candidate	Votes	%	±%
Progressive Conservative	Warner Jorgenson	6,470	48.1	+2.0
Liberal	Gordon Barkman	5,243	39.0	+2.3
Social Credit	Wilbert J. Tinkler	1,195	8.9	-8.3
New Democratic	Francis Clement Anderson	542	4.0	–
Total valid votes		13,450	100.0	

1963 Canadian federal election
Party	Candidate	Votes	%	±%
Progressive Conservative	Warner Jorgenson	6,729	46.1	+2.6
Liberal	Stan C. Roberts	5,351	36.7	-0.4
Social Credit	Elie J. Dorge	2,512	17.2	-0.3
Total valid votes		14,592	100.0	

1962 Canadian federal election
Party	Candidate	Votes	%	±%
Progressive Conservative	Warner Jorgenson	6,214	43.5	-11.0
Liberal	Stan C. Roberts	5,290	37.1	+2.4
Social Credit	John P. Loewen	2,504	17.5	+8.6
New Democratic	Peter Kruszelnicki	263	1.8	0.0
Total valid votes		14,271	100.0	

Note: NDP vote is compared to CCF vote in 1958 election.

1958 Canadian federal election
Party	Candidate	Votes	%	±%
Progressive Conservative	Warner Jorgenson	8,278	54.5	+19.3
Liberal	René Préfontaine	5,268	34.7	+1.3
Social Credit	Wilbert James Tinkler	1,363	9.0	-20.7
Co-operative Commonwealth	Jacob John Siemens	281	1.8	0.0
Total valid votes		15,190	100.0	

1957 Canadian federal election
Party	Candidate	Votes	%	±%
Progressive Conservative	Warner Jorgenson	4,739	35.2	+13.8
Liberal	René Jutras	4,489	33.3	-32.6
Social Credit	Hugh M. Campbell	3,992	29.6	+17.0
Co-operative Commonwealth	Charles Biesick	246	1.8	–
Total valid votes		13,466	100.0	

1953 Canadian federal election
Party	Candidate	Votes	%	±%
Liberal	René Jutras	6,632	66.0	+2.9
Progressive Conservative	Abram J. Thiessen	2,151	21.4	–
Social Credit	Wilbert Tinkler	1,269	12.6	–
Total valid votes		10,052	100.0	

1949 Canadian federal election
Party	Candidate	Votes	%	±%
Liberal	René Jutras	6,834	63.0	+23.3
Independent	Bruce MacKenzie	4,008	37.0	–
Total valid votes		10,842	100.0	

1945 Canadian federal election
Party	Candidate	Votes	%	±%
Liberal	René Jutras	4,541	39.7	+8.9
Independent	Leo Arthur Slater	2,220	19.4	-7.8
Social Credit	Paul Prince	1,940	17.0	+10.1
Co-operative Commonwealth	Alexander Duncan Miller	1,838	16.1	+9.2
Progressive Conservative	Dalton Madill Boyd	894	7.8	-4.0
Total valid votes		11,433	100.0	

Note: Progressive Conservative vote is compared to "National Government" vote in 1940 election. Social Credit vote is compared to New Democracy vote in 1940 election.

1940 Canadian federal election
Party	Candidate	Votes	%	±%
Liberal	René Jutras	3,768	30.8	-31.9
Independent	Leo A. Slater	3,329	27.2	–
Independent	Harry Matthew Podolsky	1,765	14.4	–
National Government	William Richard Johnston	1,441	11.8	-25.5
New Democracy	Albert Banville	1,099	9.0	–
Co-operative Commonwealth	Évariste Rupert Gagnon	841	6.9	–
Total valid votes		12,243	100.0	

Note: "National Government" vote is compared to Conservative vote in 1935 election.

1935 Canadian federal election
Party	Candidate	Votes	%	±%
Liberal	Arthur-Lucien Beaubien	6,308	62.7	+4.8
Conservative	Philippe Bourgeois	3,751	37.3	+8.4
Total valid votes		10,059	100.0	

1930 Canadian federal election
Party	Candidate	Votes	%
Liberal–Progressive	Arthur-Lucien Beaubien	4,562	58.0
Conservative	Joseph-Arthur Belanger	2,274	28.9
Independent Conservative	Wasyl Kobzar	715	9.1
Liberal	Alexandre Ayotte	321	4.1
Total valid votes		7,872	100.0

1926 Canadian federal election
Party	Candidate	Votes
Liberal–Progressive	Arthur-Lucien Beaubien	acclaimed

1925 Canadian federal election
Party	Candidate	Votes	%
Progressive	Arthur-Lucien Beaubien	2,736	50.7
Liberal	Edmond Comeault	2,656	49.3
Total valid votes		5,392	100.0

1921 Canadian federal election
Party	Candidate	Votes	%
Progressive	Arthur-Lucien Beaubien	3,189	47.0
Liberal	John Patrick Molloy	2,177	32.0
Independent	Albert Prefontaine	1,428	21.0
Total valid votes		6,794	100.0

1917 Canadian federal election
Party	Candidate	Votes	%	±%
Opposition (Laurier Liberals)	John Patrick Molloy	2,035	52.4	-1.0
Government (Unionist)	John Robert Johns	1,850	47.6	1.0
Total valid votes		3,885	100.0	

Note: Unionist vote is compared to Conservative vote in 1911 election.

1911 Canadian federal election
Party	Candidate	Votes	%	±%
Liberal	John Patrick Molloy	3,049	53.3	-1.3
Conservative	Joseph Alfred Féréol Bleau	2,668	46.7	+1.3
Total valid votes		5,717	100.0	

1908 Canadian federal election
Party	Candidate	Votes	%	±%
Liberal	John Patrick Molloy	2,719	54.6	+4.5
Conservative	Alphonse-Alfred-Clément Larivière	2,259	45.4	-4.5
Total valid votes		4,978	100.0	

1904 Canadian federal election
Party	Candidate	Votes	%	±%
Liberal	Joseph-Ernest Cyr	1,896	50.1	+0.9
Conservative	Alphonse-Alfred-Clément Larivière	1,886	49.9	-0.9
Total valid votes		3,782	100.0	

1900 Canadian federal election
Party	Candidate	Votes	%	±%
Conservative	Alphonse-Alfred-Clément Larivière	1,528	50.7	-13.8
Liberal	S.A.D. Bertrand	1,484	49.3	+13.8
Total valid votes		3,012	100.0	

1896 Canadian federal election
Party	Candidate	Votes	%
Conservative	Alphonse-Alfred-Clément Larivière	1,476	64.6
Liberal	George Walton	810	35.4
Total valid votes		2,286	100.0

1891 Canadian federal election
Party	Candidate	Votes
Conservative	Alphonse-Alfred-Clément Larivière	acclaimed

Canadian federal by-election, 24 January 1889
Party	Candidate	Votes	%	±%
On Mr. Royal being appointed Lieutenant-Governor of the North West Territories
Conservative	Alphonse-Alfred-Clément Larivière	797	48.3	-9.8
Unknown	Richard	583	35.4	–
Unknown	Clarke	269	16.3	–
Total valid votes		1,649	100.0	

1887 Canadian federal election
Party	Candidate	Votes	%
Conservative	Joseph Royal	1,081	58.1
Independent Liberal	Joseph Ernest Cyr	778	41.9
Total valid votes		1,859	100.0

1882 Canadian federal election
Party	Candidate	Votes
Conservative	Joseph Royal	acclaimed

Canadian federal by-election, 30 December 1879
Party	Candidate	Votes	%
Conservative	Joseph Royal	652	62.6
Unknown	John Molloy	269	25.8
Unknown	S. Hamelin	121	11.6
Total valid votes		1,042	100.0
Called upon Mr. Dubuc being appointed Puisne Judge of the Court of Queen's Bench for Manitoba.

1878 Canadian federal election
Party	Candidate	Votes
Conservative	Joseph Dubuc	acclaimed

By-election on 31 March 1875 On Mr. Riel being unseated and declared an outlaw, 25 February 1875
Party	Candidate	Votes
Liberal	Andrew Bannatyne	acclaimed

By-election on 3 September 1874 On Mr. Riel being expelled from the House of Commons, 16 April 1874
Party	Candidate	Votes
Independent	Louis Riel	acclaimed

1874 Canadian federal election
Party	Candidate	Votes	%
Independent	Louis Riel	195	73.9
Unknown	J. Hamelin	69	26.1
Total valid votes		264	100.0
Source: lop.parl.ca

Canadian federal by-election, October 13, 1873 Death of George-Étienne Cartier
Party	Candidate	Votes	%	±%
Independent	Louis Riel	Acclaimed	–	–
Total valid votes		–	–	–
Independent gain from Conservative		Swing		–
Source: Parliament of Canada

1872 Canadian federal election
Party	Candidate	Votes
Liberal–Conservative	George-Étienne Cartier	acclaimed
Source: Canadian Elections Database

Canadian federal by-election, 3 March 1871
Party	Candidate	Votes	%
Conservative	Pierre Delorme	172	85.6
Liberal	William Dease	29	14.4
Total valid votes		201	100.0
Called as a result of Manitoba joining Confederation, 15 July 1870.

== See also ==
- List of Canadian electoral districts
- Historical federal electoral districts of Canada
