= Warner Jorgenson =

Canadian politician (1918–2005)

Warner Herbert Jorgenson
- Official 1966 portrait

Member of the Canadian Parliament for Provencher
- In office June 10, 1957 – June 25, 1968
- Preceded by: René Jutras
- Succeeded by: Mark Smerchanski

Member of the Legislative Assembly of Manitoba for Morris
- In office February 20, 1969 – November 17, 1981
- Preceded by: Harry Shewman
- Succeeded by: Clayton Manness

Personal details
- Born: 26 March 1918 Canora, Saskatchewan
- Died: 30 July 2005 (aged 87) Winnipeg, Manitoba
- Party: Progressive Conservative
- Other political affiliations: Progressive Conservative Party of Manitoba
- Spouse: Corrine Ansell ("Pat")
- Profession: farmer
- Cabinet: Minister of Government Services and Manitoba Public Insurance Corporation (1981); Minister of Consumer and Corporate Affairs (1979–1981); Minister of Consumer and Corporate Affairs (1978–1979); Minister responsible for Rent Stabilization Board (1978–1981); Minister responsible for Office of Superintendent of Insurance (1978–1981); Government House Leader (1977–1979); Minister Without Portfolio (1977–1978)

Warner Herbert Jorgenson (26 March 1918 – 30 July 2005) was a Canadian politician in Manitoba. He served as a Progressive Conservative member of the House of Commons of Canada from 1957 to 1968, and as a Progressive Conservative member of the Manitoba Legislature from 1969 to 1981. From 1977 to 1981, he was a cabinet minister in the provincial government of Sterling Lyon.

== Early life ==
Born in Canora, Saskatchewan, the son of George Jorgenson and Hilma Naslund, Jorgenson attended school at Ste-Elizabeth, Manitoba and Dominion City, Manitoba before becoming a farmer at Ste-Elizabeth.

Jorgenson served overseas with the Canadian Army from 1940 to 1946, and worked as a farmer on returning to Canada. He also served as President of the Riverview Golf and Country Club, and was an Honorary President of the Valley Agricultural Society.

== Federal politics ==
He was first elected to the House of Commons in the general election of 1957, defeating longtime Liberal MP Rene Jutras by 250 votes in the southeastern Manitoba riding of Provencher. In the election of 1958, he was re-elected by a greater margin over Liberal Rene Prefontaine. He was not called to join John Diefenbaker's cabinet, but became parliamentary secretary to the Minister of Agriculture in 1960.

Jorgenson was re-elected in the election of 1962 and the election of 1963, defeating Liberal Stan Roberts on both occasions. In the 1965 election, he defeated Liberal Gordon Barkman by about 1,000 votes. He was defeated in the 1968 election by Mark Smerchanski, a leading organizer in the provincial Liberal party.

== Provincial politics ==
Jorgenson then shifted to provincial politics, and was easily elected for the rural riding of Morris in the 1969 by-election. He did not serve in the cabinet of Walter Weir. He was easily re-elected in the provincial election of 1969, despite the Tories losing power to the NDP.

Jorgenson was again re-elected without difficulty in the election of 1973 and the election of 1977. The Tories regained power under Sterling Lyon on the latter occasion, and Jorgenson was called into cabinet on 24 October 1977 as government House Leader and Minister without Portfolio. On 20 October 1978, he was promoted to Minister of Consumer and Corporate Affairs with responsibility for the Rent Stabilization Board and the Office of Superintendent for Insurance. Following a cabinet shuffle on 16 January 1981, he was named Minister of Government Services with responsibility for the Manitoba Public Insurance Corporation. He was known in the legislature as an aggressive debater.

He was not a candidate in the 1981 election, and did not seek public office again.

During his final years, Warner Jorgenson had Alzheimer's disease. He died at Winnipeg's Deer Lodge Centre on 30 July 2005 at the age of 87.

== Electoral record ==
Manitoba provincial by-election, February 20, 1969: Morris (electoral district) Death of Harry Shewman
Party	Candidate	Votes	%	±%	Expenditures
Progressive Conservative	Warner Jorgenson	2,146	65.77	17.97	$966.85
Liberal	Ralph Rasmussen	841	25.77	-14.78	$526.56
New Democratic	William T. Loftus	276	8.46	-3.19	$770.61
Total valid votes		3,263	–	–	
Rejected		15	–		
Eligible voters / turnout		5,284	62.07	–	
Source(s) Source: Manitoba. Chief Electoral Officer (1999). Statement of Votes for the 37th Provincial General Election, September 21, 1999 (PDF) (Report). Winnipeg: Elections Manitoba.

1968 Canadian federal election: Provencher
Party	Candidate	Votes	%	±%
Liberal	Mark Smerchanski	9,021	41.6	+2.7
Progressive Conservative	Warner Jorgenson	7,791	36.0	-12.1
New Democratic	Harry Blake-Knox	3,078	14.2	+10.2
Social Credit	Lorne Reznowski	1,773	8.2	-0.7
Total valid votes		21,663	100.0	

1965 Canadian federal election: Provencher
Party	Candidate	Votes	%	±%
Progressive Conservative	Warner Jorgenson	6,470	48.1	+2.0
Liberal	Gordon Barkman	5,243	39.0	+2.3
Social Credit	Wilbert J. Tinkler	1,195	8.9	-8.3
New Democratic	Francis Clement Anderson	542	4.0	–
Total valid votes		13,450	100.0	

1963 Canadian federal election: Provencher
Party	Candidate	Votes	%	±%
Progressive Conservative	Warner Jorgenson	6,729	46.1	+2.6
Liberal	Stan C. Roberts	5,351	36.7	-0.4
Social Credit	Elie J. Dorge	2,512	17.2	-0.3
Total valid votes		14,592	100.0	

1962 Canadian federal election: Provencher
Party	Candidate	Votes	%	±%
Progressive Conservative	Warner Jorgenson	6,214	43.5	-11.0
Liberal	Stan C. Roberts	5,290	37.1	+2.4
Social Credit	John P. Loewen	2,504	17.5	+8.6
New Democratic	Peter Kruszelnicki	263	1.8	0.0
Total valid votes		14,271	100.0	

Note: NDP vote is compared to CCF vote in 1958 election.

1958 Canadian federal election: Provencher
Party	Candidate	Votes	%	±%
Progressive Conservative	Warner Jorgenson	8,278	54.5	+19.3
Liberal	René Préfontaine	5,268	34.7	+1.3
Social Credit	Wilbert James Tinkler	1,363	9.0	-20.7
Co-operative Commonwealth	Jacob John Siemens	281	1.8	0.0
Total valid votes		15,190	100.0	

1957 Canadian federal election: Provencher
Party	Candidate	Votes	%	±%
Progressive Conservative	Warner Jorgenson	4,739	35.2	+13.8
Liberal	René Jutras	4,489	33.3	-32.6
Social Credit	Hugh M. Campbell	3,992	29.6	+17.0
Co-operative Commonwealth	Charles Biesick	246	1.8	–
Total valid votes		13,466	100.0	
