= Horace Chevrier =

Canadian politician from Manitoba

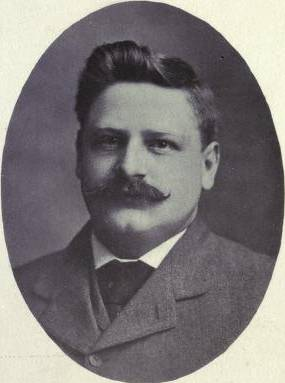

Member of the Legislative Assembly of Manitoba for St. Boniface
- In office 1903–1907

Personal details
- Born: December 15, 1876 Ottawa, Ontario
- Died: January 12, 1935 (aged 58) Winnipeg, Manitoba

Horace Chevrier (December 15, 1876 – January 12, 1935) was a merchant and political figure in Manitoba. He represented St. Boniface from 1903 to 1907 in the Legislative Assembly of Manitoba as a Liberal.

He was born in Ottawa, the son of Noah Chevrier and Isabelle Johnson, and came to Winnipeg with his parents in 1878. Chevrier was educated there and in St. Boniface. He entered business in his father's store after completing his schooling. In 1895, Chevrier married Margaret Gingras. He was defeated when he ran for reelection in 1907 and again in 1910 in the Carillon riding. Chevrier married Annie, the daughter of Alexander Kittson, in 1907 after the death of his first wife,

He was president of the Retail Merchants’ Association of Canada. Chevrier died at home in Winnipeg after an extended illness.
