= Joseph Ernest Cyr =

Canadian politician

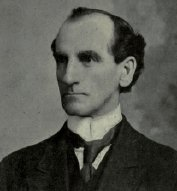

Member of the Canadian Parliament for Provencher
- In office 1904–1908
- Preceded by: Alphonse Alfred Clément Larivière
- Succeeded by: John Patrick Molloy

Member of the Legislative Assembly of Manitoba from St. Boniface
- In office 1883–1888

Personal details
- Born: September 4, 1854 Montreal, Canada East
- Died: April 12, 1929 (aged 74)
- Party: Liberal

Joseph Ernest Cyr (September 4, 1854 – April 12, 1929) was a Canadian politician.

Born in Montreal, Quebec, the son of Michel Cyr and Mary-Louise Moquin, Cyr was educated at St. Laurent College near Montreal. He moved to St. Boniface, Manitoba in 1882 and was mayor in 1885. A notary, he was elected to the Legislative Assembly of Manitoba in an 1883 by-election held following the death of Alexander Kittson. Cyr was defeated when he ran for reelection to the Manitoba assembly in 1888. He was an unsuccessful candidate for the federal riding of Provencher in 1887, then was elected to the House of Commons of Canada for Provencher in 1904. In 1910, Cyr was named Superintendent of Dominion Public Works in Winnipeg.

He married Adelaide Cesarine Senez in 1875.

== Electoral history ==
1908 Canadian federal election: Provencher
Party	Candidate	Votes	%	±%
Liberal	John Patrick Molloy	2,719	54.6	+4.5
Conservative	Alphonse-Alfred-Clément Larivière	2,259	45.4	-4.5
Total valid votes		4,978	100.0	
