= Canada Party =

1993 political party in Canada

The Canada Party was a short-lived political party in Canada that nominated 56 candidates in the 1993 federal election and one candidate in a 1996 by-election. It was unable to win any seats. The party was populist and ran on a platform of banking and monetary reform. It also advocated direct democracy, referendums and recall elections and opposition to official bilingualism.

It drew supporters from the former Social Credit Party and the Confederation of Regions Party Many of the party's supporters were members of the Committee on Monetary and Economic Reform, and later joined the Canadian Action Party. Some had been active in the Canadian social credit movement which shared similar views on monetary reform.

One element of their direct democracy policy was the proposal that the prime minister and cabinet members be elected by the government party's caucus in the House of Commons of Canada. The party argued that this would remove the power that the prime minister currently has to command loyalty from caucus members in return for the rewards of more authority in the government, e.g., appointments to Cabinet or to parliamentary secretary positions.

The party was founded by Joseph Thauberger, a Regina businessman in his 80s, who had been an unsuccessful Social Credit Party of Canada candidate in the 1972 election. Saskatchewan and British Columbia were the main sources of the party's membership. The first national meeting was held in Toronto a few weeks before the 1993 election. The party won 7,506 votes in that election, 0.055 percent of votes nationwide and 0.301 percent in those 56 ridings.

During a televised forum of minor party leaders, Thauberger said to Neil Paterson, the leader of the Natural Law Party of Canada, "For the life of me, I can't imagine how you expect to meditate away the national debt!"

In 1994, Thauberger stepped down and was replaced by Claire Foss at a meeting in Winnipeg. In the run-up to the 1997 election, the party's board voted to support Paul Hellyer's Canadian Action Party because of that party's support for monetary reform. Foss ran as a CAP candidate in Okanagan—Shuswap, where he received the largest number of votes of any CAP candidate. Foss was also a CAP candidate in the 2004 election; however, he fared poorly at the polls.

== See also ==
- List of political parties in Canada
- Canada Party candidates, 1993 Canadian federal election
