= Walking in Two Worlds (Wab Kinew novel) =

2021 novel by Wab Kinew

- Author: Wab Kinew
- Language: English
- Genre: Science Fiction, Indigenous futurism, Children's literature
- Publisher: Penguin Random House
- Publication date: 2021
- Pages: 288
- ISBN: 9780735269002
- Followed by: The Everlasting Road

Walking in Two Worlds is the first novel by the Anishinaabe writer Wab Kinew. The title was glossed by Kirkus Reviews with the comment that its protagonists navigate "different worlds: real and virtual, colonized and Indigenous".

== Summary ==
The story is set in North America in the near future, some years after the Covid-19 Pandemic. Changing smartphone technology has made both virtual-reality and augmented-reality gaming ubiquitous among young people, and has also enabled simultaneous machine translation of speech. The most popular game is Floraverse, a massively multiplayer open-source game whose independence from centralised control is guaranteed by its use of blockchain technology.

Bugz (Bagonegiizhigok Holiday) is a teenage Anishinaabe girl, great-great-great-great-granddaughter of "a big chief" called Bagonegiizhig. She lives on a reserve, where her mother is the community's first female chief; Bugz is a prominent member of the community and participant in its traditions, but struggles with low self-esteem. Over the two years prior to the events of Walking in Two Worlds, however, Bugz has also become the world's most successful Floraverse player. Unbeknownst to everyone else, she has discovered that, because of what she believes is a glitch in the software, a real-world thunderbird nest on her reservation and its counterpart in the Floraverse give her a unique ability to make (and sell) weapons of awesome power, and to resurrect her character when it is killed. Inspired by Anishinaabe culture, Bugz has created thunderbirds and Mishi-pizhiw. Bugz's success has brought her world-wide fame, and both in-game and real-world wealth. Bugz is a particular inspiration to other Indigenous and female players.

In the Floraverse, Bugz's arch-enemy is Alpha, who, after being cyberbullied, forms a racist, misogynist, alt-right faction within the Floraverse called Clan:LESS. Their trolling makes the Floraverse less pleasant for players such as Bugz.

The doctor on Bugz's reserve is a Uyghur, Liumei, who came to Canada as a refugee from China's persecution of the Uyghurs. Liumei's nephew Feng (whose original name, we later learn, was Farouq) was taken from his parents at the age of seven, told they did not love him when in fact they had been incarcerated in a Xinjiang internment camp, and assimilated into China's dominant Han culture. Feng finds a sense of identity and community, however, within the Floraverse when Alpha invites him to join Clan:LESS. Feng's commitment to this extremist group attracts the disapproval of China's government; unwilling to abandon the Floraverse, Feng flees to North America to live with Liumei.

Bugz and Feng meet at school, where, without realising their Floraverse identities, they are immediately attracted to one another. Within the game, Bugz later encounters Feng while fighting against Clan:LESS. She spares his life, and both in real life and within the Floraverse begins to date Feng and detach him from his alt-right commitments.

In a key scene, Liumei and Feng are invited to a sweat. Bugz is enraged that she is not allowed to participate because she is on her period, provoking her to muse on the limitations of Anishinaabe customs. Yet Feng experiences a breakthrough in starting to come to terms with the trauma caused by his re-education in China and flight to Canada. But Bugz's beloved elder brother, Waawaate (whose name means "aurora borealis"), collapses during the sweat, and is soon diagnosed with cancer that is probably terminal.

Within the Floraverse, Clan:LESS manage to attach a tracking device to Feng before he defects to Bugz. This allows them to find the in-game thunderbird nest that is the source of Bugz's power. Seizing it, they begin to inflict defeats on Bugz and Feng and to destroy Bugz's creations. Believing that Feng has betrayed her, Bugz kills his character. Moreover, Clan:LESS identify the real-world thunderbird nest on the reserve and destroy that too, assaulting Bugz when she interrupts them. Seizing Bugz's phone, Alpha deletes Bugz's Floraverse character. Lacking the power of the thunderbird nest, Bugz can no-longer resurrect her character.

Driven to distraction by her brother's illness, her break-up with Feng, real-world abuse by Clan:LESS, and the collapse of her life in the Floraverse, Bugz returns to the site of the thunderbird nest, contemplating suicide. Feng rushes to save her, and, apparently through the spiritual influence of Waawaate and the Aurora Borealis, both Feng and Bugz have cathartic visions. They reconcile, and Waawaate reignites the power of the site, enabling Bugz to resurrect her Floraverse character once more.

== Anishinaabemowin content ==
Several characters in the book speak the Indigenous North American language Anishinaabemowin. The book includes a glossary of "Anishinaabe terms" containing the following words and phrases:

word	pronunciation according to Kinew	Kinew's transation
Anama’edaa	ah-numb-ah-yay-TAH	Let us pray
Anishinaabe	a-nish-in-NAH-bay	Ojibwe or Indigenous
Bagonegiizhigok	bug-oh-nay-KEESH-ig-oak	Hole in the day
Baakinan	buck-in-NONE	Open it!
Binesi	bin-NEH-see	Thunderbird
Eniwek igo kiga’onji-pimaadiz ndiwe’igan	AY-knee-wake EE-go key-gohn-jih-pee-MAH-tizz in-tay-WAY-gun	Through my drum you will live just that much more
Kookom	COOK-em	Grandmother
Mishi-pizhiw	mi-SHIP-i-shoe	A supernatural being in Anishinaabe culture
Nameg	nah-MAYK	Sturgeon (plural)
Ni-noonde-pimaadiz	nih-known-day-pee-MAH-tizz	I want to live
Onizhishin Anishinaabe Aking	oh-NISH-ish-in ah-nish-in-NAW-bay AH-king	Anishinaabe country is beautiful
Onjine	OWN-jin-nay	The way you behave will come back to you
Patai’itiwin	put-TIE-it-tee-win	The way you behave will come back to your children
Waawaate	WAH-wah-tay	The northern lights

== Reception ==
Kirkus Reviews recommended the book for 14–18-year-olds, Publishers Weekly as "12-up", and Booklist for grades 7–10.

Kirkus concluded that "Kinew (Anishinaabe) has crafted a story that balances heart-pounding action scenes with textured family and community relationships, all seamlessly undergirded by storytelling that conveys an Indigenous community's past—and the vibrant future that follows from young people's active, creative engagement with their culture." Meanwhile, Rob Bittner found that "Kinew [...] explores real-world teen struggles with identity, toxic masculinity, and complicated family and cultural dynamics, as well as generational shifts relating to (and relying on) technology, all set against the backdrop of a post-pandemic, high-tech future".

The book received an Aurora Award for science fiction and fantasy in 2022.
