= 2024 Tuxedo provincial by-election =

Manitoba by-election

- June 18, 2024

Riding of Tuxedo
- Turnout: 45.62% (▼14.24 pp)
	First party	Second party	Third party
	NDP	PC	LIB
Candidate	Carla Compton	Lawrence Pinsky	Jamie Pfau
Party	New Democratic	Progressive Conservative	Liberal
Popular vote	3,777	3,175	569
Percentage	49.44%	41.56%	7.45%
Swing	▲11.95%	▲1.36%	▼14.85%
MLA before election
Heather Stefanson
Progressive Conservative
Elected MLA
Carla Compton
New Democratic

The 2024 Tuxedo provincial by-election was held on June 18.

In an historic result, the NDP won the election with 49% to the PC's 42%, the first time the party has ever won the seat since its creation in 1981, and the first time a centre-left party won the area since 1945 when the NDP's predecessor, the CCF, won the Assiniboia constituency. The third-place Liberal Party's 7% vote share was the worst result the party ever received in the constituency.

== Background ==
The riding was vacant after former Premier Heather Stefanson resigned from the Legislative Assembly on May 6, 2024.

On May 20, Premier Wab Kinew announced that a by-election would be held in Tuxedo on June 18.

== Constituency ==
Tuxedo is an affluent, traditionally safe Tory seat in southwest Winnipeg. In addition to Stefanson, it was the riding of former premier Gary Filmon. The riding has voted for the Progressive Conservatives in every election since its creation in 1981. Despite the riding being considered safe, the NDP came within 268 votes of picking it up in the 2023 general election.

== Candidates ==
=== Progressive Conservative ===
A nomination meeting to determine the PC candidate was held on May 23 with family lawyer Lawrence Pinsky winning the contested race. The other candidates seeking the nomination were Shannon Martin (MLA for McPhillips, 2019–2023 and Morris, 2014–2019) and Lori Shenkarow (real estate agent).

Kevin Klein (MLA for Kirkfield Park, 2022–2023 and Winnipeg City Councillor for Charleswood-Tuxedo-Westwood, 2018–2022) was also considered a potential candidate, however, he ended up not running.

=== New Democratic ===
On May 20, the NDP announced that they had nominated Carla Compton as the candidate for the by-election. She works as a registered nurse and was the Tuxedo candidate for the party in the 2019 election.

=== Liberal ===
On May 21, The Liberals announced that their candidate would be Jamie Pfau, president of the Manitoba Foster Parent Association.

Deputy leader of the party, Willard Reaves, who ran for the party in Fort Whyte in 2022 and 2023 sought the nomination before bowing out of the race and supporting Pfau.

=== Green ===
On May 20, it was announced that the leader of the Green Party, Janine Gibson would be the candidate for the by-election.

== Results ==
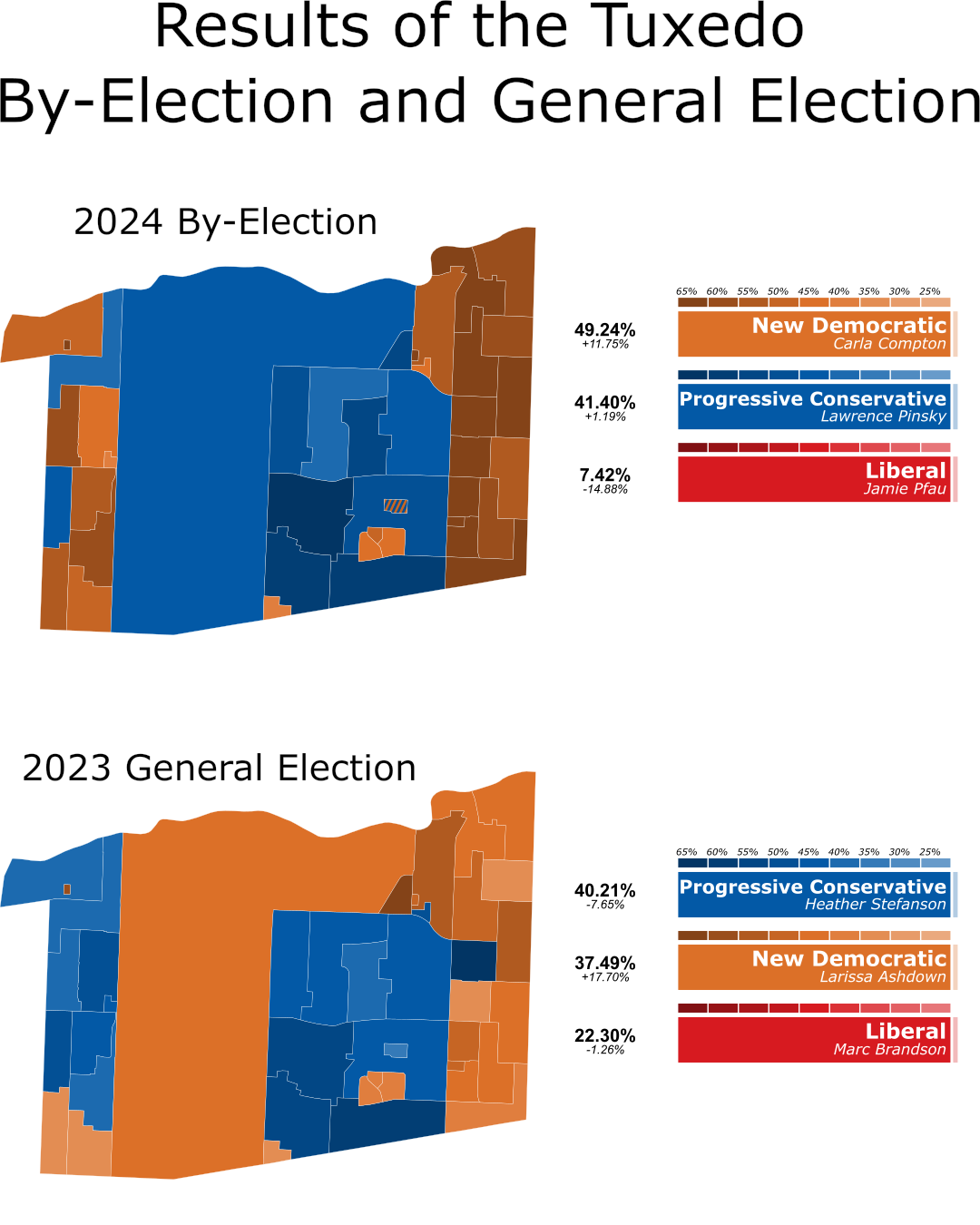
Map of by-election and 2023 general election results.

Manitoba provincial by-election, June 18, 2024: Tuxedo Resignation of Heather Stefanson
Party	Candidate	Votes	%	±%	Expenditures
New Democratic	Carla Compton	3,777	49.44	+11.95	
Progressive Conservative	Lawrence Pinsky	3,175	41.56	+1.36	
Liberal	Jamie Pfau	569	7.45	-14.85	
Green	Janine Gibson	118	1.54		
Total valid votes		7,639	99.58		
Total rejected and declined ballots		32	0.42	+0.01	
Turnout		7,671	45.62	-14.24	
Eligible voters		16,814			
New Democratic gain from Progressive Conservative		Swing		+5.30	

== Previous results ==
2023 Manitoba general election: Tuxedo
Party	Candidate	Votes	%	±%	Expenditures
Progressive Conservative	Heather Stefanson	3,968	40.21	-7.65	$10,145.15
New Democratic	Larissa Ashdown	3,700	37.49	+17.70	$1,572.48
Liberal	Marc Brandson	2,201	22.30	-1.26	$5,309.68
Total valid votes/expense limit		9,869	99.60	–	$64,529.00
Total rejected and declined ballots		40	0.40	-0.40	
Turnout		9,909	59.86	+1.96	
Eligible voters		16,554			
Progressive Conservative hold		Swing		-12.67	
Source(s) Source: Elections Manitoba
