= 2022 Winnipeg serial killings =

Series of crimes in Manitoba, Canada

Between March and May 2022, four Indigenous-Canadian women – Rebecca Contois, Morgan Harris, Marcedes Myran, and Ashlee Shingoose (initially unidentified until March 2025 and referred to as Mashkode Bizhiki'ikwe or Buffalo Woman) – were murdered by Jeremy Skibicki. He was charged for the murders on December 1, 2022. On July 11, 2024, he was found guilty on all four counts of first-degree murder, and he was sentenced to four life sentences in August 2024.

Investigations by Global News and CBC News revealed that Skibicki had a pattern of spousal abuse, with two previous partners having been allegedly assaulted, threatened, and raped by Skibicki. Both partners were of Indigenous (Métis) descent. Further investigations of Skibicki's Facebook account revealed a pattern of misogynistic, violent, anti-semitic, and white supremacist behaviour. No RCMP official investigation has been launched in the public. The killings prompted an emergency debate in the House of Commons regarding the ongoing epidemic of violence against Indigenous women and girls.

A motion proposing the creation of a "Red Dress Alert" by MP Leah Gazan was unanimously adopted by the House of Commons, citing the murders in a letter to Public Safety Minister Marco Mendicino. Ahead of the 2023 Manitoba general election, the ruling Progressive Conservatives campaigned against searching the landfill for the remains of Myran and Harris. The Progressive Conservatives lost the 2023 election to the New Democrats, who promised a search for the women's remains at the Prairie Green Landfill if elected.

== Victims ==
Four individuals are thought to have been victims of Skibicki. Three of the four were Indigenous women, and the fourth individual is thought to additionally be of Indigenous ancestry. Family members of several of the women stated that they were homeless at the time.

Ashlee Shingoose, previously known as the Mashkode Bizhiki'ikwe/Buffalo Woman (c. March 15, 2022) was an unidentified woman of possible Indigenous descent. She was thought to be in her mid twenties and living in Winnipeg at the time. She was previously referred to as "Jane Doe" or as an unidentified victim, but discussions among advocates and Indigenous elders led to the adoption of the name "Buffalo Woman", which the Winnipeg police adopted.

The name was given to refer to the buffalo spirit which gave her name to individuals who had not received a spirit name in order to know one another, and allow for the acknowledgement of Buffalo Woman by the spirit realm. Buffalo Woman was thought to have worn a Baby Phat brand reversible jacket with a fur hood. The Buffalo Woman was identified in March 2025 as Ashlee Shingoose, a 31-year-old woman from St. Theresa Point First Nation who was last seen at Winnipeg's downtown Salvation Army.

Morgan Beatrice Harris (1982 or 1983 – c. May 1, 2022) was a member of the Long Plain First Nation and lived in Winnipeg at the time. She was 39 years old, a mother of five and a grandmother of one. Harris was last seen in the area of Winnipeg's Main Street and Henry Avenue.

Marcedes Myran (November 9, 1995 – May 4, 2022) was a member of the Long Plain First Nation and lived in Winnipeg at the time. She was 26 years old and a mother of two. Myran was last seen in the North End neighborhood of Winnipeg.

Rebecca Stacey Contois (January 27, 1998 – May 14–15, 2022) was a member of the O-Chi-Chak-Ko-Sipi First Nation and lived in Winnipeg at the time. She was 24 years old and a mother of one.

== Perpetrator ==
Jeremy Skibicki
- Born: Jeremy Anthony Micheal Skibicki; 1986 or 1987 (age 38–39)
- Criminal charges: First-degree murder (4 counts)
- Criminal penalty: Life imprisonment with possibility of parole after 25 years

Jeremy Anthony Micheal Skibicki was charged with four counts of first-degree murder for the killings of Contois, Myran, Harris, and Buffalo Woman. A representative for Skibicki stated that his client would plead not guilty. Skibicki admitted to the murders but entered a not criminally responsible plea. On July 11, 2024, the plea was denied, and he was found guilty for the murders.

Born in Winnipeg, he was adopted by a Polish family. Skibicki's birth mother was originally from Newfoundland and Labrador.

Skibicki has a documented history of abuse against his partners. In June 2015, Skibicki was convicted following the assault of his common-law partner. The woman, who was pregnant at the time, was strangled by Skibicki and was punched repeatedly in the face. Skibicki threatened to kill the woman if she attempted to call the police.

The woman filed for a protection order but the order was dismissed. Skibicki allegedly expressed violent fantasies towards his previous partner, and had smothered his partner so hard that her teeth began bleeding. He was sentenced to two months in prison and two years probation for the assault.

In 2019, Skibicki's then-wife filed a protection order against him at their first wedding anniversary. In 2021, Skibicki was charged with disobeying court orders, threatening her, and assaulting her with a deadly weapon. Skibicki told his then-wife that he would kill, torture, traffic, or abduct her. She had alleged that she was abused by her husband, including having been raped by him while she was asleep and suffocated with a pillow. In May 2022, his then-wife filed paperwork for a divorce. Another assault charge against him, for allegedly attacking his spouse, was stayed. Both of Skibicki's previous partners were Indigenous, and were of Métis descent.

Following an investigation by CBC News, it was found that Skibicki's personal Facebook page contained violent material, in addition to antisemitic, misogynistic, and white supremacist material. Skibicki described himself as a member of "Holy Europe", the "Alliance of Patriotic Parallel Movements of European Folks" (APPMEF), a far-right organization which promotes the belief that white Europeans need to preserve their bloodlines from being diluted by race-mixing, multiculturalism, and immigration.

== Investigation and search for remains ==
The killings were committed between the months of March and May 2022. Police believe Buffalo Woman was killed on or around March 15. Marcedes Myran's last contact with her family took place around this time.

Investigators believe that Harris was killed on May 1, 2022, the day she was last seen alive.

Police suspect that Myran was killed on May 4, 2022. Myran's family reported her missing on September 26, 2022, reluctant to find something had happened to her.

Police allege that Contois was killed either on May 14 or on May 15, 2022.

On May 16, 2022, Rebecca Contois's partial remains were found in a garbage bin near an apartment complex in Winnipeg's North Kildonan neighbourhood. Authorities described it as a "horrifically grisly scene". It was believed that as part of the residential pickup, some of Contois' remains had been transported to the Brady Road landfill.

On May 24, 2022, authorities issued an alert asking for help in finding Harris.

Authorities began searching the Brady Road landfill for the rest of Contois' remains on June 2, 2022, following the lighting of a sacred fire. They were joined by authorities from the Ka Ni Kanichihk's Medicine Bear Counselling Program and the Manitoba Keewatinowi Okimakanak's missing, murdered and Indigenous women and girls liaison unit. On June 21, 2022, some of Contois' remains were found at the Brady Road landfill.

=== Prairie Green Landfill search and debate ===
On the same day that Contois's initial remains were found in a garbage bin on May 16, 2022, the remains of Myran and Harris, which were in a dumpster several blocks away, were picked up and taken to the Prairie Greenland landfill in the Rural Municipality of Rosser, just north of Winnipeg.

The site was closed down briefly in June 2022. The fact was not disclosed publicly until it was shared publicly by a group tasked to oversee a feasibility study on the recovery of the remains. Homicide investigators determined on June 20, 2022, that it was likely that the two's remains would be in the Prairie Green Landfill. By then, 10,000 garbage loads had been added to the site since the remains had been taken there.

Police announced on December 6, 2022, that it would not be feasible to search the site for the bodies of Myran and Harris. Premier Heather Stefanson called for operations on the landfill to be paused on December 8, 2022, but announced on December 15 that only a single cell's activities were paused following an announcement on December 8. The federal government announced on December 15, 2022, that it would cover the cost for an Indigenous-led feasibility study on the recovery of the remains at the landfill. Stefanson pledged support for the study the following day.

The Assembly of Manitoba Chiefs, who oversaw the feasibility study, stated that a search could be undertaken as early as April 2023. The study found that it could cost up to $184 million, an estimate later found to be excessive.

A potential search of the site became an issue in the 2023 Manitoba general election, with the incumbent Progressive Conservatives opposing and campaigning on their opposition and the New Democratic Party of Manitoba and leader Wab Kinew supporting a search.

After winning the election, the premier Kinew launched a search for the remains of Myran and Harris in December 2024. Defeated premier Stefanson later apologized for running ads highlighting her party's commitment to not search the landfill. The provincial and federal governments each contributed $20 million to fund the search, which was expected to last throughout 2025.

The remains of Morgan Harris and Marcedes Myran were found on February 26, 2025, at the landfill. Harris and Myran were respectively identified by police on March 7 and March 17, 2025. Kinew stated that as a result of the quick discovery, the search was significantly under budget.

=== Discovery of Linda Mary Beardy's body ===
The body of Linda Mary Beardy was discovered by workers at the Brady Road Resource Management Facility on April 4, 2023, and reported to authorities. Beardy was a member of the Lake St. Martin First Nation and lived in Winnipeg before her death. Her death initially raised suspicions that there was a connection to the deaths of Skibicki's four other victims, who were suspected to be located at nearby landfills, as some of Contois' remains were found at the same site as Beardy's. Beardy's discovery renewed calls for searches of the landfills by the families of Skibicki's victims.

Winnipeg Police later determined that Beardy was not a victim of homicide, after witnesses reported seeing her climbing into a garbage bin, which was later picked up by a truck, hours before her body was found. Police chief Danny Smyth stated there were "no other injuries that suggest any kind of foul play."

Beardy's family released a statement criticizing the approach Winnipeg police took in their transparency and expressed concerns that the Winnipeg police "may not be compelled to complete a thorough investigation."

== Criminal proceedings and conviction ==
Skibicki was charged by authorities on May 18, 2022, for the killing of Contois. Shortly after being detained, Skibicki made a video-taped confession to the killings in police custody. In his confession he said of the murders: "I believe this was something that God called me to do".

On December 1, 2022, police announced that Skibicki was charged with three counts of first degree murder for the additional killings of Harris, Myran, and Buffalo Woman.

Skibicki appeared in court on December 2, 2022; his case would go directly to trial without holding a preliminary hearing.

On November 6, 2023, in a pretrial hearing, Skibicki pleaded not guilty and made a motion that the trial should be heard by a judge rather than a jury, a motion that the Crown opposed. On January 24, 2024, a judge ruled that Skibicki did not have a right to a trial before a judge without the Crown's consent.

In May 2024, after Skibicki's legal team decided not to contest whether or not Skibicki killed the women and focus on seeking a finding of not criminally responsible due to mental disorder, both sides agreed to a judge-only trial.

On July 11, Glenn Joyal, the chief justice of the Court of King's Bench of Manitoba, found Skibicki guilty on all four counts of first degree murder. On August 28, 2024, Skibicki sentenced to 4 terms of life imprisonment, to be served concurrently, with no possibility of parole for 25 years, when he will be 60 years old.

== Reactions ==
=== Law enforcement ===
Winnipeg Police Chief Danny Smyth stated in a press conference that it was unsettling whenever there is any kind of serial killing, highlighting that the women were Indigenous and stating "We’re very sensitive to the whole missing and murdered Indigenous women investigation and inquiry and the recommendations that came out of that."

=== Government reactions ===
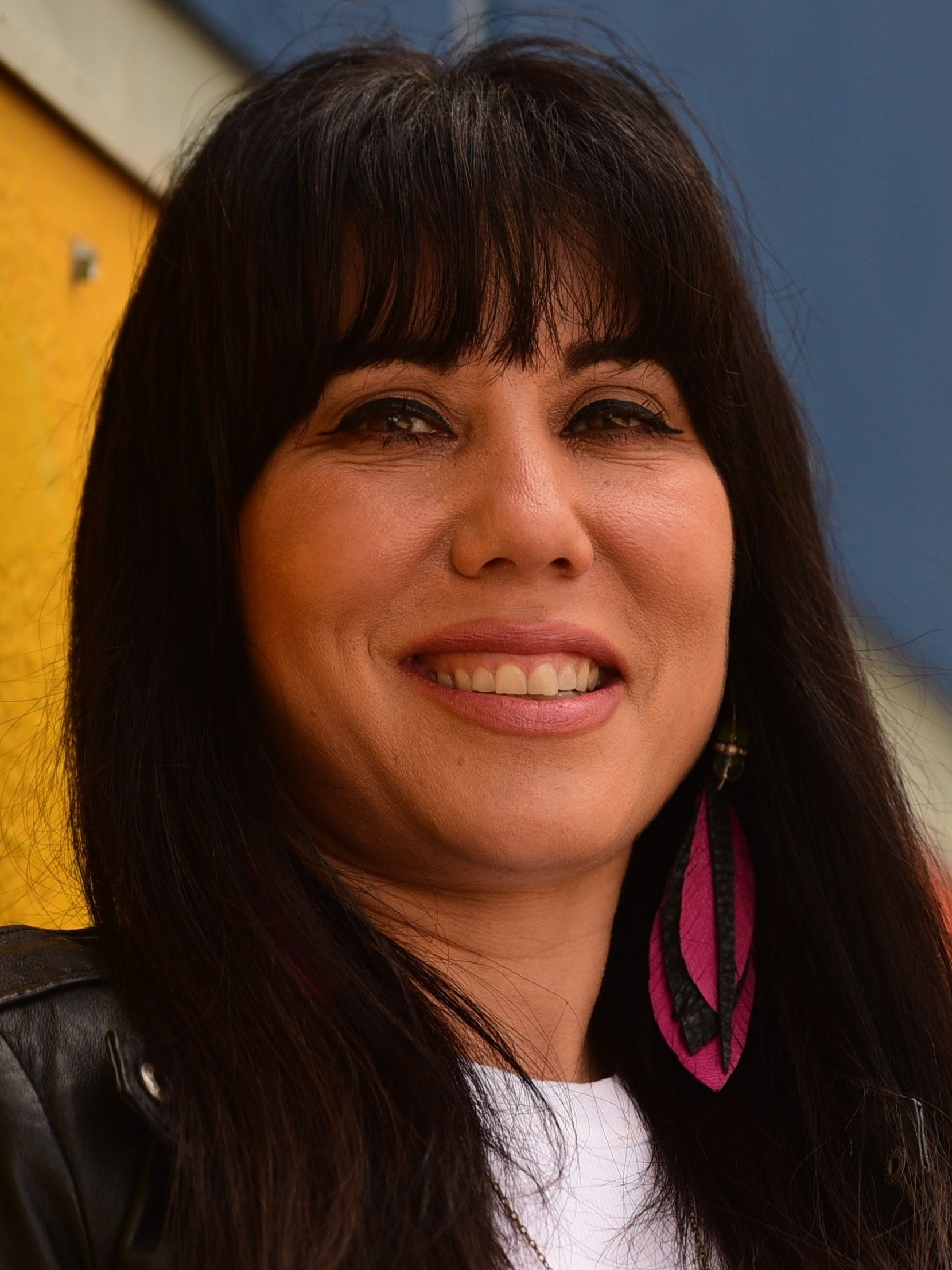
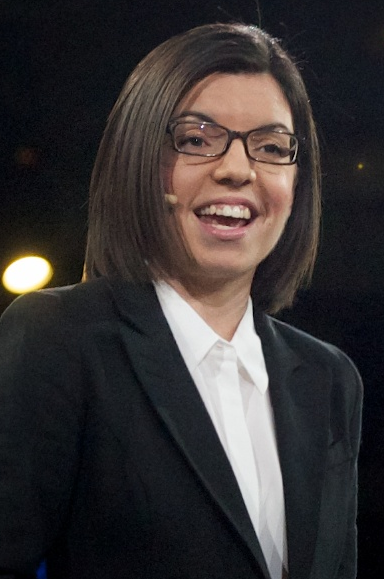
Members of Parliament Leah Gazan (left) and Niki Ashton (right) called for an emergency debate following the revelation of the killings

Winnipeg mayor Scott Gillingham stated "condolences are not strong enough" and that the women were "members of our community ... someone's daughter, someone's sister, someone's mother, someone's friend" in a press conference that there was much more work to be done in protecting Indigenous women and girls, highlighting the vulnerability caused by homelessness, addiction, and poverty.

Members of Parliament Leah Gazan (Winnipeg Centre) and Niki Ashton (Churchill—Keewatinook Aski) proposed an emergency debate in the House of Commons of Canada on the issue of MMIWG2S+ and called for further resources to support vulnerable women following the revelation Skibicki had allegedly killed multiple Indigenous women. The request for a debate was not granted.

Gazan stated: "While the government stalls in providing resources, Indigenous women and girls and two-spirit continue to be murdered." Gazan pressed the Minister of Crown–Indigenous Relations Marc Miller on the decision by the Winnipeg police not to search the Brady Road landfill for the bodies of the three missing Indigenous women, of which Miller remarked that he found the decision "very puzzling". Miller stated his intention to meet with Harris's family, while Gazan met with the families of Harris and Wilson, along with other Indigenous leaders, in a press conference.

MLA for Point Douglas Bernadette Smith, whose sister went missing in 2008, supported the decision to refer to one of the victims as "Buffalo Woman". Smith attended a vigil for missing and murdered Indigenous women held following the announcement of further victims. Shadow Justice Minister Nahanni Fontaine expressed on her Twitter account that community members were feeling "rage, despair, disgust and unspeakable sadness" following the arrest of Skibicki, who she described as a "monster".

Fontaine asked "When will the protection of Indigenous women, girls and two-spirited be taken seriously? Winnipeg now has the distinction of having two separate serial killers of Indigenous women. Are we waiting for a third or fourth to rear their murderous heads?"

Interim PC leader Wayne Ewasko apologized in March 2025 for the PC's 2023 campaign ads promoting their decision not to search the Prairie Green landfill. In May 2025, during Obby Khan's first legislative speech as PC leader after winning the 2025 leadership election, he also apologized for the ads.

=== Indigenous leaders ===
Grand Chief Jerry Daniels of the Southern Chiefs' Organization, which represents two of the reserves that the victims were from, stated: “We will be keeping you in our thoughts and prayers as you grapple with the news that your loved ones have been taken from us in such a violent way.”

Kyra Wilson, Chief of the Long Plain First Nation, where Harris and Myran were from, called for further support for Indigenous women, two-spirit, and gender diverse individuals, in addition to support due to the deaths of two community members. Wilson highlighted the disproportionate violence committed towards Indigenous women for many generations.

The Assembly of First Nations, which was holding a special chief's assembly in Ottawa, held a moment of silence in honour of the victims and their families on December 6, 2022.

=== Community reactions ===
A candlelight vigil was held outside of Skibicki's home on December 1, 2022, for individuals grieving the loss of the women and other loved ones.

== See also ==
- Gilbert Paul Jordan
- Highway of Tears
- List of solved missing person cases (post-2000)
- Missing and murdered Indigenous women
- Robert Pickton
