= Mide-Sun =

Studio album by Wab Kinew
- Released: September 4, 2010
- Genre: Hip hop

Wab Kinew chronology
Live By the Drum (2009)	Mide-Sun (2010)

Mide-Sun is the second album by Canadian former singer-songwriter and current Premier of Manitoba Wab Kinew.

== Track listing ==
No.	Title	Writer(s)	Length
1.	"The Ghost of Crazy Horse"	Wab Kinew	1:37
2.	"Sunshine in My Pocket"	Wab Kinew, Lorenzo	3:46
3.	"The Road"	Wab Kinew	3:35
4.	"Ruler of My Heart"	Wab Kinew, Andrina Turenne	3:54
5.	"Clarence Two Toes Phone Message No. 1"	Wab Kinew	1:00
6.	"Mama Said"	Wab Kinew	3:12
7.	"Okijidaa – Chris Stranger Walk Out Song"	Wab Kinew	4:13
8.	"Give It Up"	Wab Kinew, iskwē	3:00
9.	"Walk Away"	Wab Kinew	3:43
10.	"Clarence Two Toes Phone Message No. 2"	Wab Kinew	1:35
11.	"Airplanes"	Wab Kinew	2:58
12.	"Live My Life"	Wab Kinew, Lorenzo	3:48
13.	"Fuck John Wayne"	Wab Kinew, Red Cloud, Lorenzo	3:19
14.	"Inspire (2oolman)"	Wab Kinew	4:44
15.	"Clarence Two Toes Phone Message No. 3"	Wab Kinew	1:14
16.	"Our Home And Native Land"	Wab Kinew	3:45
17.	"My Love For You"	Wab Kinew, Lorenzo	3:38
18.	"Cheers"	Wab Kinew	3:26
19.	"Clarence Two Toes Phone Message No. 4"	Wab Kinew	1:18
20.	"Heroes"	Wab Kinew	3:57
21.	"Good Boy"	Wab Kinew, Little Hawk, Lorenzo	4:40
22.	"Mide-Sun Music"	Wab Kinew	4:40
