= Tuxedo (electoral district) =

Provincial electoral district in Manitoba, Canada

Coordinates: 49.864°N 97.227°W

Manitoba electoral district
- Location in Winnipeg

Provincial electoral district
- Legislature: Legislative Assembly of Manitoba
MLA
Carla Compton
New Democratic
- District created: 1979
- First contested: 1981
- Last contested: 2024

Demographics
- Census division: Division No. 11
- Census subdivision: Winnipeg

Tuxedo is a provincial electoral district of Manitoba, Canada. It was created by redistribution in 1979, and has formally existed since the provincial election of 1981. The riding is located in the southwest section of the city of Winnipeg.

== Geography ==
Tuxedo is bordered to the east by River Heights, to the south by Roblin and Fort Whyte, to the north by St. James and Kirkfield Park, and to the west by Roblin.

The riding contains the neighbourhoods of Edgeland, J. B. Mitchell, Mathers, Old Tuxedo, Sir John Franklin, South Tuxedo, Tuxedo, Vialoux, as well as Elmhurst and Varsity View east of Laxdal Rd.

== Demographics ==
The riding's population in 1996 was 20,095. The average family income in 1999 was $89,350, almost $40,000 above the provincial average. The unemployment rate was 5.60%. Tuxedo has a significant Jewish population, at 8% of the total. Over 17% of the riding's residents are above 65 years of age, and over 28% have university degrees. Health and social services account for 16% of Tuxedo's industry, with a further 14% in the service sector.

== History ==
Tuxedo was represented by Progressive Conservative MLAs from its creation in 1981 to 2024; both of the two MLAs who served prior to the by-election of 2024 became Premier of Manitoba. Gary Filmon, who served as premier from 1988 until 1999, represented the riding between 1981 and his retirement from politics in 2000. Following Filmon's departure, Heather Stefanson succeeded him as MLA and she held the premiership from 2021 to 2023. Following her resignation in 2024 and the subsequent by-election, the New Democratic Party of Manitoba won the seat for the first time.

== Members of the Legislative Assembly ==
This riding has elected the following MLAs:

Parliament	Years	Member	Party
Riding created from Charleswood and River Heights
32nd	1981–1986	Gary Filmon	Progressive Conservative
33rd	1986–1988	Gary Filmon	Progressive Conservative
34th	1988–1990	Gary Filmon	Progressive Conservative
35th	1990–1995	Gary Filmon	Progressive Conservative
36th	1995–1999	Gary Filmon	Progressive Conservative
37th	1999–2000	Gary Filmon	Progressive Conservative
37th	2000–2003	Heather Stefanson	Progressive Conservative
38th	2003–2007	Heather Stefanson	Progressive Conservative
39th	2007–2011	Heather Stefanson	Progressive Conservative
40th	2011–2016	Heather Stefanson	Progressive Conservative
41st	2016–2019	Heather Stefanson	Progressive Conservative
42nd	2019–2023	Heather Stefanson	Progressive Conservative
43rd	2023–2024	Heather Stefanson	Progressive Conservative
43rd	2024–present	Carla Compton	New Democratic

== Electoral results ==
Manitoba provincial by-election, June 18, 2024 Resignation of Heather Stefanson
Party	Candidate	Votes	%	±%	Expenditures
New Democratic	Carla Compton	3,777	49.44	+11.95	
Progressive Conservative	Lawrence Pinsky	3,175	41.56	+1.36	
Liberal	Jamie Pfau	569	7.45	-14.85	
Green	Janine Gibson	118	1.54		
Total valid votes		7,639	99.58		
Total rejected and declined ballots		32	0.42	+0.01	
Turnout		7,671	45.62	-14.24	
Eligible voters		16,814			
New Democratic gain from Progressive Conservative		Swing		+5.30	

2023 Manitoba general election
Party	Candidate	Votes	%	±%	Expenditures
Progressive Conservative	Heather Stefanson	3,968	40.21	-7.65	$10,145.15
New Democratic	Larissa Ashdown	3,700	37.49	+17.70	$1,572.48
Liberal	Marc Brandson	2,201	22.30	-1.26	$5,309.68
Total valid votes/expense limit		9,869	99.60	–	$64,529.00
Total rejected and declined ballots		40	0.40	-0.40	
Turnout		9,909	59.86	+1.96	
Eligible voters		16,554			
Progressive Conservative hold		Swing		-12.67	
Source(s) Source: Elections Manitoba

2019 Manitoba general election
Party	Candidate	Votes	%	±%	Expenditures
Progressive Conservative	Heather Stefanson	4,645	47.85	-5.2	$21,522.01
Liberal	Marc Brandson	2,287	23.56	+5.0	$4,961.95
New Democratic	Carla Compton	1,921	19.79	+5.5	$614.25
Green	Kristin Lauhn-Jensen	793	8.17	-5.8	$0.00
Manitoba First	Abby Al-Sahi	61	0.63	New	$2,520.94
Total valid votes		9,707	99.19		
Total rejected ballots		79	0.81		
Turnout		9,786	57.90		
Eligible voters		16,903			
Progressive Conservative hold		Swing		-5.1	

2016 provincial election redistributed results
Party	%
Progressive Conservative	53.1
Liberal	18.6
New Democratic	14.3
Green	14.0

2016 Manitoba general election
Party	Candidate	Votes	%	±%	Expenditures
Progressive Conservative	Heather Stefanson	4,986	58.49	+5.75	$24,812.05
New Democratic	Zachary Fleisher	1,312	15.39	-10.00	$1,259.50
Liberal	Micheal Lazar	1,251	14.67	-1.85	$3,715.32
Green	Bob Krul	976	11.45	+6.10	$0.00
Total valid votes/expense limit		8,525	98.52	-	$45,940.00
Total rejected and declined ballots		128	1.48	+1.13	
Turnout		8,653	62.39	+0.08	
Eligible voters		13,869			
Progressive Conservative hold		Swing		+7.88	
Source: Elections Manitoba

2011 Manitoba general election
Party	Candidate	Votes	%	±%	Expenditures
Progressive Conservative	Heather Stefanson	4,839	52.74	+5.48	$27,442.42
New Democratic	Dashi Zargani	2,330	25.39	-5.35	$1,309.50
Liberal	Linda Minuk	1,516	16.52	-5.48	$19,553.31
Green	Donald Benham Jr.	491	5.35		$197.89
Total valid votes/expense limit		9,176	99.65	-	$
Total rejected ballots		32	0.35	-0.04	
Turnout		9,208	62.31	+1.78	
Eligible voters		14,778			
Progressive Conservative hold		Swing		+5.41	
Source: Elections Manitoba

2007 Manitoba general election
Party	Candidate	Votes	%	±%	Expenditures
Progressive Conservative	Heather Stefanson	3,982	47.26	-5.56	$23,513.68
New Democratic	Matt Schaubroeck	2,590	30.74	+5.38	$3,675.93
Liberal	Audra Bayer	1,865	22.00	+0.18	$8,901.80
Total valid votes		8,426	99.61		
Total rejected ballots		33	0.39	+0.04	
Turnout		8,459	60.53	+4.22	
Eligible voters		13,975			
Progressive Conservative hold		Swing		-5.47	

2003 Manitoba general election
Party	Candidate	Votes	%	±%	Expenditures
Progressive Conservative	Heather Stefanson	4,213	52.81	−6.79	$32,959.68
New Democratic	Sonia Taylor	2,023	25.36	+10.57	$992.64
Liberal	Marla Billinghurst	1,741	21.83	−3.78	$8,740.56
Total valid votes		7,977	99.59		
Total rejected ballots		33	0.41	+0.17	
Turnout		8,005	56.31	+10.27	
Eligible voters		14,217			
Source: Elections Manitoba

Manitoba provincial by-election, November 21, 2000 Resignation of Gary Filmon
Party	Candidate	Votes	%	±%
Progressive Conservative	Heather Stefanson	3,692	59.61	-1.12
Liberal	Rochelle Zimberg	1,586	25.61	+11.41
New Democratic	Iona Starr	916	14.79	-9.01
Total valid votes		6,194	99.76	
Total rejected ballots		15	0.24	-0.51
Turnout		6,209	46.03	-25.80
Eligible voters		13,488		
Progressive Conservative hold		Swing		-6.27
Source: Elections Manitoba

1999 Manitoba general election
Party	Candidate	Votes	%	±%	Expenditures
Progressive Conservative	Gary Filmon	5,952	60.72	-5.50	$24,905.00
New Democratic	Jack Dubois	2,333	23.80	+12.70	$1,636.00
Liberal	Rochelle Zimberg	1,391	14.19	-8.48	$1,406.60
Green	Markus Buchart	126	1.29		$49.01
Total valid votes/expense limit		9,802	99.25	–	
Total rejected and declined ballots		74	0.75	+0.38	
Turnout		9,876	71.83	-1.27	
Eligible voters		13,749			
Progressive Conservative hold		Swing		-9.10	

1995 Manitoba general election
Party	Candidate	Votes	%	±%
Progressive Conservative	Gary Filmon	8,691	66.23	+1.09
Liberal	Rick Rosenberg	2,975	22.67	-4.52
New Democratic	Martha Owen	1,457	11.10	+3.43
Total valid votes		13,123	99.63	
Total rejected ballots		49	0.37	+0.22
Turnout		13,172	73.10	-2.39
Eligible voters		18,019		
Progressive Conservative hold		Swing		+2.80

1990 Manitoba general election
Party	Candidate	Votes	%	±%
Progressive Conservative	Gary Filmon	7,861	65.14	+17.86
Liberal	Campbell Wright	3,281	27.19	-19.18
New Democratic	Rosemary Ahoff	926	7.67	+2.42
Total valid votes		12,068	99.85	
Total rejected ballots		18	0.15	-0.03
Turnout		12,086	75.50	-4.27
Eligible voters		16,009		
Progressive Conservative hold		Swing		+18.52

1988 Manitoba general election
Party	Candidate	Votes	%	±%
Progressive Conservative	Gary Filmon	6,427	47.28	-1.81
Liberal	Jasper McKee	6,303	46.37	-7.58
New Democratic	Catherine Hofmann	714	5.25	-11.67
Western Independence	Ralph EisBrenner	149	1.10	
Total valid votes		13,593	99.82	
Total rejected ballots		25	0.18	+0.07
Turnout		13,618	79.77	+7.93
Eligible voters		17,072		
Progressive Conservative hold		Swing		-7.58

1986 Manitoba general election
Party	Candidate	Votes	%	±%
Progressive Conservative	Gary Filmon	5,268	49.09	-15.50
Liberal	Jim Carr	3,544	33.02	+20.96
New Democratic	Bill Armstrong	1,816	16.92	-643
Progressive	David Pearlman	104	0.97	
Total valid votes		10,732	99.89	
Total rejected ballots		12	0.11	-0.16
Turnout		10,744	71.84	-2.29
Eligible voters		14,955		
Progressive Conservative hold		Swing		-18.23

1981 Manitoba general election
Party	Candidate	Votes	%
Progressive Conservative	Gary Filmon	6,731	64.59
New Democratic	Terri Gray	2,433	23.35
Liberal	Beverly McCaffery	1,257	12.06
Total valid votes		10,421	99.73
Total rejected ballots		28	0.27
Turnout		10,449	74.13
Eligible voters		14,096	

== Previous boundaries ==
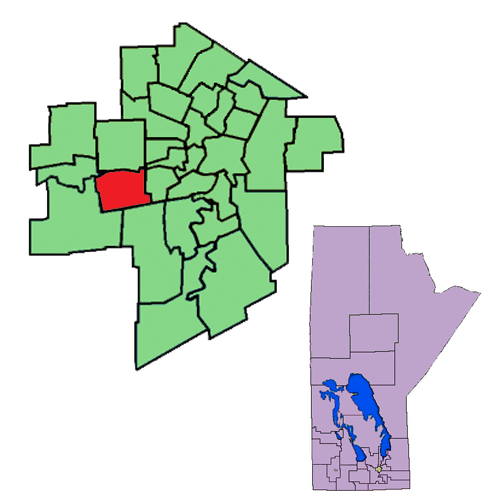
The 1999–2011 boundaries for Tuxedo highlighted in red.

== See also ==
- List of Manitoba provincial electoral districts
- Canadian provincial electoral districts
