= Heather Stefanson =

Premier of Manitoba from 2021 to 2023

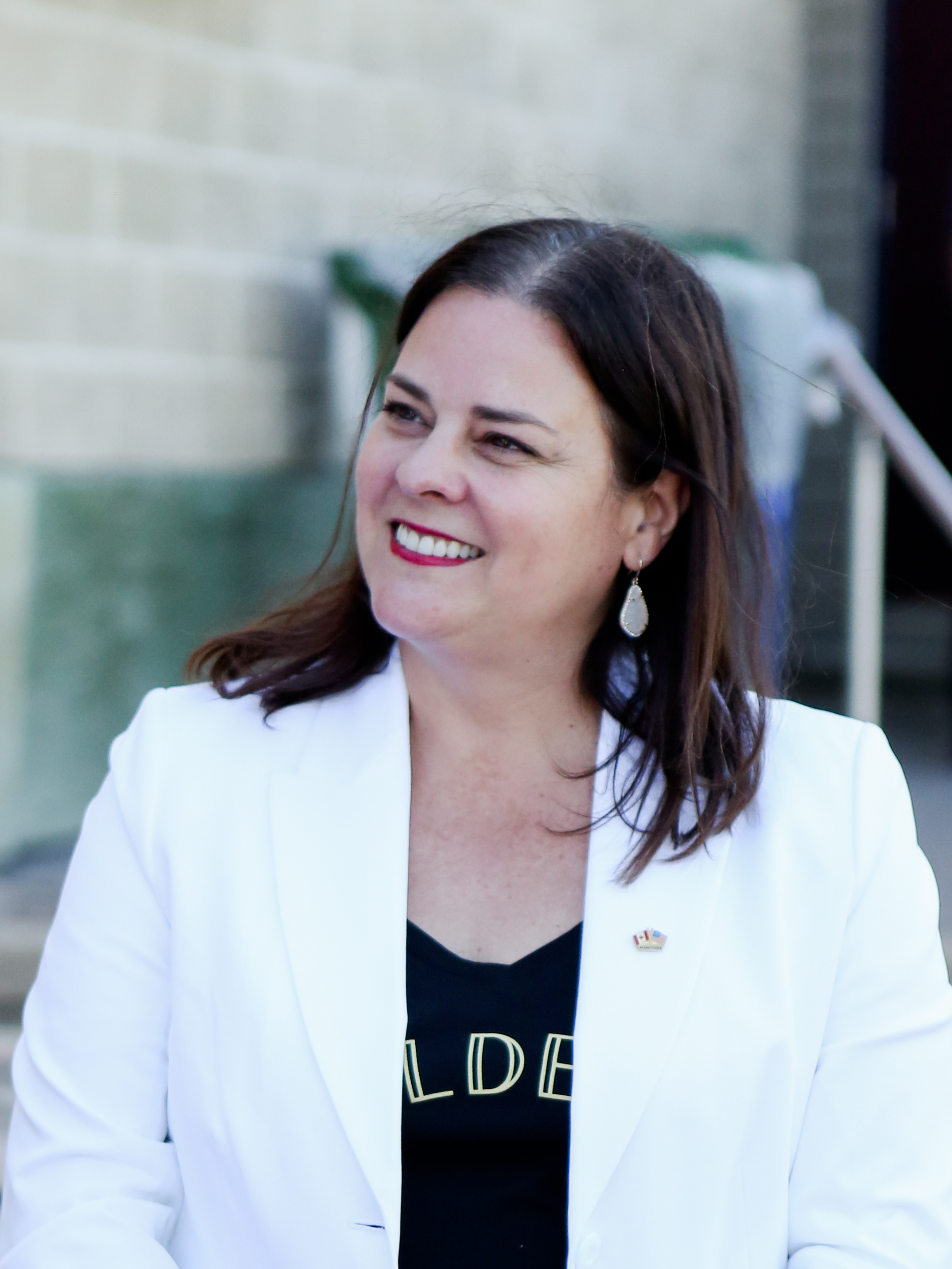
- Stefanson in 2022

24th Premier of Manitoba
- In office 2 November 2021 – 18 October 2023
- Monarchs: Elizabeth II; Charles III
- Lieutenant Governor: Janice Filmon; Anita Neville
- Deputy: Rochelle Squires; Kelvin Goertzen; Cliff Cullen
- Preceded by: Kelvin Goertzen
- Succeeded by: Wab Kinew

Leader of the Opposition in Manitoba
- In office 18 October 2023 – 15 January 2024
- Preceded by: Wab Kinew
- Succeeded by: Wayne Ewasko

Leader of the Progressive Conservative Party of Manitoba
- In office 30 October 2021 – 15 January 2024
- Preceded by: Kelvin Goertzen (interim)
- Succeeded by: Wayne Ewasko (interim)

Minister of Health and Seniors Care
- In office 5 January 2021 – 18 August 2021
- Premier: Brian Pallister
- Preceded by: Cameron Friesen
- Succeeded by: Audrey Gordon

7th Deputy Premier of Manitoba
- In office 3 May 2016 – 5 January 2021
- Premier: Brian Pallister
- Preceded by: Kerri Irvin-Ross
- Succeeded by: Kelvin Goertzen

Minister of Families
- In office 1 August 2018 – 5 January 2021
- Premier: Brian Pallister
- Preceded by: Scott Fielding
- Succeeded by: Rochelle Squires

Minister of Justice Attorney General of Manitoba
- In office 3 May 2016 – 1 August 2018
- Premier: Brian Pallister
- Preceded by: Gord Mackintosh
- Succeeded by: Cliff Cullen

Member of the Legislative Assembly of Manitoba for Tuxedo
- In office 21 November 2000 – 6 May 2024
- Preceded by: Gary Filmon
- Succeeded by: Carla Compton

Personal details
- Born: Heather Dorothy Stefanson; 11 May 1970 (age 56) Winnipeg, Manitoba, Canada
- Party: Progressive Conservative
- Spouse: Jason
- Children: 2
- Education: University of Western Ontario (BA)

Heather Dorothy Stefanson (born 11 May 1970) is a Canadian former politician who served as the 24th premier of Manitoba from 2021 to 2023, the first woman in the province's history to hold the office.

She is the former leader of the Progressive Conservative Party of Manitoba and served as Leader of the Opposition of Manitoba after the 2023 Manitoba election. She was the member of the Legislative Assembly (MLA) for the electoral district of Tuxedo until 6 May 2024.

== Early life and career ==
Stefanson was born on 11 May 1970, in Winnipeg, Manitoba. She was raised in Winnipeg, where she attended St. John's-Ravenscourt School. She received a Bachelor of Arts in political science from the University of Western Ontario.

After receiving her degree, Stefanson worked as a special assistant in the Office of the Prime Minister under Brian Mulroney before returning to Manitoba in 1993 as an assistant to federal Agriculture Minister Charlie Mayer.

From 1995 to 2000, Stefanson was a member of the University of Manitoba's Young Associates organization. From 1998 to 2000, Stenson volunteered on Premier Gary Filmon's Executive in Tuxedo.

In 1999, Stefanson was suspended for seven months by the Manitoba District Council of the Investment Dealers Association of Canada for failing to meet educational requirements. Stefanson was found to have made 34 inappropriate trades while she was working as an investment adviser at Wellington West Capital. In 2003, Wellington West Capital was fined $13,000 for failing to supervise the activities of Stefanson. She had been suspended from acting in the capacity of a registered representative but had issued statements to clients indicating her employment as a registered representative during this suspension.

== Political career ==
Stefanson was first elected to the Manitoba legislature in a 2000 by-election, replacing former Progressive Conservative Premier Gary Filmon in the south Winnipeg riding of Tuxedo. Stefanson was easily re-elected in the 2003 election, with the NDP improving to a second-place status, followed by her re-election in the 2007, 2011, 2016, and 2019 elections.

In 2002, she received the Queen Elizabeth II Golden Jubilee Medal in recognition of her community service.

In 2016, Premier Brian Pallister named Stefanson deputy premier and the Minister of Justice and Attorney General. In 2018, she became the Minister of Families in addition to her role as deputy premier. In 2021, she took over the health portfolio; health minister Kelvin Goertzen became deputy premier.

On 2 November 2021, Stefanson became the first female Premier of Manitoba following a majority vote of the Progressive Conservative caucus.

=== MLA for Tuxedo ===
Stefanson was first elected to the Manitoba legislature in a 2000 by-election, replacing former Progressive Conservative Premier Gary Filmon in the south Winnipeg riding of Tuxedo. Stefanson defeated Liberal Rochelle Zimberg by 2,692 votes to 1,586; Iona Starr, representing the governing New Democratic Party (NDP), finished third.

As MLA for Tuxedo, Stefanson has been an advocate for Special Olympics Manitoba, an organization dedicated to enriching the lives of people with intellectual disabilities through sport. In 2013, she introduced The Special Olympics Awareness Week Act in the Manitoba Legislative Assembly, designating the second week of June each year as Special Olympics Awareness Week in Manitoba. The Act received unanimous support from the Manitoba Legislative Assembly. Stefanson also continues to serve as an honorary board member for Special Olympics Manitoba.

Stefanson has announced several investments in the Assiniboine Park located in her Tuxedo constituency. In 2017, when Stefanson was serving as Deputy Premier, she announced $15-million for the Assiniboine Park Conservancy's new Diversity Gardens project, the final phase of the Conservancy's 10-year, $200 million development plan. As Premier in 2022, Stefanson announced $2 million to support a $15-million capital campaign to build the new Toba Centre for Children & Youth at 710 Assiniboine Park Drive. The Toba Centre provides support to child abuse victims, including forensic interviews.

Stefanson has maintained strong ties with the Jewish community throughout her time as MLA. In 2016, she condemned rising anti-Semitism and praised the Tuxedo Jewish community. In 2019, she joined Winnipeg Mayor Brian Bowman in requesting that the Social Planning Council of Winnipeg disinvite controversial American activist Linda Sarsour from speaking at an event, citing the speaker's alleged anti-Semitic comments.

=== Minister of Justice and Attorney General ===
Stefanson was sworn in as Minister of Justice and Attorney General in a ceremony at the Canadian Museum of Human Rights in 2016, becoming only the second woman to hold that position since 1871. She was also appointed Deputy Premier and Keeper of the Great Seal of the province of Manitoba.

==== Criminal justice system reform ====
In response to a 2016 report by the Macdonald–Laurier Institute that ranked Manitoba's criminal justice system as the worst in the country, Stefanson committed to a full review of the criminal justice system. The review showed that Manitoba had the highest adult incarceration rate among provinces, along with high violent crime and recidivism rates. The review also found significant delay in criminal matters moving through Manitoba's court system. To respond to the review, Stefanson released Manitoba's Criminal Justice System Modernization Strategy in March 2018. The plan included four essential components, including crime prevention; focusing resources on the most serious criminal cases; more effectively using restorative justice; and responsibly reintegrating offenders back into society. In 2019, Stefanson's successor as Minister of Justice announced that the strategy had resulted in significant reductions in time to disposition in Manitoba's provincial court and Court of Queen's Bench as well as a reduction in provincial custody counts.

In 2017, Stefanson collaborated with the Chief Justices of Manitoba's provincial court, Court of Queen's Bench, and Court of Appeal to request that the federal government change the Criminal Code to eliminate preliminary inquiries in the province. The letter proposed a four-year pilot project where preliminary inquiries would be eliminated for indictable offences carrying a sentence less than ten years, and replaced with an out-of-court discovery process for offences carrying a sentence over ten years. The goal of the proposed project was to reduce unreasonable court delays. It responded to the Supreme Court of Canada's decision in R v Jordan, which set time limits on criminal proceedings that could result in people accused of serious crimes, including murder, walking free due to unreasonable court delay. The federal government responded to calls for preliminary inquiry reform in 2018 with the introduction and passage of Bill C-75. The Bill restricts preliminary inquiries to only offences carrying a maximum sentence of 14 years or more. University of Ottawa law professor Allan Rock estimated the legislation would produce an 87 percent reduction in preliminary inquiries and help reduce court delay significantly. In a statement regarding the federal, provincial and territorial Justice Ministers meeting in April 2017, Stefanson expressed her support for mandatory minimum sentences for certain criminal offences. She stated, "anything less than a prison sentence for certain crimes is unjustifiable in Manitoba's view."

In October 2017, Stefanson established a committee of experts in family law to make recommendations on how to make the system more accessible and less adversarial for couples going through separation and divorce. In June 2018, Stefanson announced the committee's recommendations, which included establishing a three-year pilot project in Winnipeg to direct Winnipeg-based family matters to non-adversarial mediation outside of court; creating an administrative office to triage and find more appropriate ways to resolve disputes; and expanding information available to Manitobans about family law related issues. In March 2019, Stefanson's successor as Minister of Justice introduced The Family Law Modernization Act based on the findings of the committee. The law included changes that would allow separating couples to resolve child custody, support, and property matters without going to court. The provincial government eventually launched a Family Resolution Service to resolve matters earlier and outside the tradition court process.The government estimated the new service would save Manitoba families up to $41 million in court and legal fees.

In March 2018, Stefanson introduced legislation reinstating the Queen's Counsel designation for Manitoba lawyers who have served for at least ten years and have demonstrated outstanding practice as a lawyer among other contributions. In October 2018, Stefanson's predecessor issued the first call for nominations for Queen's Counsel appointments. In June 2019, the Minister of Justice made the first Queen's Counsel appointments since the practice ended under the former NDP government in 2001.

==== Cannabis legalization ====
To prepare for the planned federal legalization of cannabis, Stefanson introduced The Cannabis Harm Prevention Act in March 2017. The Act created new cannabis-related driving offences that anticipated the eventual legalization of the drug, including granting police the ability to issue 24-hour driver's license suspensions if they believe a driver is under the influence of a drug or unable to safely operate a motor vehicle. In response to questions about the 2017 "420" protest on the Manitoba Legislature grounds, Stefanson stressed her concerns about the impact of cannabis on young people, saying of the protest "it does disturb me how many young people were out there today."

In December 2017, Stefanson introduced The Safe and Responsible Retailing of Cannabis Act, which established the framework for the regulation of cannabis retail sales in Manitoba. The Act established a private retail model, with retail licenses obtained from the newly renamed Liquor, Gaming and Cannabis Authority. It required that all retailers source their cannabis supply from Manitoba Liquor and Lotteries. The Act also established 19 as the legal age to purchase cannabis in Manitoba, a decision endorsed by the Manitoba School Boards Association, as it would help keep cannabis out of schools and playgrounds.

Despite federal legislation allowing Canadian adults to grow up to four cannabis plants at home, the Safe and Responsible Retailing of Cannabis Act prohibited individuals from home cultivation of cannabis. Manitoba and Quebec are the only provinces to prohibit home cultivation of cannabis. Stefanson defended the home grow prohibition as a means of keeping cannabis away from children and preventing diversion of supply into the black market. The Canadian Association of Chiefs of Police had joined Stefanson and other Justice Ministers in calling for a national prohibition of home cultivation in April 2017. Cannabis advocates have since challenged both the Manitoba and Quebec home cultivation prohibitions in court as unconstitutional.

In March 2018, Stefanson announced The Impaired Driving Offences Act, which updated drug impaired driving provisions to complement pending federal legislation. Included in the Act were new administrative driver's license suspensions for impaired driving. She was joined by the Minister of Health, Seniors and Active Living who announced a provincial prohibition on smoking cannabis in outdoor public places.

==== Family law reform ====
In October 2017, Stefanson established a committee of experts in family law to make recommendations on how to make the system more accessible and less adversarial for couples going through separation and divorce. In June 2018, Stefanson announced the committee's recommendations, which included establishing a three-year pilot project in Winnipeg to direct Winnipeg-based family matters to non-adversarial mediation outside of court; creating an administrative office to triage and find more appropriate ways to resolve disputes; and expanding information available to Manitobans about family law related issues.

In March 2019, Stefanson's successor as Minister of Justice introduced The Family Law Modernization Act based on the findings of the committee. The law included changes that would allow separating couples to resolve child custody, support, and property matters without going to court. The provincial government eventually launched a Family Resolution Service to resolve matters earlier and outside the traditional court process. The government estimated the new service would save Manitoba families up to $41 million in court and legal fees.

==== Queen's Counsel Act ====
In March 2018, Stefanson introduced legislation reinstating the Queen's Counsel designation for Manitoba lawyers who have served for at least 10 years and have demonstrated outstanding practice as a lawyer among other contributions. In October 2018, Stefanson's predecessor issued the first call for nominations for Queen's Counsel appointments. In June 2019, the Minister of Justice made the first Queen's Counsel appointments since the practice ended under the former NDP government in 2001.

=== Minister of Families ===
Stefanson was sworn in as Minister of Families in a ceremony at the Manitoba Legislature on 1 August 2018. She also retained her position as Deputy Premier.

==== Child and family services ====
In September 2018, Stefanson reported the first reduction in the number of children in Child and Family Services (CFS) care in 15 years, with a nine percent decrease in child apprehensions and an eight percent increase in family reunifications. Stefanson credited the government's emphasis on preventative measures as helping at-risk families avoid contact with the child welfare system. The number of children in CFS care decreased each year Stefanson was Minister of Families.

Stefanson made several changes to Manitoba's CFS system meant to reduce the number of children in care. In February 2019, she announced a new block funding or "single envelope" funding model for CFS authorities, which are responsible for child welfare agencies in various regions of the province. The new model ended the per-child funding model where CFS agencies would receive funding based on the number of children in care and the number of days they are in care, which the government said incentivized child apprehensions.

In January 2020, Stefanson announced that the province would end the controversial practice of birth alerts, where CFS agencies warn hospitals about the history of a pregnant mother considered "high risk." Indigenous leadership had called for an end to the practice. Manitoba Keewatinowi Okimakanak Grand Chief Garrison Settee expressed excitement at the news, telling media "we applaud the province for listening to us." In June 2020, Stefanson announced the official end of birth alerts along with an investment of $400,000 to double the capacity of the Mothering Project, a program to support vulnerable mothers and their children operated by Mount Carmel Clinic. Stefanson had previously invested $400,000 to launch Granny's House, a two-story home in North Point Douglas that provides short-term respite for parents otherwise at-risk of CFS contact.

==== Housing ====
In June 2019, Stefanson signed onto the National Housing Strategy with the federal government. The 10-year agreement with the federal government promised to invest almost $450.8 million to expand and repair social and community housing in the province. The strategy was cost shared by both levels of government, with Manitoba contributing $225.4 million to the agreement.

In January 2020, Stefanson released Shared Priorities – Sustainable Progress: A 12-Month Action Plan for Manitoba Families. The action plan included a commitment to increase private and community-based delivery of social housing while repairing existing housing stock. Housing advocates criticised the plan as a cost cutting measure. In July 2020, Stefanson announced a $31 million investment in repairs to Manitoba Housing properties, estimated to make over 800 otherwise vacant units ready for new tenants.

Stefanson announced several home ownership programs throughout her time as Minister of Families. In August 2020, she announced a $3 million for Habitat for Humanity to support its home building program over three years. She later announced $2 million to provide down payment assistance to first-time homebuyers and help build houses for First Nations families through a partnership between the Assembly of Manitoba Chiefs and the Manitoba Real Estate Association.

==== COVID-19 pandemic response ====
Stefanson was Minister of Families during most of the first year of the global COVID-19 pandemic. The pandemic required significant changes to the delivery of social services provided by her department, including childcare, CFS, homelessness, and disability services.

The Manitoba government announced the closure of childcare centres on 17 March 2020, in response to the COVID-19 pandemic. Two days later, Stefanson announced $27.6 million in support to help childcare centres serve the children of frontline workers, including an $18 million grant program administered by the Winnipeg Chamber of Commerce and Manitoba Chambers of Commerce to help early childhood educators offer childcare services at home or in the community. In August 2020, Stefanson announced the government would repurpose some of the funds as part of a $22 million investment intended to expand choices in childcare.

For children in the Manitoba CFS system, Stefanson extended supports and services to all young adults who would otherwise age out of the system during the pandemic. Stefanson also announced a partnership with telecommunications firm TELUS to support children in CFS, with the donating 120 tablets with data plans to the province. Emergency placement shelters operated by Winnipeg Child and Family Services received the majority of the tablets, helping children reconnect with family, friends, teachers, and other supports.

To reduce the spread of COVID-19 among Manitoba's homelessness population, Stefanson announced $1.2 million to add 140 shelter beds by repurposing a vacant Manitoba Housing building and expanding capacity at the Salvation Army and Siloam Mission shelters. She extended funding for homeless shelters again in June and September, including by expanding available space at the Main Street Project shelter in Winnipeg.

To help low-income Manitobans with disabilities, Stefanson joined Premier Brian Pallister to announce $4.6 million for the Disability Economic Support Program. The program provided a $200 one-time cheque to 23,000 Manitobans receiving Employment and Income Assistance benefits under the disability category. Stefanson also announced measures to improve staffing in disability services agencies, including $6 million to help with overtime costs, replacement staff, and sick leave as part of a broader $10 million Pandemic Staffing Support Benefit. She later announced a one-time $5 wage top up for workers in the disability services and other critical frontline positions as part of the $35 million Caregiver Wage Support Program. Stefanson also announced a partnership with Manitoba Possible and Red River College to increase staffing in disability services agencies during the pandemic.

In June 2020, Stefanson announced $2.5 million for a Home Nutrition and Learning Program pilot project. The province worked with community organizations to 2,500 families with packages of healthy foods, including recipes and learning activities developed by the Child Nutrition Council of Manitoba.

=== Minister of Health and Seniors Care ===
Stefanson was sworn in as Minister of Health and Seniors Care in a ceremony at the Manitoba Legislature on 5 January 2021. She did not retain the Deputy Premier role, which the premier awarded to Kelvin Goertzen, the Minister of Legislative and Public Affairs. Stefanson identified the COVID-19 vaccine rollout as a significant priority in interviews following her appointment as Minister of Health and Seniors Care.

==== Dr. Lynn Stevenson Long-Term Care Review ====
In February 2021, Stefanson announced that the Manitoba government would implement all recommendations of Dr. Lynn Stevenson's review of long-term care. The review examined the COVID-19 outbreak at the Maples Long Term Care facility that resulted in 56 deaths. As Premier, Stefanson later announced $15 million to implement the Stevenson review recommendations, which included enhancing infection prevention and control, hiring 200 full-time housekeeping staff, and improving information technology to better support patient care.

==== Budget 2021 investments ====
In April 2021, Stefanson joined Minister of Finance Scott Fielding to announce $1.2 billion for the COVID-19 pandemic response. The funding included $350 million for additional health system costs to prepare for a third wave of COVID-19 and $100 million for a vaccine program across the province. Moreover, $300 million was set aside as COVID-19 contingency for unbudgeted expenses. The budget also included $50 million to address the backlog in surgeries and diagnostic tests that had accumulated during the pandemic.

Budget 2021 included $6.98 billion for health care, an increase of $156 million from the previous year. New health care investments included $23 million for cancer treatments, $2.7 million to expand dialysis treatment, and $9.3 million to expand personal care homes in the municipalities of Steinbach and Carman.

==== COVID-19 third wave ====
During Manitoba's third-wave of COVID-19, Stefanson claimed on 18 May 2021, that Manitoba's health system could handle an additional 50 patients in the ICU for a total of 170. However, later that day, she announced ICU beds were at capacity and two patients had been sent to Thunder Bay for treatment. Shared Health had been aware that the healthcare system was unable to handle 170 patients, and on 7 May, chief nursing officer Lanette Siragusa called a previous exercise showing capacity at 173 ICU beds a "paper exercise" that "did not reflect the reality of Manitoba's capacity."

On 13 May, Shared Health CEO Adam Topp attended a meeting regarding Thunder Bay Regional Health Sciences Centre and ICU capacity. However, Stefanson claims she was not aware of this meeting, and didn't know about the out-of-province transfer until after the decision was made. In total, Manitoba transferred 57 COVID-19 patients out of the province during the third wave, 12 of whom died while being treated out of province.

One of the individuals who died was 31-year-old Krystal Mousseau, a mother of two from Ebb and Flow First Nation in Manitoba. Her death prompted criticism from Wab Kinew, the Leader of the Opposition, who questioned whether Mousseau had been appropriately cleared for medical transport. Dr. John Younes, Manitoba's Chief Medical Examiner, declined to call an inquest into the death. On 1 March 2021, Younes wrote to Kinew stating that a "carefully considered medical decision was made to move patients out of province to make room for incoming patients who would otherwise not survive." He added that it is not the role of an inquest to "second guess complex medical decisions, particularly those made under horrific circumstances." Kinew later requested that the Premier to call an inquiry into the death.

==== Vaccine rollout ====
In January 2021, Stefanson announced a four-stage immunization plan that outlined a strategy to expand Manitoba's immunization campaign to priority groups and then to all Manitobans based on age. The plan was based on guidelines developed by the National Advisory Committee on Immunization and was informed by 27 physicians on Manitoba's vaccine medical advisory table. Stefanson was criticised for a slow rollout of the vaccine, which she attributed to a lack of supply from the federal government. On 5 May 2021, Stefanson announced that the province had administered 500,000 doses of the COVID-19 vaccine. Ten days later, she reported that 50 percent of all Manitoba adults had received at least one dose of the vaccine.

The #ProtectMB COVID-19 Immunization Plan included setting up vaccine clinics in several areas, including supersites, focussed immunization teams, and pop-up community clinics. By April 2022, 1.1 million Manitobans were fully vaccinated representing 82 per cent of those eligible.

==== Medical leave ====
On 21 May 2021, the province announced Stefanson would be taking a medical leave to undergo a necessary procedure recommended by her physician. Kelvin Goertzen acted as interim Health Minister in her absence. Stefanson resumed her duties virtually in late June and gave her first in-person interview with media on 8 July 2021. She did not provide details as to the nature of her medical procedure. She later told media she had undergone a hysterectomy on the recommendation of her doctor after putting it off for more than a year.

== 2021 Manitoba Progressive Conservative leadership election ==
After Pallister announced his impending retirement, Stefanson announced that she would run in the 2021 Progressive Conservative Party of Manitoba leadership election. She was the first PC party member to announce their candidacy in the election, and had the support of two thirds of the PC caucus. Stefanson ran prominently on a pledge to scrap Bill 64, Pallister's unpopular education reform legislation.

Pallister resigned on 1 September, and Kelvin Goertzen took over as premier pending the election of his successor. Stefanson garnered strong support from Manitoba's business community. On 24 September 2021, her campaign published an endorsement letter signed by seven prominent businesspeople who expressed concerns about the anti-vaccine sentiments of her opponent, Shelly Glover.

Stefanson narrowly won the race with 363 votes over her opponent. On 21 March, Stefanson released her leadership campaign financials revealing that she raised $576,625 in campaign donations, $360,000 of that money came from 120 individuals who donated the maximum amount of $3,000. Stefanson received donations from several prominent businesspeople, including Winnipeg Jets executive chairman Mark Chipman, Richardson Financial Group CEO Sandy Riley, and Buhler Industries founder John Buhler.

On 14 May 2022, Stefanson was cautioned for having illegally spent $1,800 in campaign funds prior to the electoral period beginning.

== Premier of Manitoba ==
Stefanson was sworn in as Manitoba's first female premier on 2 November 2021. Her swearing-in speech outlined her top priorities as advancing reconciliation with Indigenous peoples, addressing surgical and diagnostic backlogs, rebuilding the economy, improving education, and focusing on labour shortages in the economy. She also promised to create a task force to tackle the backlog in surgeries and diagnostic tests.

Stefanson is credited with dramatically improving relationships with other levels of government, which federal officials and Winnipeg Mayor Brian Bowman have remarked to media. This comes as Stefanson has continued to work with other First Minister's to pressure the federal government to restore its share of the Canada Health Transfer.

=== 2021 Throne Speech and cabinet shuffle ===
Following Stefanson's swearing in as Premier, she announced her intention to begin a new legislative session with a Speech from the Throne on 23 November 2021. She also announced a new senior leadership team, including a new Chief of Staff.

Lieutenant-Governor Janice Filmon read the Speech from the Throne, which was branded as Manitoba's "Path to Progressing Together." The Speech outlined Stefanson's vision for a "strong economic and social recovery, with a focus on the health and wellbeing of all Manitobans." Loren Remillard, president and CEO of the Winnipeg Chamber of Commerce, praised the speech and said that it demonstrated that Stefanson's priorities were aligned with those of the business community. Remillard praised Stefanson again when she delivered the annual State of the Province address just over a week later.

Stefanson shuffled her cabinet on 18 January 2022. The shuffle added three new MLAs to prominent cabinet positions. It also split the health care portfolio into three positions – the Minister of Health, the Minister of Mental Health and Community Wellness, and the Minister of Seniors and Long-term Care. She also appointed a Minister of Labour, a move endorsed by the Manitoba Federation of Labour as "long past due." University of Manitoba political studies professor Royce Koop praised the shuffle as sound political strategy.

Stefanson established a new Economic Development Board of Cabinet on 22 February 2022, to co-ordinate economic growth and job creation initiatives in Manitoba.

=== COVID-19 pandemic ===
Stefanson acted in response to the COVID-19 Omicron variant, only after annual Christmas celebrations. Stefanson announced public health orders to combat the Omicron variant on 27 December 2021. On 12 January 2022, Stefanson responded to questions about making public health orders more stringent by saying that "we must all learn to live with this virus; there must be a balance."

On 2 February 2022, she announced the first phase in a plan to loosen public health restrictions and later announced a date when all public health orders would end in Manitoba. Manitoba ended all public health orders on 15 March 2022.

Stefanson required her cabinet and caucus to be vaccinated against COVID-19, imposing a deadline for them to meet immunization requirements. She later removed Infrastructure Minister Ron Schuler from cabinet due his refusal to disclose his vaccination status, a decision she characterized as inconsistent with the government's efforts to promote vaccination. Stefanson later removed Tory MLA Josh Guenter from his role as Legislative Assistant to the Minister of Health for his continued disagreement with the government over COVID-19 vaccine mandates.

Stefanson's Minister of Health announced the establishment of a Diagnostic and Surgical Recovery Task Force on 8 December 2021, to address the backlogs created by the COVID-19 pandemic response.

=== 2022 budget ===
Stefanson's Minister of Finance tabled the 2022 Manitoba Budget on 12 April 2022. The Budget, which was branded Recover Together, focused on five priorities – strengthening health care, making life more affordable, building the economy, investing in communities, and protecting the environment.

The 2022 Budget increased the Education Property Tax Rebate to 37.5 per cent. The tax cut was projected to save Manitobans $350 million in 2022. The Budget also promised to increase the rebate again in 2023, saving the average homeowner $1,355 over two years. The 2022 Budget Speech stated that cumulative tax changes since the Progressive Conservatives formed government in 2016 put $2,400 "back in the pockets" of the average Manitoban.

The 2022 Budget included $50 million for a new Venture Capital Fund to assist Manitoba companies with start-up costs. The measure was praised by prominent members of the province's business community, including representatives from the Manitoba Chambers of Commerce and the Business Council of Manitoba.

The 2022 Budget included $110 million for the Diagnostic and Surgical Recovery Task Force and $32 million to improve long-term care for seniors. The overall health care budget was $7.2 billion, the largest health care investment in the province's history at the time.

=== Affordability measures ===
On 31 August 2022, Stefanson announced a Family Affordability Package that included $87 million in measures to offset the rising cost of living for Manitobans. The package included an announcement that Manitoba families with children and a household income of less than $175,000 would receive a benefit cheque of $250 for their first child and $200 for each subsequent child, helping an estimated 145,000 families. Moreover, low-income seniors with less than $40,000 in family income who claimed an Education Property Tax Credit in 2021 would receive a $300 cheque to help with rising costs.

As part of the Family Affordability Package, Stefanson also announced the first increase in the basic needs rate for Employment and Income Assistance clients in 20 years, providing EIA general assistance clients without dependent children an extra $50 per month. The announcement was praised by the CEO of Manitoba Harvest, a large food bank in the province.

=== Criticism ===
Over her premiership, polling data has consistently suggested Stefanson to be the most unpopular premier in Canada.

On 27 January 2022, Stefanson admitted to breaking conflict of interest rules when she failed to disclose over $31 million in property sales. As an MLA, Stefanson had listed these properties among her assets, but then stopped when the properties sold and she did not file the required paperwork, but had met with the conflict of interest commissioner.

On 15 March, Stefanson received widespread criticism for responding to a question from Wab Kinew, the Leader of the Opposition, about Krystal Mousseau, an ICU patient who died during a failed transfer to a hospital out of Manitoba, for responding by talking about her son's performance at a hockey game. Two days later, Stefanson issued a brief written apology. Kinew had been calling for an inquiry into circumstances of the death citing a letter from the regional health authority released a letter explaining that the transfer team was lacking critical monitoring equipment and training. Additionally, the patient was being given medication at the wrong rate. Dr. John Younes, Manitoba's Chief Medical Examiner, declined to call an inquest into the death. On 1 March 2021, Younes wrote to Kinew stating that a "carefully considered medical decision was made to move patients out of province to make room for incoming patients who would otherwise not survive." He added that it is not the role of an inquest to "second guess complex medical decisions, particularly those made under horrific circumstances." Kinew was later criticised for exploiting Mousseau's death for political gain.

On 9 June 2022, Pride Winnipeg criticised Stefanson for using Pride as a photo-op when she did not march in the parade despite having promised to do so. When questioned, Stefanson blamed this on "scheduling conflicts" and miscommunication from her staff. The previous Premier, Brian Pallister, similarly broke his promise to march in the parade after giving a speech; as a result, Pride Winnipeg implemented a policy that invited speakers must also march in the parade. Pride Winnipeg subsequently stated that they would not be extending an invitation to Stefanson to speak at any 2023 Pride events. Stefanson ultimately announced annual grants of $250,000 for Winnipeg Pride, and would take part in the 2023 event by walking in the parade.

On Tuesday, 18 October 2022, concerns were raised when it was discovered that Stefanson had used an undisclosed secret email for government communication. In a freedom of information request, it was revealed that on 11 February, Stefanson privately pleaded for help from the federal government amidst border blockades, asking for "immediate and effective" action and "national leadership that only you and the federal government can provide." A few days later, Stefanson would publicly claim that the situation was under control, and called on the government to refrain from using the Emergencies Act.

In February 2023, Stefanson ended an online school that was launched in January 2021 to provide a remote learning option for grades K-8 during the height of the pandemic, the only K-8 remote learning option at the time. The Manitoba Remote Learning Support Center was ended as the provincial government stated that it was never intended to be a permanent fixture. Despite several phone calls and emails of concern over the closure, enrolment in the remote learning centre was shown to have decreased by 85% since its launch in 2021—serving a student population of 1,050 in the 2020/21 school year, to near 200 by 2023.

In the 2023 election, her party opposed searching the Prairie Green Landfill for the remains of some of the victims of the 2022 Winnipeg serial killings; Stefanson later apologized for running ads highlighting her party's commitment to not search the landfill. The remains of Morgan Harris and Marcedes Myran were found on 26 February 2025, at the landfill. Harris and Myran were respectively identified by police on 7–17 March 2025.

=== Defeat ===
Stefanson led the PCs into the 2023 Manitoba general election. During the previous legislature, the rival opposition Manitoba NDP had gained a polling lead over the PCs. However, the lead had tightened during the campaign period. She primarily campaigned on reducing the cost of living for Manitoba families and businesses. At the election, the PCs were heavily defeated by the NDP. Following her party's defeat, Stefanson announced she would step down as the leader of the Progressive Conservatives. She narrowly held on to her own seat, and was one of only three PCs left in the capital. In April 2024, she announced that she would resign from her seat and retire from politics, triggering the 2024 Tuxedo by-election, which was won by the NDP, the first time the PCs did not win the constituency since its creation in 1981.

=== Second Ethics Violation ===
In the weeks following the 2023 Manitoba general election, Stefanson, along with multiple other PC MLAs became the subject of an Ethics Investigation relating to a violation of the Caretaker Convention. The investigation was over the attempt to approve a Project License for a Sio Silica Sand Mining Project without the legal authority to do so. On 21 May 2025, the Ethics Commissioner found that by attempting to have the Project License issued in the transition period without the consent of the incoming NDP government, Ms. Stefanson contravened the caretaker convention and thereby acted improperly. Stefanson was fined a record amount by the legislative assembly. Ethics Commissioner Jeff Schnoor said in his report that "A breach of the caretaker convention is a serious matter. It is an affront to the basic democratic principle that a government must have the confidence of the Legislative Assembly and of the electorate when it acts. The caretaker convention stands at the very core of our democracy. The legitimacy of a government depends on the support of the electorate, expressed in elections.... The efforts to have the Project license approved by Ms. Stefanson, Mr. Cullen and Mr. Wharton were taken despite their knowledge that voters had rejected the former government and had placed their trust in a new government. In considering my recommendations as to penalty, I find that as head of government, Ms.Stefanson should bear greater responsibility." No investigation occurred into the any financial interest Stefansson may have had in Sio Silica.

The new NDP government rejected Sio Silica's mining project in February 2024 citing significant risk to the health of Lake Winnipeg and clean drinking water for the city of Winnipeg. The decision was based on information and data provided by experts, including a report done by the Clean Environment Commission as well as consultation with impacted communities and First Nations, the province said in a news release.

== Electoral results ==
2023 Manitoba general election: Tuxedo
Party	Candidate	Votes	%	±%	Expenditures
Progressive Conservative	Heather Stefanson	3,968	40.21	-7.65	$10,145.15
New Democratic	Larissa Ashdown	3,700	37.49	+17.70	$1,572.48
Liberal	Marc Brandson	2,201	22.30	-1.26	$5,309.68
Total valid votes/expense limit		9,869	99.60	–	$64,529.00
Total rejected and declined ballots		40	0.40	-0.40	
Turnout		9,909	59.86	+1.96	
Eligible voters		16,554			
Progressive Conservative hold		Swing		-12.67	
Source(s) Source: Elections Manitoba

2019 Manitoba general election: Tuxedo
Party	Candidate	Votes	%	±%	Expenditures
Progressive Conservative	Heather Stefanson	4,645	47.85	-5.2	$21,522.01
Liberal	Marc Brandson	2,287	23.56	+5.0	$4,961.95
New Democratic	Carla Compton	1,921	19.79	+5.5	$614.25
Green	Kristin Lauhn-Jensen	793	8.17	-5.8	$0.00
Manitoba First	Abby Al-Sahi	61	0.63	New	$2,520.94
Total valid votes		9,707	99.19		
Total rejected ballots		79	0.81		
Turnout		9,786	57.90		
Eligible voters		16,903			
Progressive Conservative hold		Swing		-5.1	

2016 Manitoba general election: Tuxedo
Party	Candidate	Votes	%	±%	Expenditures
Progressive Conservative	Heather Stefanson	4,986	58.49	+5.75	$24,812.05
New Democratic	Zachary Fleisher	1,312	15.39	-10.00	$1,259.50
Liberal	Micheal Lazar	1,251	14.67	-1.85	$3,715.32
Green	Bob Krul	976	11.45	+6.10	$0.00
Total valid votes/expense limit		8,525	98.52	-	$45,940.00
Total rejected and declined ballots		128	1.48	+1.13	
Turnout		8,653	62.39	+0.08	
Eligible voters		13,869			
Progressive Conservative hold		Swing		+7.88	
Source: Elections Manitoba

2011 Manitoba general election: Tuxedo
Party	Candidate	Votes	%	±%	Expenditures
Progressive Conservative	Heather Stefanson	4,839	52.74	+5.48	$27,442.42
New Democratic	Dashi Zargani	2,330	25.39	-5.35	$1,309.50
Liberal	Linda Minuk	1,516	16.52	-5.48	$19,553.31
Green	Donald Benham Jr.	491	5.35		$197.89
Total valid votes/expense limit		9,176	99.65	-	$
Total rejected ballots		32	0.35	-0.04	
Turnout		9,208	62.31	+1.78	
Eligible voters		14,778			
Progressive Conservative hold		Swing		+5.41	
Source: Elections Manitoba

2007 Manitoba general election: Tuxedo
Party	Candidate	Votes	%	±%	Expenditures
Progressive Conservative	Heather Stefanson	3,982	47.26	-5.56	$23,513.68
New Democratic	Matt Schaubroeck	2,590	30.74	+5.38	$3,675.93
Liberal	Audra Bayer	1,865	22.00	+0.18	$8,901.80
Total valid votes		8,426	99.61		
Total rejected ballots		33	0.39	+0.04	
Turnout		8,459	60.53	+4.22	
Eligible voters		13,975			
Progressive Conservative hold		Swing		-5.47	

2003 Manitoba general election: Tuxedo
Party	Candidate	Votes	%	±%	Expenditures
Progressive Conservative	Heather Stefanson	4,213	52.81	−7.91	$32,959.68
New Democratic	Sonia Taylor	2,023	25.36	+1.56	$992.64
Liberal	Marla Billinghurst	1,741	21.83	−14.10	$8,740.56
Total valid votes		7,977	100.0		
Total rejected ballots		–	–	–	
Source: Elections Manitoba

Manitoba provincial by-election, 21 November 2000: Tuxedo Resignation of Gary Filmon
Party	Candidate	Votes	%	±%
Progressive Conservative	Heather Stefanson	3,692	59.46	-1.26
Liberal	Rochelle Zimberg	1,586	25.54	+11.35
New Democratic	Iona Starr	916	14.75	-9.05
Total valid votes		6,194		
Total rejected ballots		15		
Turnout		6,209	46.03	
Eligible voters		13,488		
Progressive Conservative hold		Swing		
Source: Elections Manitoba
