= The Everlasting Road =

2023 novel by Wab Kinew

- Author: Wab Kinew
- Language: English
- Genre: Science Fiction, Indigenous futurism, Children's literature
- Publisher: Tundra Books
- Pages: 272
- ISBN: 9780735269033

The Everlasting Road is the sequel to Anishinaabe writer Wab Kinew's Walking in Two Worlds. The title alludes to the traditional Anishinaabe concept of Gaagigewekinaa, the road which is walked by souls in the afterlife.

== Summary ==
The story picks up directly from Walking in Two Worlds, which ends with the teenage heroes Bugz and Feng consolidating their romantic relationship, and the death of Bugz's beloved elder brother Waawaate from cancer. Key plot threads in the sequel are: Feng dealing with the news that his parents, estranged from him by their imprisonment in a Xinjiang internment camp, are coming to Canada; Bugz facing the real-world consequences of online trolling; the journey of the soul of Waawaate; and Bugz attempting to come to terms with her brother's death by recreating him in the Floraverse (the massively multiplayer open-source game that is central to the story) only to find that he becomes a vengeful force beyond her control.

== Reception ==
Evelyn Hussey concluded that

Overall this book had excellent world-building that captures the reader’s attention immediately. There is a lot of virtual reality and Floraverse jargon that can be difficult to understand. Readers must be very detail-oriented to follow the timeline of events as the slipping between the 'Verse and the real world occurs rather quickly, and it can be hard to keep track of, as the lines begin to feel blurred. The Everlasting Road is an exciting sequel to Kinew’s first novel, and I recommend this series to fans of futurism and action novels.
