= Carla Compton =

Canadian politician

Carla Compton MLA

Minister Responsible for Accessibility
- Incumbent
- Assumed office September 28, 2026
- Preceded by: Nahanni Fontaine

Member of the Legislative Assembly of Manitoba for Tuxedo
- Incumbent
- Assumed office July 8, 2024
- Preceded by: Heather Stefanson

Personal details
- Party: New Democratic
- Occupation: Registered nurse

Carla Compton is a Canadian registered nurse and politician from the New Democratic Party of Manitoba.

== Political career ==
Compton was elected to the Legislative Assembly of Manitoba in the 2024 Tuxedo provincial by-election. She succeeded former Progressive Conservative leader Heather Stefanson.

In the 2019 Manitoba general election, Compton ran unsuccessfully in Tuxedo.

In September 2026, she was appointed to the Cabinet of Manitoba. Compton was sworn in as Minister Responsible for Accessibility.

== Personal life ==
Compton’s great-uncle George Compton served as an MLA in Manitoba from 1922–1927.

== Electoral history ==
Manitoba provincial by-election, June 18, 2024: Tuxedo Resignation of Heather Stefanson
| Party | Candidate | Votes | % | ±% | Expenditures |
|---|---|---|---|---|---|
| New Democratic | Carla Compton | 3,777 | 49.44 | +11.95 | |
| Progressive Conservative | Lawrence Pinsky | 3,175 | 41.56 | +1.36 | |
| Liberal | Jamie Pfau | 569 | 7.45 | -14.85 | |
| Green | Janine Gibson | 118 | 1.54 | | |
| Total valid votes | | 7,639 | 99.58 | | |
| Total rejected and declined ballots | | 32 | 0.42 | +0.01 | |
| Turnout | | 7,671 | 45.62 | -14.24 | |
| Eligible voters | | 16,814 | | | |
| New Democratic gain from Progressive Conservative | | Swing | | +5.30 | |

2019 Manitoba general election: Tuxedo
| Party | Candidate | Votes | % | ±% | Expenditures |
|---|---|---|---|---|---|
| Progressive Conservative | Heather Stefanson | 4,645 | 47.85 | -5.2 | $21,522.01 |
| Liberal | Marc Brandson | 2,287 | 23.56 | +5.0 | $4,961.95 |
| New Democratic | Carla Compton | 1,921 | 19.79 | +5.5 | $614.25 |
| Green | Kristin Lauhn-Jensen | 793 | 8.17 | -5.8 | $0.00 |
| Manitoba First | Abby Al-Sahi | 61 | 0.63 | New | $2,520.94 |
| Total valid votes | | 9,707 | 99.19 | | |
| Total rejected ballots | | 79 | 0.81 | | |
| Turnout | | 9,786 | 57.90 | | |
| Eligible voters | | 16,903 | | | |
| Progressive Conservative hold | | Swing | | -5.1 | |
