= Brady Road Landfill =

Landfill in Canada

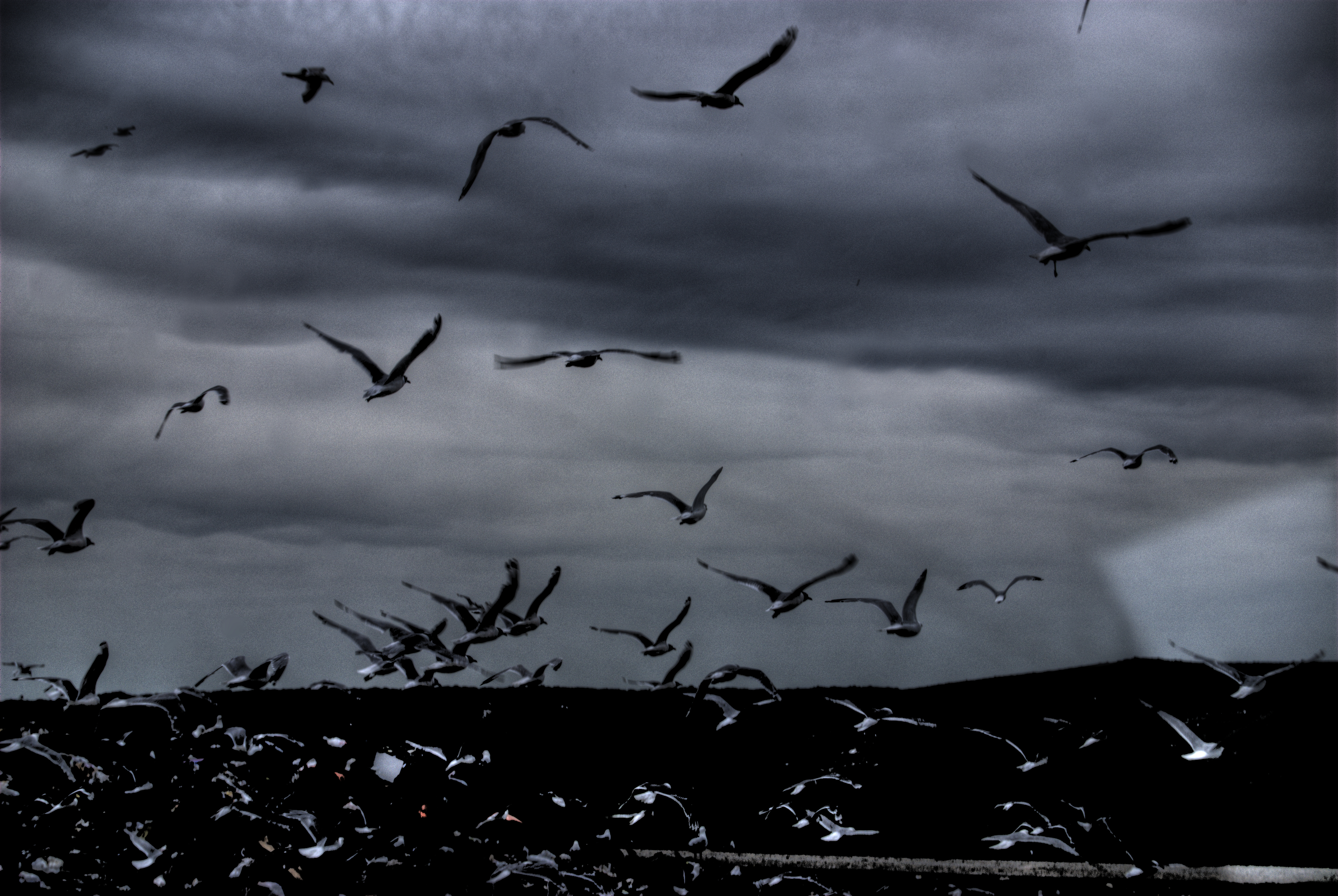
- Seagulls at the landfill in 2008
- Interactive map of the Brady Road Landfill area

General information
- Location: Winnipeg, 1777 Brady Road, Winnipeg, Canada
- Coordinates: 49.74°N 97.21°W
- Owner: City of Winnipeg

Brady Road Landfill is a landfill in Winnipeg, Manitoba, Canada.

== Description ==
The Brandy Road Landfill is a sprawling municipal landfill located on 1777 Brady Road, on the outskirts of Winnipeg.

== History ==
The landfill caught fire in 2012. In 2013, the City of Winnipeg began capturing methane from the landfill originally using 42 gas well, expanding to 63 in 2017. One of the pipes broke in June 2018, preventing the flaring of the gas captured from three of the wells.

In 2015, user fees at the landfill increased from a minimum of $11 to $15. In 2016, the landfill expanded services to support composting, reuse and recycling of waste.

In June 2022, police identified the remains of homicide victim Rebecca Contois in the landfill. A member of the O-Chi-Chak-Ko-Sipi First Nation, Contois was one of several victims of the 2022 Winnipeg serial killings. That year, the landfill was the only landfill in Winnipeg.

In 2023, Camp Morgan was created blocking access to the landfill, as public calls to search the nearby Prairie Green landfill for the remains of suspected homicide victims Morgan Harris and Marcedes Myran.

== See also ==
- Missing and Murdered Indigenous Women
- Municipal waste management in Winnipeg
