= Live By the Drum =

Studio album by Wab Kinew
- Released: January 24, 2009
- Genre: Hip hop

Wab Kinew chronology
Live By the Drum (2009)	Mide-Sun (2010)

Live By the Drum is the first album by Canadian former singer-songwriter and current Premier of Manitoba Wab Kinew.

== Track listing ==
No.	Title	Writer(s)	Length
1.	"Once Again"	Wab Kinew	4:52
2.	"Breakthrough"	Wab Kinew	4:08
3.	"U is wrong"	Wab Kinew	4:47
4.	"Killa Peg"	Wab Kinew	4:40
5.	"When I'm Gone"	Wab Kinew	4:18
6.	"If This Was Right"	Wab Kinew, Dominique Reynolds	3:46
7.	"Live By the Drum"	Wab Kinew	3:06
8.	"A Night Up In"	Wab Kinew	4:19
9.	"Not Even"	Wab Kinew	4:08
10.	"Pop A Pill"	Wab Kinew, Paul Katsnelson	5:14
11.	"Breezy"	Wab Kinew, Ken Genaille	4:00
12.	"Stand N Fight"	Wab Kinew	5:05
13.	"Summer Vibe"	Wab Kinew, Don Amero	4:17
14.	"Last Word"	Wab Kinew, Tinsel Korey	3:37
