= Municipal waste management in Winnipeg =

Statistical data shows that waste management in Winnipeg during the COVID-19 Pandemic.

== Generation ==
The statistical data show that with the increase in the GDP per capita of Winnipeg, waste generation decreased due to the increased effectiveness of the municipal waste management plan after 2005. The city of Winnipeg has implemented various strategies to address municipal waste treatment.

== Treatment ==
On October 19, 2011, the Winnipeg City Council approved the master plan of a comprehensive waste management plan, requested by the City Council to the Public Service on June 23, 2010, for the entire city to increase the waste diversion rate to 50% or more. This plan would achieve this target by reducing household garbage and by increasing household recycling. This plan was made effective for municipal waste management by Winnipeg in the first week of October 2012.

The Comprehensive Waste Management Plan is based on three main guiding principles which were established through the Phase – 1 participation process and input from the Stakeholder Advisory Committee. These principles help to shape the goals and objectives of the Garbage and Recycling Master Plan (GRMP) that helps to guide potential options for the garbage, recycling, and organic services in Winnipeg. Those Principles are:

1. Sustainability – Environmental, economic, and social factors are being considered in the decision-making process under this principle. These factors are intertwined with each other and so are they are needed to be evaluated together – not as three separate parts. Figure – 3.
2. Waste Hierarchy – this principle places priority on preventing waste generation (reducing and reusing); maximizing waste diversion (recycling and recovery) and minimizing disposal (residuals). Figure –
3. Zero Waste – The Federation of Canadian Municipalities, defines this as A community that "has made a long-term commitment to reducing waste through measures such as extended producer responsibility programs, economic instruments to encourage waste reduction, green procurement and product design that includes end-of-life management.

Fig-4 Waste Hierarchy

The municipal waste management by Winnipeg City is consistent with the Provincial regulations. A curbside collection of recyclables to the residential locations is provided by the City of Winnipeg. Figure – 5 shows the residential recycling reports that show that recycling at the residential level in Winnipeg has an 85% of participation rate, which results in diverting approximately 48,087 tonnes of recyclable materials from the waste landfill disposal stream. This tonnage is equivalent to approximately 17% of the waste stream. Recyclables that are collected by the City of Winnipeg from the residential locations include a standard list of blue box material that includes:

- Plastic containers with a recycling triangle on the bottom, including all bottles, pails, tubs, and jugs
- Aluminum drink cans
- Steel (tin) food cans
- Milk and juice cartons
- Juice boxes
- Newspapers and inserts, flyers, and junk mail
- Magazines, phone books, household paper, shredded paper, and envelopes
- Cardboard egg cartons and paper tubes
- Flattened cardboard, no more than 1 meter in any direction, e.g., cereal, cracker, tissue, laundry,
- Shoe and packing boxes
- Glass jars and bottles (clear and colored).

Some other programs have been undertaken by the City of Winnipeg other than recycling for Waste minimization and diversion. These programs include Leaf-It Depots, Chin-In Depots, and a Backyard Composting program. Winnipeg also has seven general-use recycling depots around the city. The net cost of the current recycling program depends on the market rates for the recycled materials and the level of funding received under Provincial regulation. Over the past 15 years, Winnipeg City has recycled more than 700 million kg of waste through the Manitoba Product Stewardship Corporation (MPSC), which pays 80% of the net cost of the recycling service.

The reduction of waste at or near the source of generation is known as Source Reduction of waste and this is one of the most important and promising methods for reduction in the waste generation for the growing waste in Canada. The Source Separated Organics (SSO) also counts under the treatments of municipal waste and source reduction techniques. This treatment helps in minimizing the waste in other words SSO is used for diverting solid wastes from the landfills. These SSO have comprised about 1/ 3 to 1/2 of the total residential waste of Winnipeg. SSO includes materials like kitchen waste, yard waste, etc. and Winnipeg did about 53% of the total (kitchen + yard waste) of composting that includes 24% of Kitchen waste and 68% of Yard waste. This SSO is separated from the undesirable materials that are then sent to the curbside collection as a separate residual waste stream.

The City of Winnipeg is evaluating new technologies and processes for resource recovery, such as thermal oxidation, carbonizing, aerobic digestion, pelletizing, and organic waste management. The decomposition of organic waste releases methane gas, and landfills consisting of organic waste generate methane gas, known for its harmful effects on the environment as a greenhouse gas (GHG). National statistics indicate that 4% of the total GHG emissions are generated from landfills. The City of Winnipeg may at some point use this gas as a resource recovery opportunity at the Brady Landfill site to displace natural gas or to produce electricity. Currently the gas is being collected via in-ground perforated pipe under negative pressure and flared. Talks between the city, Manitoba Hydro and the University of Manitoba about supplying this gas to the campus (approx.. 6 km away) has not led to any action to date. Alternatively, the gas could be added to the grid once it was scrubbed to remove H_{2}S, CO_{2}, and water.

The City of Winnipeg currently composts yard wastes during summer months and has initiated a pilot curbside pick-up of kitchen organics for approximately 4000 residences. This project will be assessed in 2023.

== Municipal waste generation and economic development in Winnipeg ==
The statistics shown in table below is the data representation of waste generation and economic development of Winnipeg City, and shows the municipal Waste Generation, Population and real GDP of the city. Here real GDP is used as an economic growth indicator of the city.

Sr. No.	Year	Population	Real GDP (million $)	Total MW (tons)	MW (kg/capita/year)
1	1997	618477	19340	225149	330.24
2	2001	619544	21517	254334	372.41
3	2006	633451	24035	274355	392.91
4	2011	663617	26463	255576	349.37

In 1997, the population of Winnipeg was approximately 618,477 whereas the real GDP of the city was approximately $19,340 million. At the same time, the waste generation of the city was 225,149 tons/yr, with an average of 330.24 kg/per capita/yr. In 2001, the population was 619,544, real GDP was $21,517 million, and the waste generation in the city was 254,334 tons/yr, with an average of 372.41 kg/per capita/yr.

According to table-1 faced maximum waste generation in the year 2006, with a population of 633,451, real GDP of $24,035 million, and a waste generation of 274,355 tons/yr. with an average of 392.91 kg/per capita/yr. This data shows that the City of Winnipeg was facing the challenge of an increasing population, increasing GDP, and, at the same time, an increase in waste generation of Winnipeg.

After realizing the challenge, the City of Winnipeg increased its Waste Management efficiency and the results are represented in table-1 and figure-1. In the year 2011, the City of Winnipeg was able to reduce the waste generation of the city, despite the growing population.
