= Wab Kinew =

Premier of Manitoba since 2023

The Honourable Wab Kinew MLA
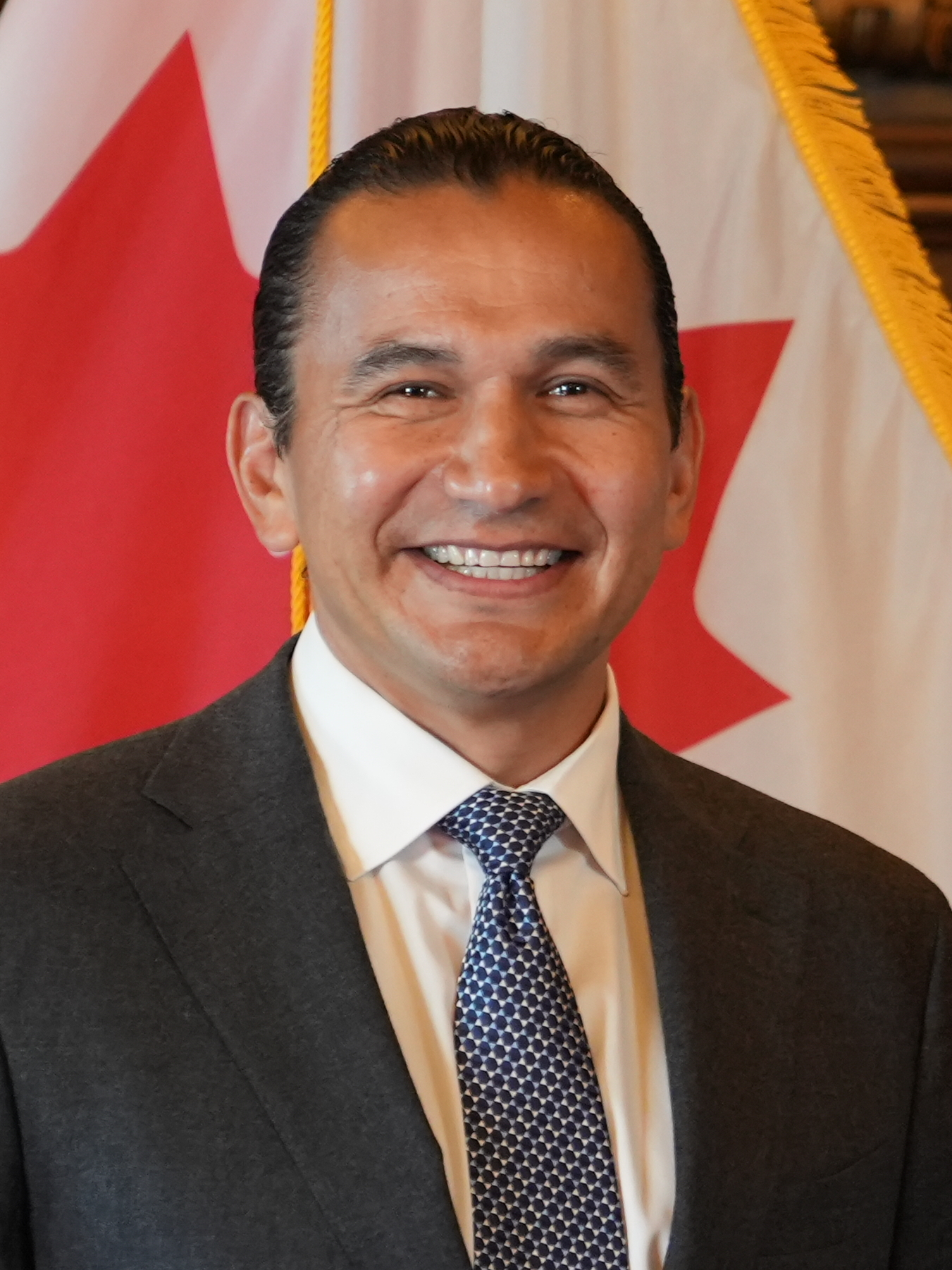
- Kinew in 2024

25th Premier of Manitoba
- Incumbent
- Assumed office October 18, 2023
- Monarch: Charles III
- Lieutenant Governor: Anita Neville
- Deputy: Uzoma Asagwara
- Preceded by: Heather Stefanson

Leader of the Manitoba New Democratic Party
- Incumbent
- Assumed office September 16, 2017
- Preceded by: Flor Marcelino (interim)

Member of the Legislative Assembly of Manitoba for Fort Rouge
- Incumbent
- Assumed office April 19, 2016
- Preceded by: Jennifer Howard

Leader of the Opposition in Manitoba
- In office September 16, 2017 – October 18, 2023
- Preceded by: Flor Marcelino
- Succeeded by: Heather Stefanson

Personal details
- Born: Wabanakwut Kinew; December 31, 1981 (age 44) Kenora, Ontario, Canada
- Party: New Democratic
- Spouse: Lisa Monkman (m. 2014)
- Children: 3
- Education: University of Manitoba (BA); University of Winnipeg (MA)
- Occupation: Politician; broadcaster; musician; university administrator; author
- Cabinet: Kinew ministry
- Website: wabkinew.ca

Wabanakwut "Wab" Kinew (Note: /wɑːb kɪˈnuː/) (born December 31, 1981) is a Canadian politician who has served as the 25th premier of Manitoba since 2023 and the leader of the Manitoba New Democratic Party (NDP) since 2017. Kinew represents Fort Rouge in the Legislative Assembly of Manitoba and was the leader of the Opposition from 2017 until his party's victory in the 2023 provincial election.

Before entering politics, Kinew was an author, musician, broadcaster and university administrator, best known as a host of programming on CBC Radio and CBC Television. Kinew is Canada's first provincial premier of First Nations descent, and Manitoba's first Indigenous premier since Métis Premier John Norquay in 1887.

== Early life and education ==
Wabanakwut "Wab" Kinew was born on December 31, 1981, in Kenora, Ontario. From the Ojibways of Onigaming First Nation in Northwestern Ontario, he is the son of Tobasonakwut Kinew, a former local and regional chief and a professor of Indigenous governance at the University of Winnipeg, and Dr. Kathi Avery Kinew, a policy analyst.

Kinew moved to suburban Winnipeg with his parents in childhood and attended Collège Béliveau, a French immersion school, and vacationed in Onigaming in the summers. He graduated from the University of Winnipeg Collegiate, a private high school which Kinew said in a 2014 interview was "one of the best in Winnipeg." Kinew went on to earn a Bachelor of Arts degree in economics from the University of Manitoba, later pursuing a master's degree in Indigenous governance.

== Career ==
=== Broadcasting and media ===
Kinew began working in broadcasting after the Winnipeg Free Press published a letter to the editor which he had written about Team Canada hockey, and a local CBC Radio producer contacted him to express interest in creating and airing a documentary feature on the matter.

In 2010, Kinew was a finalist for the Future Leaders of Manitoba award and lost to Canadian filmmaker and director Adam Smoluk. Other notable finalists of the award include Olympic champion Jennifer Jones, radio personality David 'Ace' Burpee, friend of Bell Let's Talk Karuna (Andi) Sharma, artist Kal Barteski, and Canadian restaurateur and philanthropist Sachit Mehra.

Kinew was a reporter and host for the CBC's radio and television operations, including the weekly arts magazine show The 204 in Winnipeg and the national documentary series 8th Fire in 2012. He was also a host of the documentary program Fault Lines on Al Jazeera America. For his work on 8th Fire, Kinew was nominated for a Canadian Screen Award.

In 2014, he appeared as a panelist on CBC Radio's Canada Reads, defending Joseph Boyden's novel The Orenda; the novel won the competition. Kinew was a guest host of Q for two weeks in December 2014, and moderated the 2015 edition of Canada Reads.

=== Music ===
After being a member of the hip-hop groups Slangblossom and the Dead Indians in the mid-2000s, Kinew released his debut individual CD as a rapper, Live by the Drum, in 2009. The CD won an Aboriginal Peoples Choice Music Award for Best Rap/Hip-Hop CD. His second CD, Mide-Sun, followed in 2010.

=== University administration ===
In 2011, the University of Winnipeg named Kinew its first director of Indigenous Inclusion. In 2014, Kinew was appointed associate vice-president of Indigenous Relations after Jennifer Rattray resigned the position. He is also an honorary witness for the Indian Residential Schools Truth and Reconciliation Commission.

On October 25, 2014, Kinew received an honorary doctorate degree from Cape Breton University.

=== Books ===
Kinew has written a total of six books—The Reason You Walk, Go Show the World, Walking in Two Worlds, The Everlasting Road, An Anishinaabe Christmas, and We Are Who We Are: An Ode to Indigenous Heroes Past and Present—all published by Penguin Canada.

The Reason You Walk is a memoir that chronicles the year 2012, during which Kinew strove to reconnect with the Indigenous man who raised him. In the book, Kinew details his point of view on several controversial matters related to his past, including convictions resulting from alcoholism, his assault of a taxicab driver, and misogynistic and homophobic lyrics from his music career. A reviewer for The Globe and Mail commented: "the undeniable significance of The Reason You Walk's message, and the fact that the book holds so much for both aboriginal and non-aboriginal readers, makes it a must-read. This is not just a memoir, it's a meditation on the purpose of living." Kinew was honoured with the 2016 Kobo Emerging Writer Prize for non-fiction, for this book, which comes with a $10,000 cash award. It has been pointed out that Kinew's account of the incident in his book heavily differs from what was heard in court during his 2004 sentencing hearing.

In 2018, Kinew published a children's book, Go Show the World: A Celebration of Indigenous Heroes, about notable figures in First Nations history, including John Herrington, Sacagawea, Carey Price, and Crazy Horse. He was inspired to write the stories of such people by Barack Obama's Of Thee I Sing, and K'naan's song Take a Minute. The book went on to make the 2018 Governor General's Literary Award for young people's literature – illustrated shortlist.

In 2021, Kinew released Walking in Two Worlds, a young adult fantasy novel published by Penguin Teen, in which an Indigenous teen girl is caught between the real world and a virtual video-game universe. The book won Kinew an Aurora Award for science fiction and fantasy in 2022.

== Political career ==
Kinew considered running for the leadership of the Assembly of First Nations in its 2014 leadership election, but decided not to mount a campaign as he was newly married in August and felt that it was not the right time to be away from home for an extended period.

In 2016, he was announced as a Manitoba New Democratic Party candidate for Fort Rouge for the 2016 provincial election. During the final days of the campaign, misogynistic and homophobic tweets and other social media comments were discovered by media on Kinew's Twitter feed. This created a scandal with calls for the New Democratic Party to drop Kinew from the ballot. Following an apology for his past comments, at the election on April 19, 2016, Kinew defeated Manitoba Liberal Party leader Rana Bokhari in the riding of Fort Rouge. He was subsequently named the NDP's spokesperson for reconciliation and opposition critic for Education, Advanced Learning, and Training, as well as for Housing and Community Development.

Kinew was a candidate in the 2017 Manitoba NDP leadership election; at the September 16 convention, he defeated the only other candidate, former cabinet minister Steve Ashton, by a margin of 728 votes to 253. This made Kinew the first elected First Nations leader of a major party in Manitoba's history.

In 2017, Kinew introduced Bill 223 to mark September 30 as Orange Shirt Day, a day meant to honour residential school survivors, while in 2019, he introduced Bill 228, the Sikh Heritage Month Act. Later in 2019 Kinew also put forward a private member's bill that would bestow title of honorary first premier to Métis leader Louis Riel and require Riel's contributions be part of the school curriculum.

Kinew led the Manitoba NDP into the 2019 provincial election; the party gained six seats but the Progressive Conservative Party were re-elected to a majority.

Kinew continued as leader after the 2019 election, following which the NDP gained a lead over the governing PCs in polling. Ahead of the 2023 provincial election, the race tightened during the campaign period. The NDP campaign focused on healthcare reform. The NDP won the election, making Kinew the first First Nations person, and second Indigenous person overall, to be elected a provincial premier in Canada.

=== Premier (2023–present) ===
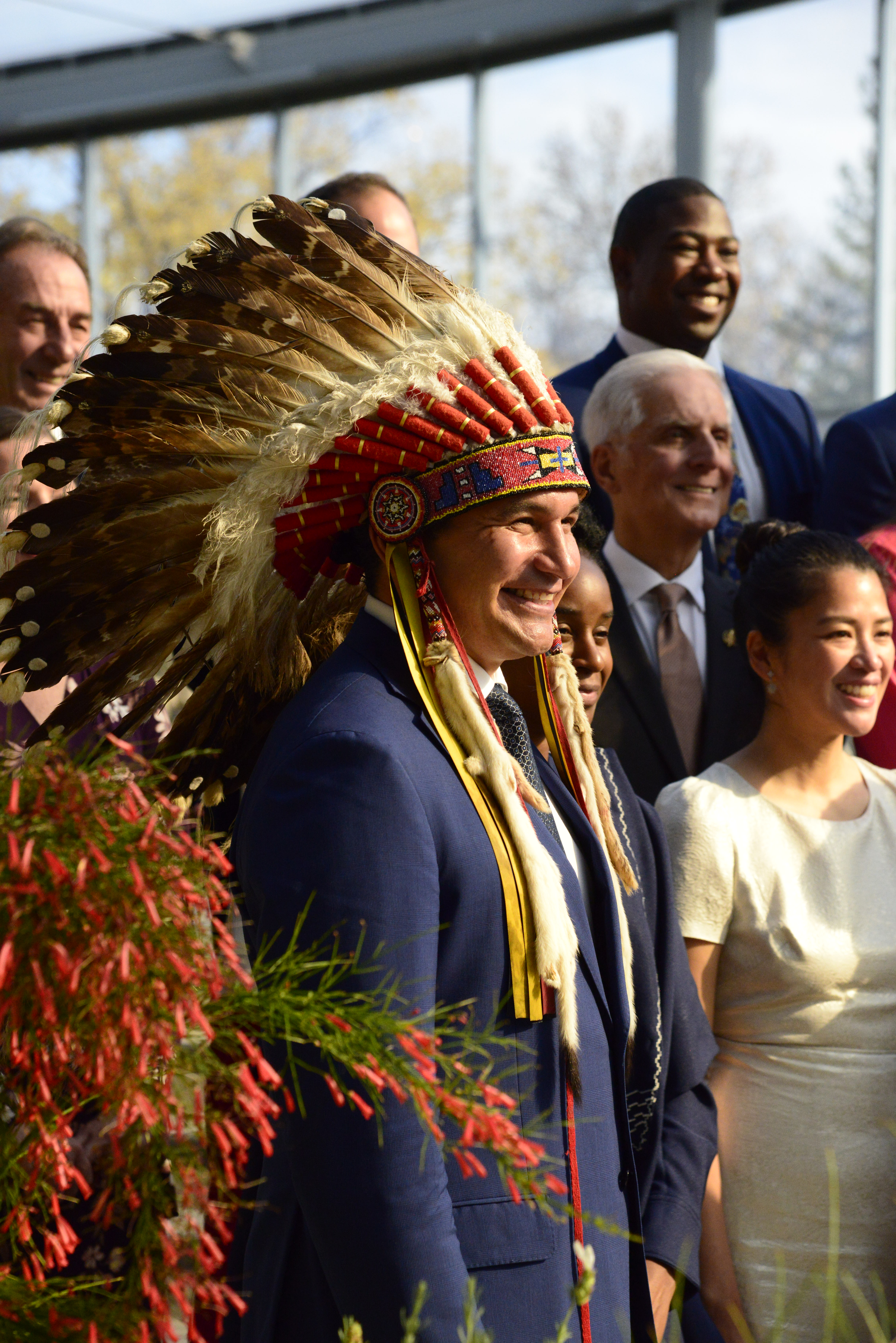
Kinew at his swearing-in ceremony on October 18, 2023

Kinew was sworn in as premier of Manitoba on October 18, 2023. During his first year as premier, Kinew implemented his campaign promise of a provincial fuel tax holiday until the end of 2024, costing the provincial government $340 million in tax revenue. In addition to the provincial fuel holiday, Kinew's government also announced a 5-point plan to address crime and public safety, including plans to create a community monitoring and supervision program for chronic offenders. His party campaigned on searching the Prairie Green Landfill for the remains of some victims of the 2022 Winnipeg serial killings, which began in December 2024. The remains of Morgan Harris and Marcedes Myran were found on February 26, 2025, at the landfill. Harris and Myran were respectively identified by police on March 7 and March 17, 2025. Kinew stated that as a result of the quick discovery, the search was significantly under budget.

Kinew also campaigned on promises to strengthen Manitoba's healthcare system. Efforts as of December 2024 include provincial coverage for prescription birth control and menopause transition medications under pharmacare, expanded capacity of existing health clinics across Manitoba, the opening of the first of five new neighbourhood health clinics in Manitoba, and revamping the province's paper health card with the introduction of plastic ones starting in 2025. In the NDP's 2024 budget, spending increased by 6%. In December 2024, Kinew pledged to combat homelessness by starting to move homeless people from homeless encampments into proper housing in 2025. In 2025, he signed agreements with other provinces to reduce interprovincial trade barriers in the midst of the United States trade war with Canada.

Kinew has announced a meth task force to combat drug trafficking. In the energy file, the Kinew government froze some electricity exports to the United States. The government also redirected U.S. hydro exports to Canadian projects. His government created a new Manitoba Crown Indigenous Corporation in 2025.

Kinew has promoted the expansion of the Port of Churchill. The $51 million for the Arctic Gateway Group will improve the Hudson Bay rail line and to build a new critical-minerals storage facility at the Port of Churchill. The project seeks to increase northern trade.

His government's 2026 budget reported a $498 million deficit and included provisions such as the elimination of the provincial sales tax on groceries and the continuation of a price freeze on one-litre milk cartons.

== Personal life ==
Kinew recounts that he "experienced racially motivated assaults by adults" during his time growing up in suburban Winnipeg.

Some time after moving out of his parents' home at the age of 19, Kinew began experiencing problems with alcohol.

On February 24, 2003, Kinew was arrested in Winnipeg, after he was spotted erratically driving his father's 2000 Dodge Dakota by Henderson Highway late in the evening. A witness testified in court that they followed Kinew for several kilometres and saw him lose control of his vehicle twice after striking a guard rail and street light. Kinew continued to drive several more kilometres with a blown-out front tire before police caught up to him at a parkade. Police reported Kinew as having bloodshot eyes and slurred speech, as well as being unsteady on his feet. A near-empty bottle of gin that had been purchased that afternoon was found in the back seat. Kinew refused to undergo a breathalyzer after being taken into custody. For this incident, Kinew was convicted of impaired driving.

In June 2003, Kinew was charged by the RCMP with two counts of domestic assault related to allegations that he threw his then-girlfriend, Tara Hart, across a room during an argument. A Crown attorney and Kinew's lawyer appeared in court several times between January and June 2004. The charges were subsequently stayed. Kinew denies the allegations, while Hart has continued to maintain otherwise. These charges were previously unknown to most during Kinew's public life, only coming to light in 2017 via anonymous emails sent to Winnipeg media outlets. Hart has said that she can only recall one alleged assault and does not know why two charges were filed. She has stated that after she left Kinew, she was living outside Winnipeg and never heard from the Crown on why the charges were stayed.

On June 27, 2004, while bound by a court recognizance on his previous DUI charge, Kinew was arrested following an altercation with a taxi driver. Kinew was intoxicated when he caught the cab shortly before 5 in the morning. According to the Crown prosecutor, Kinew "began to insult the [cab driver] with some racial comments which continued until the driver reached the intersection of Portage Avenue and Fort Street." While stopped at a red light, Kinew exited the vehicle, approached the driver's side door window, which was open, and punched the driver in the face. A passerby yelled out and momentarily interrupted the assault. When the driver exited the cab, Kinew pushed him to the ground and kicked him, according to CBC News. Kinew attempted to flee the scene when police arrived, and Kinew declined to discuss the incident after being taken into custody. The taxi driver suffered a small laceration to his elbow and swelling to his face. On page 70 of his 2015 memoir, The Reason You Walk, Kinew has stated he had grabbed a cab with friends and "hopped out without paying," after which:

[T]he driver caught up with us and pushed me. I turned around and shoved him back. A passing cabbie saw what was happening, stopped his taxi and jumped out to help his fellow driver. He swung and hit me in the face. I grabbed him and swung back. We stood in the middle of the street, arms flailing in full-on hockey fight mode. The police showed up and tackled me.

It has been pointed out that Kinew's account of the incident in his book heavily differs from what was heard in court during his 2004 sentencing hearing.

Also in 2004, Kinew was given a conditional discharge for an assault in Ontario after getting into a fight. Kinew also has stated that in 2006 he was charged with stealing a money order, but that charge was stayed when he repaid the money.

Kinew has gone through various exercises to rehabilitate himself from his issues with alcohol, including attending sweat lodges and a sun dance ceremony where he fasted for four days and pulled buffalo skulls by piercings cut into his body. Kinew also began attending regular Alcoholics Anonymous meetings.

Kinew has since quit drinking and, in 2014, applied for a pardon from the Canadian government, which was granted by the Parole Board of Canada in 2016. The Parole Board ruling removed from the Canadian Police Information Centre database references to his convictions on assaulting a taxi driver, a driving under the influence conviction for refusing a breathalyzer sample, and two breaches of court orders.

In September 2016, Kinew married Dr. Lisa Monkman, an Ojibwe family physician who practises medicine at an inner-city clinic. The couple welcomed a son in May 2017. Kinew has two sons from a previous relationship.

Kinew is trilingual: he speaks Ojibwe, English and French.

== Works ==
=== Bibliography ===
- The Reason You Walk: A Memoir (2015)
- Go Show the World: A Celebration of Indigenous Heroes (2018)
- Walking in Two Worlds (2021)
- The Everlasting Road (2023)
- An Anishinaabe Christmas (2024)
- We Are Who We Are: An Ode to Indigenous Heroes Past and Present (2026)

=== Radio ===
Year	Title	Role	Notes
?–2011	ReVision Quest	Himself/host	
2010–2011	The 204	Himself/host	
2014	Q	Himself/interim host	

=== Television and film ===
Year	Title	Role	Notes
2009–2010	Fault Lines	Himself/host	
2010	Surviving the Survivor	Himself/host	
2012	8th Fire	Himself/host	
2013	Gifts from the Elders	Himself/narrator	
2014–2015	Canada Reads	Moderator/panelist	

=== Discography ===
List of albums
Year	Album details	Notes
2009	Live By the Drum: Released: January 24, 2009	
2010	Mide-Sun: Released: September 4, 2010	

== Awards and nominations ==
Year	Award	Category	Nominee	Result	Refs
2009	Aboriginal Peoples' Choice Awards	Best Rap/Hip-Hop CD	Live By the Drum	Won	
2009	imagineNATIVE Film and Media Arts Festival	Best Radio	ReVision Quest	Won	
2011	Gemini Awards	Best News Information Segment	Surviving the Survivor (as producer)	Nominated	
2013	Canadian Screen Awards	Host or interviewer, news or information program or series	8th Fire	Nominated	
2016	Manitoba Book Awards	Book of the Year	The Reason You Walk	Won	
2016	RBC Taylor Prize		The Reason You Walk	Nominated	
2016	Dayton Literary Peace Prize		The Reason You Walk	Nominated	
2016	Kobo Emerging Writer Prize	Nonfiction	The Reason You Walk	Won	
2016	Norma Fleck Award		The Reason You Walk	Nominated	
2018	Governor General's Awards	English-language young people's literature - illustrated books	Go Show the World: A Celebration of Indigenous Heroes	Nominated	
2019	Norma Fleck Award		Go Show the World: A Celebration of Indigenous Heroes	Nominated	
2022	Aurora Awards	Best YA Novel	Walking in Two Worlds	Won	
2023	Forest of Reading Red Maple Award		Walking in Two Worlds	Nominated	

== Electoral record ==
2023 Manitoba general election: Fort Rouge
Party	Candidate	Votes	%	±%	Expenditures
New Democratic	Wab Kinew	6,761	70.57	+19.33	$23,088.15
Progressive Conservative	Rejeanne Caron	1,566	16.34	−2.48	$0.00
Liberal	Katherine Johnson	1,152	12.02	−1.05	$5,193.76
Communist	Robert Crooks	102	1.06	–	$106.40
Total valid votes/expense limit		9,581	99.59	–	$64,588.00
Total rejected and declined ballots		39	0.41	–	
Turnout		9,620	58.04	−0.73	
Eligible voters		16,576			
New Democratic hold		Swing		+10.90	
Source(s) Source: Elections Manitoba

2019 Manitoba general election: Fort Rouge
Party	Candidate	Votes	%	±%	Expenditures
New Democratic	Wab Kinew	5,055	51.24	13.60	$23,922.64
Progressive Conservative	Edna Nabess	1,857	18.82	−9.97	$7,290.07
Green	James Beddome	1,580	16.01	5.00	$8,974.33
Liberal	Cyndy Friesen	1,290	13.08	−7.00	$8,223.63
Manitoba First	Michael McCracken	54	0.55	−1.41	$582.58
Manitoba Forward	Bradley Hebert	30	0.30	–	$0.00
Total valid votes		9,866	–	–	
Rejected		47	–		
Eligible voters / turnout		16,870	58.76	−6.39	
Source(s) Source: Manitoba. Chief Electoral Officer (2019). Statement of Votes for the 42nd Provincial General Election, September 10, 2019 (PDF) (Report). Winnipeg: Elections Manitoba. "Candidate Election Returns". Elections Manitoba. Elections Manitoba.

2016 Manitoba general election: Fort Rouge
Party	Candidate	Votes	%	±%	Expenditures
New Democratic	Wab Kinew	3,360	37.63	−13.63	$39,199.49
Progressive Conservative	Audrey Gordon	2,571	28.80	8.64	$42,245.54
Liberal	Rana Bokhari	1,792	20.07	−3.06	$30,238.82
Green	Grant Sharp	983	11.01	5.57	$322.90
Manitoba	Matthew Ostrove	175	1.96	–	$945.26
Communist	Paula Ducharme	47	0.53	–	$33.67
Total valid votes / expense limit		8,928	–	–	$44,855.00
Rejected		125	–		
Eligible voters / turnout		13,896	65.15	3.92	
New Democratic hold		Swing		–11.04	
Source(s) Source: Manitoba. Chief Electoral Officer (2016). Statement of Votes for the 41st Provincial General Election, April 19, 2016 (PDF) (Report). Winnipeg: Elections Manitoba. "Election Returns: 41st General Election". Elections Manitoba. 2016.

== Notes ==
Order of precedence
Preceded by Susan Holt as Premier of New Brunswick	Canadian order of precedence as Premier of Manitoba	Succeeded by David Eby as Premier of British Columbia
Preceded by Anita Neville as Lieutenant Governor of Manitoba	Order of precedence in Manitoba as Premier of Manitoba	Succeeded by Marianne Rivoalen as Chief Justice of Manitoba
