= Bagonegiizhig =

Bagonegiizhig is a masculine personal name in some spelling systems of the Ojibwe language.

Notable bearers of the name include:

- Hole in the Day (c. 1825–1868)
- Bugonaygeshig (c. 1830s–1916)
