= Charles Mair =

Canadian poet and journalist (1838–1927)

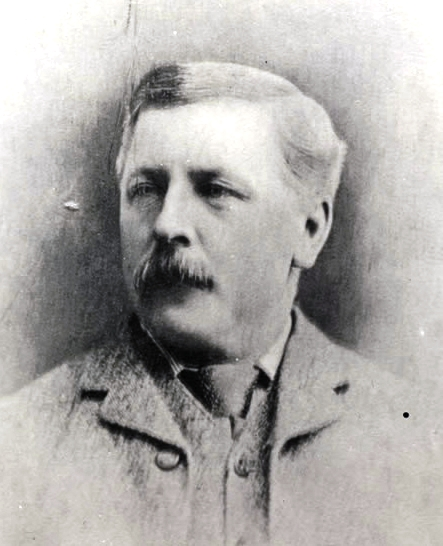
- Born: September 21, 1838; Lanark, Upper Canada
- Died: July 7, 1927 (aged 88); Victoria, British Columbia, Canada
- Resting place: Ross Bay Cemetery, Victoria
- Education: Queen's University
- Occupation: Journalist
- Writing career
- Language: English
- Genre: poetry
- Notable work: Tecumseh
- Notable awards: FRSC

Charles Mair (September 21, 1838 – July 7, 1927) was a Canadian poet and journalist. He was a fervent Canadian nationalist noted for his participation in the Canada First movement and his opposition to Louis Riel during the two Riel Rebellions in western Canada.

== Early life and education ==
Mair was born at Lanark, Upper Canada, to Margaret Holmes and James Mair. He attended Queen's University but left it after one year to help with the family’s troubled businesses in Lanark.

== Career ==
On leaving college, Mair became a journalist.

In Ottawa in 1868, Mair was introduced by civil servant and writer Henry Morgan to young lawyers George Denison, William Foster, and Robert Haliburton. The three organized the Canada First Movement, a small openly nationalist social group which grew over time.

Mair reported for the Montreal Gazette during the first Riel Rebellion in 1869-70, during which time he was twice imprisoned, and sentenced to execution, but managed to escape that fate in the Spring of 1870. He wrote extensively in opposition to Riel's cause, and his columns incensed the citizenry of Red River. At a dinner given by Alexander Begg; Annie McDermot Bannatyne, the Métis daughter of Andrew McDermot and wife of Andrew Graham Ballenden Bannatyne, reacted to Mair's account of tensions between Métis and white wives with a public slap and horse-whipping, which inspired the first western roman-à-clef, Begg's 1871 Dot it Down: A Story of Life in the Northwest, presenting "a caricature of Mair as a self-important Upper Canadian flirt who dots down his sneering observations about the west", according to the Dictionary of Canadian Biography.

In 1885, during the second Riel Rebellion, Mair served an Officer of the Governor-General's Body Guard. He worked as a civil servant in the Canadian west, and, in 1899, was appointed as secretary to the Métis Scrip Commission. He travelled thousands of miles through the northwest, and kept a journal of his experiences which contains historical details about the treaty negotiations, and about the native and Métis people and places of the time. However, "Mair’s prose, and the reaction to it, obscured his road work, which drew more resentment."

Mair was a Freemason

He died in Victoria, British Columbia.

== Writing ==
Mair published the first book of poetry in post-Confederation Canada, 1868's Dreamland and Other Poems. Although the poetry was not particularly notable, it became popular after Mair was captured by Louis Riel and managed to escape.

The Dictionary of Canadian Biography (DCB) states that Dreamland "demonstrates a conventional colonial approach to poetry. Such poems as 'August' succeed in their attention to natural detail: descriptions of the blueflies, the milkmaids, and the 'ribby-lean' cattle in parched fields anticipate the mature nature poetry of Archibald Lampman. But too often he wrote not of the timberlands he knew but of a dreamland weakly modelled upon the romantic flights of Keats." However, the book was praised by "the established poet Charles Sangster, who referred to Canada's sophisticated literary tradition as one that was habitually overlooked in the popular press."

Writing later in the Ottawa Journal, William Wilfred Campbell saw Dreamland as a precursor to the nature poetry later popularized in Canada by the Confederation Poets: "The thirty-three poems constitute the first attempt to deal with Canadian nature, in the manner of Keats and the other classic poets, and many of them in theme and treatment are similar to the verse of Lampman and Roberts.... And there are strong evidences in Mair's work that he influenced these poets to a great extent."

Mair published Tecumseh, a historical drama mainly in blank verse dealing with the War of 1812, in 1886. The Dictionary of Canadian Biography calls Tecumseh "a major contribution to our 19th-century literary heritage, wherein the War of 1812 is the central event of Canadian history. Among the many literary treatments of this war...Tecumseh stands as the most accomplished."

Canadian critic Alan Filewood praises Mair's treatment of issues on the path to mature Canadian nationhood, using General Isaac Brock to represent the responsibility to the monarchy and progress, and the Indian chieftain Tecumseh to represent the responsibility to nature and the environment. Similarly, Dennis Duffy, writing in The Canadian Encyclopedia, calls Mair's writing "pedestrian and untheatrical", but it stresses the importance of Mair's vision of Canada as "a co-operative enterprise in contrast with the self-seeking individualism of the United States."

== Recognition ==
Mair was elected a Fellow of the Royal Society of Canada in 1889.

In 1937 he was designated a Person of National Historic Significance.

== Publications ==
- Dreamland and Other Poems. London: S. Low, 1868. Montreal: Dawson, 1868,
- Tecumseh. Toronto: Hunter, Rose & Co., 1886. London: Chapman & Hall, 1886.
- Through the Mackenzie Basin: A Narrative of the Athabasca and Peace River Treaty Expedition of 1899 . London: Simpkin, Marshall, Hamilton, Kent & Co., 1903.
