= European Parliament Former Members Association =

The European Parliament Former Members Association is an Association of former members of the European Parliament, involved in promoting the European Parliament and the European Union, as well as election monitoring, among other activities.

== History ==
The European Parliament Former Members Association (commonly known as the Former Members Association, or the FMA), was established in 2001, with assistance and support from the European Parliament. The roles of the organization include the promotion of the European Parliament and the European Union, which activities are generally carried out with the support of the European Commission, universities and other organizations.

A major initiative of the Former Members Association was that of co-founding the International Election Monitors Institute, in 2006. Other co-founding member associations were the Canadian Association of Former Parliamentarians and the United States Association of Former Members of Congress.

The Association also conducts the "EP to Campus" program, which was initiated in 2006. Universities can apply to the program, which enables the university to benefit from the expertise of a former Member of the European Parliament. The former Member of the European Parliament typically spends a week at the host university, as a resource person contributing to knowledge of the European Union and the European Parliament.
