= Alexander Begg =

Alexander Begg may refer to:

- Alexander Begg (1825–1905), Scottish-Canadian teacher, civil servant and journalist
- Alexander Begg (1839–1897), Canadian journalist and businessman
- Alexander Charles Begg (1912–1991), New Zealand paediatrician
