= Colin H. Campbell =

Canadian politician (1859–1914)

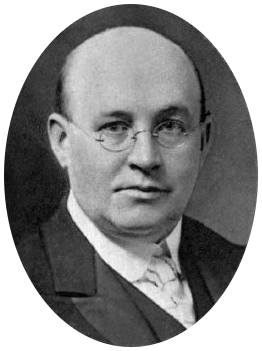

Member of the Legislative Assembly of Manitoba for Morris
- In office 1899–1914
- Preceded by: Stewart Mulvey
- Succeeded by: Jacques Parent

Personal details
- Born: 25 December 1859 Burlington, Canada West
- Died: 24 October 1914 (aged 54) Winnipeg, Manitoba
- Party: Conservative
- Relations: Minnie Julia Beatrice Campbell (wife)
- Children: Colin and Elizabeth

Colin H. Campbell (25 December 1859 – October 24, 1914) was a politician in Manitoba, Canada. He served in the Legislative Assembly of Manitoba as a Conservative from 1899 to 1914, and was a cabinet minister in the governments of Hugh John Macdonald and Rodmond Roblin.

Campbell was a barrister, and ran a practice in Winnipeg. He first ran for the Manitoba legislature in the 1892 provincial election, and lost to Liberal Peter McIntyre by 280 votes in Winnipeg North.

He sought election to the House of Commons of Canada in November 1893, as a candidate of the Conservative Party of Canada. Campbell stood in by-election for the riding of Winnipeg, after Hugh John Macdonald's resignation from the house. He lost to Liberal candidate Joseph Martin.

Campbell was first elected to the Manitoba legislature in the 1899 election, defeating Liberal incumbent Stewart Mulvey by 188 votes in the constituency of Morris. The Conservatives won the election, and Campbell was named as a minister without portfolio in Macdonald's government on January 10, 1900. He was promoted to Attorney General on October 9 of the same year.

In this period of Canadian history, newly appointed ministers were required to resign their legislative seats to seek a new mandate from their electors. These by-elections were usually mere formalities, and many ministers were returned without opposition. Campbell faced a challenge from Liberal Matthew Laurie, and defeated him by 278 votes on October 29, 1900. This by-election occurred on the same day that Roblin replaced Macdonald as premier. The new premier kept Campbell as his attorney general, and also appointed him as municipal commissioner from October 29 to December 20, 1900.

Campbell was re-elected in the elections of 1903, 1907 and 1910, retaining his seat in 1907 by a single vote. He was named minister of education and municipal commissioner on October 11, 1911. He was later appointed minister of public works. After Robert Rogers left the provincial legislature for federal politics, Campbell was seen as the second most important minister in Roblin's government.

Campbell was stricken by a severe illness on February 15, 1913, the same day that the provincial legislature was scheduled to open. He traveled to Kingston, Jamaica to recover, but was afflicted with paralysis almost immediately after arriving. He resigned his ministry on November 3, 1913, and did not stand in the 1914 election.

After unsuccessfully seeking medical care in the United States of America, Europe and Egypt, Campbell returned to Manitoba in summer 1914. He died shortly thereafter, at age 54.
