= Mavis Taillieu =

Canadian politician

Member of the Legislative Assembly of Manitoba for Morris
- In office June 3, 2003 – February 12, 2013
- Preceded by: Frank Pitura
- Succeeded by: Shannon Martin

Personal details
- Born: August 8, 1952 (age 74)
- Party: Progressive Conservative
- Education: University of Winnipeg (BA)

Mavis Taillieu (born August 8, 1952) is a former politician in Manitoba, Canada. She was a member of the Manitoba legislature from 2003 to 2013, representing the opposition Progressive Conservative Party and served as the critic of Culture, Heritage and Tourism, Family Services and Housing, Immigration and Multiculturalism, Advanced education and Literacy, and Infrastructure and Transportation. She also was opposition house leader and caucus whip.

Taillieu holds a Bachelor of Arts degree from the University of Winnipeg. Before entering public life she was a Registered Laboratory Technologist, and worked in the health care field for fifteen years. Taillieu has also been a successful entrepreneur. She was the founder of the Headingley Headliner, a local newspaper covering developments in Headingley, Manitoba, where she still resides. In 1996, she received a Community Development Award for her work with this newspaper.

In the 2003 election, Taillieu was elected to the provincial legislature for the rural riding of Morris, located to the immediate southwest of Winnipeg. This riding is considered safe for the Progressive Conservatives; Taillieu was elected with over 57% of the popular vote, despite the party's poor showing in other parts of the province.

In 2003, she criticized the provincial government's funding of a controversial display by Aliza Amihude.

In the federal election of 2004, Taillieu campaigned on behalf of Conservative Party of Canada candidate Steven Fletcher. She was re-elected in the 2007 and 2011 provincial elections.

Taillieu resigned her seat on February 12, 2013, citing family and health reasons.
