= John C. Dryden =

Canadian politician (1893–1951)

John Cameron Dryden (February 3, 1893 near Ste. Agathe, Manitoba – October 15, 1951) was a politician in Manitoba, Canada. He served in the Legislative Assembly of Manitoba from 1941 to 1949, and was a cabinet minister in the governments of Stuart Garson and Douglas Campbell.

Dryden was educated at the Manitoba Agricultural College, and worked as a farmer. He served for ten years on the municipal council of Ste. Agathe, and served overseas in World War I from 1915 to 1918 as a member of the Royal Canadian Engineers. Dryden received a military medal in 1917. In 1919, he married Luella Mary Kemp.

He was first elected to the Manitoba legislature in the 1941 provincial election, defeating Liberal-Progressive candidate L.A. Slater in the rural constituency of Morris. Although elected as an independent, Dryden was a supporter of the coalition government led by Liberal-Progressive Premier John Bracken. He joined the Liberal-Progressive Party himself during the parliament which followed.

Dryden was appointed to Stuart Garson's cabinet on February 4, 1944, as Minister of Education. Returned without difficulty in the 1945 election, he held this position until December 14, 1948, while he was promoted to Provincial Treasurer by Garson's replacement, Douglas Lloyd Campbell.

Dryden was defeated in the 1949 provincial election by Harry Shewman, an independent candidate. He remained as a caretaker Provincial Treasurer until February 16, 1950, when he resigned his office. He did not seek a return to the legislature, and died in Winnipeg at the age of 58.

In the early 2000s, his nephew Murray Dryden's son, Ken Dryden, was appointed by Prime Minister Paul Martin to the federal cabinet as Minister of Social Development.

== Electoral results ==
1941 Manitoba general election: Morris
Party	Candidate	Votes	%	±%
Independent	John C. Dryden	1,708	59.37	–
Liberal–Progressive	Leo Arthur Slater	1,169	40.63	-11.65
Total valid votes		2,877	–	–
Rejected		32	–	
Eligible voters / Turnout		5,574	52.19	-20.71
Source(s) Source: Manitoba. Chief Electoral Officer (1999). Statement of Votes for the 37th Provincial General Election, September 21, 1999 (PDF) (Report). Winnipeg: Elections Manitoba.

1945 Manitoba general election: Morris
Party	Candidate	Votes	%	±%
Liberal–Progressive	John C. Dryden	1,676	70.13	29.49
Co-operative Commonwealth	Ivan Langtry	714	29.87	–
Total valid votes		2,390	–	–
Rejected		62	–	
Eligible voters / Turnout		5,697	43.04	-9.15
Source(s) Source: Manitoba. Chief Electoral Officer (1999). Statement of Votes for the 37th Provincial General Election, September 21, 1999 (PDF) (Report). Winnipeg: Elections Manitoba.

1949 Manitoba general election: Morris
Party	Candidate	Votes	%	±%
Independent	Harry Shewman	1,452	47.76	–
Liberal–Progressive	John C. Dryden	1,253	41.22	-28.91
Co-operative Commonwealth	Thomas Wishart	335	11.02	-18.85
Total valid votes		3,040	–	–
Rejected		99	–	
Eligible voters / Turnout		5,953	52.73	9.69
Source(s) Source: Manitoba. Chief Electoral Officer (1999). Statement of Votes for the 37th Provincial General Election, September 21, 1999 (PDF) (Report). Winnipeg: Elections Manitoba.
