= Frank Pitura =

Canadian politician (1943–2019)

Franklin Paul Pitura (October 24, 1943 – February 16, 2019) was a politician in Manitoba, Canada. He was a member of the Manitoba legislature from 1995 to 2003, representing the rural riding of Morris for the Progressive Conservative Party. Between 1997 and 1999, he served as a Cabinet Minister in the government of Premier Gary Filmon.

The son of Frank Pitura and Doris Palahniuk, he was born in Winnipeg, Manitoba, and was educated at Sanford Collegiate and the University of Manitoba. He was a government employee from 1967 to 1977, and again from 1987 to 1995. Pitura also worked as a farmer from 1977 to 1991, and was a delegate of the Manitoba Pool Elevators organization at one stage. In 1967, he married Evelyn Diehl.

The riding of Morris is generally considered safe for the Progressive Conservatives, and Pitura was elected without difficulty in the provincial election of 1995, defeating his nearest opponent (Liberal Bill Roth) by over 3000 votes. Shortly after his election, Pitura announced his opposition to the Canadian Wheat Board's monopoly status, and his support for dual marketing (though there was little he or the Filmon government could do to mandate such a change).

On January 6, 1997, Pitura was appointed acting Minister of Government Services, probably in reflection of his previous work as a government employee. In 1998, Pitura and federal Cabinet Minister Ron Duhamel announced the construction of a flood protection dike at Ste. Agathe, as a response to serious flooding the previous year.

Pitura was re-elected in Morris in the provincial election of 1999, although the Progressive Conservatives were defeated at the provincial level. After four years on the opposition benches, Pitura announced his retirement from politics shortly before the provincial election of 2003. Pitura died on February 16, 2019, aged 75.
