= Selkirk (federal electoral district) =

Former federal electoral district in Manitoba, Canada

Selkirk was a federal electoral district in Manitoba, Canada, that was represented in the House of Commons of Canada from 1871 to 1979.

This riding was created in 1871 when the province of Manitoba was created. It was abolished in 1976 when it was redistributed into Selkirk—Interlake and Winnipeg—Birds Hill ridings. It was recreated in 1987 from parts Selkirk—Interlake, Winnipeg North Centre and Winnipeg—Birds Hill ridings. For information about that riding, see Selkirk—Red River. This new incarnation was renamed in 1990 to Selkirk—Red River and abolished in 1996.

== Election results ==
=== 1871–1882 ===
By-election: On Manitoba joining Confederation, 15 July 1870

By-election on 2 March 1871
Party	Candidate	Votes
Independent Conservative	SMITH, Donald Alexander	239
Unknown	TAYLOR, John	103

1872 Canadian federal election
Party	Candidate	Votes
Independent Conservative	SMITH, Donald A.	258
Unknown	WILSON, A.E.	62
Unknown	MULVEY, S.	0
Unknown	SUTHERLAND, J.	0

1874 Canadian federal election
Party	Candidate	Votes
Independent Conservative	SMITH, Donald A.	329
Liberal	BANNATYNE, A.G.B.	225

1878 Canadian federal election
Party	Candidate	Votes
Independent Conservative	SMITH, Donald A.	555
Conservative	MORRIS, Hon. A.	546

By-election: On election being declared void

By-election on 10 September 1880
Party	Candidate	Votes
Conservative	SCOTT, Thomas	735
Independent Conservative	SMITH, Donald A.	577

=== 1882–1896 ===
During this time, the riding was moved from being in the Winnipeg area to the southwestern corner of the province.

1882 Canadian federal election
Party	Candidate	Votes
Liberal	Hugh McKay Sutherland	1,487
Conservative	Stewart Mulvey	1,064

1887 Canadian federal election
Party	Candidate	Votes
Liberal–Conservative	DALY, Thomas Mayne	2,787
Liberal	CHRISTIE, J.A.	2,608

1891 Canadian federal election
Party	Candidate	Votes
Liberal–Conservative	DALY, T.M.	3,660
Liberal	MARTIN, Joseph	3,225

By-election: On Mr. Daly being appointed Minister of the Interior and Superintendent General of Indian Affairs

By-election on 2 November 1892
Party	Candidate	Votes
Liberal–Conservative	DALY, Thomas Mayne	acclaimed

=== 1896–1974 ===
Selkirk was moved out of the southwest, to the area north of Winnipeg.

1896 Canadian federal election
Party	Candidate	Votes
Liberal	MACDONELL, John A.	1,713
Conservative	ARMSTRONG, Hugh	1,712

1900 Canadian federal election
Party	Candidate	Votes
Liberal	MCCREARY, William Forsythe	2,172
Conservative	HASLAM, John Heber	2,171

1904 Canadian federal election
Party	Candidate	Votes
Liberal	JACKSON, S.J.	2,104
Conservative	COLEMAN, W.W.	1,607

1908 Canadian federal election
Party	Candidate	Votes
Conservative	BRADBURY, George Henry	2,874
Liberal	JACKSON, Samuel Jacob	2,776

1911 Canadian federal election
Party	Candidate	Votes
Conservative	BRADBURY, George Henry	3,098
Liberal	BREDIN, Albert Ryerson	3,011
Independent	HOLOWACKY, Wasil	234

1917 Canadian federal election
Party	Candidate	Votes
Government (Unionist)	HAY, Thomas	5,860
Opposition (Laurier Liberals)	ADAMSON, John Evans	3,045

1921 Canadian federal election
Party	Candidate	Votes
Progressive	BANCROFT, Leland Payson	6,529
Independent	ADAMSON, John Evans	3,315
Conservative	HAY, Thomas	2,347
Labour	DUNN, Thomas	1,425
Liberal	JOHANNESSON, Sigurdur Julius	1,239

1925 Canadian federal election
Party	Candidate	Votes
Conservative	HANNESSON, Hannes Marino	3,831
Liberal–Progressive	BANCROFT, Leland Payson	3,319
Liberal	GIBBS, Walter Henry Gabriel	2,524

1926 Canadian federal election
Party	Candidate	Votes
Liberal–Progressive	BANCROFT, Leland Payson	7,016
Conservative	HANNESSON, Hannes Marino	5,104

1930 Canadian federal election
Party	Candidate	Votes
Conservative	STITT, James Herbert	6,581
Liberal–Progressive	BANCROFT, Leland Payson	6,098
Communist	NAWIZOWSKY, John	1,709

1935 Canadian federal election
Party	Candidate	Votes
Liberal–Progressive	THORSON, Joseph T.	9,230
Conservative	THORVALDSON, Gunnar S.	4,098
Communist	NAWIZOWSKY, John	1,953
Co-operative Commonwealth	LANGTON, Wenman	1,633
Reconstruction	GORDON, William Earl	1,275
Social Credit	MILLS, Edward Robert Rufus	1,273

1940 Canadian federal election
Party	Candidate	Votes
Liberal	THORSON, Joseph T.	11,023
Co-operative Commonwealth	WISE, Richard Ambrose	6,869
National Government	PARTRIDGE, Edmund	3,890

By-election: On Mr. Thorson's acceptance of an office of emolument under the Crown, 6 October 1942

By-election on 9 August 1943
Party	Candidate	Votes
Co-operative Commonwealth	BRYCE, William	9,396
Liberal	FILLMORE, Charles Elwyn	3,781
Social Credit	HALLDORSON, Salome	833

1945 Canadian federal election
Party	Candidate	Votes
Co-operative Commonwealth	BRYCE, William	7,556
Liberal	WOOD, Robert James	6,448
Progressive Conservative	DE PENCIER, Charles Edwin	3,499
Labor–Progressive	HRYNCHYSHYN, Nick	1,978
Social Credit	BROKOVSKI, Theodore William	1,197

1949 Canadian federal election
Party	Candidate	Votes
Co-operative Commonwealth	BRYCE, William	7,819
Liberal	RÉGNIER, Laurier Arthur	7,593
Progressive Conservative	MCDOWELL, John	6,158

1953 Canadian federal election
Party	Candidate	Votes
Liberal	WOOD, Robert James	6,265
Co-operative Commonwealth	BRYCE, W. Scottie	6,076
Progressive Conservative	BARYLUK, Mike	898
Social Credit	YANCHYSHYN, Walter	586
Labor–Progressive	KOSTANIUK, Constantine	307
Independent	GRIFFIN, Walter John	141

By-election: On Mr. Wood's death, 8 August 1954

By-election on 8 November 1954
Party	Candidate	Votes
Co-operative Commonwealth	BRYCE, W. Scottie	8,462
Liberal	SHANSKI, John	5,715
Progressive Conservative	VEITCH, David B.	2,471

1957 Canadian federal election
Party	Candidate	Votes
Co-operative Commonwealth	BRYCE, W. Scottie	7,432
Liberal	WOOD, William James	5,530
Progressive Conservative	SETTER, Ernest	2,107
Social Credit	LUINING, Frederik Louis	1,796

1958 Canadian federal election
Party	Candidate	Votes
Progressive Conservative	STEFANSON, Eric	8,878
Co-operative Commonwealth	BRYCE, W. Scottie	5,291
Liberal	WOOD, William James	4,467

1962 Canadian federal election
Party	Candidate	Votes
Progressive Conservative	STEFANSON, Eric	8,797
Liberal	MCMILLAN, J. Crawford	6,272
New Democratic	ARNASON, Valdimar M.	4,198
Social Credit	TERGESEN, Terence P.J.	920

1963 Canadian federal election
Party	Candidate	Votes
Progressive Conservative	STEFANSON, Eric	10,096
Liberal	USICK, Rudy E.	6,937
New Democratic	CROMARTY, Raymond	2,211
Social Credit	HOLLBORN, Carl E.	718

1965 Canadian federal election
Party	Candidate	Votes
Progressive Conservative	STEFANSON, Eric	8,573
Liberal	GARSON, Graeme	4,765
New Democratic	PAWLEY, Howard Russell	4,456
Social Credit	EPPS, Rodger	678

1968 Canadian federal election
Party	Candidate	Votes	%
New Democratic	Edward Richard Schreyer	17,310	44.59
Liberal	Bernie Wolfe	12,020	30.97
Progressive Conservative	Eric Stefanson	8,781	22.62
Social Credit	Walter Bowden	707	1.82
Total valid votes		38,818	

Canadian federal by-election, April 13, 1970 Resignation of Ed Schreyer
Party	Candidate	Votes	%	±%
New Democratic	Douglas Charles Rowland	16,595	56.80	+12.20
Liberal	Phil Reimer	6,947	23.78	-7.19
Progressive Conservative	Vera Enns	4,993	17.09	-5.53
Social Credit	Bob Luining	541	1.85	+0.03
Independent	Travis I. Fitch	143	0.49	
Total valid votes		29,219		
New Democratic hold		Swing		+9.70

1972 Canadian federal election
Party	Candidate	Votes	%	±%
New Democratic	Douglas Charles Rowland	17,872	39.86	-16.94
Progressive Conservative	Dean Waldon Whiteway	17,842	39.79	+22.70
Liberal	Svein Sigfusson	8,709	19.42	-4.35
Social Credit	Robert Luining	418	0.93	-0.92
Total valid votes		44,841		
New Democratic hold		Swing		-19.82

1974 Canadian federal election
Party	Candidate	Votes	%	±%
Progressive Conservative	Dean Waldon Whiteway	22,441	44.44	+4.65
New Democratic	Douglas Charles Rowland	20,667	40.93	+1.07
Liberal	Eddie Coutu	7,239	14.34	-5.09
Marxist–Leninist	Bill Kalturnyk	148	0.29	
Total valid votes		50,495		
Progressive Conservative gain from New Democratic		Swing		+1.79

== See also ==
- List of Canadian electoral districts
- Historical federal electoral districts of Canada
