= Leland Payson Bancroft =

Canadian politician (1880–1951)

Member of Parliament for Selkirk
- In office 1921–1925
- Preceded by: Thomas Hay
- Succeeded by: Hannes Marino Hannesson
- In office 1926–1930
- Preceded by: Hannes Marino Hannesson
- Succeeded by: James Herbert Stitt

Personal details
- Born: August 6, 1880 Walton, Nova Scotia, Canada
- Died: February 27, 1951 (aged 70) Vancouver, British Columbia
- Party: Progressive Party
- Profession: farmer

Leland Payson Bancroft (August 6, 1880 – February 27, 1951) was a Canadian politician. He was elected to the House of Commons of Canada in 1921 as a Member of the Progressive Party for the riding of Selkirk. He was defeated in 1925 as a Liberal-Progressive, but, won in 1926 and was defeated again in 1930. He died in Vancouver in 1951.
