= McPhillips (electoral district) =

Provincial electoral district in Manitoba, Canada

Manitoba electoral district
- Location in Winnipeg

Provincial electoral district
- Legislature: Legislative Assembly of Manitoba
MLA
Jasdeep Devgan
New Democratic
- District created: 2018
- First contested: 2019
- Last contested: 2023

Demographics
- Population (2016): 22,240
- Electors (2019): 15,643
- Area (km²): 108
- Pop. density (per km²): 205.9
- Census division(s): Division No. 11, Division No. 13
- Census subdivision(s): West St. Paul, Winnipeg

McPhillips is a provincial electoral district of Manitoba, Canada, that came into effect at the 2019 Manitoba general election. It elects one member to the Legislative Assembly of Manitoba.

The riding was created by the 2018 provincial electoral redistribution out of parts of St. Paul, The Maples, and Kildonan.

The riding contains the Rural Municipality of West St. Paul and the Winnipeg neighbourhoods of Garden City, Leila North, Templeton-Sinclair, Margaret Park, and a small part of Robertson.

The riding is named for Winnipeg Route 180 (locally called McPhillips Street), a major thoroughfare that links the Winnipeg and West St. Paul parts of the riding.

== Members of the Legislative Assembly ==
Assembly	Years	Member	Party
42nd	2019–2023	Shannon Martin	Progressive Conservative
43rd	2023–present	Jasdeep Devgan	New Democratic

== Election results ==
2023 Manitoba general election
Party	Candidate	Votes	%	±%	Expenditures
New Democratic	Jasdeep Devgan	4,905	47.30	+10.10	$19,801.81
Progressive Conservative	Sheilah Restall	4,580	44.16	+5.97	$23,024.47
Liberal	Umar Hayat	886	8.54	-8.58	$1,307.39
Total valid votes/expense limit		10,371	99.11	–	$74,674.00
Total rejected and declined ballots		93	0.89	–	
Turnout		10,464	54.61	-2.03	
Eligible voters		19,162			
New Democratic gain from Progressive Conservative		Swing		+2.07	
Source(s) Source: Elections Manitoba

2019 Manitoba general election
Party	Candidate	Votes	%	±%	Expenditures
Progressive Conservative	Shannon Martin	3,359	38.19	-9.5	$27,158.77
New Democratic	Greg McFarlane	3,271	37.19	+3.2	$11,518.32
Liberal	John Cacayuran	1,506	17.12	+4.3	$10,011.14
Green	Jason Smith	414	4.71	+0.2	$0.00
Manitoba First	Dave Wheeler	245	2.79	+1.8 (Note: Change compared to Manitoba Party)	$1,210.90
Total valid votes		8,795	99.27		
Total rejected ballots		65	0.73		
Turnout		8,860	56.64		
Eligible voters		15,643			
Progressive Conservative hold		Swing		-6.3	
Source: STATEMENT OF OFFICIAL RESULTS BY VOTING AREA (PDF) (Report). Elections Manitoba. 2019.

2016 provincial election redistributed results
Party	%
Progressive Conservative	47.7
New Democratic	34.0
Liberal	12.8
Green	4.5
Manitoba	1.0

== See also ==
- List of Manitoba provincial electoral districts
- Canadian provincial electoral districts
