= Jasdeep Devgan =

Canadian politician

Jasdeep Devgan MLA

Member of the Legislative Assembly of Manitoba for McPhillips
- Incumbent
- Assumed office October 3, 2023
- Preceded by: Shannon Martin

Personal details
- Born: Winnipeg, Manitoba, Canada
- Party: New Democratic
- Education: University of Manitoba (BA)

Jasdeep "JD" Devgan is a Canadian politician, who was elected to the Legislative Assembly of Manitoba in the 2023 Manitoba general election. He represents the district of McPhillips as a member of the Manitoba New Democratic Party.

Prior to being elected, Devgan served as the vice president of the Sikh Society of Manitoba, and was the director of government and community engagement at the University of Manitoba. The University of Manitoba is also where he attended university.

== Electoral history ==
2023 Manitoba general election: McPhillips
Party	Candidate	Votes	%	±%	Expenditures
New Democratic	Jasdeep Devgan	4,905	47.30	+10.10	$19,801.81
Progressive Conservative	Sheilah Restall	4,580	44.16	+5.97	$23,024.47
Liberal	Umar Hayat	886	8.54	-8.58	$1,307.39
Total valid votes/expense limit		10,371	99.11	–	$74,674.00
Total rejected and declined ballots		93	0.89	–	
Turnout		10,464	54.61	-2.03	
Eligible voters		19,162			
New Democratic gain from Progressive Conservative		Swing		+2.07	
Source(s) Source: Elections Manitoba
