= Harry Shewman =

Canadian politician

Harold Proctor Shewman (April 14, 1900 in Winnipeg, Manitoba – July 13, 1968) was a politician in Manitoba, Canada. He served as a member of the Legislative Assembly of Manitoba from 1949 until his death in 1968.

Shewman was educated at Wellington School in Winnipeg. He moved to Morris with his family in 1915. He was a partner in his father's construction business and later worked as an auctioneer and insurance agent. He was a school trustee from 1925 to 1938, and served as mayor of the Town of Morris from 1948 to 1954, coinciding with his early period in the legislature.

Shewman was first elected to the Manitoba legislature in the 1949 provincial election. At that time, Manitoba was governed by a coalition of the province's Liberal-Progressives (commonly called Liberals) and Progressive Conservatives. Shewman ran as an independent candidate in Morris, and defeated coalitionist John C. Dryden by 153 votes. Shewman was initially identified as a coalition supporter, but had turned to the opposition side by 1950.

In 1950, Shewman called on Premier Douglas Campbell to declare a state of emergency over rising flood waters. Campbell delayed, which resulted in a number of municipalities being left ineligible for federal relief.

Shewman was re-elected in the 1953 general election, again as an independent. He was not opposed by the Progressive Conservatives (who left the coalition government 1950), and seems to have been at least tacitly supported by that party. He formally joined the Progressive Conservatives in 1954, after Dufferin Roblin was chosen as the party's leader.

The Progressive Conservatives made significant gains in the 1958 provincial election, and formed a minority government after the vote. Shewman was easily re-elected under the PC banner, and was again returned without difficulty in the elections of 1959 and 1962. In the 1966 election, he defeated Liberal Bruce McKenzie by the reduced margin of 230 votes.

He served on the backbenches throughout his time in parliament, and was never appointed to a cabinet position.

Shewman died in 1968. The Morris constituency has remained in Progressive Conservative hands since this time.
