= Hannes Marino Hannesson =

Canadian politician

Colonel Hannes Marino Hannesson
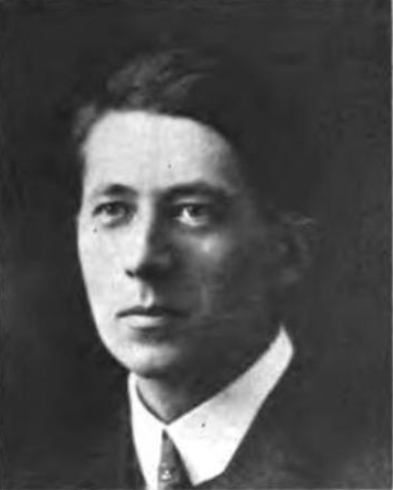

Member of the Canadian Parliament for Selkirk
- In office 1925–1926
- Preceded by: Leland Payson Bancroft
- Succeeded by: Leland Payson Bancroft

Personal details
- Born: November 27, 1884 Eyjafjörður, Iceland
- Died: July 11, 1958 (aged 73) Victoria, British Columbia, Canada
- Party: Conservative
- Spouse: Kristrún Johnson
- Children: Betty Hannesson, Richard Hannesson, Barbara Smythe, Petie N Deveer
- Occupation: Lawyer, soldier

Hannes Marino Hannesson (November 27, 1884 – June 11, 1958) was an Icelandic-Canadian lawyer and a Member of Parliament for Manitoba.

== Early life ==
He was born in Eyjafjörður in Iceland to Hannes Hannesson and Pálína Þórdís Anna Jóhannesdóttir. He immigrated with his family to Canada and settled in Winnipeg, Manitoba in 1886 where he was schooled. He attended the University of Manitoba and trained as a lawyer, being called to the Manitoba bar in 1905 and practiced law in Winnipeg and Selkirk, Manitoba.

== World War II ==
During World War I, Hannesson joined the Canadian Expeditionary Force and saw action in France. He was promoted to lieutenant in 1916, captain and then major in 1916 and then lieutenant-colonel in 1917.

== Later life ==
He was the vice-president of the Winnipeg Falcons when they won gold at the 1920 Summer Olympics.

He entered politics after the war and was elected to the House of Commons of Canada as a Conservative MP for Selkirk defeating Liberal-Progressive MP Leland Payson Bancroft. The election returned a minority parliament and Hannenson was defeated by Bancroft a year later in the 1926 federal election and returned to private life. He died in Victoria, British Columbia in 1958 at the age of 73.
