= International Election Monitors Institute =

The International Election Monitors Institute is an association of former Members of the United States Congress (Senate and House of Representatives), the Canadian Parliament and the European Parliament, "to provide former legislators as election observers to operate worldwide in collaboration with other democracy-building organizations".

== History ==
The International Election Monitors Institute contributes to election monitoring, particularly in emerging democracies. The Institute was established in June, 2006, as a joint project of the Canadian Association of Former Parliamentarians, the United States Association of Former Members of Congress, and the European Parliament Former Members Association. The initial goal was to "establish and operate an International Election Monitors Institute, which manages a dedicated and professional program to recruit, train, and arrange for the deployment of former parliamentarians from the three organizations". In addition to election monitoring, a goal of the Institute is to "work with governmental and non-governmental partners on post-election democracy-building endeavours, in countries where the Institute has observed elections". The Institute works with other monitoring organizations, including the Organization for Security and Cooperation in Europe and the Carter Center. The Institute has offices in Washington, Brussels and Ottawa, and has endorsed the Declaration of Principles for International Election Observation.
