= Shannon Martin =

Canadian politician (born 1970s)

Member of the Legislative Assembly of Manitoba
- In office September 10, 2019 – September 5, 2023
- Preceded by: first member
- Succeeded by: Jasdeep Devgan
- Constituency: McPhillips
- In office January 28, 2014 – August 12, 2019
- Preceded by: Mavis Taillieu
- Succeeded by: Riding Abolished
- Constituency: Morris

Personal details
- Born: c. 1970-1971
- Party: Progressive Conservative

Shannon Martin (born 1970 or 1971) is a Canadian politician, who was elected to the Manitoba Legislative Assembly in a by-election on January 28, 2014. He represents the electoral district of McPhillips as a member of the Progressive Conservative Party of Manitoba.

Martin first ran as a Progressive Conservative candidate in the 1999 Manitoba provincial election, in the Winnipeg division of Kildonan. He was defeated by Dave Chomiak of the New Democratic Party.

Prior to his election to the legislature, Martin was executive director of Reaching E-Quality Employment Services, a Winnipeg-based not-for-profit that assists persons with disabilities find employment. He was also provincial director of the Canadian Federation of Independent Business.

He was re-elected in the 2016 and 2019 provincial elections.

== Electoral record ==
2019 Manitoba general election: McPhillips
Party	Candidate	Votes	%	±%	Expenditures
Progressive Conservative	Shannon Martin	3,359	38.19	-9.5	$27,158.77
New Democratic	Greg McFarlane	3,271	37.19	+3.2	$11,518.32
Liberal	John Cacayuran	1,506	17.12	+4.3	$10,011.14
Green	Jason Smith	414	4.71	+0.2	$0.00
Manitoba First	Dave Wheeler	245	2.79	+1.8 (Note: Change compared to Manitoba Party)	$1,210.90
Total valid votes		8,795	99.27		
Total rejected ballots		65	0.73		
Turnout		8,860	56.64		
Eligible voters		15,643			
Progressive Conservative hold		Swing		-6.3	
Source: STATEMENT OF OFFICIAL RESULTS BY VOTING AREA (PDF) (Report). Elections Manitoba. 2019.

2016 Manitoba general election: Morris
Party	Candidate	Votes	%	±%
Progressive Conservative	Shannon Martin	6,980	75.45	+5.46
Liberal	John Falk	1,430	15.45	+4.27
New Democratic	Mohamed Alli	840	9.08	-3.85
Total valid votes		9,250	100.0	
Eligible voters		15,991		
Source: Elections Manitoba

Manitoba provincial by-election, January 28, 2014: Morris
Party	Candidate	Votes	%	±%	Expenditures
Progressive Conservative	Shannon Martin	2,642	69.99	-4.01	
New Democratic	Dean Harder	488	12.93	-6.44	
Liberal	Jeremy Barber	422	11.18	+4.55	
Independent	Ray Shaw	138	3.66	-	
Green	Alain Landry	85	2.25	-	
Total valid votes		3775			
Rejected and declined votes		17			
Turnout		3792	27.51		
Electors on the lists		13782			
Progressive Conservative hold		Swing		+1.21	

1999 Manitoba general election: Kildonan
Party	Candidate	Votes	%	±%	Expenditures
New Democratic	Dave Chomiak	6,101	62.66	10.66	$16,574.00
Progressive Conservative	Shannon Martin	2,542	26.11	-3.63	$14,834.13
Liberal	Michael Lazar	1,093	11.23	-7.03	$7,835.59
Total valid votes		9,736	–	–	
Rejected		54	–		
Eligible voters / turnout		13,818	70.85	-3.44	
Source(s) Source: Manitoba. Chief Electoral Officer (1999). Statement of Votes for the 37th Provincial General Election, September 21, 1999 (PDF) (Report). Winnipeg: Elections Manitoba.
