= Henry Tennant (Canadian politician) =

Canadian politician

Henry James Tennant (July 2, 1839 – November 3, 1913) was a political figure in Manitoba. He represented Morris from 1883 to 1886 in the Legislative Assembly of Manitoba as a Conservative.

He was born in Poonamallee, Madras, India and served in the British Army for 25 years. Tennant fought in India and also served at the Siege of Sevastopol during the Crimean War. He retired on a military pension and came to Canada during the 1860s. He was named clerk of the county court in Emerson in 1880. In 1886, Tennant was provincial immigration agent at Emerson. He served as mayor of West Lynne in 1888.

Tennant was married twice: first to a Miss Keenan and then, in 1869, to Nora O'Connell. He died at Coutts, Alberta in 1913.
