= Clayton Manness =

Canadian politician

Clayton Sidney Manness (born January 23, 1947) is a Manitoba politician. He served in the Legislative Assembly of Manitoba from 1981 to 1995. In 1983, he was an unsuccessful candidate for the leadership of the Progressive Conservative Party of Manitoba.

The son of Sidney Alfred Manness and Helen Julia Kosier, he was born in Winnipeg, Manitoba, and was educated at the University of Manitoba. He worked as a farmer before entering public life. In 1968, he married Cheryl Louise Reinsch. Manness served as President of the provincial Progressive Conservative Association in the early 1970s, and supported Sterling Lyon over Sidney Spivak in the divisive leadership challenge of 1975.

Manness was first elected to the Legislative Assembly of Manitoba in 1981, easily defeating Peter Francis of the New Democratic Party in the rural riding of Morris. Two years later, he ran for the leadership of the Progressive Conservative party against Gary Filmon and Brian Ransom.

Manness was regarded as the most right-wing of the three candidates. After he was eliminated on the first ballot, however, his supporters divided almost evenly between the more conservative Ransom and the more progressive Filmon. Subsequently, Ransom's supporters would allege that Filmon's team had encouraged Manness to run as a means of splitting the right-wing vote.

Manness was re-elected without difficulty in 1986, 1988 and 1990. When Filmon's Tories formed government in 1988, he was appointed Minister of Finance and Government House Leader. Following a 1993 cabinet shuffle, he became Minister of Education and Training. In this capacity, he presided over a re-evaluation of funding methods for the public system which resulted in government cutbacks.

Manness did not run for re-election in 1995. He later became co-President of the Canadian Alliance, and attempted to keep the party united during the controversies over Stockwell Day's leadership in 2002. In 2004, he campaigned for the Conservative Party of Canada.

Manness has also formed an organization called "Prairie Pulp and Paper Co." with actor Woody Harrelson, promoting the development of an environmentally friendly, non-wood-based pulp program in the province.
