= Minnie Julia Beatrice Campbell =

Canadian clubwoman, lecturer and editor

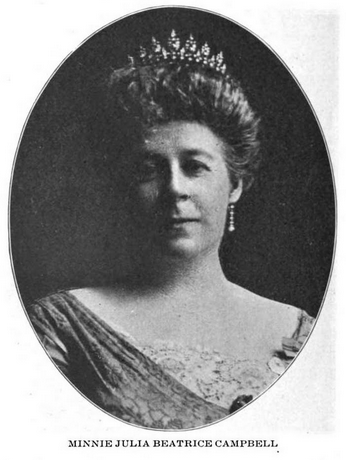
- Campbell in a 1913 publication
- Born: June 18, 1862; Palmero, Canada West
- Died: November 3, 1952 (aged 90); Thunder Bay, Ontario, Canada
- Education: Wesleyan Female College (Hamilton, Ontario)
- Occupations: Clubwoman; lecturer; editor

Minnie Julia Beatrice Campbell OBE (June 18, 1862 – November 3, 1952) was a Canadian clubwoman, lecturer, and editor, a leader in the Imperial Order Daughters of the Empire (IODE).

== Early life ==
Minnie Julia Beatrice Buck was born in Palmero, Canada West (now Oakville, Ontario), the daughter of Anson Buck and Keturah Adelaide Howell Buck. Her father was a medical doctor and local politician, and a temperance activist; because of his interests and with his support, she became the first female member of Palermo's "Sons of Temperance" in 1877. She attended the Wesleyan Female College in Hamilton, Ontario, graduating in 1880.

== Career ==
Minnie Buck taught briefly before she married in 1884 and moved to Winnipeg. In 1906 she was the editor of the women's edition of the Winnipeg Telegram newspaper, and raised funds for a YWCA in that city. She led the local chapter of the Imperial Order Daughters of the Empire (IODE), and served on the organization's provincial board for Manitoba. During World War I she turned her fundraising and organizing talents to supporting the Canadian Red Cross and other war relief causes.

Minnie Campbell was the only Manitoban to attend the coronation of Edward VII and Alexandra of Kent, representing the IODE. She was inducted into the Order of the British Empire for her community work, and awarded a Golden Cross of Merit by the Polish government for her work during World War I.

== Personal life and legacy ==
Minnie Buck married Colin H. Campbell in 1884. Her husband was a lawyer and a government minister in Manitoba. They had two children together, Colin and Elizabeth. She was widowed when Colin Campbell died in 1914. Minnie Julia Beatrice Campbell died in Thunder Bay, Ontario in 1952, aged 90 years.

The Manitoba IODE offered a Minnie J. B. Campbell Award from 1927, for excellent student achievement in Grade 11 English literature courses.
