= Alphonse-Fortunat Martin =

Canadian politician

Alphonse-Fortunat Martin (May 14, 1849 – February 1905) was a land surveyor and political figure in Manitoba. He represented Ste. Agathe from 1874 to 1879 and Morris from 1886 to 1896 in the Legislative Assembly of Manitoba as a Liberal and then as an Independent member.

He was born in Rimouski, Canada East, the son of Henri Martin and Marie-Louise Dessein, dit Saint-Pierre, and educated at the college there and the Quebec military school. From 1868 to 1870, Martin served as a Papal zouave. He qualified as a provincial land surveyor in 1871. In 1874, he married Louise Radiger. Martin was editor of Le Courrier du Nord (Ouest). He came to Manitoba in 1872 as a surveyor for the federal government and settled in West Lynn. In 1875, he was chosen to be opposition leader in the Manitoba assembly. Martin was defeated when he ran for reelection in 1879 and 1883 before being elected again in Morris. He was unsuccessful in bids for reelection in 1896 and 1899. After he retired from politics, Martin returned to surveying. He died in Winnipeg, Manitoba at the age of 55.

His brother Édouard-Onésiphore Martin served in the Quebec assembly.
