= Winnipeg General Hospital =

- Health Sciences Centre

Geography
- Location: 700 William Ave, Winnipeg, Manitoba, Canada
- Coordinates: 49°54′14.4″N 97°9′31.68″W

Organization
- Type: District, General, Teaching

Services
- Emergency department: Yes

History
- Founded: 1872

Winnipeg General Hospital is a hospital in Winnipeg, Manitoba. It was built on the estate of Andrew McDermot. The driving force behind the hospital was McDermott's daughter, Annie Bannatyne, who convinced McDermot and her husband Andrew Bannatyne to provide the land for the hospital. The hospital is part of the Health Sciences Centre, one of the largest hospitals in Canada.

== History ==
In 1882, a 20-bed hospital was built on land donated by Andrew McDermot. It was later exchanged for a larger site and the first building was constructed in 1884. Henry Sandham Griffith designed a major addition to the hospital in 1903.

In 1937, contractor William Arthur Irish added another building costing $25,000.

The hospital merged with Winnipeg Children's Hospital and Winnipeg Rehabilitation Hospitals in 1972 to become the Health Sciences Centre.

== Sources ==
- The Story of Manitoba by F. H. Schofield, Winnipeg: The S. J. Clarke Publishing Company, 1913
- Pioneers and Early Citizens of Manitoba, Winnipeg: Manitoba Library Association, 1971
