= Andrew McDermot =

Canadian fur trader (1790–1881)

Andrew McDermot (1790 – 12 October 1881) was a Hudson's Bay Company (HBC) employee who became an independent fur trade merchant and member of the Council of Assiniboia.

== McDermot's background and family relations ==
McDermot was born in Belangare Castle, Castlerea, County Roscommon, Ireland in 1790, the eldest son of Miles MacDermot, The MacDermot and Catherine (Kitty Bhan) O'Conor, an illegitimate daughter of Charles O'Conor of Belanagare. He was raised a Roman Catholic and educated at home. His father was once married to Bridget O'Conor a much older sister of his mother and after she died he married Kitty Bhan. Andrew's sister, Bridget Maria MacDermot, also daughter of Kitty Bhan, married Francis Mclaughlin, a prosperous Catholic Belfast merchant. His much older half brother was Hugh MacDermot, The MacDermot. His maternal Uncles were Denis O'Conor of Belanagare and Charles O'Conor of Mount Allen. Through his uncle Denis his cousins were Owen O'Conor, O'Conor Don (Gaelic Nobleman, first Catholic MP for County Roscommon after Catholic Emancipation), Charles O'Conor (a Catholic priest and historian, who caused controversy in his lifetime), Matthew O'Conor of Mount Druid (a historian, landowner and barrister). Through his uncle Charles he was a first cousin of Thomas O'Conor (United Irishman who fled to New York and became a journalist). Thomas was the father of Charles O'Conor of New York, the American Attorney and Bourbon Democrat Nominee to the Presidency of the United States in 1872

In Norway House, he married Sara McNab, mixed-blood daughter of Thomas McNab, another Hudson's Bay Company employee. He and Sara had 15 living children, nine daughters and six sons. Many of his daughters married prominent gentleman from Winnipeg's elite. Daughter Mary Jane married Joseph Taillefer he was a farmer, lawyer and political figure in Manitoba. He represented Ste. Agathe in 1879 and Morris from 1879 to 1883 as a Conservative. Eldest daughter Marie, born in 1816, married Richard Lane, HBC clerk; Ellen married Thomas Bird; Catherine married Thomas Truthwaite; Mary Sally married William McTavish, Governor of Red River and Assiniboia; Anne married Andrew Graham Ballenden Bannatyne, who became a partner with Andrew McDermot and became the second wealthiest man in the settlement; Harriet married Alexander Ralph Lillie, an HBC postmaster.

Though born Roman Catholic, he was married and buried by the Church of England. He is buried at St. John's Cathedral, Winnipeg.

== HBC career ==
With few opportunities in Ireland, he engaged with the Hudson's Bay Company in Sligo and arrived at York Factory on the ship Robert Taylor on August 26, 1812, initially signing on for a three-year contract. He was employed as a writer, trader and clerk in various fur trade posts in what is now north-central Manitoba. He was described as "Sober. Honest. Ready and willing in the discharge of his duty. Obedient & respectful of his superiors. . . . He has a tolerably good knowledge of the Indian language." In 1821, he was allowed to move south to a post in the Lower Red River Colony. Unhappy with slow advancement within the HBC, he left the employ of the company when he was permitted to retire in 1824.

== His store and relations with the HBC ==
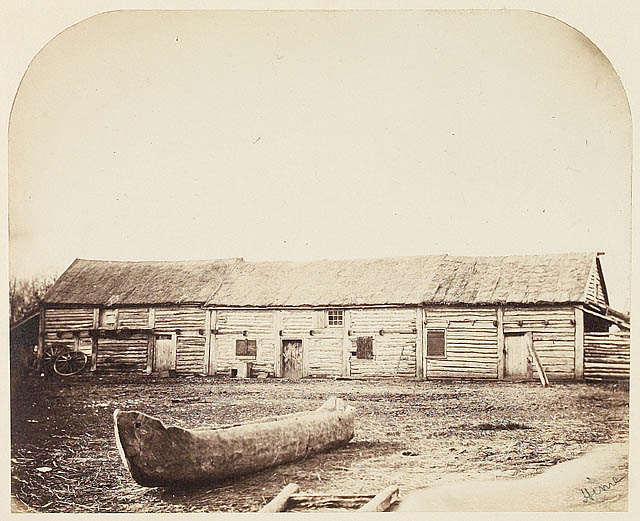
Andrew McDermot's store near Upper Fort Garry

After leaving the HBC, he started an independent store at Fort Garry, with the blessing of the HBC. The HBC were often unable to provide enough goods for the growing settlement and McDermot was able to import his goods on HBC ships through York Factory. McDermot's friendship with Governor George Simpson proved to be extremely profitable. He was allowed a special license to trade furs to prevent furs from being traded at the American fur trade post at Pembina, North Dakota, and was granted many contracts from the HBC. In 1839 he was made a member of the Council of Assiniboia. He was part of a committee on the council which was responsible for the construction of roads and bridges, surveying, the operation of ferries, and public improvements.

However, by the early 1840s, his relationship with the HBC began to weaken. The HBC, in order to curb the growing amount of free trade or illegal trade, denied McDermot a freighting contract with the HBC and by 1845, his goods from England were not being allowed passage on HBC ships. Furious with Governor Christie over these sanctions, he resigned from the Council of Assiniboia. He did rejoin the council after an agreement was reached and partial reimbursement for his losses was paid.

McDermot and his partner, James Sinclair were two of the main forces behind the Guillaume Sayer free trade trial of 1849. He also had close ties with American trader Norman Kittson and used Kittson to import goods from the United States to his store at Fort Garry.

== His legacy ==
By the 1850s, Andrew McDermot was known as the "Richest Man in the Red River Settlement". He had a successful store, several water and grist mills dotting the Red and Assiniboine Rivers throughout the Red River Settlement and owned a large tract of land in what is now the nucleus of Winnipeg. His land, a river lot, started at the edge of the Hudson's Bay Company land and stretched with ten chains frontage on the Red extending back two miles. McDermot Avenue in Winnipeg marks the north boundary of the property. His home, Emerald Lodge, was said to be the most beautiful and welcoming home at Fort Garry. He donated land for the first Post Office in Winnipeg and with his son in law, A.G.B. Bannatyne, donated land for the Winnipeg General Hospital.
