= Joseph Taillefer =

Canadian politician

Joseph Noel Taillefer (December 25, 1828 – June 1, 1897) was a farmer, lawyer and political figure in Manitoba. He represented Ste. Agathe in 1879 and Morris from 1879 to 1883 as a Conservative.

He was born in the village of Saint-Joseph, Lower Canada near Montreal. Taillefer served as a Papal Zouave, He was made a Chevalier de l'ordre Pie 1X (Montreal paper Tuesday, June 1897), travelling to Europe in 1868. He came to the Red River Colony with the Wolseley Expedition in 1870. Taillefer married Mary Jane McDermot, the daughter of a well-known Winnipeg merchant. Andrew McDermot, The family later moved to a homestead in Lebret, Saskatchewan. Taillefer died in hospital at St. Boniface.
