= Andrew Bannatyne =

Canadian politician (1829–1889)

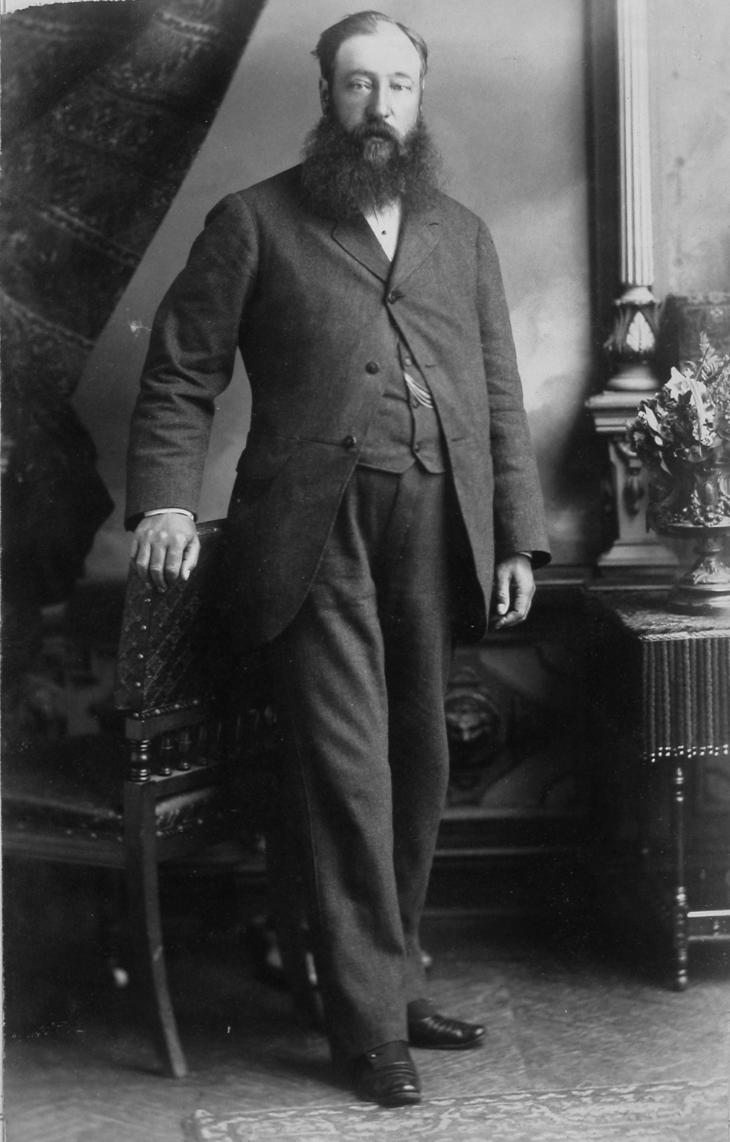

Member of Parliament for Provencher
- In office March 31, 1875 – September 16, 1878
- Monarch: Victoria
- Preceded by: Louis Riel
- Succeeded by: Joseph Dubuc

Personal details
- Born: Andrew Graham Ballenden Bannatyne; October 31, 1829 South Ronaldsay, Orkney, Scotland
- Died: May 18, 1889 (aged 59) Minnesota, United States
- Party: Liberal Party of Canada
- Spouse: Annie Bannatyne
- Occupation: Politician, Fur trader

Andrew Graham Ballenden Bannatyne (October 31, 1829 – May 18, 1889) was a Canadian politician, fur trader and leading citizen of Winnipeg, Manitoba.

== Biography ==
Bannatyne was born on the island of South Ronaldsay, Orkney, in Scotland and was three years old when his father, a British government fisheries official in Stromness, died. He joined the Hudson's Bay Company as a 14-year-old apprentice clerk and set sail for Canada. His family had had a long association with the company. Bannatyne's great-grandfather was governor of a Hudson's Bay Company district in Rupert's Land, his grandfather had been governor of York Factory, and his uncle was chief factor of the company. He was assigned to Sault Ste. Marie for two years, joining his uncle, and was then transferred to Fort Garry.

From 1846, Bannatyne was stationed at Norway House, Rupert's Land, in what is now Manitoba as a junior clerk at the trading post. He quit the company when his contract expired in 1851 in order to get married to Annie Bannatyne, daughter of Andrew McDermot, and go into business for himself in the Red River Colony, where he was arrested by the Hudson's Bay Company for illegal trading, which was a violation of the company's monopoly over the fur trade. He was released in a decision by the company's London office and established what became the largest merchant and outfitting company in the Red River Colony with Alexander Begg. Bannatyne became possibly the wealthiest and most influential citizen in Red River Colony.

He was appointed magistrate in 1861 and became a member of the Council of Assiniboia in 1868, which was the appointed administrative body of Rupert's Land.

During the Red River Rebellion Bannatyne agreed to serve as postmaster in Louis Riel's Provisional Government of Red River Settlement in 1869 on the condition that the rebel government seek terms with Canada.

After Manitoba was created as a province in 1870, the first session of the Manitoba legislature was held in four rooms of Bannatyne's Winnipeg house.

In 1871, he was appointed Winnipeg's first postmaster and also helped establish the freemasons in Manitoba.

He was appointed to the Temporary North-West Council in 1872. In the 1874 federal election, he was defeated in his bid for a federal parliamentary seat in Selkirk, being narrowly defeated by Hudson's Bay Company official Donald A. Smith, but was elected in 1875 to the House of Commons of Canada as the Liberal MP for Provencher, filling a vacancy caused by the expulsion of Riel from the House of Commons and his banishment from Canada. He retired from politics in 1878.

Bannatyne helped organize the Winnipeg General Hospital and was involved in other business and philanthropic ventures in Winnipeg. He was the first president of Winnipeg's Board of Trade and first president of the Manitoba Club.

After becoming a very rich man, Bannatyne was virtually wiped out when the land boom crashed in 1882. His heavy indebtedness worsened his already poor health, and he began to winter in the southern United States in order to ease his constitution.

He died in Minnesota in 1889 while returning from Texas.

== Legacy ==
Bannatyne Avenue and École Bannatyne in Winnipeg are named after him.

He was the great-great-grandfather of singer-songwriter Amanda Rheaume.
