= Canadian Association of Former Parliamentarians =

Canadian non-profit organization

The Canadian Association of Former Parliamentarians (CAFP) is a non-profit organization, established by an Act of the Parliament of Canada, the membership of which is composed of former members of the Senate and House of Commons of Canada.

== History ==
On May 29, 1996, legislation establishing the Canadian Association of Former Parliamentarians was adopted. Concurrently, thirty-four bronze plaques, representing the thirty-four parliaments to that time, and containing the names of all persons who had served in the Senate and House of Commons to that time, were unveiled in the Visitors Centre of the House of Commons.

The association was created in response to a 1985 recommendation of a Special Committee on Reform of the House of Commons, chaired by James McGrath. It is modelled after the United States Association of Former Members of Congress, founded in 1970.

Among its other activities, the association has established an Educational Foundation with, among other objectives, to "generally support the strengthening of democracy and good governance in Canada and abroad." The association is also a participant in the International Election Monitors Institute, providing "former legislators as election observers to operate worldwide in collaboration with other democracy-building organizations."

== Awards ==
=== Distinguished Service Award ===
The association sponsors an annual Distinguished Service Award, "presented annually to a former parliamentarian who has made an outstanding contribution to the country and its democratic institutions" but might go otherwise unnoticed or forgotten despite their contributions. The criteria for this award were established by John Fraser, Bob Rae, and Mitchell Sharp.

Past recipients:

- John Matheson (1999)
- Stan Darling (2000)
- Douglas Fisher (2001)
- John M. Reid (2002)
- Aideen Nicholson (2003)
- Bruce Halliday (2004)
- Joseph-Roland Comtois (2005)
- Wilton Littlechild (2006)
- Jacques Hébert (2007)
- Sheila Finestone (2008)
- Douglas Roche (2009)
- Keith Penner (2010)
- Jim Hawkes (2011)
- Walter McLean (2012)
- Bill Blaikie (2013)
- Michael Kirby (2014)
- David MacDonald (2015)
- Jack Murta (2016)
- Bryon Wilfert (2017)
- Don Boudria (2018)
- Marlene Catterall (2019)

=== Lifetime Achievement Award ===
The association periodically gives out a Lifetime Achievement Award to honour former parliamentarians for exceptional public service.

Past recipients:

- Don Mazankowski (2010)
- Ed Lumley (2011)
- Alexa McDonough (2012)
- Michael Wilson (2014)
- Bob Rae (2018)
- Jean Charest (2019)
