= Alexander Begg (1825–1905) =

Alexander Begg (May 7, 1825 – March 19, 1905) was a Scottish-Canadian teacher, civil servant and journalist.

He came to Belleville, Upper Canada in 1846 and taught in public schools in neighbouring towns until 1850, when he helped found the Bowmanville Messenger, Oshawa's first newspaper. He later founded papers including the Brighton Sentinel and the Trenton Advocate and would go on to write for the Toronto Daily Mail as a correspondent in the West.

After starting a ranch in Alberta with one of his sons in 1882, Begg joined his other son as a reporter for the Daily British Colonist in Victoria.

In 1872 he had been Ontario's emigration commissioner in Glasgow. In BC he continued to work to encourage emigration from Scotland and the provincial government made him commissioner in charge of settling a community of crofter-fishermen on the West Coast. He styled himself C.C. (for "Crofter Commissioner") to distinguish himself from another Alexander Begg also working as a journalist in Victoria at the time.

== Publications ==
- Letters on the situation in the north west, by Julius, as they appeared in the Montreal "Gazette" ([Montreal], 1881);
- History of British Columbia from its earliest discovery to the present time (Toronto, 1894; repr. 1972);
- Report relative to the Alaskan boundary question (Victoria, 1900)
- A sketch of the successful missionary work of William Duncan amongst the Indian tribes in northern British Columbia, from 1858 to 1901 (Victoria, 1901)
- Statement of facts regarding the Alaska boundary question, compiled for the government of British Columbia (R. Wolfenden, Victoria, 1902).
