= Stewart Mulvey =

Canadian politician

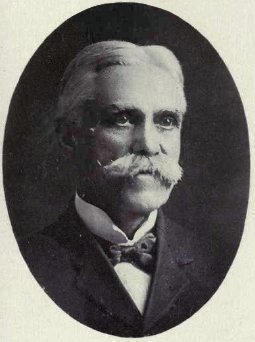

Member of the Legislative Assembly of Manitoba
- In office 1896–1899

Personal details
- Born: May 1834 Sligo, Ireland, United Kingdom
- Died: 26 May 1908 (aged 73–74) Vancouver, British Columbia, Canada

Stewart Mulvey (May 1834 – 26 May 1908) was a Canadian teacher, newspaper editor, militia officer, office holder and politician.

Born in Sligo, Ireland, the son of Henry Mulvey and Barbara McGee, Mulvey was a teacher starting at the age of 16 in Irish National School system and the schools of the Church Educational Society. In 1856, he emigrated to Canada East at the invitation of Egerton Ryerson, the superintendent of education for Canada East, settling in Haldimand County where he was a teacher and editor of the local newspaper. He also served as a lieutenant in the 37th (Haldimand) Battalion of Rifles.

In 1870, he joined the Red River expeditionary force and left for Winnipeg. From 1871 to 1873, Mulvey was editor of the Winnipeg newspaper, the Manitoba Liberal. From 1873 to 1882, he was a collector with the Department of Inland Revenue. During the North-West Rebellion, he served as a major in the 95th Battalion (Manitoba Grenadiers). A Protestant, he was active in the Orange Lodge in Winnipeg.

From 1883 to 1888, he was an alderman on the Winnipeg City Council. In the 1882 election, he ran unsuccessfully for the House of Commons of Canada for the electoral district of Selkirk. In 1896, he was elected to the Legislative Assembly of Manitoba for the electoral district of Morris. An independent, he was defeated in 1899.
