= Morris (electoral district) =

Defunct provincial electoral district in Manitoba, Canada

Coordinates: 49.699°N 97.448°W

Manitoba electoral district
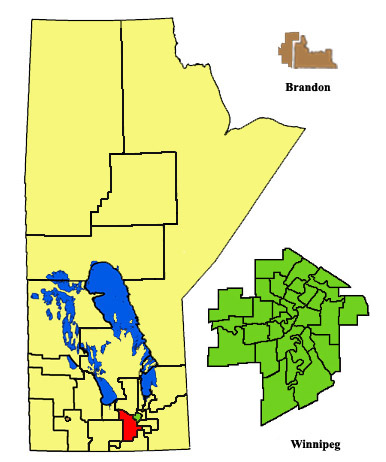
- The 2011 boundaries of Morris highlighted in red

Defunct provincial electoral district
- Legislature: Legislative Assembly of Manitoba
- District created: 1879
- First contested: 1879
- Last contested: 2016

Demographics
- Population (2011): 22,664
- Electors (2014): 13,782
- Census division(s): Division No. 2, Division No. 3, Division No. 10, Division No. 11,
- Census subdivision(s): Cartier, Hanover, Headingley, Macdonald, Morris (RM), Morris (Town), Niverville, Ritchot, St. François Xavier

Morris is a former provincial electoral district of Manitoba, Canada. It was created by redistribution in 1879 and named after the town and municipality of Morris, which in turn are named after Alexander Morris, who served as Lieutenant Governor of Manitoba from 1872 to 1877.

Following the redistribution of Manitoba electoral districts in 2011, the riding was bordered to the south by Emerson, to the north by Lakeside, to the west by Midland and Portage la Prairie, and to the east by Steinbach, Dawson Trail, Assiniboia, Kirkfield Park, and Charleswood.

The largest communities in the riding were Morris, Niverville, and La Salle. Other communities included Elie, Oak Bluff, Sanford, Starbuck, Ste. Agathe, St. Eustache, and St. Francois Xavier.

In 1999, the average family income was $53,719, and the unemployment rate was 3.90%. Agriculture accounted for 23% of the riding's industry, followed by the retail trade at 10%. Eighteen per cent of Morris's residents were of German background, and a further 17% were French. The riding had the third-highest percentage of Francophones in Manitoba.

The Progressive Conservative Party of Manitoba represented Morris from 1954 to 2019, and the riding was generally regarded as safe for the party.

The Morris riding was eliminated ahead of the 2019 Manitoba general election and its territory was redistributed to the Midland, La Verendrye, and newly-formed Springfield-Ritchot ridings.

== Members of the Legislative Assembly ==
Name	Party	Took office	Left office
Joseph Taillefer	Independent, probably pro-Government	1879	1883
Henry Tennant	Cons	1883	1886
Alphonse Martin	Lib	1886	1891
Alphonse Martin	Independent/Opposition	1891	1896
Stewart Mulvey	Lib	1896	1899
Colin Campbell	Cons	1899	1913
Jacques Parent	Cons	1914	1918
William Clubb	Farmer	1920	1922
William Clubb	UFM	1922	1932
William Clubb	Lib-Prog	1932	1941
John Dryden	Independent, pro-coalition	1941	1945
John Dryden	Lib-Prog	1945	1949
Harry Shewman	Independent, pro-coalition	1949	1950
Harry Shewman	Independent	1950	1954(?)
Harry Shewman	PC	1954(?)	1968
Warner Jorgenson	PC	1969	1981
Clayton Manness	PC	1981	1995
Frank Pitura	PC	1995	2003
Mavis Taillieu	PC	2003	2013
Shannon Martin	PC	2014	2019

== Election results ==
=== 1879 ===
1879 Manitoba general election
Party	Candidate	Votes	%
Undeclared	Joseph Taillefer	153	49.84
Undeclared	Stewart Mulvey	118	38.44
Undeclared	Alphonse-Fortunat Martin	36	11.73
Total valid votes		307	–
Rejected		N/A	–
Eligible voters / Turnout		N/A	–
Source(s) Source: Manitoba. Chief Electoral Officer (1999). Statement of Votes for the 37th Provincial General Election, September 21, 1999 (PDF) (Report). Winnipeg: Elections Manitoba.

=== 1883 ===
1883 Manitoba general election
Party	Candidate	Votes	%	±%
Conservative	Henry Tennant	204	42.86	–
Liberal	Alphonse-Fortunat Martin	138	28.99	–
Conservative	G. C. Wilde	134	28.15	–
Total valid votes		476	–	–
Rejected		N/A	–	
Eligible voters / Turnout		N/A	–	–
Source(s) Source: Manitoba. Chief Electoral Officer (1999). Statement of Votes for the 37th Provincial General Election, September 21, 1999 (PDF) (Report). Winnipeg: Elections Manitoba.

=== 1886 ===
1886 Manitoba general election
Party	Candidate	Votes	%	±%
Liberal	Alphonse-Fortunat Martin	249	44.23	15.24
Conservative	Henry Tennant	170	30.20	-40.81
Independent	William Osborne Smith	144	25.58	–
Total valid votes		563	–	–
Rejected		N/A	–	
Eligible voters / Turnout		1,962	28.70	–
Source(s) Source: Manitoba. Chief Electoral Officer (1999). Statement of Votes for the 37th Provincial General Election, September 21, 1999 (PDF) (Report). Winnipeg: Elections Manitoba.

=== 1888 ===
1888 Manitoba general election
Party	Candidate	Votes	%	±%
Liberal	Alphonse-Fortunat Martin		0.00	-44.23
Total valid votes			–	–
Rejected		N/A	–	
Eligible voters / Turnout		N/A	–	–
Source(s) Source: Manitoba. Chief Electoral Officer (1999). Statement of Votes for the 37th Provincial General Election, September 21, 1999 (PDF) (Report). Winnipeg: Elections Manitoba.

=== 1892 ===
1892 Manitoba general election
Party	Candidate	Votes	%	±%
Independent	Alphonse-Fortunat Martin	465	51.38	–
Independent	Stewart Mulvey	440	48.62	–
Total valid votes		905	–	–
Rejected		N/A	–	
Eligible voters / Turnout		1,055	85.78	–
Source(s) Source: Manitoba. Chief Electoral Officer (1999). Statement of Votes for the 37th Provincial General Election, September 21, 1999 (PDF) (Report). Winnipeg: Elections Manitoba.

=== 1896 ===
1896 Manitoba general election
Party	Candidate	Votes	%	±%
Liberal	Stewart Mulvey	555	56.29	–
Conservative	Alphonse-Fortunat Martin	431	43.71	–
Total valid votes		986	–	–
Rejected		N/A	–	
Eligible voters / Turnout		1,339	73.64	-12.14
Source(s) Source: Manitoba. Chief Electoral Officer (1999). Statement of Votes for the 37th Provincial General Election, September 21, 1999 (PDF) (Report). Winnipeg: Elections Manitoba.

=== 1899 ===
1899 Manitoba general election
Party	Candidate	Votes	%	±%
Conservative	Colin H. Campbell	828	56.40	12.69
Liberal	Stewart Mulvey	640	43.60	-12.69
Total valid votes		1,468	–	–
Rejected		N/A	–	
Eligible voters / Turnout		2,031	72.28	-1.36
Source(s) Source: Manitoba. Chief Electoral Officer (1999). Statement of Votes for the 37th Provincial General Election, September 21, 1999 (PDF) (Report). Winnipeg: Elections Manitoba.

=== 1900 by-election ===
Manitoba provincial by-election, 1900
Party	Candidate	Votes	%	±%
Government	Colin H. Campbell	809	60.15	–
Opposition	M. Lawrie	536	39.85	–
Total valid votes		1,345	–	–
Rejected		N/A	–	
Eligible voters / Turnout		N/A	–	–
Source(s) Source: Manitoba. Chief Electoral Officer (1999). Statement of Votes for the 37th Provincial General Election, September 21, 1999 (PDF) (Report). Winnipeg: Elections Manitoba.

=== 1903 ===
1903 Manitoba general election
Party	Candidate	Votes	%	±%
Conservative	Colin H. Campbell	620	55.36	–
Liberal	Napoleon Comeault	500	44.64	–
Total valid votes		1,120	–	–
Rejected		N/A	–	
Eligible voters / Turnout		1,249	89.67	–
Source(s) Source: Manitoba. Chief Electoral Officer (1999). Statement of Votes for the 37th Provincial General Election, September 21, 1999 (PDF) (Report). Winnipeg: Elections Manitoba.

=== 1907 ===
1907 Manitoba general election
Party	Candidate	Votes	%	±%
Conservative	Colin H. Campbell	526	50.10	-5.26
Liberal	John Patrick Molloy	524	49.90	5.26
Total valid votes		1,050	–	–
Rejected		N/A	–	
Eligible voters / Turnout		1,253	83.80	-5.87
Source(s) Source: Manitoba. Chief Electoral Officer (1999). Statement of Votes for the 37th Provincial General Election, September 21, 1999 (PDF) (Report). Winnipeg: Elections Manitoba.

=== 1910 ===
1910 Manitoba general election
Party	Candidate	Votes	%	±%
Conservative	Colin H. Campbell	746	56.56	6.46
Liberal	Robert Lachlan Ross	573	43.44	-6.46
Total valid votes		1,319	–	–
Rejected		N/A	–	
Eligible voters / Turnout		1,493	88.35	4.55
Source(s) Source: Manitoba. Chief Electoral Officer (1999). Statement of Votes for the 37th Provincial General Election, September 21, 1999 (PDF) (Report). Winnipeg: Elections Manitoba.

=== 1914 ===
1914 Manitoba general election
Party	Candidate	Votes	%	±%
Conservative	Jacques Parent	920	58.30	1.74
Liberal	William Molloy	658	41.70	-1.74
Total valid votes		1,578	–	–
Rejected		N/A	–	
Eligible voters / Turnout		1,773	89.00	0.66
Source(s) Source: Manitoba. Chief Electoral Officer (1999). Statement of Votes for the 37th Provincial General Election, September 21, 1999 (PDF) (Report). Winnipeg: Elections Manitoba.

=== 1915 ===
1915 Manitoba general election
Party	Candidate	Votes	%	±%
Conservative	Jacques Parent	740	52.00	-6.30
Liberal	William Molloy	683	48.00	6.30
Total valid votes		1,423	–	–
Rejected		N/A	–	
Eligible voters / Turnout		1,736	81.97	-7.03
Source(s) Source: Manitoba. Chief Electoral Officer (1999). Statement of Votes for the 37th Provincial General Election, September 21, 1999 (PDF) (Report). Winnipeg: Elections Manitoba.

=== 1920 ===
1920 Manitoba general election
Party	Candidate	Votes	%	±%
Farmer	William Clubb	930	47.79	–
Farmer	Alexandre "Buffalo" Ayotte	765	39.31	–
Independent	Fred J. Last	251	12.90	–
Total valid votes		1,946	–	–
Rejected		N/A	–	
Eligible voters / Turnout		2,624	74.16	-7.81
Source(s) Source: Manitoba. Chief Electoral Officer (1999). Statement of Votes for the 37th Provincial General Election, September 21, 1999 (PDF) (Report). Winnipeg: Elections Manitoba.

=== 1922 ===
1922 Manitoba general election
Party	Candidate	Votes	%	±%
United Farmers	William Clubb	1,222	61.94	–
Liberal	Alexandre "Buffalo" Ayotte	751	38.06	–
Total valid votes		1,973	–	–
Rejected		N/A	–	
Eligible voters / Turnout		2,840	69.47	-4.69
Source(s) Source: Manitoba. Chief Electoral Officer (1999). Statement of Votes for the 37th Provincial General Election, September 21, 1999 (PDF) (Report). Winnipeg: Elections Manitoba.

=== 1927 ===
1927 Manitoba general election
Party	Candidate	Votes	%	±%
Progressive	William Clubb	1,663	85.37	–
Liberal	Walter J. Fulton	285	14.63	-23.43
Total valid votes		1,948	–	–
Rejected		N/A	–	
Eligible voters / Turnout		3,091	63.02	-6.45
Source(s) Source: Manitoba. Chief Electoral Officer (1999). Statement of Votes for the 37th Provincial General Election, September 21, 1999 (PDF) (Report). Winnipeg: Elections Manitoba.

=== 1929 by-election ===
Manitoba provincial by-election, 1929
Party	Candidate	Votes	%	±%
Progressive	William Clubb		0.00	-85.37
Total valid votes			–	–
Rejected		N/A	–	
Eligible voters / Turnout		N/A	–	–
Source(s) Source: Manitoba. Chief Electoral Officer (1999). Statement of Votes for the 37th Provincial General Election, September 21, 1999 (PDF) (Report). Winnipeg: Elections Manitoba.

=== 1932 ===
1932 Manitoba general election
Party	Candidate	Votes	%	±%
Liberal–Progressive	William Clubb	2,526	70.11	–
Conservative	C. B. McNulty	1,077	29.89	–
Total valid votes		3,603	–	–
Rejected		N/A	–	
Eligible voters / Turnout		4,514	79.82	–
Source(s) Source: Manitoba. Chief Electoral Officer (1999). Statement of Votes for the 37th Provincial General Election, September 21, 1999 (PDF) (Report). Winnipeg: Elections Manitoba.

=== 1936 ===
1936 Manitoba general election
Party	Candidate	Votes	%	±%
Liberal–Progressive	William Clubb	2,030	52.28	-17.83
Conservative	P. Bourgeois	1,853	47.72	17.83
Total valid votes		3,883	–	–
Rejected		49	–	
Eligible voters / Turnout		5,394	72.90	-6.92
Source(s) Source: Manitoba. Chief Electoral Officer (1999). Statement of Votes for the 37th Provincial General Election, September 21, 1999 (PDF) (Report). Winnipeg: Elections Manitoba.

=== 1941 ===
1941 Manitoba general election
Party	Candidate	Votes	%	±%
Independent	John C. Dryden	1,708	59.37	–
Liberal–Progressive	Leo Arthur Slater	1,169	40.63	-11.65
Total valid votes		2,877	–	–
Rejected		32	–	
Eligible voters / Turnout		5,574	52.19	-20.71
Source(s) Source: Manitoba. Chief Electoral Officer (1999). Statement of Votes for the 37th Provincial General Election, September 21, 1999 (PDF) (Report). Winnipeg: Elections Manitoba.

=== 1945 ===
1945 Manitoba general election
Party	Candidate	Votes	%	±%
Liberal–Progressive	John C. Dryden	1,676	70.13	29.49
Co-operative Commonwealth	Ivan Langtry	714	29.87	–
Total valid votes		2,390	–	–
Rejected		62	–	
Eligible voters / Turnout		5,697	43.04	-9.15
Source(s) Source: Manitoba. Chief Electoral Officer (1999). Statement of Votes for the 37th Provincial General Election, September 21, 1999 (PDF) (Report). Winnipeg: Elections Manitoba.

=== 1949 ===
1949 Manitoba general election
Party	Candidate	Votes	%	±%
Independent	Harry Shewman	1,452	47.76	–
Liberal–Progressive	John C. Dryden	1,253	41.22	-28.91
Co-operative Commonwealth	Thomas Wishart	335	11.02	-18.85
Total valid votes		3,040	–	–
Rejected		99	–	
Eligible voters / Turnout		5,953	52.73	9.69
Source(s) Source: Manitoba. Chief Electoral Officer (1999). Statement of Votes for the 37th Provincial General Election, September 21, 1999 (PDF) (Report). Winnipeg: Elections Manitoba.

=== 1953 ===
1953 Manitoba general election
Party	Candidate	Votes	%	±%
Independent	Harry Shewman	1,960	48.36	0.60
Liberal–Progressive	Arthur S. Beaubien	1,249	30.82	-10.40
Social Credit	Wilbert J. Tinkler	844	20.82	–
Total valid votes		4,053	–	–
Rejected		117	–	
Eligible voters / Turnout		5,638	73.96	21.23
Source(s) Source: Manitoba. Chief Electoral Officer (1999). Statement of Votes for the 37th Provincial General Election, September 21, 1999 (PDF) (Report). Winnipeg: Elections Manitoba.

=== 1958 ===
1958 Manitoba general election
Party	Candidate	Votes	%	±%
Progressive Conservative	Harry Shewman	1,762	56.01	–
Liberal–Progressive	Bruce MacKenzie	1,014	32.23	1.41
Social Credit	August Recksiedler	370	11.76	-9.06
Total valid votes		3,146	–	–
Rejected		23	–	
Eligible voters / Turnout		5,264	60.20	-13.76
Source(s) Source: Manitoba. Chief Electoral Officer (1999). Statement of Votes for the 37th Provincial General Election, September 21, 1999 (PDF) (Report). Winnipeg: Elections Manitoba.

=== 1959 ===
1959 Manitoba general election
Party	Candidate	Votes	%	±%
Progressive Conservative	Harry Shewman	1,905	59.48	3.47
Liberal–Progressive	Bruce Mackenzie	1,298	40.52	8.29
Total valid votes		3,203	–	–
Rejected		30	–	
Eligible voters / Turnout		5,266	61.39	1.19
Source(s) Source: Manitoba. Chief Electoral Officer (1999). Statement of Votes for the 37th Provincial General Election, September 21, 1999 (PDF) (Report). Winnipeg: Elections Manitoba.

=== 1962 ===
1962 Manitoba general election
Party	Candidate	Votes	%	±%
Progressive Conservative	Harry Shewman	1,648	48.71	-10.76
Liberal	Phillippe A. Perron	1,126	33.28	–
Social Credit	Wilbert J. Tinkler	609	18.00	–
Total valid votes		3,383	–	–
Rejected		14	–	
Eligible voters / Turnout		5,262	64.56	3.16
Source(s) Source: Manitoba. Chief Electoral Officer (1999). Statement of Votes for the 37th Provincial General Election, September 21, 1999 (PDF) (Report). Winnipeg: Elections Manitoba.

=== 1966 ===
1966 Manitoba general election
Party	Candidate	Votes	%	±%
Progressive Conservative	Harry Shewman	1,518	47.80	-0.92
Liberal	Bruce MacKenzie	1,288	40.55	7.27
New Democratic	William T. Loftus	370	11.65	–
Total valid votes		3,176	–	–
Rejected		33	–	
Eligible voters / Turnout		5,275	60.83	-3.72
Source(s) Source: Manitoba. Chief Electoral Officer (1999). Statement of Votes for the 37th Provincial General Election, September 21, 1999 (PDF) (Report). Winnipeg: Elections Manitoba.

=== 1969 by-election ===
Manitoba provincial by-election, February 20, 1969: Morris (electoral district) Death of Harry Shewman
Party	Candidate	Votes	%	±%	Expenditures
Progressive Conservative	Warner Jorgenson	2,146	65.77	17.97	$966.85
Liberal	Ralph Rasmussen	841	25.77	-14.78	$526.56
New Democratic	William T. Loftus	276	8.46	-3.19	$770.61
Total valid votes		3,263	–	–	
Rejected		15	–		
Eligible voters / turnout		5,284	62.07	–	
Source(s) Source: Manitoba. Chief Electoral Officer (1999). Statement of Votes for the 37th Provincial General Election, September 21, 1999 (PDF) (Report). Winnipeg: Elections Manitoba.

=== 1969 ===
1969 Manitoba general election
Party	Candidate	Votes	%	±%
Progressive Conservative	Warner Jorgenson	2,472	53.76	-12.01
Liberal	Joseph Legault	1,183	25.73	-0.05
New Democratic	William T. Loftus	712	15.48	7.03
Social Credit	Henry Funk	231	5.02	–
Total valid votes		4,598	–	–
Rejected		15	–	
Eligible voters / Turnout		7,537	61.20	–
Source(s) Source: Manitoba. Chief Electoral Officer (1999). Statement of Votes for the 37th Provincial General Election, September 21, 1999 (PDF) (Report). Winnipeg: Elections Manitoba.

=== 1973 ===
1973 Manitoba general election
Party	Candidate	Votes	%	±%
Progressive Conservative	Warner Jorgenson	3,650	60.06	6.30
New Democratic	Lawrence Lewco	1,602	26.36	10.88
Liberal	Norm Dashevsky	825	13.58	-12.15
Total valid votes		6,077	–	–
Rejected		25	–	
Eligible voters / Turnout		8,186	74.54	13.34
Source(s) Source: Manitoba. Chief Electoral Officer (1999). Statement of Votes for the 37th Provincial General Election, September 21, 1999 (PDF) (Report). Winnipeg: Elections Manitoba.

=== 1977 ===
1977 Manitoba general election
Party	Candidate	Votes	%	±%
Progressive Conservative	Warner Jorgenson	4,484	72.89	12.82
New Democratic	Al Lenz	1,152	18.73	-7.64
Liberal	Donald "Don" MacGillivray	516	8.39	-5.19
Total valid votes		6,152	–	–
Rejected		10	–	
Eligible voters / Turnout		8,951	68.84	-5.70
Source(s) Source: Manitoba. Chief Electoral Officer (1999). Statement of Votes for the 37th Provincial General Election, September 21, 1999 (PDF) (Report). Winnipeg: Elections Manitoba.

=== 1981 ===
1981 Manitoba general election
Party	Candidate	Votes	%	±%
Progressive Conservative	Clayton Manness	4,579	71.55	-1.34
New Democratic	Peter Francis	1,821	28.45	9.73
Total valid votes		6,400	–	–
Rejected		35	–	
Eligible voters / Turnout		9,927	64.82	-4.02
Source(s) Source: Manitoba. Chief Electoral Officer (1999). Statement of Votes for the 37th Provincial General Election, September 21, 1999 (PDF) (Report). Winnipeg: Elections Manitoba.

=== 1986 ===
1986 Manitoba general election
Party	Candidate	Votes	%	±%
Progressive Conservative	Clayton Manness	4,378	68.78	-2.77
New Democratic	Audreen House	1,140	17.91	-10.54
Liberal	Calvin Knaggs	847	13.31	n/a
Turnout		6,382	59.73	-5.09
Progressive Conservative hold		Swing		+3.89
Source: Elections Manitoba

=== 1988 ===
1988 Manitoba general election
Party	Candidate	Votes	%	±%
Progressive Conservative	Clayton Manness	4,578	60.93	-7.85
Liberal	Barbara Plas	1,832	24.38	11.08
Confederation of Regions	Raymond Switzer	597	7.95	–
New Democratic	Cliff Hodgins	449	5.98	-11.93
Independent	Jeffrey Plas	57	0.76	–
Total valid votes		7,513	–	–
Rejected		11	–	
Eligible voters / Turnout		10,867	69.24	9.51
Source(s) Source: Manitoba. Chief Electoral Officer (1999). Statement of Votes for the 37th Provincial General Election, September 21, 1999 (PDF) (Report). Winnipeg: Elections Manitoba.

=== 1990 ===
1990 Manitoba general election
Party	Candidate	Votes	%	±%
Progressive Conservative	Clayton Manness	5,353	63.64	2.70
Liberal	Bill Roth	2,036	24.20	-0.18
New Democratic	Gary Nelson	721	8.57	2.59
Confederation of Regions	Mark Edmondson	302	3.59	-4.36
Total valid votes		8,412	–	–
Rejected		15	–	
Eligible voters / Turnout		12,812	65.77	-3.46
Source(s) Source: Manitoba. Chief Electoral Officer (1999). Statement of Votes for the 37th Provincial General Election, September 21, 1999 (PDF) (Report). Winnipeg: Elections Manitoba.

=== 1995 ===
1995 Manitoba general election
Party	Candidate	Votes	%	±%
Progressive Conservative	Frank Pitura	5,662	60.99	-2.65
Liberal	Bill Roth	2,329	25.09	0.88
New Democratic	Glen Hallick	1,158	12.47	3.90
Libertarian	Dennis Rice	135	1.45	–
Total valid votes		9,284	–	–
Rejected		26	–	
Eligible voters / Turnout		13,104	71.05	5.27
Source(s) Source: Manitoba. Chief Electoral Officer (1999). Statement of Votes for the 37th Provincial General Election, September 21, 1999 (PDF) (Report). Winnipeg: Elections Manitoba.

=== 1999 ===
1999 Manitoba general election
Party	Candidate	Votes	%	±%	Expenditures
Progressive Conservative	Frank Pitura	4,673	53.38	-7.61	$20,807.00
Liberal	Herm Martens	2,179	24.89	-0.20	$9,869.40
New Democratic	Paul Hagen	1,796	20.51	8.04	$2,805.00
Libertarian	Dennis Rice	107	1.22	-0.23	$341.37
Total valid votes		8,755	–	–	
Rejected		45	–		
Eligible voters / turnout		13,111	67.12	-3.93	
Source(s) Source: Manitoba. Chief Electoral Officer (1999). Statement of Votes for the 37th Provincial General Election, September 21, 1999 (PDF) (Report). Winnipeg: Elections Manitoba.

=== 2003 ===
2003 Manitoba general election
Party	Candidate	Votes	%	±%	Expenditures
Progressive Conservative	Mavis Taillieu	3,996	57.16	3.78	$30,319.43
New Democratic	John Auger	1,588	22.71	2.20	$859.97
Liberal	Michael Van Walleghem	1,407	20.13	-4.76	$9,781.96
Total valid votes		6,991	–	–	
Rejected		28	–		
Eligible voters / Turnout		13,355	52.56	-14.56	
Source(s) Source: Manitoba. Chief Electoral Officer (2003). Statement of Votes for the 38th Provincial General Election, June 3, 2003 (PDF) (Report). Winnipeg: Elections Manitoba.

=== 2007 ===
2007 Manitoba general election
Party	Candidate	Votes	%	±%	Expenditures
Progressive Conservative	Mavis Taillieu	4,404	56.98	-0.18	$20,183.91
New Democratic	Kevin Stevenson	2,517	32.57	9.85	$3,146.85
Liberal	Michael Sherby	808	10.45	-9.67	$340.30
Total valid votes		7,729	–	–	
Rejected		61	–		
Eligible voters / turnout		14,392	54.13	1.57	
Source(s) Source: Manitoba. Chief Electoral Officer (2007). Statement of Votes for the 39th Provincial General Election, May 22, 2007 (PDF) (Report). Winnipeg: Elections Manitoba.

=== 2011 ===
2011 Manitoba general election
Party	Candidate	Votes	%	±%	Expenditures
Progressive Conservative	Mavis Taillieu	5,681	74.00	17.02	$23,120.64
New Democratic	Mohammed Alli	1,487	19.37	-13.20	$0.00
Liberal	Janelle Mailhot	509	6.63	-3.82	$0.00
Total valid votes		7,677	–	–	
Rejected		42	–		
Eligible voters / turnout		15,228	50.69	-3.44	
Progressive Conservative hold		Swing		+15.11	
Source(s) Source: Manitoba. Chief Electoral Officer (2011). Statement of Votes for the 40th Provincial General Election, October 4, 2011 (PDF) (Report). Winnipeg: Elections Manitoba. "Election Returns: 40th General Election". Elections Manitoba. 2011.

=== 2014 by-election ===
Manitoba provincial by-election, January 28, 2014
Party	Candidate	Votes	%	±%	Expenditures
Progressive Conservative	Shannon Martin	2,642	69.99	-4.01	$14,889.99
New Democratic	Dean Harder	488	12.93	-6.44	$5,522.35
Liberal	Jeremy Barber	422	11.18	4.55	$4,504.42
Independent	Ray Shaw	138	3.66	–	$143.45
Green	Alain Landry	85	2.25	–	
Total valid votes		3,775	–	–	
Rejected		17	–		
Eligible voters / Turnout		13,782	–	–	
Progressive Conservative hold		Swing		+1.21	
Source(s) Source:

=== 2016 ===
2016 Manitoba general election
Party	Candidate	Votes	%	±%	Expenditures
Progressive Conservative	Shannon Martin	6,980	75.46	5.47	$26,181.17
Liberal	John Falk	1,430	15.46	4.28	$9,800.85
New Democratic	Mohamed Alli	840	9.08	-3.85	$5,417.92
Total valid votes		9,250	–	–	
Rejected		159	–		
Eligible voters / turnout		16,523	56.94	–	
Source(s) Source: Manitoba. Chief Electoral Officer (2016). Statement of Votes for the 41st Provincial General Election, April 19, 2016 (PDF) (Report). Winnipeg: Elections Manitoba. "Election Returns: 41st General Election". Elections Manitoba. 2016.

== Previous boundaries ==
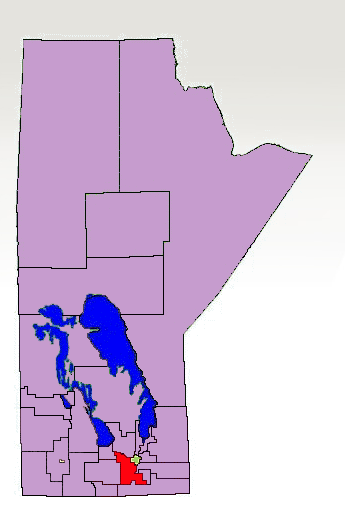
The 1998–2011 boundaries of the Morris electoral district highlighted in red.

== See also ==
- List of Manitoba provincial electoral districts
- Canadian provincial electoral districts
