= Alexander Begg (1839–1897) =

Canadian journalist and businessman

- Born: 19 July 1839
- Died: 6 September 1897 (aged 58)
- Occupations: Canadian Journalist and Businessman

Alexander Begg (19 July 1839 – 6 September 1897) was a Canadian journalist and businessman. His books covered historical events in Canada.

He was born in Quebec City and ended up heading west because of business he was conducting for an import-export firm's Hamilton, Ontario office. He arrived at the Red River Colony (Manitoba) in 1867 as an agent for various firms. The following year he formed a successful partnership as general merchants and outfitters with Andrew Bannatyne. This partnership lasted until late in 1871.

During this period and beyond, Begg was prominent in the community fighting for a representative government in Manitoba. At first, he was supportive of both the Métis and Hudson's Bay Company and criticized the expansionist ideas of many of his fellow Canadians. In the summer of 1874 he became editor of the Daily Nor’Wester. As the Red River Rebellion wore on, however, he began to advocate a negotiated annexation of the region by Canada, provided local rights were preserved. He was in business in Winnipeg until 1877 and published and edited a variety of materials. In 1877, he became Queen's Printer of Manitoba. He also was Sergeant-at-Arms to the Legislature and then Deputy Treasurer and Auditor at different times.

In his book about the Red River Troubles in 1869 he laid out the almost state-free social-political system before the rebellion started:

"The Courts of Justice savored more of arbitration than of a mere attention to the technicalities of law; and it generally happened that there were more cases decided outside the court-room than inside it. People at that period had learned to live on terms of friendship and kindliness towards each other; and, consequently, it was not a difficult matter to heal a breach between any two individuals. The Government at that time depended greatly on the quiet, peaceful, and contented character of the people for a strict observance of law and order, and did not deem it necessary to enforce severe measures."

Begg left Winnipeg in 1884 for London, England and in 1888 moved to Seattle to re-enter journalism. In 1892 he moved to Victoria, British Columbia as editor of the Victoria Daily News. He worked at his journalism in B.C. until his death. Begg should not be confused with another journalist of the same name active in Victoria at the time.

His written legacy includes much material from Manitoba and the North-West covering the period he had lived in Winnipeg and later years. In 1956, the Champlain Society reprinted Begg's journal, as well as several other documents relating to the Red River Rebellion, edited by Canadian historian W. L. Morton.

== Publications ==
- The creation of Manitoba; or, a history of the Red River troubles (Toronto, 1871) Internet Archive
- Dot it down; a story of life in the north-west (Toronto, 1871)
- Practical hand-book and guide to Manitoba and the northwest (Toronto, 1877)
- The great Canadian north west: its past history, present condition, and glorious prospects (Montreal, 1881)
- Seventeen years in the Canadian northwest (London, 1884)
- Wrecks in the sea of life, a novel (New York, [1884])
- Canada and its national highway (London, 1886)
- Emigration (London, 1886)
- The great north-west of Canada (London, [1886])
- History of the north-west (3v., Toronto, 1894–95)
- Ten years in Winnipeg: A narration of the principal events in the history of the city of Winnipeg from the year A.D. 1870 to the year A.D. 1879, inclusive (with Walter R. Nursey) (Winnipeg, 1879)
- Alexander Begg's Red River Journal and Other Papers Relative to the Red River Resistance of 1869-1870. Edited by William Morton. (Toronto: Champlain Society Publications, 1956)
