= Ste. Agathe, Manitoba =

Sainte Agathe
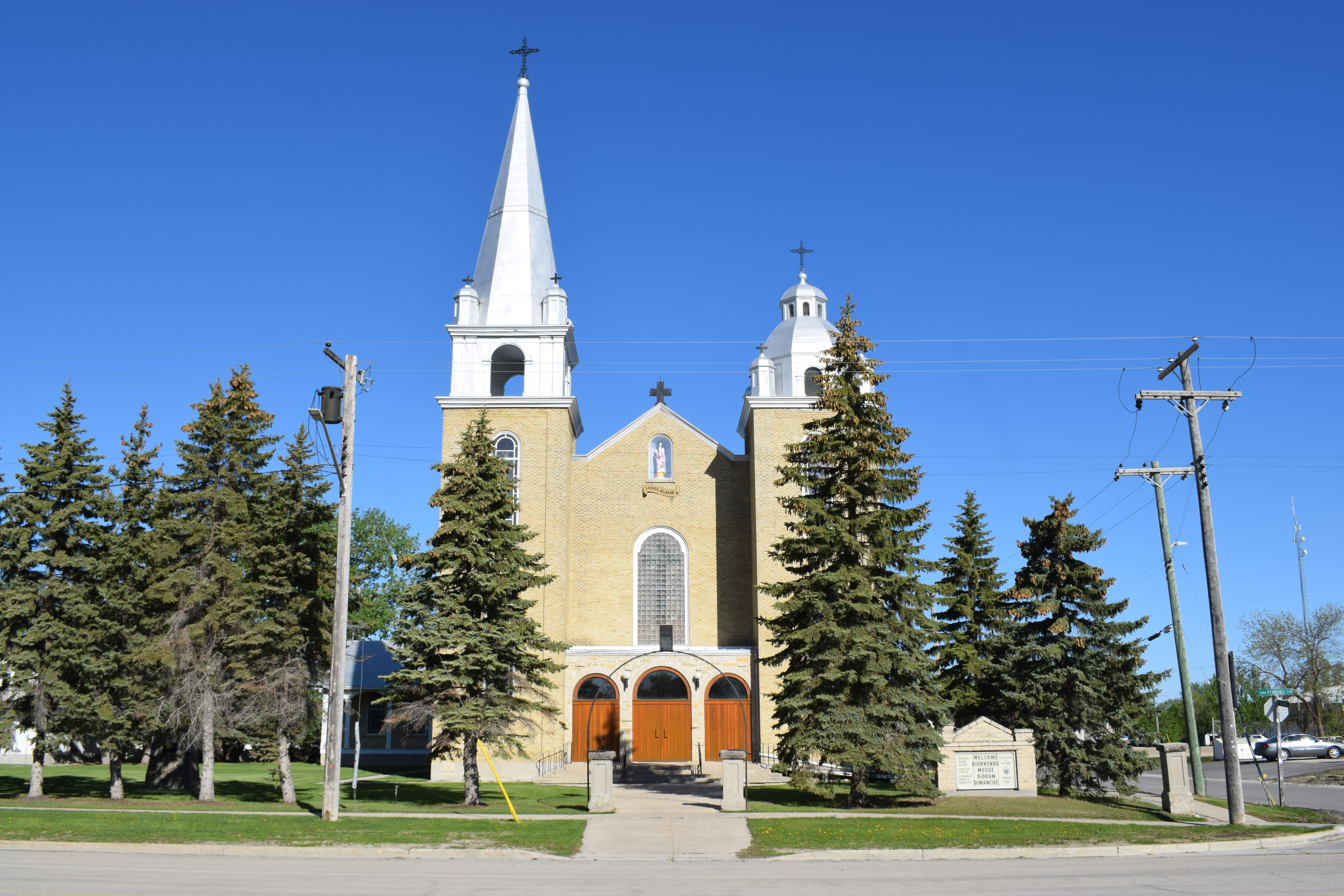
- Ste. Agathe Roman Catholic Church located along the Red River in Ste. Agathe, Manitoba.

- Location of Ste Agathe in Manitoba
- Coordinates: 49°34′06″N 97°10′57″W
- Country: Canada
- Province: Manitoba
- Region: Eastman
- Established: 1876

Government
  - Mayor: Chris Ewen
  - Councillor: Joel Lemoine
  - Governing Body: Rural Municipality of Ritchot
  - MLA (Springfield-Ritchot): Ron Schuler
  - MP (Provencher): Ted Falk
- Elevation: 238 m (781 ft)

Population (2021 Census)
  - Total: 643
- Time zone: UTC-6 (CST)
  - Summer (DST): UTC-5 (CDT)
- Postal Code: R0G 0C9, R0G 1Y0, R0G 1Y1

Ste. Agathe is a primarily francophone community in the Rural Municipality of Ritchot, Manitoba, Canada, located along the Red River.

Ste. Agathe is in the provincial riding of Morris and the federal riding of Provencher.

== History ==
The village was founded in the mid-19th century on one of the Red River Trails by settlers from Quebec named Grouette, who built a homestead on the west bank of the Red River and farmed grain in the rich soil of the valley. A dock allowed other settlers to reach the east side of the river via ferry with their grain-laden Red River carts; a community, originally called Pointe-à-Grouette, formed around the docking point at some time before 1871.

The first mention of the name "Ste. Agathe" was some decades earlier, when the Roman Catholic Church organized the Red River colonies between St. Norbert and the United States border into the Parish of Sainte-Agathe. As that parish grew and split into numerous more manageable parishes, the parish containing Pointe-à-Grouette was renamed the Parish of Sainte-Agathe by Archbishop Alexandre-Antonin Taché in 1873; the town adopted the name at some time after that date. A church, a school, and eventually a convent were built at the townsite.

=== 1997 flood ===
It is located in the floodplain of the Red River and, as such, has always been prone to flood damage, but none was so severe or as notable as that experienced during the 1997 Red River flood. The ring dike surrounding the town gave out in late April, causing the town to be inundated with over two metres of water. The village has recovered; a new dike has been built and an interpretive centre has been created on the west side of the community.

== Demographics ==
In the 2021 Census of Population conducted by Statistics Canada, Ste. Agathe had a population of 643 living in 225 of its 226 total private dwellings, a change of 0.9% from its 2016 population of 637. With a land area of 4.01 km^{2} (1.55 sq mi), it had a population density of 160.3/km^{2} (415.3/sq mi) in 2021.
