= United States Association of Former Members of Congress =

American non-profit organisation

United States Association of Former Members of Congress (FMC)
- Founded: 1970
- Headquarters: Washington, D.C.
- Location: United States
- Key people: Pete Weichlein, CEO
- Affiliations: United States Congress
- Website: usafmc.org

The United States Association of Former Members of Congress, or FMC, is a non-partisan, non-profit organization of over 800 former Members of the United States Congress. FMC is a stand-alone nonprofit 501(c)3 organization that completely self-funds 100% of its programs. No taxpayer dollars are appropriated by Congress to FMC, and all its programs are made possible by Republicans and Democrats volunteering their time pro bono to the organization

== History ==
The United States Association of Former Members of Congress was founded in 1970 as an alumni organization, eventually becoming chartered by The United States Congress in 1983 under Chapter 703 of Title 36 of the United States Code.

== Objectives and activities ==
The objectives of the United States Association of Former Members of Congress, which it seeks to achieve through its various programming, are (i) promoting and educating about public service and The United States Congress, (ii) strengthening representative democracy and (iii) keeping members connected after service.

== Congress to Campus ==
FMC conducts multiple programs throughout the year in the United States to bring citizens together with bipartisan groups of Former Members of the House and Senate. The oldest and most prominent program is Congress to Campus which reaches several dozen university campuses during the academic year, creating dialogue that involves Republicans and Democrats with student audiences on the issues of the day. The Congress to Campus program has been executed for over 40 years, through a partnership with the Stennis Center for Public Service Leadership.

== The Congressional Study Groups ==
FMC is home to The Congressional Study Groups. The Congressional Study Groups are independent, non-partisan international legislative exchanges committed to increasing bilateral and multilateral dialogue with the United States’ strategic allies." There are currently Congressional Study Groups on Germany (formed in 1983), Japan (formed in 1993), Europe (formed in 2012) and Korea (formed in 2018). The four Study Groups bring together current members of the U.S. Congress, and their staff, with government officials, members of civil society, students and other stakeholders to collaborate on transatlantic and transpacific issues between the United States and its trade partners and allies. Leadership of The Congressional Study Groups, such as Tom Petri and Connie Morella have received awards from foreign governments for their work in supporting bilateral relations.

== Leadership ==
As of 2024:

Executive Committee:

- President: Barbara Comstock (R-VA)
- President-Elect: Donna Edwards (D-MD)
- Vice President: Loretta Sanchez (D-CA)
- Vice President: Dennis Ross (R-FL)
- Past President: L.F. Payne (D-VA)

Board of Directors:

- Class of 2021–2024: Larry Bucshon (R-IN), Barbara Comstock (R-VA), Charlie Dent (R-PA), Bart Gordon (D-TN), Doug Jones (D-AL), Derek Kilmer (D-WA), Dennis Ross (R-FL), Loretta Sanchez (D-CA)
- Class of 2022–2025: Rodney Davis (R-IL), Donna Edwards (D-MD), Jim Gerlach (R-PA), Tom Graves (R-GA), Tim Hutchinson (R-AR), Carol Moseley Braun (D-IL), Stephanie Murphy (D-FL), L. F. Payne (D-VA)
- Class of 2023–2026: Russ Carnahan (D-MO), Val Demings (D-FL), Elizabeth Esty (D-CT), Bob Goodlatte (R-VA), Brenda Lawrence (D-MI), Ileana Ros-Lehtinen (R-FL), Peter Roskam (R-IL), Fred Upton (R-MI)
- Class of 2024-2027: Barbara Comstock (R-VA), Charlie Dent (R-PA), Bart Gordon (D-TN), Doug Jones (D-AL), Dennis Ross (R-FL), Loretta Sanchez (D-CA)
- President Emeritus Council (non-voting): Charles Boustany (R-LA), Martin Frost (D-TX), Dennis Hertel (D-MI), Barbara B. Kennelly (D-CT), Larry LaRocco (D-ID), Matthew F. McHugh (D-NY), Connie Morella (R-MD), Jim Slattery (D-KS), Cliff Stearns (R-FL)
- Counselors (non-voting): Bob Carr (D-MI), Bob Clement (D-TN), Byron Dorgan (D-ND), Dan Glickman (D-KS), James R. Jones (D-OK), Ken Kramer (R-CO), Martin Lancaster (D-NC), Jim Moran (D-VA), Tom Petri (R-WI), Olympia Snowe (R-ME), Al Wynn (D-MD)

Co-Chairs of The Congressional Study Groups:

- The Congressional Study Group on Europe: Sen. John Boozman (R-AK), Sen. Chris Murphy (D-CT), Rep. Bill Huizenga (R-MI), Rep. Deborah Ross (D-NC)
- The Congressional Study Group on Germany: Sen. Tim Scott (R-SC), Sen. Jeanne Shaheen (D-NH), Rep. Brendan Boyle (D-PA), Rep. August Pfluger (R-TX)
- The Congressional Study Group on Japan: Sen. Mazie Hirono (D-HI), Sen. Lisa Murkowski (R-AK), Rep. Larry Bucshon (R-IN), Rep. Diana DeGette (D-CO)
- The Congressional Study Group on Korea: Sen. Brian Schatz (D-HI), Sen. Dan Sullivan (R-AK), Rep. Ami Bera (D-CA), Rep. Young Kim (R-CA)
