= Manitoba Provincial Road 213 =

Provincial road in Manitoba, Canada

Provincial Road 213
- Garven Road
- PR 200 highlighted in red

Route information
- Maintained by Manitoba Infrastructure
- Length: 24.2 km (15.0 mi)
- Existed: 1966–present

Major junctions
- West end: PTH 59 near Birds Hill
- PR 206 near Oakbank
- East end: PTH 12 near Anola

Location
- Country: Canada
- Province: Manitoba
- Rural municipalities: East St. Paul; Springfield; Brokenhead

Highway system
- Provincial highways in Manitoba; Winnipeg City Routes
← PR 212	→ PR 214

Provincial Road 213 (PR 213), more commonly known as Garven Road, is a provincial road in the Canadian province of Manitoba. The road is located in the Rural Municipality (RM) of Springfield, with the westernmost part forming part of the boundary between the RMs of Springfield and East St. Paul.

== Route description ==
PR 213 begins at Provincial Trunk Highway (PTH) 59 approximately 5 kilometres (3 mi) northwest of Winnipeg and runs east for a distance of 24 kilometres (15 mi), ending at PTH 12. It is a heavily-used road linking Winnipeg with the communities of Oakbank, Hazelridge, and Cooks Creek, as well as the eastern gate of Birds Hill Provincial Park (via PR 206). Garven Road itself continues as municipal roads from both ends of PR 213, although the road west of PTH 59 is interrupted by the Red River Floodway.

The original course of PR 213 followed Hazelridge Road from PR 206 to PTH 12, which runs parallel 1.6 kilometres (1 mile) south of the current course.

A roundabout is scheduled to be installed at the PR 206/213 junction.

== Major intersections ==
Division	Location	km	mi	Destinations	Notes
East St. Paul		0.0	0.0	PTH 59 – Winnipeg, Grand Beach	Western terminus; road continues west as Garven Road towards Red River Floodway
Springfield	Pine Ridge	2.8	1.7	PR 207 south (Deacon Road)	Northern terminus of PR 207
Springfield		9.3	5.8	PR 206 – Oakbank, Birds Hill Provincial Park	Roundabout
Springfield		14.3	8.9	PR 212 north (Cooks Creek Road) – Cooks Creek	
Springfield		15.0	9.3	Bridge over Cooks Creek	
Springfield	Hazelridge	18.4	11.4	Myrtle Street – Hazelridge	
Springfield		19.2	11.9	Dundee Garson Road – Sapton, Garson	Former PR 306
Springfield		20.8	12.9	Briercliffe Road – Heartland	
Springfield / Brokenhead boundary		24.2	15.0	PTH 12 – Beausejour, Anola	Eastern terminus
1.000 mi = 1.609 km; 1.000 km = 0.621 mi
