= Manitoba Provincial Road 212 =

Provincial road in Manitoba, Canada

Provincial Road 212
- Colville Rd; Ferry Rd; Kitson Rd; Cooks Creek Rd; La Vérendrye Trail
- PR 212 highlighted in red

Route information
- Maintained by Manitoba Infrastructure
- Length: 23.6 km (14.7 mi)
- Existed: 1966–present

Major junctions
- North end: PR 204 in East Selkirk
- PTH 59 in East Selkirk; PTH 44 in Highland Glen
- South end: PR 213 near Hazelridge

Location
- Country: Canada
- Province: Manitoba
- Rural municipalities: Springfield; St. Clements

Highway system
- Provincial highways in Manitoba; Winnipeg City Routes
| ← PR 211 | → PR 213 |

Provincial Road 212 (PR 212) is a north-south provincial road in the Canadian province of Manitoba, connecting East Selkirk with Cooks Creek. Within East Selkirk, between PR 204 and PR 508, PR 212 forms part of the La Vérendrye Trail. Though following a straighter and less direct route, PR 212 follow the general course of Cooks Creek for the majority of its length.

== Route description ==
PR 212 begins at PR 204 between Selkirk and East Selkirk and heads east through East Selkirk to Provincial Trunk Highway 59 (PTH 59). From PTH 59, it continues east and then turns south to PTH 44. From PTH 44, it heads south through Cooks Creek before ending at PR 213 (Garven Road). PR 212 is a paved highway west of PTH 59 and south of PTH 44. The remainder is a gravel road.

Along PR 212 near Cooks Creek is the Immaculate Conception Ukrainian Catholic Church, a Provincial Heritage Site.

== Major intersections ==
| Division | Location | km | mi | Destinations | Notes |
|---|---|---|---|---|---|
| St. Clements | East Selkirk | 0.0 | 0.0 | PR 204 (River Road / W Road / La Vérendrye Trail) – Selkirk, Lockport | Northern terminus; La Vérendrye Trail follows PR 204 south and PR 212 south |
| St. Clements | East Selkirk | 1.5 | 0.93 | Bridge over Cooks Creek | |
| St. Clements | East Selkirk | 1.8 | 1.1 | PR 508 north (St. Peters Road / La Vérendrye Trail) | Southern terminus of PR 508; La Vérendrye Trail follows PR 508 north |
| St. Clements | East Selkirk | 3.7 | 2.3 | PTH 59 – Winnipeg, Grand Beach | Northern end of unpaved section |
| St. Clements | Highland Glen | 12.1 | 7.5 | PTH 44 – Garson, Lockport | Southern end of unpaved section |
| Springfield | Cooks Creek | 16.5 | 10.3 | Bridge over Cooks Creek | |
| Springfield | Cooks Creek | 16.9 | 10.5 | Bridge over Cooks Creek | |
| Springfield | Cooks Creek | 18.5 | 11.5 | Bridge over Cooks Creek | |
| Springfield | | 23.6 | 14.7 | PR 213 (Garven Road) – Hazelridge, Winnipeg | Southern terminus; road continues south as Cooks Creek Road |
1.000 mi = 1.609 km; 1.000 km = 0.621 mi: Concurrency terminus
