= St. Adolphe, Manitoba =

Saint Adolphe
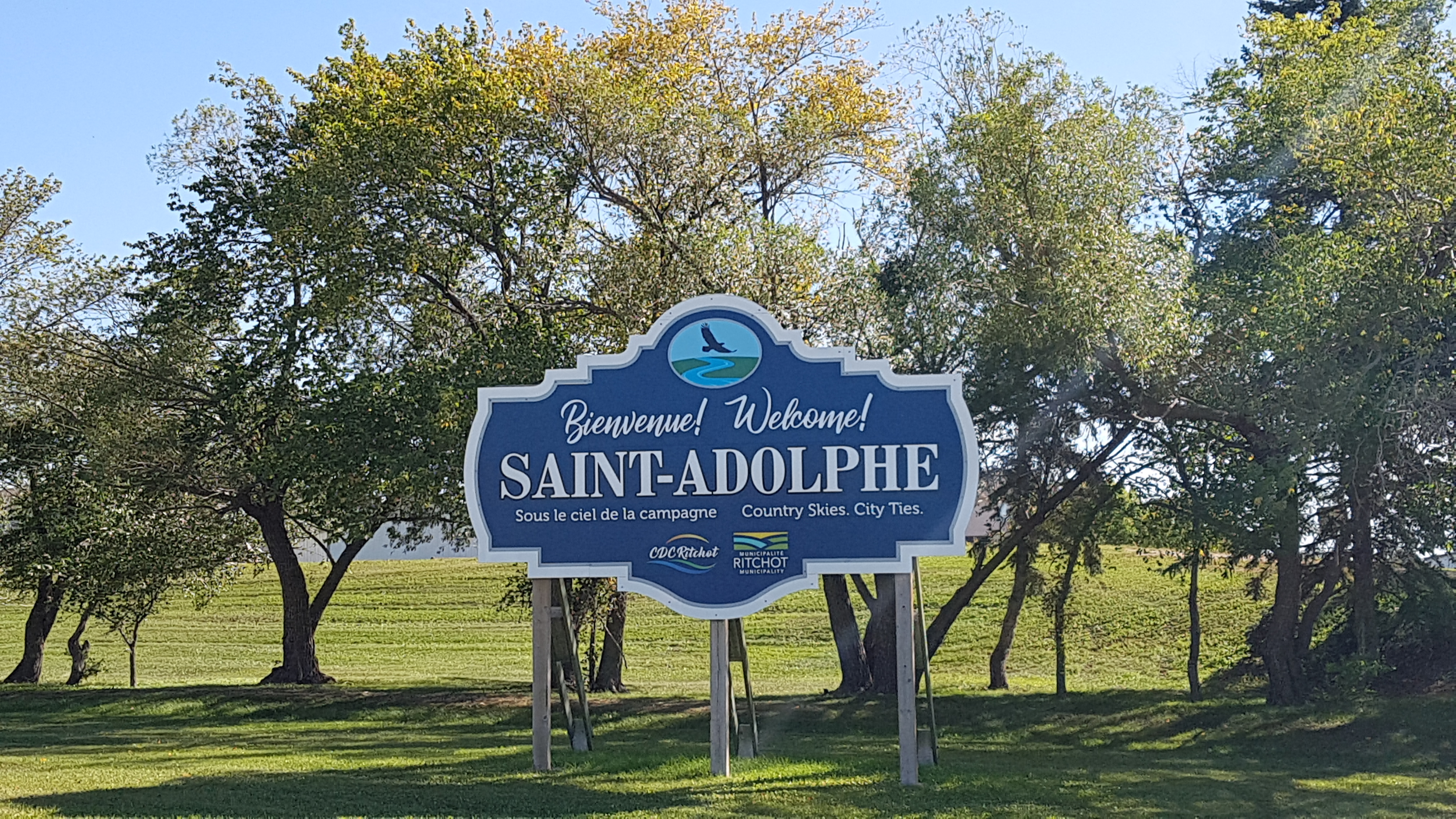
- Welcome Sign of Saint Adolphe

- Location of St. Adolphe in Manitoba
- Coordinates: 49°40′31″N 97°06′35″W
- Country: Canada
- Province: Manitoba
- Region: Eastman
- Established: 1857

Government
  - Mayor: Chris Ewen
  - Councillor (Ward 2): Jason Bodnarchuk
  - Governing Body: R.M. of Ritchot Council
  - MLA (Springfield-Ritchot): Ron Schuler
  - MP (Provencher): Ted Falk

Area
  - Total: 1.74 km^{2} (0.67 sq mi)
- Elevation: 234 m (768 ft)

Population (2021 Census)
  - Total: 1,595
  - Density: 915.8/km^{2} (2,372/sq mi)
- Time zone: UTC-6 (CST)
  - Summer (DST): UTC-5 (CDT)
- Postal Code: R5A 1A1, R5A 1A2, & R5A 1A3, R5A 1A8

St. Adolphe, or Saint Adolphe, originally called Pointe-Coupée, is a community in the Rural Municipality of Ritchot, Manitoba, Canada. It is located along the east bank of the Red River, approximately 12 kilometres (7.5 miles) south of Winnipeg.

It was named after Adolphe Turner, who made a large donation to the local church. St. Adolphe is notable for being home to the world's largest snow maze. The community is surrounded by a dike as a result of several devastating floods, it was raised to levels above the 1997 Red River flood, which was the last major flood to inundate the town and area.

== History ==
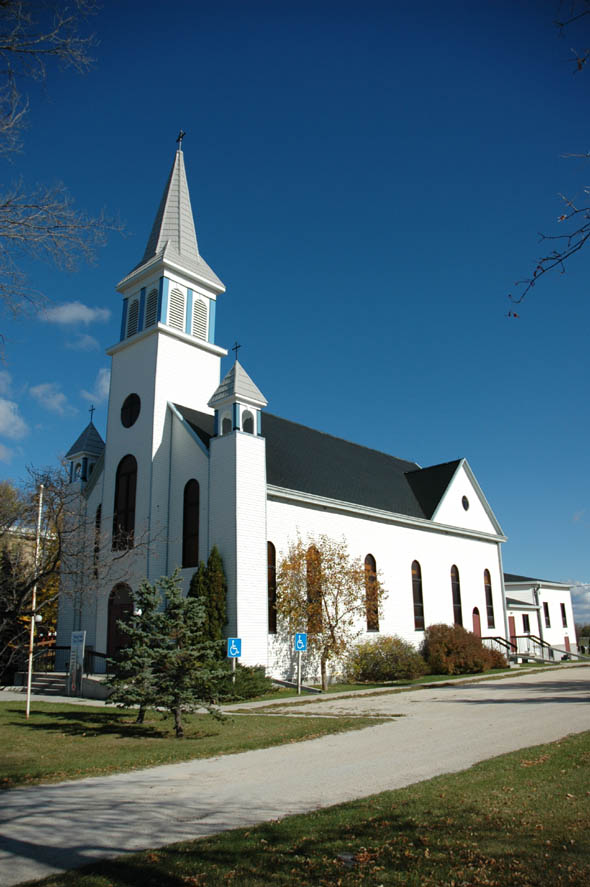
Roman Catholic Church in Saint Adolphe

The area was first settled by the Métis before 1812. They were joined by others who came after the merger of the Hudson's Bay Company and the North West Company and residents from the Red River Colony who arrived after the floods of 1826 and 1852. In 1857, the Parish of St. Norbert was founded which encompassed the then settlements of Pointe-Coupée (now St. Adolphe) and Point-à-Grouette (now Ste. Agathe).

The first school was established in 1865–1866. When the R.M. of Ritchot was founded in 1890, the town was incorporated into it. The post office was opened in 1891, under the name of Dubuc, which changed to St. Adolphe two years later. In 1893, the mission was constructed, and on 10 January 1896, the Parish of St. Adolphe was founded. The School District of St. Adolphe was formed in 1896 as well. In 1906, a group of French nuns from the Filles de la Croix order opened a Roman Catholic convent and school at St. Adolphe which would come to greatly influence the town. The current church was built in 1913. The convent was the site of a reported miracle in 1922, when one of the Sisters, stricken with tuberculosis and near death, miraculously recovered after several days of prayer. The town was connected to the Manitoba Hydro electrical grid in 1939. Two years later, a credit union was built. By 1946, the town had a population of 590. The floods of 1950 and 1966 caused the evacuation of the town, the latter of which prompted the construction of a ring dyke around the town. In 1967, the Sisters converted the school into a nursing home and later sold it in 1972. In 1991, the population of the town stood at 1226, up from 460 in 1971. The former convent served as a personal care home until 2013, at which time it was replaced by a new state-of-the-art facility in the neighbouring town of Niverville. The convent was demolished in June 2017.

== Services and utilities ==
St. Adolphe is serviced by a post office, an indoor hockey arena and community centre, a curling club, two churches, a pharmacy, multiple local businesses and the R.M. of Ritchot's administrative offices.

In 2000, Manitoba Health issued boil-water advisories for the communities of St. Adolphe and Ile-des-Chênes. A CA$6-million fund under the Canada-Manitoba Infrastructure Program was announced in July 2001. The water project involved completely new water supply pipes, distribution pipes, reservoir and pumping equipment. The new system serves more than 700 households in the Ste. Agathe, Ile des Chênes, and rural farmland areas.

== Demographics ==
Historical population
Year	Pop.	±% p.a.
1910	450	—
1946	590	+0.76%
1971	460	−0.99%
1991	1,226	+5.02%
2006	1,048	−1.04%
2011	1,036	−0.23%
2016	1,367	+5.70%
2021	1,595	+3.13%

In the 2021 Census of Population conducted by Statistics Canada, St. Adolphe had a population of 1,006 living in 389 of its 393 total private dwellings, a change of −4.8% from its 2016 population of 1,057. With a land area of 1.38 km^{2} (0.53 sq mi), it had a population density of 729.0/km^{2} (1,888.1/sq mi) in 2021.

As of 2016, roughly 1/3 of the residents have French as their first language.

== Climate ==
Climate data for Glenlea
Month	Jan	Feb	Mar	Apr	May	Jun	Jul	Aug	Sep	Oct	Nov	Dec	Year
Record high °C (°F)	5.5 (41.9)	8.5 (47.3)	16.5 (61.7)	34 (93)	36.5 (97.7)	38 (100)	36.5 (97.7)	38.5 (101.3)	38.5 (101.3)	30 (86)	23.3 (73.9)	10 (50)	38.5 (101.3)
Mean daily maximum °C (°F)	−11.6 (11.1)	−7.7 (18.1)	−0.9 (30.4)	10.7 (51.3)	19.1 (66.4)	23.3 (73.9)	25.5 (77.9)	25.5 (77.9)	18.6 (65.5)	10.6 (51.1)	−0.8 (30.6)	−9.4 (15.1)	8.6 (47.5)
Daily mean °C (°F)	−17.2 (1.0)	−13.3 (8.1)	−6 (21)	4.4 (39.9)	12.2 (54.0)	17 (63)	19.4 (66.9)	18.8 (65.8)	12.5 (54.5)	4.9 (40.8)	−5.3 (22.5)	−14.3 (6.3)	2.8 (37.0)
Mean daily minimum °C (°F)	−22.6 (−8.7)	−19 (−2)	−11.1 (12.0)	−1.9 (28.6)	5.3 (41.5)	10.8 (51.4)	13.2 (55.8)	12.1 (53.8)	6.1 (43.0)	−0.8 (30.6)	−9.7 (14.5)	−19.9 (−3.8)	−3.1 (26.4)
Record low °C (°F)	−43 (−45)	−42 (−44)	−35.5 (−31.9)	−30 (−22)	−11.7 (10.9)	−4.4 (24.1)	1.7 (35.1)	−2.5 (27.5)	−7 (19)	−20.5 (−4.9)	−36.5 (−33.7)	−40 (−40)	−43 (−45)
Average precipitation mm (inches)	16.3 (0.64)	12.5 (0.49)	20.7 (0.81)	27.7 (1.09)	61.5 (2.42)	97.7 (3.85)	91.7 (3.61)	49 (1.9)	43.1 (1.70)	35.7 (1.41)	26.5 (1.04)	21.5 (0.85)	542.7 (21.37)
Source: Environment Canada

Note: This weather data is from the weather station in Glenlea, a community ~5 km from St. Adolphe.

== Infrastructure ==
Road access to St. Adolphe is provided by Saint Mary's Road (Provincial Road 200) which runs north–south and PR 210 which runs east–west. The Pierre Delorme Bridge, the only local crossing over the Red River, links the town with Highway 75 1.4 kilometres (0.87 miles) to the west using PR 210. The bridge replaced a seasonal ferry in 1976, the last ferry to operate on the Red River in Manitoba. In addition, many residents use Highway 75 to commute from and to Winnipeg. St. Adolphe is protected by a ring dyke as the community lies in the Red River Valley, a region prone to major flooding.

== Education ==
École St. Adolphe School is the only school in the town. It has both French Immersion and English classes from Kindergarten to Grade 8. It belongs to Seine River School Division. After Grade 8, students progress to Collège St. Norbert Collegiate. In 2019, the school had an enrolment of approximately 280 children. French speaking families also have the option of sending their children to École Noël Ritchot, a French school located in the community of St. Norbert, approximately 10 minutes north of the town. École Noël Ritchot is operated by the Franco-Manitoban School Division.

== Politics ==
In politics, St. Adolphe is located in the ridings of Provencher (federal), represented by Conservative MP Ted Falk and Springfield-Ritchot (provincial), represented by Progressive Conservative MLA Ron Schuler. As well, St. Adolphe is in Ward 2 of the R.M. of Ritchot, represented by Jason Bodnarchuk. Chris Ewen is currently mayor, after having been elected in a by-election in 2017, acclaimed in the 2018 election and acclaimed in the 2022 election.

== Attractions ==
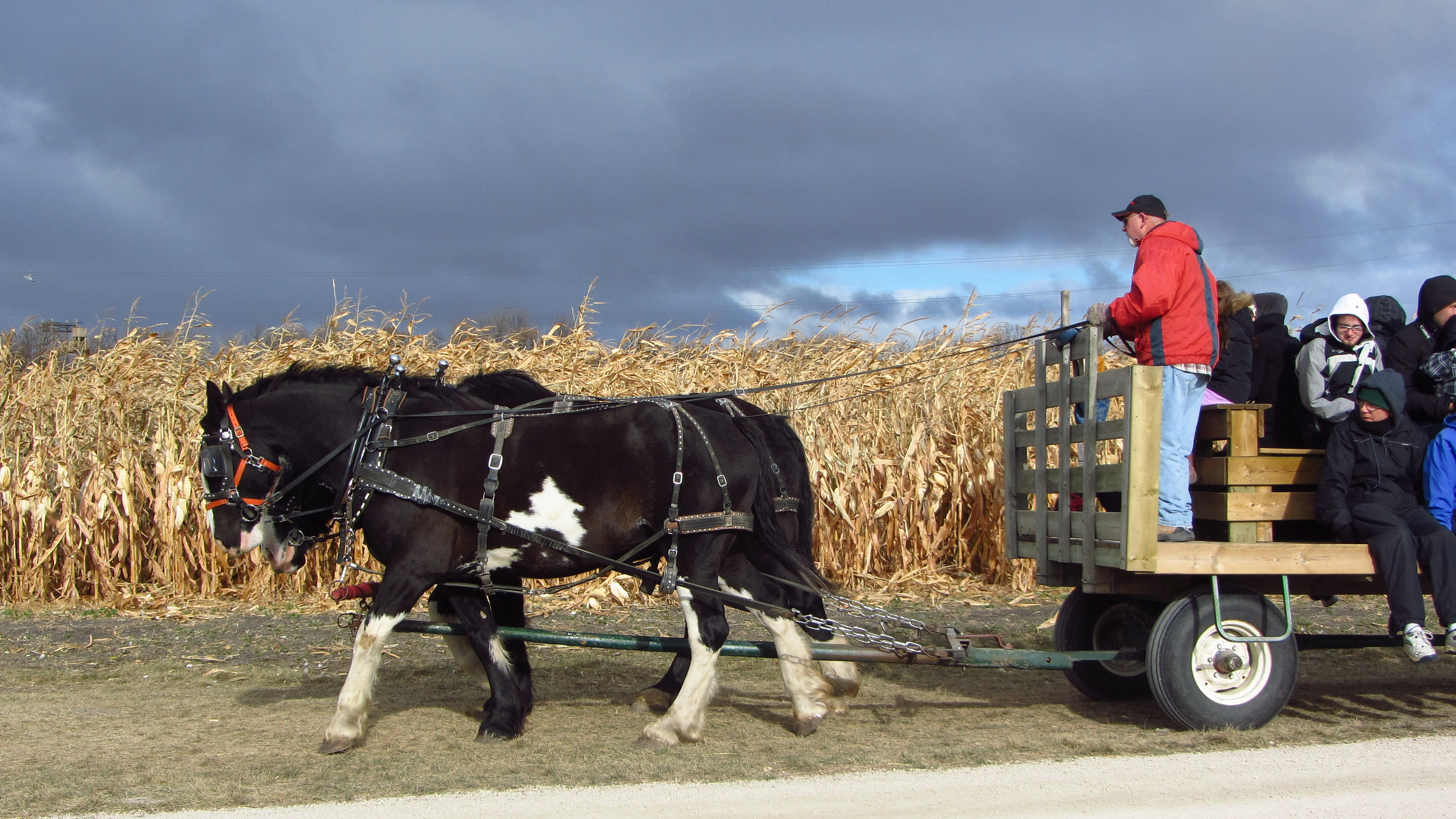
A Maze in Corn

"A Maze in Corn", colloquially known as "The Corn Maze," this business attracts many from across southern Manitoba. Found 2 kilometres (1.2 miles) north of the town, it boasts a large corn maze, six ziplines and other activities. In January 2019, they built the world's largest snow maze at 30,021 ft^{2}, verified by Guinness World Records.

== Notable people ==
- Pierre Delorme, former MP, MLA and provincial cabinet minister
- Shawn Limpright, professional hockey player
- Owen Pickering, professional hockey player
- Stan Roberts, former MLA and President of the Canada West Foundation
