= Glenlea, Manitoba =

Glenlea
- Location of St. Adolphe in Manitoba
- Coordinates: 49°38′08″N 97°08′06″W
- Country: Canada
- Province: Manitoba
- Region: Eastman
- Established: 1925

Government
  - Mayor: Chris Ewen
  - Councillor: Curtis Claydon
  - Governing Body: Rural Municipality of Ritchot
  - MLA (Springfield-Ritchot): Ron Schuler
  - MP (Provencher): Ted Falk
- Elevation: 236 m (774 ft)
- Time zone: UTC-6 (CST)
  - Summer (DST): UTC-5 (CDT)
- Postal Code: R0G 0C5 R0G 0S0

Glenlea is a hamlet in Manitoba, Canada. It is named for the farm of C. H. McWatt, the first postmaster of the community, which in turn was presumably named for his home in Scotland.

A post office was opened 1891, and a Canadian National railway point was first noted in 1902.

It is 15 kilometres (9.3 miles) south of Winnipeg on Highway 75. It is a predominantly Mennonite area and is home to Glenlea Mennonite Church. Glenlea is part of Ward 3 in the R.M. of Ritchot represented by Curtis Claydon. It is also represented by Ron Schuler in the provincial riding of Springfield-Ritchot and Ted Falk in the federal riding of Provencher.

Glenlea was founded by 20 Mennonite families who arrived from the Soviet Union in 1925.
