= Grande Pointe, Manitoba =

Grande Pointe
- Location of Grande Pointe in Manitoba.
- Coordinates: 49.7644°N 97.0514°W
- Country: Canada
- Province: Manitoba
- Region: Eastman
- Municipality: R.M. of Ritchot
- Established: ~1870

Government
  - Mayor: Chris Ewen
  - Councillor (Ward 4): Janine Boulanger
  - Governing Body: R.M. of Ritchot Council
  - MLA (Springfield-Ritchot): Ron Schuler
  - MP (Provencher): Ted Falk
- Elevation: 232 m (761 ft)
- Area codes: Area codes 204 and 431

Grande Pointe is a place in the province of Manitoba, Canada, that is designated as both an unincorporated community and a settlement. It is located 15 km (9.3 mi) southeast of downtown Winnipeg within the Rural Municipality of Ritchot.

== Etymology ==
Grande Pointe, meaning "big point" in French, was named after a nearby bluff on the Seine River where traders once camped.

== History ==
Grande Pointe was founded around 1870, with a dozen families of various backgrounds settled there. The Pembina Branch Line of the Canadian Pacific Railroad, now the CPR Soo Line, was built through the community in 1874, with a rail station built in Grande Pointe in 1878. In 1890, a post office was built, which closed in 1968. A one-room schoolhouse, Riel School #844, was opened in 1894, burned down in 1943 and was replaced that year. The new schoolhouse was later expanded to two rooms, but was closed in 1967. Grande Pointe used to have a meat canning factory and a cheese factory, both of which have closed.

== Flooding ==
Grande Pointe was affected by the 1997 Red River Flood because the homes were not built above 1979 flood levels plus 2 feet. 125 out of 150 homes in the area experienced food damage to their homes, caused by the elevated CPR track acting as a dam.

== Water ==
Additional water infrastructure was constructed in the late 2010s to accommodate growth in the Rural Municipality of Taché, including an additional distribution pipe from Ste. Agathe to Grande Pointe.

== Government ==
=== Federal and provincial representation ===
Grande Pointe is located in the ridings of the federal electoral district of Provencher, represented by Conservative MP Ted Falk, and is part of the provincial electoral district of Springfield-Ritchot, represented by Progressive Conservative MLA Ron Schuler.

=== Local government ===
Grande Pointe is part of Ward 4 in the R.M. of Ritchot, represented by councillor Janine Boulanger. As of 2024, Chris Ewen is mayor, after having been elected in a by-election in 2017 and acclaimed in the 2018 election.

=== Politics ===
In the 1999 provincial election, NDP candidate Ron Lemieux won Dawson Trail, the seat which then contained Grande Pointe, in part because the residents were upset at how the Filmon government handled the 1997 flood in their community.
