= Oakbank, Manitoba =

Oakbank
- Unincorporated community
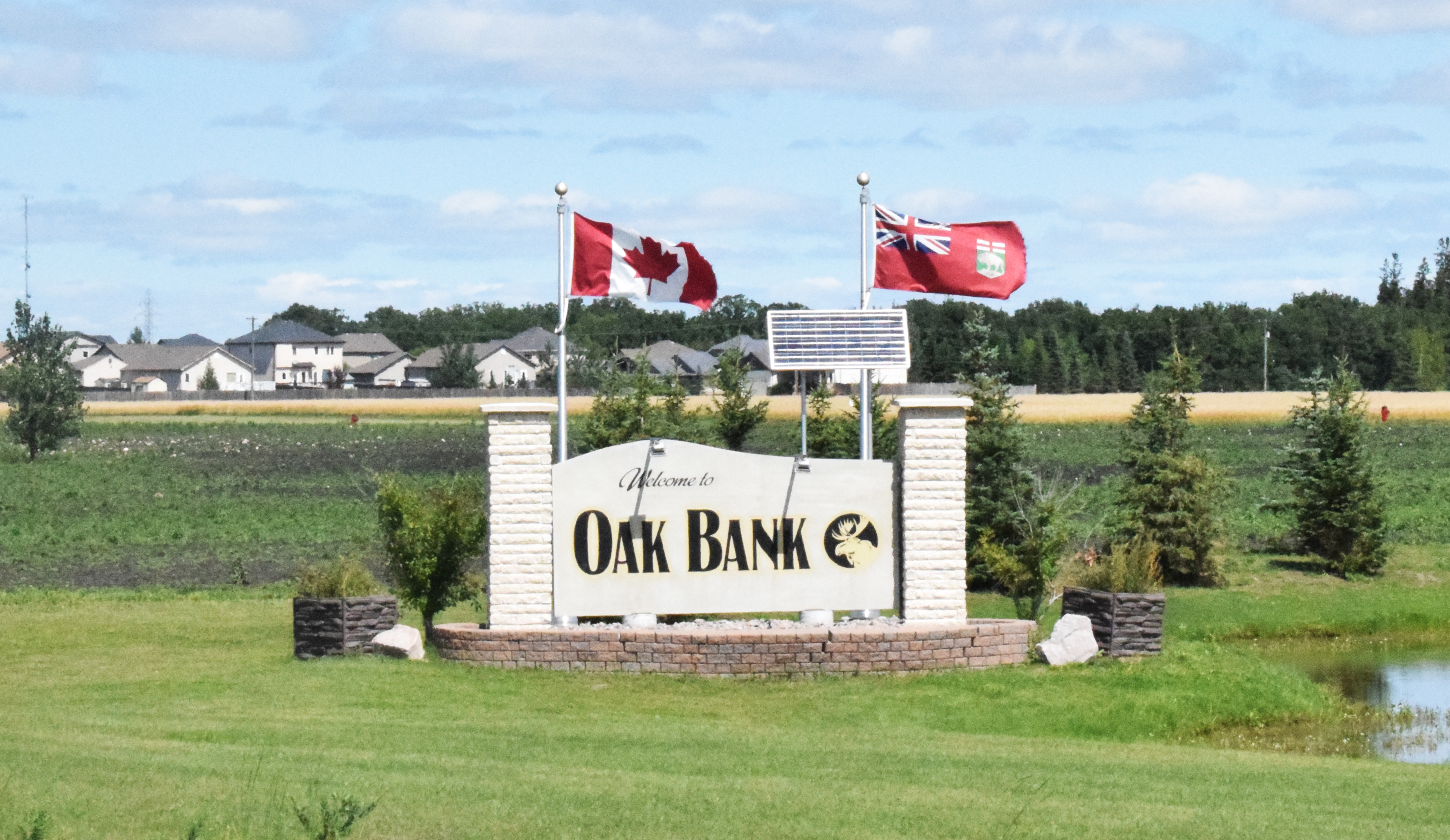
- Welcome sign in Oakbank.

- Location of Oakbank in Manitoba
- Coordinates: 49°56′29″N 96°50′35″W
- Country: Canada
- Province: Manitoba
- Region: Eastman
- Rural Municipality: Springfield

Government
  - MP (Provencher): Ted Falk (CPC)
  - MLA (Springfield-Ritchot): Ron Schuler (PC)

Area
  - Total: 5.38 km^{2} (2.08 sq mi)

Population (2021)
  - Total: 5,041
  - Density: 856.1/km^{2} (2,217/sq mi)
- Time zone: UTC-6 (CST)
  - Summer (DST): UTC-5 (CDT)
- Postal code: R0E 1J0
- FSA: R5N
- Area codes: 204, 431, 584

Oakbank is an unincorporated community in Manitoba, Canada located about 15 km east of the provincial capital Winnipeg, in the Rural Municipality of Springfield.

It has a population of about 5,000, making it the largest unincorporated community in the province of Manitoba. Starting off as a small, largely rural community, Oakbank is now a dormitory town, or bedroom community, for Winnipeg, as a majority of the residents work in that city. Its rapid population growth is representative of small towns in the Winnipeg Capital Region, with two new housing developments being expanded in the town.

== History ==
In 1899, a post office was established in the present location of Oakbank and the village grew around it. In 1901, a Presbyterian church was moved to the community and a Baptist church built in 1908. In 1906, the Canadian Pacific Railway built a track that passed through the village; by 1927 the line was double-tracked. A train station existed until 1968. Electricity was supplied by the Winnipeg Electric Company starting in 1930. Rural electrification did not reach the surrounding area until 1949. In 1887, a telephone was installed in the home of the municipal secretary treasurer. Various private telephone companies, often with only a dozen subscribers, operated until they were all absorbed by Manitoba Telephone System in 1950. In 1964, local school divisions were consolidated and Oakbank became the local center for elementary, junior high and high school students, against many people's wishes. A local manual telephone exchange was in operation until 1966 when an automatic exchange was installed. A credit union was founded in the village in 1945.

Oakbank continues rapid growth as a bedroom community with many residents commuting to Winnipeg for work.

== Demographics ==
Population Growth
Year	Pop.	±%
2006	2,427	—
2011	3,474	+43.1%
2016	4,604	+32.5%
2021	5,041	+9.5%

== Notable people ==
- Drew Bagnall, former National Hockey League player
- Matt Bailey, professional ice hockey player
- Dean Haglund, actor
- Brett Howden, National Hockey League player (Vegas Golden Knights)
- Quinton Howden, professional ice hockey player, formerly in the National Hockey League
