= Rural Municipality of Springfield =

Rural municipality in Manitoba, Canada

Springfield
- Rural municipality
- Rural Municipality of Springfield
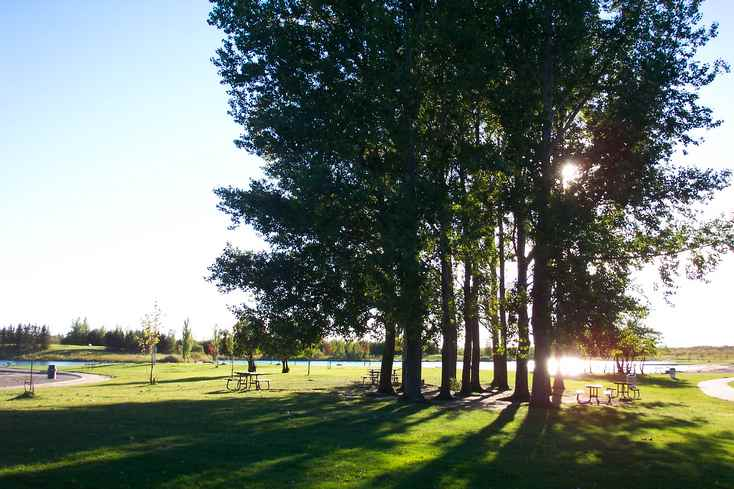
- Birds Hill Provincial Park located northwest of Springfield

- Location of the RM of Springfield in Manitoba
- Coordinates: 49°55′45″N 96°41′38″W
- Country: Canada
- Province: Manitoba
- Region: Eastman and Winnipeg Metro
- Incorporated: 1880

Government
  - Mayor: Patrick Therrien
  - MLAs: Ron Schuler (Springfield-Ritchot); Bob Lagassé (Dawson Trail)
  - MPs: James Bezan (Selkirk—Interlake—Eastman); Ted Falk (Provencher)

Area
  - Rural municipality: 1,096.17 km^{2} (423.23 sq mi)
  - Metro: 530,679 km^{2} (204,896 sq mi)
- Elevation: 242 m (794 ft)

Population (2021)
  - Rural municipality: 16,142
  - Density: 14.726/km^{2} (38.140/sq mi)
  - Metro: 778,489
- Time zone: UTC−6 (CST)
  - Summer (DST): UTC−5 (CDT)
- Postal Code: R5L, R5M, R5N, R5P, R5R, R5T
- Area codes: 204, 431
- Website: www.rmofspringfield.ca

Springfield is a rural municipality (RM) in Manitoba, Canada. It stretches from urban industrial development on the eastern boundary of the city of Winnipeg, through urban, rural residential, agricultural and natural landscapes, to the Agassiz Provincial Forest on the municipality's eastern boundary. Birds Hill Provincial Park nestles into the north-western corner of Springfield.

Springfield's population was 16,142 as of the 2021 census, making it the second most populous RM in the province (slightly behind the RM of Hanover) and fifth most populous municipality overall (behind the cities of Winnipeg, Brandon, and Steinbach, and RM of Hanover).

== History ==
The Springfield area is part of the traditional territory of Anishnaabe and Swampy Cree First Nations. In 1870, the area became part of the new province of Manitoba. In 1871, the area was covered under Treaty 1 between the British Crown and the First Nations. The treaty facilitated the settlement of southern Manitoba including agricultural settlements in the Springfield area.

Springfield was incorporated in 1880 as a result of changes made to the Rural Municipality of Springfield and Sunnyside (1873–1880). The municipality received its name due to the presence of multiple natural springs found within its borders. While farming is still important in the municipality, today many residents are employed in nearby Winnipeg.

== Communities ==
- Anola
- Cooks Creek
- Dugald
- Glass
- Hazelridge
- Oakbank
- Ostenfeld
- Pine Ridge
- Sapton
- Vivian

== Demographics ==
In the 2021 Census of Population conducted by Statistics Canada, Springfield had a population of 16,142 living in 5,795 of its 5,992 total private dwellings, a change of 5.2% from its 2016 population of 15,342. With a land area of 1,096.17 km^{2} (423.23 sq mi), it had a population density of 14.7/km^{2} (38.1/sq mi) in 2021.

Historical population

Year	Pop.	±%
1891	1,000	—
1896	1,367	+36.7%
1901	2,585	+89.1%
1911	5,015	+94.0%
1921	5,666	+13.0%
1931	6,486	+14.5%
1941	6,863	+5.8%
1951	5,375	−21.7%
1956	5,120	−4.7%
1961	5,608	+9.5%
1966	5,670	+1.1%

Year	Pop.	±%
1971	5,955	+5.0%
1976	6,944	+16.6%
1981	8,986	+29.4%
1986	9,836	+9.5%
1991	11,102	+12.9%
1996	12,162	+9.5%
2001	12,602	+3.6%
2006	12,990	+3.1%
2011	14,069	+8.3%
2016	15,342	+9.0%
2021	16,142	+5.2%

Panethnic groups in the Rural Municipality of Springfield (2001−2021)
Panethnic group	2021		2016		2011		2006		2001	
Panethnic group	Pop.	%	Pop.	%	Pop.	%	Pop.	%	Pop.	%
European (Note: Statistic includes all persons that did not make up part of a visible minority or an indigenous identity.)	13,625	86.51%	13,260	88.22%	12,675	92.42%	12,055	93.09%	11,855	94.39%
Indigenous	1,770	11.24%	1,410	9.38%	890	6.49%	740	5.71%	595	4.74%
African	100	0.63%	115	0.77%	55	0.4%	85	0.66%	35	0.28%
East Asian (Note: Statistic includes total responses of "Chinese", "Korean", and "Japanese" under visible minority section on census.)	75	0.48%	35	0.23%	20	0.15%	50	0.39%	20	0.16%
Southeast Asian (Note: Statistic includes total responses of "Filipino" and "Southeast Asian" under visible minority section on census.)	60	0.38%	120	0.8%	30	0.22%	0	0%	20	0.16%
South Asian	50	0.32%	55	0.37%	0	0%	10	0.08%	20	0.16%
Middle Eastern (Note: Statistic includes total responses of "West Asian" and "Arab" under visible minority section on census.)	15	0.1%	20	0.13%	0	0%	0	0%	10	0.08%
Latin American	10	0.06%	15	0.1%	10	0.07%	10	0.08%	10	0.08%
Other/multiracial (Note: Statistic includes total responses of "Visible minority, n.i.e." and "Multiple visible minorities" under visible minority section on census.)	35	0.22%	10	0.07%	10	0.07%	0	0%	25	0.2%
Total responses	15,750	97.57%	15,030	97.97%	13,715	97.48%	12,950	99.69%	12,560	99.67%
Total population	16,142	100%	15,342	100%	14,069	100%	12,990	100%	12,602	100%
Note: Totals greater than 100% due to multiple origin responses

== Attractions ==
The RM of Springfield contains many sites of historical and cultural significance such as the Sunnyside cemetery, the Springfield Hutterite colony, North Springfield school, Springfield Agricultural Society, and the Dugald rail accident site.

In 1996, the Ukrainian Catholic Church of the Immaculate Conception in Cooks Creek was designated a National Historic Site of Canada.

== Government ==
=== Municipal ===
Springfield's administrative center is in Oakbank, the largest community in the RM. The RM is governed by a mayor and councillors representing the RM's five wards. The government has come under some media scrutiny for having the highest compensation to mayor and council ($242,974 total for 2015) relative to all other municipalities in the Winnipeg capital region.

=== Provincial ===
The RM is represented by two ridings in the Manitoba Legislative Assembly: Springfield-Ritchot (west) and Dawson Trail (east). The former Springfield electoral district included all of the RM and parts of adjacent East St. Paul.

=== Federal ===
The RM is split between two federal ridings: Selkirk—Interlake—Eastman (north) and Provencher (south). From 1914 through 1966, a federal riding was also called "Springfield" with varying boundaries not always coterminous with the municipality.
