= Breastfeeding by transgender people =

Breastfeeding (sometimes referred to as chestfeeding) of human infants can be carried out by trangender women, men and non-binary people. In cases that there are biological challenges in order to lactate, breastfeeding can be achieved through induced lactation.

== Characteristics ==
All sexes can lactate, including by methods of lactation induction.

A research article has stated that lactation among transgender women can help affirm their "sense of womanhood". A qualitative study found that by transgender women have had "their feeling of closeness with their child had been strengthened by breastfeeding".

== History ==
A 2018 study by Tamar Reisman and Zil Goldstein reported the "first formal report in the medical literature of induced lactation in a transgender woman". Three years prior, Trevor Kirczenow and colleagues published a study of twenty-two transgender people, sixteen of which breastfed their babies.

The term "breastfeeding" has been used in order to account for how transgender men and non-binary people feed their infants. A Canadian study found that a quarter of transgender people identify as parents.
