= Dawson Trail (electoral district) =

Provincial electoral district in Manitoba, Canada

Coordinates: 49.687°N 96.652°W

Manitoba electoral district

Provincial electoral district
- Legislature: Legislative Assembly of Manitoba
MLA
Bob Lagassé
Independent
- District created: 2008
- First contested: 2011
- Last contested: 2023

Demographics
- Population (2016): 23,230
- Electors (2019): 14,386
- Area (km²): 1,698
- Pop. density (per km²): 13.7
- Census division: Division 2
- Census subdivision(s): Ritchot, Ste. Anne, Taché

Dawson Trail (French: Chemin-Dawson) is a provincial electoral district of Manitoba Canada. It was created by redistribution in 2008, out of parts of Morris and La Verendrye.

Communities in the riding include Ste. Anne, Lorette, Landmark, Grande Pointe, Giroux, Hazelridge, Anola, and Sapton. St. Adolphe and Ile des Chênes were previously located in the riding until redistribution in 2018.

The riding's population in 2006 was 19,530.

== Members of the Legislative Assembly ==
Assembly	Years	Member	Party
Riding created from La Verendrye and Morris
40th	2011-2016	Ron Lemieux	New Democratic
41st	2016–2019	Bob Lagassé	Progressive Conservative
42nd	2019–2023	Bob Lagassé	Progressive Conservative
43rd	2023–2026	Bob Lagassé	Progressive Conservative
43rd	2026–present	Bob Lagassé	Independent

== Election results ==
=== 2011 ===
2011 Manitoba general election
Party	Candidate	Votes	%	Expenditures
New Democratic	Ron Lemieux	4,291	52.55	$27,025.87
Progressive Conservative	Laurent "Larry" Tetrault	3,554	43.52	$31,739.93
Liberal	Sandra Hoskins	321	3.93	$930.06
Total valid votes		8,166	–	
Rejected		48	–	
Eligible voters / turnout		14,118	58.18	
Source(s) Source: Manitoba. Chief Electoral Officer (2011). Statement of Votes for the 40th Provincial General Election, October 4, 2011 (PDF) (Report). Winnipeg: Elections Manitoba. "Election Returns: 40th General Election". Elections Manitoba. 2011.

=== 2016 ===
2016 Manitoba general election
Party	Candidate	Votes	%	±%	Expenditures
Progressive Conservative	Bob Lagassé	4,330	52.96	9.44	$28,988.69
New Democratic	Roxane Dupuis	1,678	20.52	-32.02	$28,310.57
Liberal	Terry Hayward	1,652	20.21	16.27	$12,386.01
Manitoba	David Sutherland	516	6.31	–	$2,489.77
Total valid votes		8,176	–	–	
Rejected		138	–		
Eligible voters / turnout		14,561	57.10	-1.08	
Source(s) Source: Manitoba. Chief Electoral Officer (2016). Statement of Votes for the 41st Provincial General Election, April 19, 2016 (PDF) (Report). Winnipeg: Elections Manitoba. "Election Returns: 41st General Election". Elections Manitoba. 2016.

=== 2019 ===
2019 Manitoba general election
Party	Candidate	Votes	%	±%	Expenditures
Progressive Conservative	Bob Lagassé	4,555	55.41	2.45	$10,313.59
Liberal	Robert Rivard	1,880	22.87	2.67	$6,688.18
New Democratic	Echo Asher	1,785	21.72	1.19	$2,019.24
Total valid votes		8,220	–	–	
Rejected		101	–		
Eligible voters / turnout		14,386	57.84	0.74	
Source(s) Source: Manitoba. Chief Electoral Officer (2019). Statement of Votes for the 42nd Provincial General Election, September 10, 2019 (PDF) (Report). Winnipeg: Elections Manitoba. "Candidate Election Returns". Elections Manitoba. Elections Manitoba.

=== 2023 ===
2023 Manitoba general election
Party	Candidate	Votes	%	±%	Expenditures
Progressive Conservative	Bob Lagassé	4,592	50.70	-4.71	$20,743.64
New Democratic	Chris Wiebe	4,049	44.71	+22.99	$15,476.68
Green	Marcel Broesky	416	4.59	–	$0.00
Total valid votes/expense limit		9,057	99.24	–	$62,568.00
Total rejected and declined ballots		69	0.76	–	
Turnout		9,126	56.86	-0.98	
Eligible voters		16,049			
Progressive Conservative hold		Swing		-13.85	
Source(s) Source: Elections Manitoba

== See also ==
- List of Manitoba provincial electoral districts
- Canadian provincial electoral districts
