= Dawson Trail =

Dawson Trail may refer to:

- Old Dawson Trail, an old land and water route between Ontario and Manitoba
- Dawson Trail (electoral district), in Manitoba, Canada
