= Corey Koskie =

Canadian baseball player (born 1973)

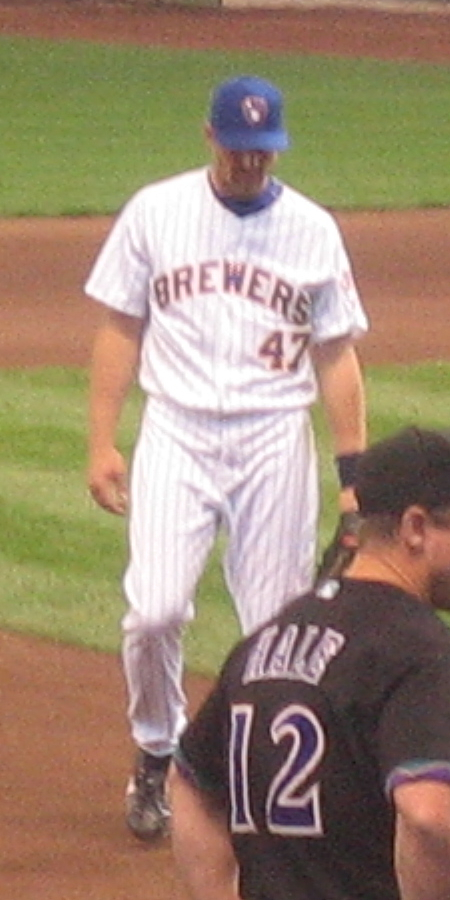
- Koskie with the Brewers in 2006
- Third baseman
- Born: June 28, 1973 (age 52); Anola, Manitoba, Canada
- Batted: Left Threw: Right

MLB debut
- September 9, 1998, for the Minnesota Twins

Last MLB appearance
- July 5, 2006, for the Milwaukee Brewers

MLB statistics
- Batting average: .275
- Home runs: 124
- Runs batted in: 506
- Stats at Baseball Reference

Teams
- Minnesota Twins (1998–2004); Toronto Blue Jays (2005); Milwaukee Brewers (2006)

Career highlights and awards
- Minnesota Twins Hall of Fame

Member of the Canadian

Baseball Hall of Fame
- Induction: 2015

Cordel Leonard "Corey" Koskie (born June 28, 1973) is a Canadian former professional baseball third baseman, who played in Major League Baseball for the Minnesota Twins, Toronto Blue Jays, and Milwaukee Brewers. On February 4, 2015, Koskie was elected to the Canadian Baseball Hall of Fame.

== Early life ==
Koskie was born in Anola, Manitoba. He was the first Manitoba-born-and-raised player to ever reach the Major Leagues, and the first Manitoba-born player in MLB since Bud Sketchley in 1942. Koskie grew up on a farm in Anola and practiced baseball by hitting rocks with a wiffle ball bat. He took lessons in Ukrainian dance as a child.

Koskie's primary sports in his youth were ice hockey and volleyball. He played junior hockey for the Selkirk Steelers and was recruited to play college hockey at Minnesota-Duluth but chose instead to play volleyball for Garth Pischke at the University of Manitoba.

Koskie left the Manitoba Bisons in his second year, to play college baseball at Des Moines Area Community College in Boone, Iowa. He subsequently began playing at the National Baseball Institute in British Columbia.

== Baseball career ==
Koskie was drafted by the Minnesota Twins in the 26th round of the 1994 Major League Baseball draft, and subsequently made his MLB debut on September 9, 1998.

He established himself in 1999 as the Twins' third baseman of the future by hitting .310 and knocking in 58 runs.

In 2000, he batted .300 with a .400 on-base percentage and in 2001 had his most productive offensive season when he hit 26 home runs, had 103 RBI, and scored 100 runs.

Koskie signed a three-year, $17-million contract with the Toronto Blue Jays on December 14, 2004. An injury-plagued 2005 season cut his productivity and playing time, as he struggled with a .249 average, with 11 home runs, 36 RBI, and 4 stolen bases in 97 games. Despite his frequent injuries, Koskie was regarded as one of the more athletic third basemen in the game.

On January 6, 2006, he was traded by the Blue Jays to the Milwaukee Brewers for pitcher Brian Wolfe. The deal was widely viewed as a salary dump for the Blue Jays after the team traded for Troy Glaus. With several players on the roster capable of playing third base (Koskie, Glaus, Eric Hinske, Shea Hillenbrand, and Aaron Hill) and no assurances of regular playing time from Blue Jays general manager J.P. Ricciardi, Koskie was traded just a year after being the Blue Jays' 2004 offseason marquee free agent signing.

While the Brewers acquired a veteran infielder with a solid glove and bat to anchor their very young infield, Koskie's later seasons were marred by injuries, including missing most of the 2006 season with post-concussion syndrome from an injury he received on July 5, 2006.

"If I can't play, I at least want my life back", he said. "I'm hoping to do something to help the team this year. I want to play baseball again. If I can play baseball, I know I'm fine." The injury caused him to miss the entire 2007 season.

In 2009, Koskie worked out at the Minnesota Twins spring training camp and played for Team Canada in the World Baseball Classic. On February 28, Koskie signed a minor league deal with an invitation to spring training with the Chicago Cubs. On March 21, 2009, Koskie announced his retirement. While confident in his abilities, he did not want to risk his health. His fear of injury led to a diagnosis of post traumatic stress disorder.

== Post-retirement ==
Koskie was a Planet Fitness franchisee in the Minneapolis–Saint Paul area from 2010 to 2016. He recounted his experiences in a January 29, 2016 article for The Players' Tribune. As of 2016, Koskie lived in Plymouth, Minnesota with his wife and their four sons.

Koskie was inducted into the Manitoba Sports Hall of Fame in 2013. Koskie was added to the Minnesota Twins Hall of Fame August 17, 2025.

Koskie has been an active player in the Minnesota Baseball Association (MN Townball) for the Loretto Larks alongside three of his sons since 2021.

Awards
Preceded by Bob Smith	Topps Rookie All-Star Third Baseman; 1999	Succeeded by Mike Lamb
