= Niverville, Manitoba =

Niverville
- Motto: Where you belong
- Town boundaries

- Location of Niverville
- Coordinates: 49°36′20″N 097°02′30″W
- Country: Canada
- Province: Manitoba
- Region: Eastman, RM of Hanover and Winnipeg Metropolitan Region
- Established: 1874
- Incorporated: 1969 (village); 1993 (town)

Government
  - Mayor: Myron Dyck
  - Governing Body: Town Council
  - MP (Provencher): Ted Falk
  - MLA (Springfield-Ritchot): Ron Schuler

Area
  - Total: 8.70 km^{2} (3.36 sq mi)
- Elevation: 236 m (774 ft)

Population (2021)
  - Total: 5,947
  - Density: 683.7/km^{2} (1,771/sq mi)
- Time zone: UTC-6 (CST)
  - Summer (DST): UTC-5 (CDT)
- Postal Code: R0A 1E0, R0A 0A1, & R0A 0A2
- Website: whereyoubelong.ca

Niverville is a town in the Winnipeg Metropolitan Region, Manitoba, Canada. The town lies between the northwest corner of the Rural Municipality of Hanover and the southeastern portion of the Rural Municipality of Ritchot. Niverville's population as of the 2021 census is 5,947, making it the largest town and 10th-largest community in Manitoba.

== History ==
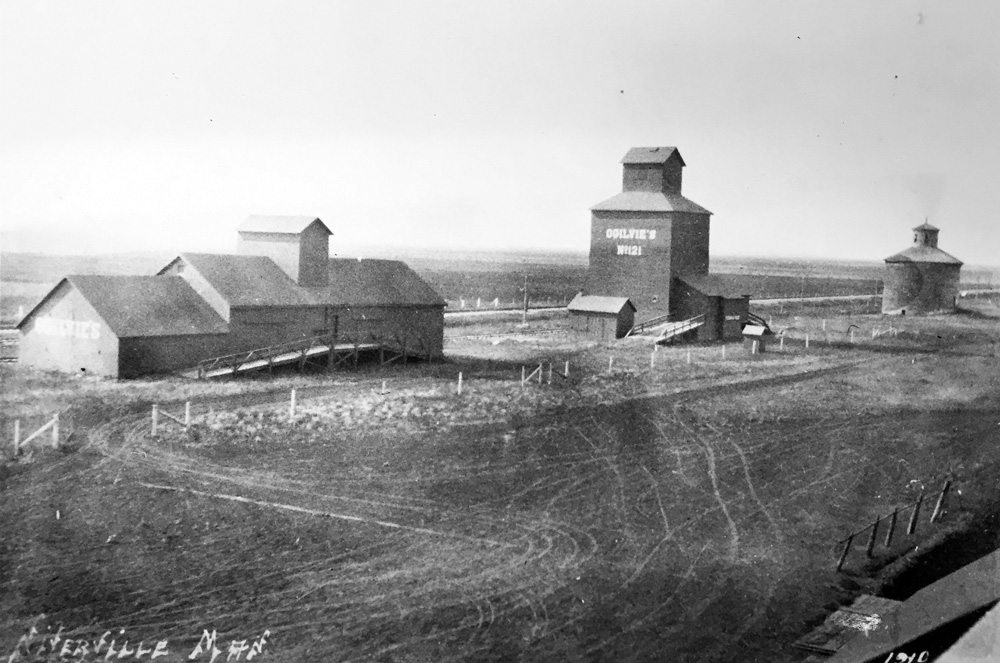
Grain elevators in Niverville, 1911

In 1874, after the establishment of the Mennonite East Reserve, William Hespeler, who had recruited Mennonites to the area, saw the opportunity to develop a rail station to supply the new Mennonite settlements, at a location selected by railway tycoon Joseph Whitehead. Initially the town that grew up around the station was named Hespeler, but eventually became known by the name of the railway station, Niverville, after 18th-century explorer and fur trader Chevalier Joseph Boucher de Niverville.

The first grain elevator in western Canada, a unique round structure was built in Niverville in 1879 by Hespeler.

Originally within the Rural Municipality of Hanover, Niverville was incorporated as a village in 1969. In 1970, Niverville was host to the Niverville Pop Festival, the first rock festival in Manitoba.

Niverville has expanded on multiple occasions through annexation of land from the Rural Municipality of Ritchot to the west and Hanover to the east and north. It was incorporated as a town in 1993. Many inhabitants today are Mennonite or British, with a growing number of immigrants of other backgrounds. In recent years, Niverville has grown into a "bedroom community" of Winnipeg and is among the fastest growing towns in the province.

== Geography ==
Niverville lies in the Red River Valley. It is located at the crossing of Provincial Road 311 and the CPR Emerson rail line, between Provincial Road 200 and Provincial Trunk Highway 59.

== Demographics ==
In the 2021 Census of Population conducted by Statistics Canada, Niverville had a population of 5,947 living in 1,971 of its 2,010 total private dwellings, a change of 29% from its 2016 population of 4,610. With a land area of 8.7 km^{2} (3.4 sq mi), it had a population density of 683.6/km^{2} (1,770.4/sq mi) in 2021.

Historical population
Year	Pop.	±%
1971	938	—
1976	1,251	+33.4%
1981	1,329	+6.2%
1986	1,452	+9.3%
1991	1,514	+4.3%
1996	1,731	+14.3%
2001	1,921	+11.0%
2006	2,464	+28.3%
2011	3,540	+43.7%
2016	4,610	+30.2%
2021	5,947	+29.0%

Panethnic groups in the Town of Niverville (2001−2021)
Panethnic group	2021		2016		2011		2006		2001	
Panethnic group	Pop.	%	Pop.	%	Pop.	%	Pop.	%	Pop.	%
European (Note: Statistic includes all persons that did not make up part of a visible minority or an indigenous identity.)	4,700	80.2%	3,745	82.04%	3,075	89.13%	2,140	87.17%	1,865	97.14%
Indigenous	740	12.63%	520	11.39%	285	8.26%	290	11.81%	55	2.86%
African	125	2.13%	60	1.31%	0	0%	10	0.41%	10	0.52%
Southeast Asian (Note: Statistic includes total responses of "Filipino" and "Southeast Asian" under visible minority section on census.)	110	1.88%	145	3.18%	40	1.16%	10	0.41%	0	0%
South Asian	90	1.54%	10	0.22%	0	0%	0	0%	0	0%
East Asian (Note: Statistic includes total responses of "Chinese", "Korean", and "Japanese" under visible minority section on census.)	10	0.17%	30	0.66%	0	0%	0	0%	0	0%
Latin American	10	0.17%	10	0.22%	0	0%	10	0.41%	0	0%
Middle Eastern (Note: Statistic includes total responses of "West Asian" and "Arab" under visible minority section on census.)	0	0%	25	0.55%	0	0%	0	0%	0	0%
Other/multiracial (Note: Statistic includes total responses of "Visible minority, n.i.e." and "Multiple visible minorities" under visible minority section on census.)	65	1.11%	25	0.55%	30	0.87%	0	0%	0	0%
Total responses	5,860	98.54%	4,565	99.02%	3,450	97.46%	2,455	99.63%	1,920	99.95%
Total population	5,947	100%	4,610	100%	3,540	100%	2,464	100%	1,921	100%
Note: Totals greater than 100% due to multiple origin responses

== Economy ==
Niverville's economy is based on agriculture and construction as the town has become a bedroom community for Winnipeg. Employers include the Great GORP Project (Food Industry), Spectis Moulders (polyurethane architectural products), Maple Leaf Foods (agribusiness), William Dyck and Sons (hardware store and lumberyard), Wiens Furniture (furniture, appliance and bedding retailer) and Niverville Credit Union.

== Arts and culture ==
Niverville host an annual Niverville Olde Tyme Country Fair, which is held the second weekend of June.

Niverville's Community Resource and Recreation Centre (CRRC) is the community's main indoor recreation complex that houses an athletic fieldhouse and an ice hockey arena that is home to the Niverville Nighthawks of the Manitoba Junior Hockey League and Niverville Clipper ice hockey teams. The town's other recreational facilities include the Niverville Centennial Arena, Niverville Curling Club, an outdoor tennis court located at Niverville Middle School, a fitness and dance gym, a nine-hole golf course, and Hespeler Park. The Crow Wing Trail also runs through the town.

A heritage wall documenting Niverville's history was opened on Main Street in 2021. A museum documenting local history is located on the second floor of the CRRC. A Red River Ox Cart replica, which represents the vehicle that Mennonite settlers used to arrive in the area and interact with the local Métis at the time of founding of Niverville, stands outside the Centennial Arena.

== Government ==
The town is governed by a mayor and council elected by the residents. The current mayor is Myron Dyck. Niverville lies within the federal riding of Provencher; the current MP for this riding is Ted Falk. At the provincial level, Niverville has been part of several different ridings as boundaries have changed over the years. Currently, Niverville is part of the Springfield-Ritchot electoral district, represented by Ron Schuler.

== Infrastructure ==
Niverville improved its Water Treatment Plant in 2012, expanding the reservoir to 1.2 megalitres.

In June 2017, hot, dry weather caused higher water usage, and town notified residents to cut back on water usage because the reservoir could not be replenished quickly enough. A new well field opened in 2017 to prevent future water shortages.

== Education ==
Niverville schools are part of the Hanover School Division. Niverville Elementary School (K-4), Niverville Middle School (5-8), and Niverville High School (9-12) provide education for the students of Niverville and surrounding area. Niverville High School (NHS) replaced the former Niverville Collegiate Institute (NCI) in 2019.

== Notable people ==
- David Bergen, novelist
- K.R. Byggdin, novelist
- Amanda Lindsey Cook, Christian recording artist
- William Hespeler, town founder
- Jordan St. Cyr, Christian recording artist

== See also ==
- List of francophone communities in Manitoba
