= Bob Lagassé =

Canadian politician

Bob Lagassé MLA

Member of the Legislative Assembly of Manitoba for Dawson Trail
- Incumbent
- Assumed office April 19, 2016
- Preceded by: Ron Lemieux

Personal details
- Born: February 4, 1973 (age 53)
- Party: Independent (2026-present)
- Other political affiliations: Progressive Conservative (until March 2026)
- Occupation: Foster parent, social service sector worker

Bob Lagassé is a Canadian provincial politician, who was elected as the Member of the Legislative Assembly of Manitoba for the riding of Dawson Trail in the 2016 election. He currently sits as an independent.

== Political career ==
At his constituency's nomination meeting in 2015, Lagassé pulled off a surprise upset victory by defeating three high-profile candidates, including former Association of Manitoba Municipalities president Doug Dobrowoski, to earn the nomination in the constituency. Lagassé is known for his sleeve-length tattoo and earrings, which is considered unique for the fact the riding of Dawson Trail is known for a strong conservative demographic. Lagassé is of French and Métis origin.

He was re-elected in the 2019 and 2023 provincial elections. On October 24, 2023, he was appointed as the Shadow Minister for Mental Health and the Shadow Minister for Francophone Affairs.

== Electoral record ==
2023 Manitoba general election: Dawson Trail
| Party | Candidate | Votes | % | ±% | Expenditures |
|---|---|---|---|---|---|
| Progressive Conservative | Bob Lagassé | 4,592 | 50.70 | -4.71 | $20,743.64 |
| New Democratic | Chris Wiebe | 4,049 | 44.71 | +22.99 | $15,476.68 |
| Green | Marcel Broesky | 416 | 4.59 | – | $0.00 |
| Total valid votes/expense limit | | 9,057 | 99.24 | +0.45 | $62,568.00 |
| Total rejected and declined ballots | | 69 | 0.76 | – | |
| Turnout | | 9,126 | 56.86 | -0.98 | |
| Eligible voters | | 16,049 | | | |
| Progressive Conservative hold | | Swing | | -13.85 | |
Source(s) Source: Elections Manitoba

2019 Manitoba general election: Dawson Trail
| Party | Candidate | Votes | % | ±% | Expenditures |
|---|---|---|---|---|---|
| Progressive Conservative | Bob Lagassé | 4,555 | 55.41 | 2.45 | $10,313.59 |
| Liberal | Robert Rivard | 1,880 | 22.87 | 2.67 | $6,688.18 |
| New Democratic | Echo Asher | 1,785 | 21.72 | 1.19 | $2,019.24 |
| Total valid votes | | 8,220 | 98.79 | +0.45 | |
| Rejected | | 101 | 1.21 | | |
| Eligible voters / turnout | | 14,386 | 57.84 | +0.74 | |
Source(s) Source: Manitoba. Chief Electoral Officer (2019). Statement of Votes for the 42nd Provincial General Election, September 10, 2019 (PDF) (Report). Winnipeg: Elections Manitoba. "Candidate Election Returns". Elections Manitoba. Elections Manitoba.

2016 Manitoba general election: Dawson Trail
| Party | Candidate | Votes | % | ±% | Expenditures |
|---|---|---|---|---|---|
| Progressive Conservative | Bob Lagassé | 4,330 | 52.96 | 9.44 | $28,988.69 |
| New Democratic | Roxane Dupuis | 1,678 | 20.52 | -32.02 | $28,310.57 |
| Liberal | Terry Hayward | 1,652 | 20.21 | 16.27 | $12,386.01 |
| Manitoba | David Sutherland | 516 | 6.31 | – | $2,489.77 |
| Total valid votes | | 8,176 | 98.34 | -1.07 | |
| Rejected and declined ballots | | 138 | 1.66 | | |
| Eligible voters / turnout | | 14,561 | 57.10 | -1.08 | |
Source(s) Source: Manitoba. Chief Electoral Officer (2016). Statement of Votes for the 41st Provincial General Election, April 19, 2016 (PDF) (Report). Winnipeg: Elections Manitoba. "Election Returns: 41st General Election". Elections Manitoba. 2016.
