= Rural Municipality of Ritchot =

Rural municipality in Manitoba, Canada

Ritchot
- Rural Municipality
- Rural Municipality of Ritchot
- Location of the RM of Ritchot in Manitoba
- Coordinates: 49°39′53″N 97°07′00″W
- Country: Canada
- Province: Manitoba
- Region: Eastman
- Incorporation: November 1, 1890

Government
  - Mayor: Chris Ewen
  - MP: Ted Falk
  - MLA: Ron Schuler

Area
  - Total: 333.55 km^{2} (128.78 sq mi)
- Elevation: 231 m (758 ft)

Population (2021)
  - Total: 7,469
  - Density: 22.39/km^{2} (58.00/sq mi)
- Time zone: UTC−6 (CST)
  - Summer (DST): UTC−5 (CDT)
- Postal Code: R5A
- Area codes: Area codes 204 and 431
- Website: ritchot.com

The Rural Municipality of Ritchot (French: Municipalité rurale de Ritchot) is a rural municipality (RM) in the Winnipeg Capital Region, bordering the south side of Winnipeg in Manitoba, Canada. The separately-administered town of Niverville lies adjacent to its southeast, between it and the Rural Municipality of Hanover.

== Water ==
Due to population growth within the RM, an application to expand and improve the water distribution system was made in 2017. The C$5 million project would involve twinning of the distribution pipe between Ste. Agathe and St. Adolphe, twinning of the distribution pipe between Ste. Agathe and Grande Pointe, expansion of the Water Treatment Plant tank to store 1 additional megalitre, and a wider pipe to allow for a 50-litre per second flow from the well.

== Climate ==
Climate data for Glenlea
Month	Jan	Feb	Mar	Apr	May	Jun	Jul	Aug	Sep	Oct	Nov	Dec	Year
Record high °C (°F)	5.5 (41.9)	8.5 (47.3)	16.5 (61.7)	34 (93)	36.5 (97.7)	38 (100)	36.5 (97.7)	38.5 (101.3)	38.5 (101.3)	30 (86)	23.3 (73.9)	10 (50)	38.5 (101.3)
Mean daily maximum °C (°F)	−11.6 (11.1)	−7.7 (18.1)	−0.9 (30.4)	10.7 (51.3)	19.1 (66.4)	23.3 (73.9)	25.5 (77.9)	25.5 (77.9)	18.6 (65.5)	10.6 (51.1)	−0.8 (30.6)	−9.4 (15.1)	8.6 (47.5)
Daily mean °C (°F)	−17.2 (1.0)	−13.3 (8.1)	−6 (21)	4.4 (39.9)	12.2 (54.0)	17 (63)	19.4 (66.9)	18.8 (65.8)	12.5 (54.5)	4.9 (40.8)	−5.3 (22.5)	−14.3 (6.3)	2.8 (37.0)
Mean daily minimum °C (°F)	−22.6 (−8.7)	−19 (−2)	−11.1 (12.0)	−1.9 (28.6)	5.3 (41.5)	10.8 (51.4)	13.2 (55.8)	12.1 (53.8)	6.1 (43.0)	−0.8 (30.6)	−9.7 (14.5)	−19.9 (−3.8)	−3.1 (26.4)
Record low °C (°F)	−43 (−45)	−42 (−44)	−35.5 (−31.9)	−30 (−22)	−11.7 (10.9)	−4.4 (24.1)	1.7 (35.1)	−2.5 (27.5)	−7 (19)	−20.5 (−4.9)	−36.5 (−33.7)	−40 (−40)	−43 (−45)
Average precipitation mm (inches)	16.3 (0.64)	12.5 (0.49)	20.7 (0.81)	27.7 (1.09)	61.5 (2.42)	97.7 (3.85)	91.7 (3.61)	49 (1.9)	43.1 (1.70)	35.7 (1.41)	26.5 (1.04)	21.5 (0.85)	542.7 (21.37)
Source: Environment Canada

== Demographics ==
In the 2021 Census of Population conducted by Statistics Canada, Ritchot had a population of 7,469 living in 2,712 of its 2,769 total private dwellings, a change of 11.8% from its 2016 population of 6,679. With a land area of 332.23 km^{2} (128.27 sq mi), it had a population density of 22.5/km^{2} (58.2/sq mi) in 2021.

Although once it was predominantly French, 35.4% of the municipality's population spoke French in 2016. Mother tongue (2021):

- English as first language: 70.4%
- French as first language: 18.3%
- English and French as first languages: 2.9%
- Other as first language: 7.0%

Historical population

Year	Pop.	±%
1871	600	—
1881	1,100	+83.3%
1891	960	−12.7%
1896	2,001	+108.4%
1901	2,365	+18.2%
1911	1,861	−21.3%
1921	1,880	+1.0%
1931	2,146	+14.1%
1941	2,624	+22.3%
1951	2,177	−17.0%
1956	2,134	−2.0%
1961	2,509	+17.6%

Year	Pop.	±%
1966	2,817	+12.3%
1971	2,946	+4.6%
1976	3,768	+27.9%
1981	4,262	+13.1%
1986	4,588	+7.6%
1991	5,146	+12.2%
1996	5,248	+2.0%
2001	4,958	−5.5%
2006	5,051	+1.9%
2011	5,478	+8.5%
2016	6,678	+21.9%
2021	7,469	+11.8%

Panethnic groups in the Rural Municipality of Ritchot (2001−2021)
Panethnic group	2021		2016		2011		2006		2001	
Panethnic group	Pop.	%	Pop.	%	Pop.	%	Pop.	%	Pop.	%
European (Note: Statistic includes all persons that did not make up part of a visible minority or an indigenous identity.)	5,760	77.26%	5,255	78.73%	4,405	80.68%	4,430	87.72%	4,470	90.58%
Indigenous	1,360	18.24%	1,080	16.18%	980	17.95%	600	11.88%	440	8.92%
African	110	1.48%	80	1.2%	35	0.64%	10	0.2%	10	0.2%
South Asian	105	1.41%	90	1.35%	0	0%	0	0%	0	0%
Southeast Asian (Note: Statistic includes total responses of "Filipino" and "Southeast Asian" under visible minority section on census.)	75	1.01%	70	1.05%	0	0%	0	0%	0	0%
East Asian (Note: Statistic includes total responses of "Chinese", "Korean", and "Japanese" under visible minority section on census.)	0	0%	60	0.9%	25	0.46%	0	0%	0	0%
Latin American	0	0%	25	0.37%	0	0%	10	0.2%	0	0%
Middle Eastern (Note: Statistic includes total responses of "West Asian" and "Arab" under visible minority section on census.)	0	0%	20	0.3%	0	0%	10	0.2%	0	0%
Other/multiracial (Note: Statistic includes total responses of "Visible minority, n.i.e." and "Multiple visible minorities" under visible minority section on census.)	25	0.34%	25	0.37%	0	0%	0	0%	10	0.2%
Total responses	7,455	99.81%	6,675	99.94%	5,460	99.67%	5,050	99.98%	4,935	99.54%
Total population	7,469	100%	6,679	100%	5,478	100%	5,051	100%	4,958	100%
Note: Totals greater than 100% due to multiple origin responses

== Government ==
Ritchot is a municipal style government with four councillors and one head of council, known as the mayor. The four councillors represent wards. Ward 1 is formed by the Île des Chênes area, Ward 2 by the St. Adolphe area, Ward 3 by the areas south of PR 210 including Ste. Agathe and Ward 4 by the areas north of PR 210, including Howden and Grande Pointe. The municipal offices are located in St. Adolphe.

=== Members ===
The council of the RM include:

- Mayor: Chris Ewen
- Councillor/Deputy Mayor: Shane Pelletier (Ward 1)
- Councillor: Jason Bodnarchuk (Ward 2)
- Councillor: Joel Lemoine (Ward 3)
- Councillor: Janine Boulanger (Ward 4)

== Communities ==
- Glenlea
- Grande Pointe
- Howden
- Île-des-Chênes
- St. Adolphe
- Ste. Agathe

== See also ==
- List of francophone communities in Manitoba
