= Trevor Kirczenow =

Canadian politician (born 1985)

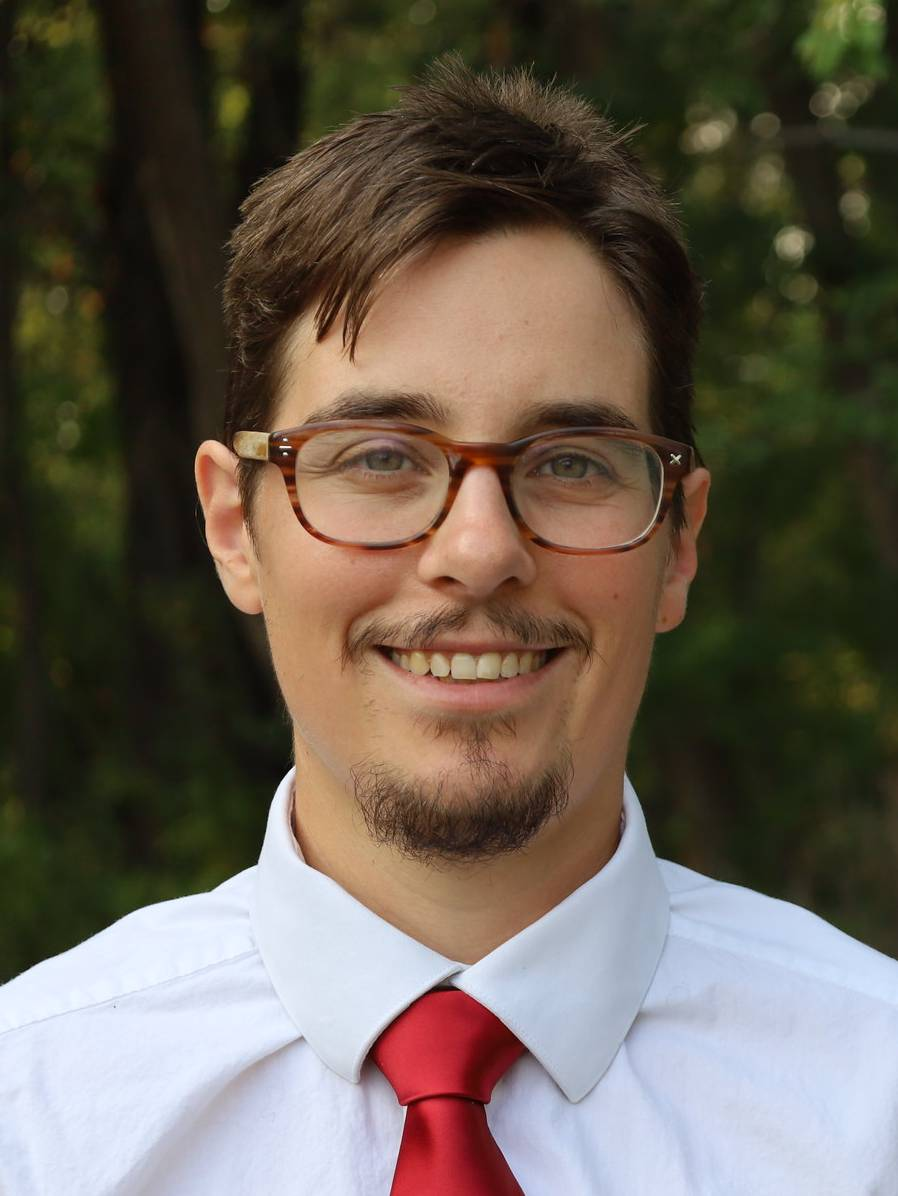
- Kirczenow in 2021
- Born: 1985 (age 40–41); Canada
- Occupations: Healthcare researcher and advocate, author, politician
- Notable work: Where's the Mother?
- Website: trevorkirczenow.liberal.ca www.milkjunkies.net

Trevor MacDonald (née Kirczenow; born 1985) is a transgender health researcher and diabetes healthcare advocate. He is an author and community organizer in the field of LGBTQ lactation and infant feeding. He has run three times as a candidate for the Liberal Party of Canada.

== Biography ==
Kirczenow earned a Bachelor of Political Science honours degree from the University of British Columbia.

=== Research ===
In 2014, Kirczenow formed a research team through the University of Ottawa which obtained funding from the Canadian Institutes of Health Research to conduct qualitative research about transmasculine individuals' experiences of pregnancy, birthing, and feeding their newborns.

The group's research paper, "Transmasculine individuals’ experiences with lactation, chestfeeding, and gender identity: a qualitative study," contains the first known use of the word "chestfeeding" in the title of an academic paper, which is a term preferred by some transmasculine individuals to describe their lactation and nursing relationship.

Kirczenow says "There is this assumption that goes along with the ‘born in the wrong body’ narrative, that if you are a trans guy you would want a hysterectomy and never use your body to carry a pregnancy." He noted that none of the participants' surgeons discussed the potential for future chestfeeding before performing top surgery, and that "the range of experiences and showing more nuance, more complexity, about transgender lives is what is most important in this study."

=== Federal politics ===
Kirczenow was the first openly transgender candidate to have been nominated by a major Canadian political party for a federal election. He ran for the Liberal Party candidate for Provencher in the 2019 Canadian federal election, the 2021 Canadian federal election, and the 2025 Canadian federal election, finishing second each time.

=== Pregnancy and birth ===
Having been assigned female at birth, Kirczenow transitioned to male by taking testosterone and undergoing chest surgery. When he and his partner decided to start a family, on advice from a doctor, Kirczenow stopped hormone therapy and was able to become pregnant. Although Kirczenow did not plan to breastfeed and assumed it would not be possible, he decided to try after learning that "even a small amount of milk could be really valuable to my baby," and that "breastfeeding is about more than the milk. It can be a relationship too and a whole way of parenting."

=== Application for La Leche League leadership ===
Before his child was born, Kirczenow (under his married name, MacDonald), sought peer-to-peer support from his local chapter of La Leche League (LLL), the international breastfeeding organization. He was later asked to assume a volunteer leadership position. However, La Leche League Canada (LLLC) rejected his query, saying "the topic has never arisen in the 56-year history of our organization" and "since an LLLC leader is a mother who breastfed a baby, a man cannot become an LLLC leader."

The board of La Leche League International (LLLI) reviewed the policy, citing its mandate to be a "nondiscriminatory service organization." A year later, they revised their policy to allow leaders to serve no matter their gender. LLLI spokesperson Diana West commented, "It was thought that only women could breastfeed. Once it became clear it wasn’t as straightforward as that, the policy had to change. We’re just trying to be on the right side of history. Yes, we took a year to do it, but we did it in a way that was fair and unequivocal."

In 2016, Kirczenow became the first-ever transgender man to be accredited as a La Leche League leader. LLLI said to other leaders: "We recognize that any breastfeeding parent, regardless of whether they self-identify as a mother or father, should be – and is now – welcome to investigate LLL Leadership. There are other prerequisites that a potential Leader needs to satisfy, but being a woman isn't one of them.”

=== Community organization and advocacy ===
In 2012, Kirczenow founded the international advocacy and support group, "Birthing and Breast or Chestfeeding Trans People and Allies". The group currently has over 6800 members.

After his son was diagnosed with Type 1 diabetes, Kirczenow co-founded the advocacy group Emergency Diabetes Support for Manitobans in 2020, advocating for improved coverage in Manitoba and a national Pharmacare plan for people who cannot afford lifesaving medication. The group was successful in lobbying for continuous glucose monitors and improvements to insulin pump coverage from the province.

=== Midwifery care for trans clients ===
In 2015, several commentators claimed that Kirczenow, who was attended by midwives during his pregnancies, had forced the Midwives Alliance of North America (MANA) to stop using gendered language such as "mothers" and "pregnant women." However, Snopes reported that while MANA did change some of the language in their core materials to clarify they welcomed transgender and cisgender clients in their scope of practice, those decisions were based on their own standards of care, inclusion, and position on gender identity, and not due to pressure from Kirczenow or any other trans people.

Following MANA's announcement, a group of midwives penned an open letter to MANA protesting what they viewed as "the erasure of women from the language of birth." Kirczenow wrote a response in the Huffington Post saying that "trans, genderqueer and intersex people have been giving birth for as long as women-identified people have" and "it is possible to be inclusive." Several other associations of midwives subsequently issued statements supportive of MANA and gender nonconforming clients.

== Works ==
Kirczenow, under his married last name MacDonald, has written for The Guardian, The Advocate, the Huffington Post, Out Magazine and This Magazine. He is a public speaker about transgender people and reproductive health, including lactation.

He is first author on the first peer-reviewed medical research article on the subject of transmasculine infant chestfeeding.

Kirczenow is the author of a tip sheet for volunteer leaders who are providing support to transgender, transsexual, and genderfluid individuals who wish to nurse their babies and was profiled in La Leche League International's magazine, Breastfeeding Today.

Kirczenow's 2016 biography Where's the Mother? Stories from a Transgender Dad has been added to the required reading list for Doula Trainings International, who commented that the book is "eye-opening for new and seasoned doulas alike." It was reviewed by Publishers Weekly as "frank, clever, and easy to process ... a refreshing and insightful narrative." The work has also received coverage in The New York Times, The Guardian, The Toronto Star, Buzzfeed, Gay Star News, Metro UK, The Advocate, Rewire, and on the Canadian Television Network's national newscast.

== Electoral record ==
2025 Canadian federal election: Provencher
Party	Candidate	Votes	%	±%	Expenditures
Conservative	Ted Falk	34,364	66.34	+18.00	
Liberal	Trevor Kirczenow	13,394	25.86	+9.36	
New Democratic	Brandy Schmidt	2,398	4.63	–7.58	
People's	Noël Gautron	942	1.82	–15.67	
Green	Blair Mahaffy	705	1.36	–1.20	
Total valid votes/expense limit		51,803	99.27		
Total rejected ballots		383	0.73		
Turnout		52,186	71.73		
Eligible voters		72,752			
Conservative notional hold		Swing		+4.32	
Source: Elections Canada

2023 Manitoba general election: Springfield-Ritchot
Party	Candidate	Votes	%	±%	Expenditures
Progressive Conservative	Ron Schuler	5,752	54.89	-4.59	$32,727.68
New Democratic	Tammy Ivanco	3,827	36.52	+15.73	$5,175.20
Liberal	Trevor Kirczenow	900	8.59	+0.05	$285.00
Total valid votes/expense limit		10,479	99.37	–	$70,572.00
Total rejected and declined ballots		66	0.63	–	
Turnout		10,545	58.30	-2.27	
Eligible voters		18,089			
Progressive Conservative hold		Swing		-10.16	
Source(s) Source: Elections Manitoba

2021 Canadian federal election: Provencher
Party	Candidate	Votes	%	±%	Expenditures
Conservative	Ted Falk	24,294	48.7	-17.2	$83,776.96
Liberal	Trevor Kirczenow	8,472	17.0	+3.9	$25,158.99
People's	Nöel Gautron	8,168	16.4	+14.2	$24,179.71
New Democratic	Serina Pottinger	6,270	12.6	-0.2	$0.00
Independent	Rick Loewen	1,366	2.7	N/A	$0.00
Green	Janine G. Gibson	1,272	2.6	-3.4	$1,596.00
Total valid votes/expense limit		49,901	99.5	–	$117,118.32
Total rejected ballots		355	0.5		
Turnout		50,156	67.4		
Eligible voters		74,468			
Conservative hold		Swing		-10.6	
Source: Elections Canada

2019 Canadian federal election: Provencher
Party	Candidate	Votes	%	±%	Expenditures
Conservative	Ted Falk	31,821	65.9	+9.84	$91,792.89
Liberal	Trevor Kirczenow	6,347	13.1	-21.56	$13,417.34
New Democratic	Erin McGee	6,187	12.8	+7.50	none listed
Green	Janine G. Gibson	2,884	6.0	+2.02	none listed
People's	Wayne Sturby	1,066	2.2		none listed
Total valid votes/expense limit		48,305	100.0		
Total rejected ballots		322			
Turnout		48,627	70.5		
Eligible voters		68,979			
Conservative hold		Swing		+7.85	
Source: Elections Canada
