= Springfield-Ritchot =

Provincial electoral district in Manitoba, Canada

Manitoba electoral district

Provincial electoral district
- Legislature: Legislative Assembly of Manitoba
MLA
Ron Schuler
Progressive Conservative
- District created: 2018
- First contested: 2019
- Last contested: 2023

Demographics
- Population (2016): 21,985
- Electors (2019): 15,822
- Area (km²): 780
- Pop. density (per km²): 28.2
- Census division(s): Division No. 2, Division No. 12
- Census subdivision(s): Hanover, Morris, Niverville, Ritchot, Springfield

Springfield-Ritchot is a provincial electoral district of Manitoba, Canada, that came into effect at the 2019 Manitoba general election. It contains the RM of Ritchot, Niverville, and the west of the RM of Springfield. In 2019, it elected Ron Schuler to the Legislative Assembly of Manitoba.

The riding was created by the 2018 provincial redistribution out of parts of St. Paul, La Verendrye, Dawson Trail, and Morris.

== Election results ==
=== 2023 ===
2023 Manitoba general election
Party	Candidate	Votes	%	±%	Expenditures
Progressive Conservative	Ron Schuler	5,752	54.89	-4.59	$32,727.68
New Democratic	Tammy Ivanco	3,827	36.52	+15.73	$5,175.20
Liberal	Trevor Kirczenow	900	8.59	+0.05	$285.00
Total valid votes/expense limit		10,479	99.37	–	$70,572.00
Total rejected and declined ballots		66	0.63	–	
Turnout		10,545	58.30	-2.27	
Eligible voters		18,089			
Progressive Conservative hold		Swing		-10.16	
Source(s) Source: Elections Manitoba

=== 2019 ===
2019 Manitoba general election
Party	Candidate	Votes	%	±%	Expenditures
Progressive Conservative	Ron Schuler	5,670	59.48	-7.2	$44,481.26
New Democratic	Sam Okoi	1,982	20.79	+5.6	$1,451.32
Green	Garrett Hawgood	1,066	11.18	+10.1	$672.14
Liberal	Sara Mirwaldt	814	8.54	-6.3	$0.00
Total valid votes		9,532	99.47		
Rejected		50	0.53		
Eligible voters / turnout		15,822	60.56		
Progressive Conservative hold		Swing		-6.4	
Source(s) Source: Manitoba. Chief Electoral Officer (2019). Statement of Votes for the 42nd Provincial General Election, September 10, 2019 (PDF) (Report). Winnipeg: Elections Manitoba. "Candidate Election Returns". Elections Manitoba. Elections Manitoba.

2016 provincial election redistributed results
Party	%
Progressive Conservative	66.7
New Democratic	15.2
Liberal	14.8
Manitoba	2.2
Green	1.1

== See also ==
- List of Manitoba provincial electoral districts
- Canadian provincial electoral districts
