= Cooks Creek, Manitoba =

Community in Manitoba, Canada

Cooks Creek
- Unincorporated community
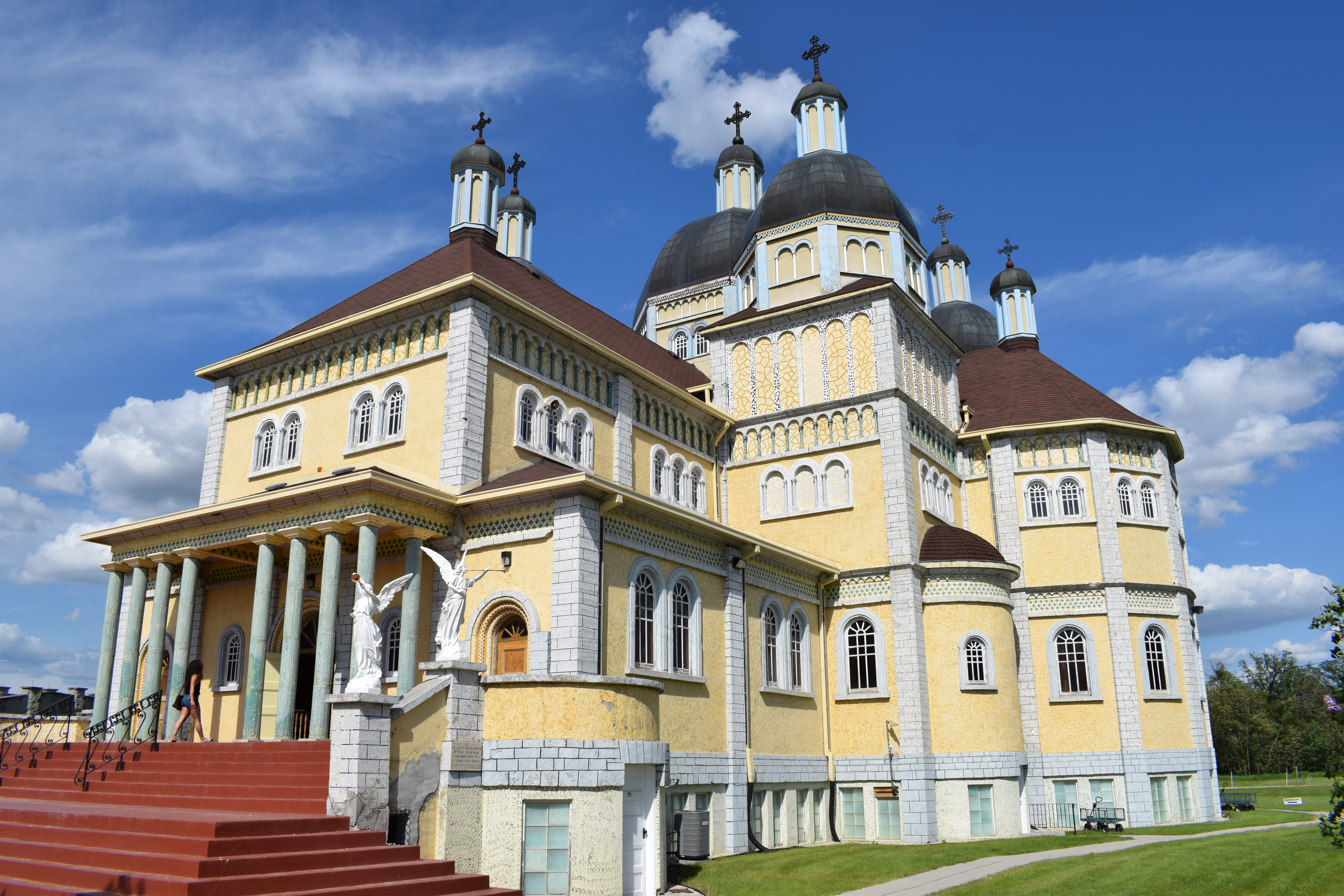
- Church of the Immaculate Conception

- Location within Manitoba
- Coordinates: 50.018°N 96.773°W
- Country: Canada
- Province: Manitoba
- Rural Municipality: Springfield

Cooks Creek is an unincorporated community in the Rural Municipality of Springfield, Manitoba, Canada. The community is home to two churches, a community centre and a museum.

The Immaculate Conception Ukrainian Greek Catholic Church is an intricately designed wooden church featuring nine cupolas and built almost entirely with volunteer labour under the direction of the amateur architect and priest Father Phillip Ruh. Construction was started in 1930 and completed in 1952. The structure was designated a National Historic Site of Canada in 1996. The church grounds play host to a biennial two day medieval festival on the last weekend of July.

The St. Michael's Roman Catholic Church, which is often referred to as the "Polish Church", is located one mile North of town and shares property with the Cooks Creek Heritage Museum (CCHM). The parish was established in 1899 while construction of the church in its present form finished in 1922. The CCHM was founded in 1968 by parish priest Father Alois Krivanek and housed in the former rectory building built in 1937. The Church/Museum grounds now contain several pioneer buildings and is the site of an annual "Heritage Day" celebration on the last weekend in August.

== History ==
European settlement in the area began in the mid-1860s with four families residing there by 1867. The hamlet was named Cooks Creeks after Captain Joseph Cook; whose name was adopted in recognition for his service to the community. A post office was established in 1873 on 13-12-5E and later moved. Beginning in 1897, the community saw a large influx of Polish and Ukrainian migration as a result of the immigration and settlement programs of Minister of the Interior Clifford Sifton.

== See also ==
- List of communities in Manitoba

== External Reading ==
- Geographic Names of Manitoba (pg. 53) - the Millennium Bureau of Canada
- Ukrainian Catholic Church of the Immaculate Conception - Cooks Creek, Manitoba
- St. Michael's RC Church
- Cooks Creek Heritage Museum
- Springfield 1st Rural Municipality in Manitoba 1873-1973. Duglad Women's Institute. 1974.
