= Anola =

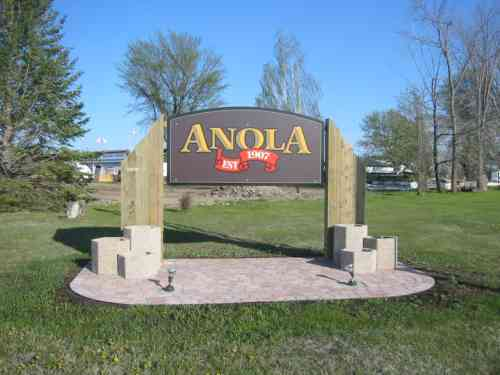
- Motto: "Share in our Future... Invest in your Community..."
- Location of Anola in Manitoba
- Coordinates: 49°53′06″N 96°38′08″W
- Country: Canada
- Province: Manitoba
- Region: Eastman
- Rural Municipality: Springfield
- Established: 1907

Government
  - Mayor: Patrick Therrien
  - Councillor: Valerie Ralke
  - MP Provencher: Ted Falk
- Elevation: 255 m (838 ft)

Population (2016)
  - Total: 3,829
- RM of Springfield Ward 4
- Time zone: UTC-6 (Central (CST))
  - Summer (DST): UTC-5 (Central (CDT))
- Postal code: R0E0A0
- FSA: R5L
- Area codes: 204, 431, 584
- Website: anola.mb.ca

Anola is an unincorporated community in the Canadian province of Manitoba. It is located 24 kilometres (15 miles) east of Winnipeg and 40 kilometres (25 miles) north of Steinbach in the Rural Municipality of Springfield. The community has a population of approximately 200 people.

== History ==
The Anola area is part of the traditional territory of Anishnaabe and Swampy Cree First Nations. In 1870, the area became part of the new province of Manitoba. In 1871, the area was covered under Treaty 1 between the British Crown and the First Nations. The treaty facilitated the settlement of southern Manitoba including agricultural settlements in the Anola area.

In 1907, when the Grand Trunk Pacific Railway expressed an interest in the district, the land was sold, and the village of Free Port was born. The name changed in 1912 to Anola.

=== Etymology ===
According to the Department of the Interior, the name Anola is an "invented name," and the place was formerly known as Richland Post Office. A 1905 letter from M. Holloway, who ran the Richland Post Office which served the area, may have prompted this conclusion. In his correspondence to the Geographic Board of Canada, it was indicated that residents were unaware of why it was so named except "as a more convenient means of referring to it than Township 10-7E."

Ted Stone states in his book The Story behind Manitoba Names:

Locals sometimes ascribe the name to the rise in elevation there. The area is on a slight but perceptible, ridge. According to this theory it's on "a knoll," which gave rise to the name Anola. Others have suggested that Anola is named after the wife of a railway official. This theory has some credence since Anola comes at the end of a series of rail points (Elma, Hazel, Vivian) using women's first names. It's likely that the same official named at least two of these towns after one or more daughters. Since all four towns received their names at about the same time, Elma, Hazel, Vivian and Anola may have been sisters. Or perhaps the local legend is correct and Anola was the mother of the other three.

== Amenities ==
Anola has a K-8 school. Anola school offers a wide array of programming including French, band, music, choir, grade 6-8 life options, resource, counselling, inter/intra-school athletics, and school-wide talent development program.

Anola is home to The 10 Acre Woods, a petting farm and animal rescue centre.

In mid 2019, Canada Post began the process of "Urbanizing" the Anola and surrounding area's postal system, thus transitioning Anola addresses from the rural Postal Code R0E 0A0 to the new Forward Sortation Area of R5L.

== Notable people ==
- Corey Koskie, former Major League Baseball player for the Minnesota Twins.
- Al Simmons, children's performer/musician
