= Hazelridge =

- Unincorporated community
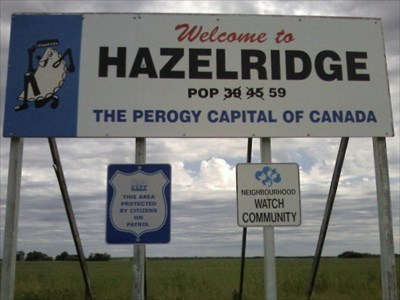
- The sign claiming Hazelridge as the perogy capital of Canada

- Location within Manitoba
- Coordinates: 49.965°N 96.717°W
- Area codes: 204, 431

Hazelridge is a community in the Rural Municipality of Springfield, Manitoba.

Services available in Hazelridge include an elementary school and a sports complex. Hazelridge is located adjacent to the Heartland Hutterite Colony. Hazelridge is the self-proclaimed "Perogy capital of Canada" as stated on a large sign at the entrance to the community.

== History ==
It is first noted as a Post Office in 1904 and located on NW 25-11-6E.. It moved to 33-11-6E near the CPR station which was built in 1907. The Post Office took the name of Klondyke in 1909 and closed in 1915. At some point the present name took common usage although there was a Hazelridge and a Klondike school district mentioned in records.
