= Ron Schuler =

Canadian politician

Ron Schuler MLA
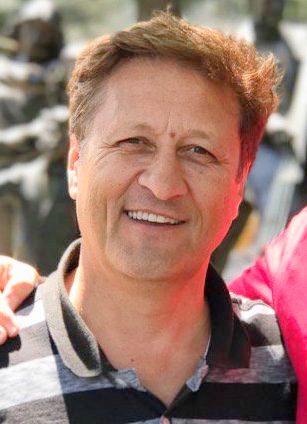
- Schuler in 2017

Minister of Infrastructure
- In office August 17, 2017 – December 30, 2021
- Premier: Brian Pallister; Kelvin Goertzen; Heather Stefanson
- Preceded by: Blaine Pedersen
- Succeeded by: Reg Helwer

Minister of Crown Services
- In office May 3, 2016 – August 17, 2017
- Premier: Brian Pallister
- Preceded by: Greg Dewar
- Succeeded by: Cliff Cullen

Member of the Legislative Assembly of Manitoba for Springfield-Ritchot Springfield (1999–2011) St. Paul (2011–2019)
- Incumbent
- Assumed office September 21, 1999
- Preceded by: Glen Findlay

Personal details
- Born: February 12, 1963 (age 63) Winnipeg, Manitoba, Canada
- Party: Progressive Conservative
- Education: University of Manitoba (BA)

Ronald Reinhold Schuler is a Canadian politician. He is currently a member of the Manitoba Legislature and a representative of the Progressive Conservative Party (PCs). He was first elected in the 1999 provincial election. and was re-elected in the 2003, 2007, 2011, 2016, 2019 and 2023 elections.

After the PCs won control of the Manitoba government in the 2016 election, Premier of Manitoba Brian Pallister appointed Schuler Minister of Crown Services. On August 17, 2017 he was named Minister of Infrastructure. On December 30, 2021, Premier Heather Stefanson removed Schuler from cabinet for persistently refusing to reveal whether he was vaccinated against COVID-19. On December 17, 2025, Schuler announced he would not seek reelection for an eighth term, but would serve as an MLA until the next election is called.

== Personal life and education ==
Schuler was born in Winnipeg, Manitoba. He attended John M. King Elementary School, before moving to Benton Harbor, Michigan, where he attended Millburg Elementary School in Berrien County. In 1976, he moved back to Winnipeg, where he attended Elmwood Junior High and graduated from Elmwood High School in 1981. He is the youngest son of Wanda and Reinhold Schuler, with four sisters and one brother.

Schuler obtained a Bachelor of Arts from the University of Manitoba in 1987, with a major in international relations and a minor in sociology. He was a junior executive at the T. Eaton Company from 1979 to 1984. Schuler went on to become a small business owner, co-owning Christmas Traditions, Espresso Junction Inc., and Gingerbread World Inc. He also served as Chair of the Manitoba Intercultural Council from 1991 to 1993.

== School board service ==
On October 25, 1995, Schuler began his political career when he was elected as a school trustee for Ward Three in the River East School Division.

1995 River East School Division Ward Three school trustee results

Candidate	Total Votes	Result
Ron Schuler	5745	Elected
Brian Olynik	4525	Elected
Peter Kotyk	3957	Elected
Bill Dueck	3726
Leni Hamm-Lousier	2591

In his first term on the River East School Board, Schuler served as Chairman of the Education and Policy Committee. He advocated a zero violence tolerance policy on issues affecting the safety of students and staff. Schuler strongly supported increased technology funding and division-wide upgrades to classroom computers and also strongly supported heritage language programs offered in the divisions.

He was re-elected on October 28 as a school trustee for the River East School Division, Ward Three in the 1998 election. Schuler’s re-election led him to being appointed to serve as Chairman of the Board of Trustees in November 1998. He resigned from his position as school trustee on September 23, 1999 to pursue his career in provincial politics with the Progressive Conservative Party of Manitoba.

1998 River East School Division Ward Three school trustee results

Candidate	Total Votes	Result
Ron Schuler	5772	Elected
Peter Kotyk	5173	Elected
Brian Olynik	5136	Elected
Con Lynch	4416
Al Penner	4005

== Legislative service ==
Schuler was elected to the Legislative Assembly of Manitoba in the provincial election held on September 21, 1999, defeating New Democrat Leonard Kimakovich by 4969 votes to 4058 in the constituency of Springfield.

1999 Manitoba general election: Springfield
Party	Candidate	Votes	%	±%	Expenditures
Progressive Conservative	Ron Schuler	4,969	49.69	-2.46	$25,718.76
New Democratic	Leonard Kimacovich	4,058	40.58	5.50	$26,227.00
Liberal	Patricia Aitken	771	7.71	-4.28	$13,962.00
Manitoba	Roger Woloshyn	203	2.03	–	$2,703.08
Total valid votes		10,001	–	–	
Rejected		44	–		
Eligible voters / turnout		13,026	77.12	-0.29	
Source(s) Source: Manitoba. Chief Electoral Officer (1999). Statement of Votes for the 37th Provincial General Election, September 21, 1999 (PDF) (Report). Winnipeg: Elections Manitoba.

During Schuler’s first term as a Member of the Legislative Assembly (MLA), Gary Filmon, Leader of the Progressive Conservative Party of Manitoba, appointed Schuler as the PC Caucus Labour & Immigration Critic.

The voters of Springfield re-elected Schuler as their MLA on June 3, 2003 by a much greater margin, though the PCs incurred a net loss of four seats across Manitoba. Stuart Murray appointed Schuler as the PC Caucus Critic for Energy, Science and Technology, and the Chief Critic for the Kyoto Accord, the Civil Service Commission, and Lotteries and Gaming.

2003 Manitoba provincial election: Springfield

Candidate Name	Party	Votes
Ron Schuler	PC	4,917 – 60.3%
Georgine Spooner	NDP	2,512 – 30.8%
Vince Boileau	Lib	682 – 8.9%
rejected		20
declined		14
total votes cast		8,145
registered voters		14,599
turnout		55.79%

On February 24, 2006, Schuler announced that he would seek the leadership of the Progressive Conservative Party of Manitoba. Hugh McFadyen won the leadership election on April 29, 2006.

2006 Progressive Conservative Party of Manitoba leadership election

Candidate Votes	Votes	Vote %
Hugh McFadyen	6,091	67%
Ron Schuler	1,953	21%
Ken Waddell	1099	12%

For a third consecutive term, Schuler was re-elected as a Member of the Legislative Assembly for Springfield on May 22, 2007.

2007 Manitoba general election: Springfield
Party	Candidate	Votes	%	±%	Expenditures
Progressive Conservative	Ron Schuler	5,165	58.46	-2.16	$25,538.14
New Democratic	Ernest Muswagon	2,656	30.06	-0.91	$7,505.06
Liberal	James Johnston	1,014	11.48	3.07	$4,606.05
Total valid votes		8,835	–	–	
Rejected		46	–		
Eligible voters / turnout		15,641	56.78	0.99	
Source(s) Source: Manitoba. Chief Electoral Officer (2007). Statement of Votes for the 39th Provincial General Election, May 22, 2007 (PDF) (Report). Winnipeg: Elections Manitoba.

In September 2007, Schuler was appointed Critic for Education, Citizenship and Youth, as well as Caucus Whip by Leader Hugh McFadyen. As of February 4, 2010, Schuler is the Critic for Housing and Community Development and Sports.

Schuler held several critic portfolios during his time in Opposition, including Labour and Immigration, Energy, Science and Technology, Kyoto Accord, the Civil Service Commission, Lotteries and Gaming, Education, Citizenship & Youth, Community Economic Development Fund, Housing and Community Development and Sports, as well as Caucus Whip.

Schuler was re-nominated to represent the Progressive Conservative Party in the 2011 Manitoba provincial election, held on October 4, in the newly created constituency of St. Paul and won re-election.

2011 Manitoba general election: St. Paul
Party	Candidate	Votes	%	Expenditures
Progressive Conservative	Ron Schuler	5,554	59.59	$31,993.34
New Democratic	Cynthia Ryan	3,491	37.45	$18,456.72
Liberal	Ludolf R. Grolle	276	2.96	$462.91
Total valid votes		9,321	–	
Rejected		48	–	
Eligible voters / turnout		16,075	58.28	
Source(s) Source: Manitoba. Chief Electoral Officer (2011). Statement of Votes for the 40th Provincial General Election, October 4, 2011 (PDF) (Report). Winnipeg: Elections Manitoba. "Election Returns: 40th General Election". Elections Manitoba. 2011.

2016 Manitoba general election: St. Paul
Party	Candidate	Votes	%	±%	Expenditures
Progressive Conservative	Ron Schuler	7,091	71.60	12.02	$26,021.09
New Democratic	Andrew Podolecki	1,757	17.74	-19.71	$5,710.34
Liberal	Pete Sanderson	1,055	10.65	7.69	$8,519.18
Total valid votes		9,903	–	–	
Rejected		203	–		
Eligible voters / turnout		16,536	61.12	2.83	
Source(s) Source: Manitoba. Chief Electoral Officer (2016). Statement of Votes for the 41st Provincial General Election, April 19, 2016 (PDF) (Report). Winnipeg: Elections Manitoba. "Election Returns: 41st General Election". Elections Manitoba. 2016.

2019 Manitoba general election: Springfield-Ritchot
Party	Candidate	Votes	%	±%	Expenditures
Progressive Conservative	Ron Schuler	5,670	59.48	-7.2	$44,481.26
New Democratic	Sam Okoi	1,982	20.79	+5.6	$1,451.32
Green	Garrett Hawgood	1,066	11.18	+10.1	$672.14
Liberal	Sara Mirwaldt	814	8.54	-6.3	$0.00
Total valid votes		9,532	99.47		
Rejected		50	0.53		
Eligible voters / turnout		15,822	60.56		
Progressive Conservative hold		Swing		-6.4	
Source(s) Source: Manitoba. Chief Electoral Officer (2019). Statement of Votes for the 42nd Provincial General Election, September 10, 2019 (PDF) (Report). Winnipeg: Elections Manitoba. "Candidate Election Returns". Elections Manitoba. Elections Manitoba.

2023 Manitoba general election: Springfield-Ritchot
Party	Candidate	Votes	%	±%	Expenditures
Progressive Conservative	Ron Schuler	5,752	54.89	-4.59	$32,727.68
New Democratic	Tammy Ivanco	3,827	36.52	+15.73	$5,175.20
Liberal	Trevor Kirczenow	900	8.59	+0.05	$285.00
Total valid votes/expense limit		10,479	99.37	–	$70,572.00
Total rejected and declined ballots		66	0.63	–	
Turnout		10,545	58.30	-2.27	
Eligible voters		18,089			
Progressive Conservative hold		Swing		-10.16	
Source(s) Source: Elections Manitoba
