= October 1910 =

Month of 1910

<<	October 1910					>>
Su	Mo	Tu	We	Th	Fr	Sa
						1
2	3	4	5	6	7	8
9	10	11	12	13	14	15
16	17	18	19	20	21	22
23	24	25	26	27	28	29
30	31

The following events occurred in October 1910:

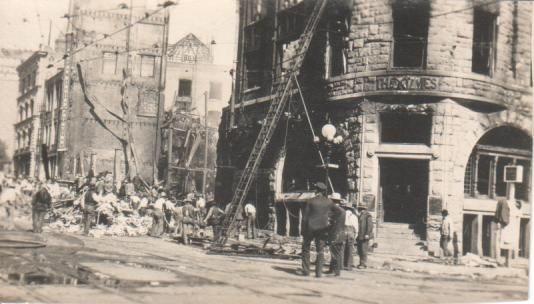
October 1, 1910: Terrorist bombing of the Los Angeles Times kills 21 people

== October 1, 1910 (Saturday) ==
- Twenty-one employees of the Los Angeles Times were killed by the detonation of a time bomb at 1:07 a.m. local time outside of the Times offices. The 16 sticks of dynamite triggered the explosion of underground gas lines and a subsequent fire.
- Twenty-three American sailors, from the battleship USS New Hampshire, drowned when their launch capsized.
- Federico Boyd became acting president of Panama.
- A coal mine explosion at Palaú, in the Mexican state of Coahuila, killed 200 workers.
- The first mid-air collision between two airplanes occurred in Milan, when an Antoinette monoplane, piloted by René Thomas of France, rammed a Farman biplane being flown by Bertram Dickson. Both pilots were injured in the crash.
- Born: Bonnie Parker, American outlaw and partner of Clyde Barrow as part of "Bonnie and Clyde"; in Rowena, Texas (killed in police shootout, 1934).

== October 2, 1910 (Sunday) ==
- The asteroid Interamnia, seventh largest in the Solar System (300 kilometers in diameter) was discovered by Italian astronomer Vincenzo Cerulli from an observatory in Teramo.

== October 3, 1910 (Monday) ==
- The Tsucheng-yuan, also known as the Imperial Senate of China, was convened for the first time, with an opening presided over by the regent, Prince Chun. The national assembly had 202 members, of whom 100 were elected by provincial assemblies, and the others were appointed by the regent.
- Died:
  - Lucy Hobbs Taylor, 77, first American woman dentist to have received a D.D.S.
  - "Johann F.", 59, a patient of Dr. Alois Alzheimer at LMU Munich. The case of dementia in Johann F. was described by Dr. Alzheimer in 1911, and the name given to the illness was popularized. Another source describes Auguste Deter, who died in 1906, as the original patient of Dr. Alzheimer.
  - Dr. Miguel Bombarda, 59, Portuguese psychiatrist, politician and anti-monarchist, was shot and killed by one of his patients two days before his co-conspirators launched the revolution that ended Portugal's monarchy.

== October 4, 1910 (Tuesday) ==
- King Manuel II of Portugal and the Queen Mother were forced to flee Lisbon, after the Army and Navy joined in a coup by the Republican movement and began shelling the royal palace.
- Thirty-seven people were killed and 30 injured near Staunton, Illinois, in a collision between two interurban trolleys.

== October 5, 1910 (Wednesday) ==
- Teófilo Braga was named as the first President of Portugal by revolutionists who abolished the monarchy.
- Russia's Prime Minister, Pyotr Stolypin, flew as a passenger in an airplane at St. Petersburg. Six days later, former American President Theodore Roosevelt would fly as an airplane passenger in St. Louis.
- Francisco I. Madero, who had challenged Porfirio Díaz in the Mexican presidential election earlier in the year, fled to San Antonio, Texas, where he then issued the Plan de San Luis Potosí, calling for revolution against the Diaz government. Charles H. Harris and Louis R. Sadler,

== October 6, 1910 (Thursday) ==
- Former King Manuel II and other members of Portugal's House of Braganza arrived safely at Gibraltar on board the royal yacht Amelia.
- Eleftherios Venizelos was elected Prime Minister of Greece for the first of his seven non-consecutive terms.
- Baseball outfielder Bill Collins of the Boston Doves became the first major league player to hit for a "natural cycle" (a single, a double, a triple and a home run in sequential order). Only 13 other players have accomplished the feat, the most recent being Gary Matthews, Jr., in 2006.

== October 7, 1910 (Friday) ==
- Hundreds of people were killed after forest fires broke out in northern Lake of the Woods County, Minnesota, destroying the towns of Baudette, Spooner, Graceton, and Pitt Trains sent by the Canadian Pacific Railway evacuated many of the townspeople to Ontario, where the fires caused additional damage. By October 11, more than 200 bodies had been recovered, the death toll was estimated at 400, and other towns (Roosevelt, Longworth, Swift, Ziplie, Solar, Cedar Spur, Gravel Pit Spur, and Engle) were reported destroyed.
- Born: Ngo Dinh Nhu, South Vietnamese political boss and brother of President Ngo Dinh Diem; both were assassinated in a coup in 1963.

== October 8, 1910 (Saturday) ==
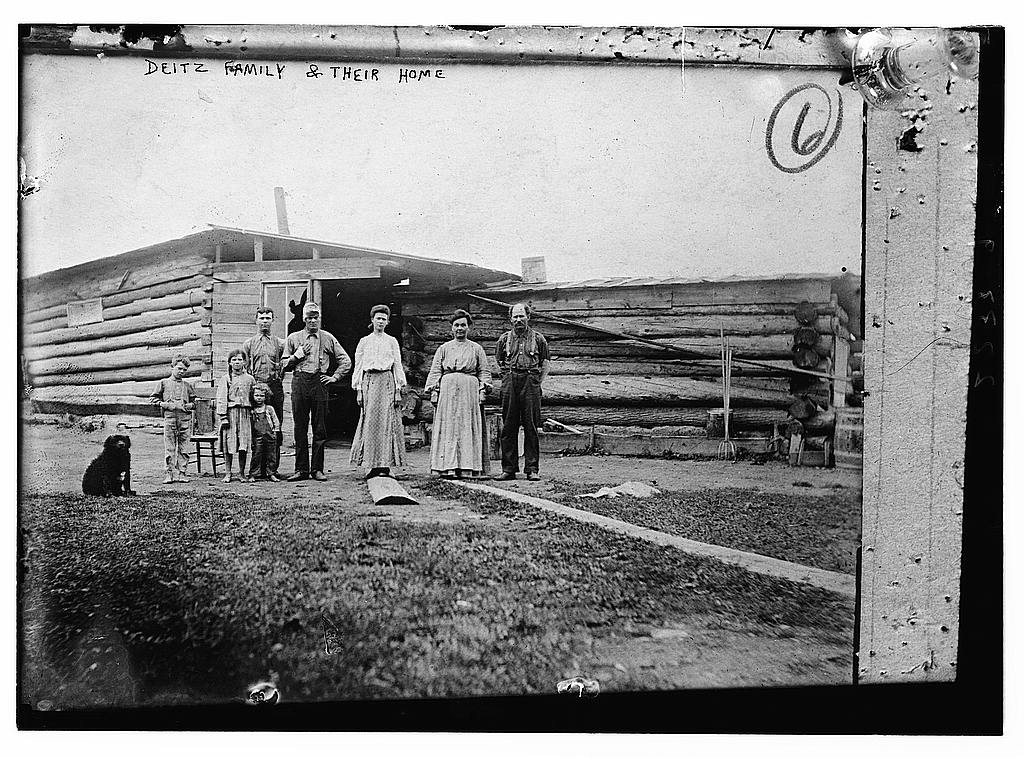
The Dietz Family of Wisconsin

- The "Battle of Cameron Dam" came to an end, with frontiersman John F. Deitz (sometimes spelled "Dietz") surrendering to a force of 60 sheriff's deputies in Sawyer County, Wisconsin, after a one-week standoff. For six years, Deitz had maintained a log dam on the Thornapple River and claimed it as his own. By the time the standoff ended, Deitz was popularly known as either a dangerous outlaw or a national hero.
- Portugal began the next phase of its republican revolution, with a decree expelling members of the clergy, particularly those of the Jesuit order.
- Born: Gus Hall, American Communist leader; general secretary of CPUSA, 1959–2000, presidential candidate 1972,1976,1980 and 1984; as Arvo Halberg, in Cherry Township, Minnesota. (d.2000)
- Died: Maria Konopnicka, 58, Austro-Hungarian poet and writer

== October 9, 1910 (Sunday) ==
- A coal mine explosion at Starkville, Colorado, killed fifty-two miners.
- Edgar Cayce first attained national fame when he became the cover subject of the New York Times Magazine
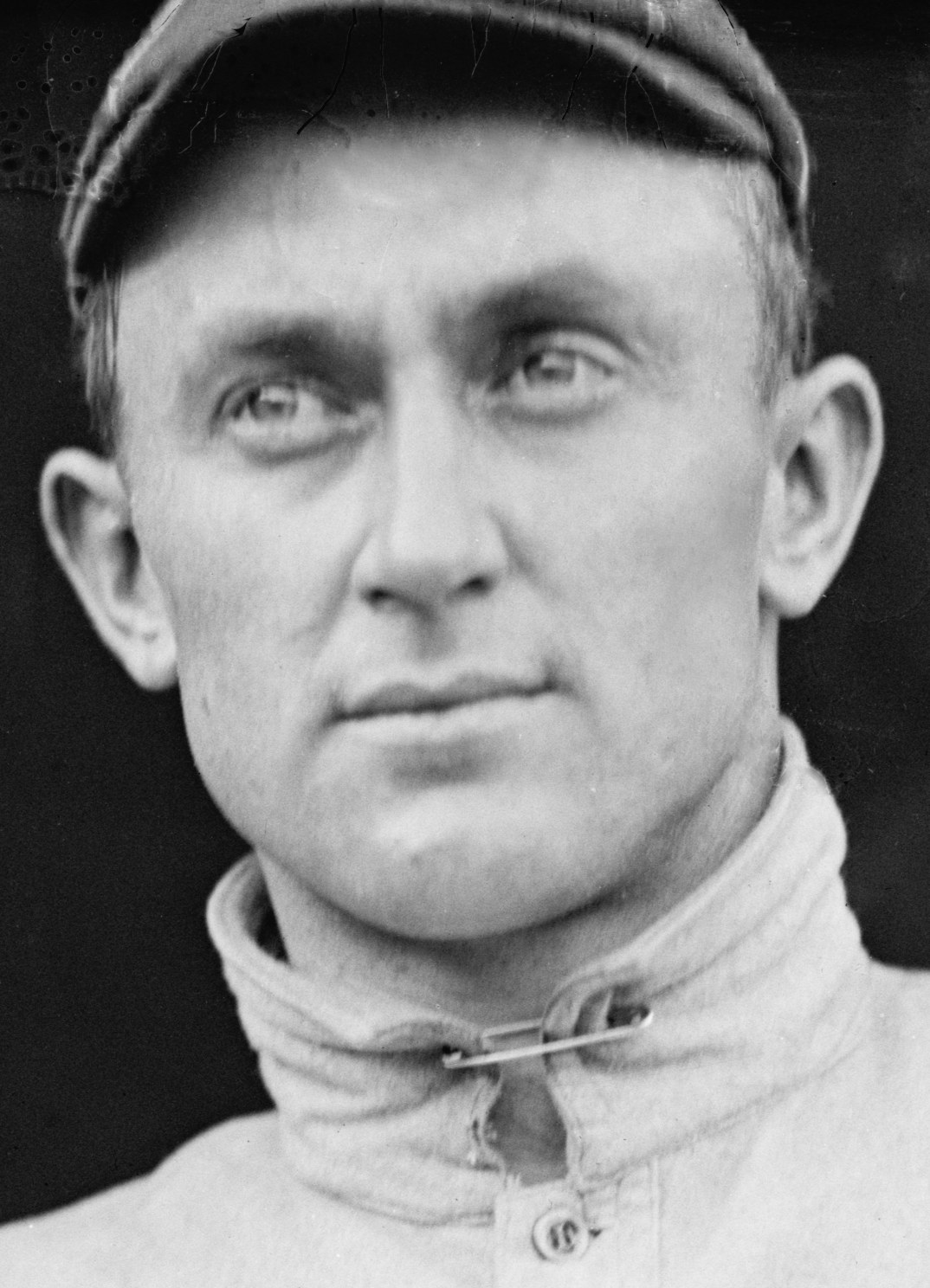
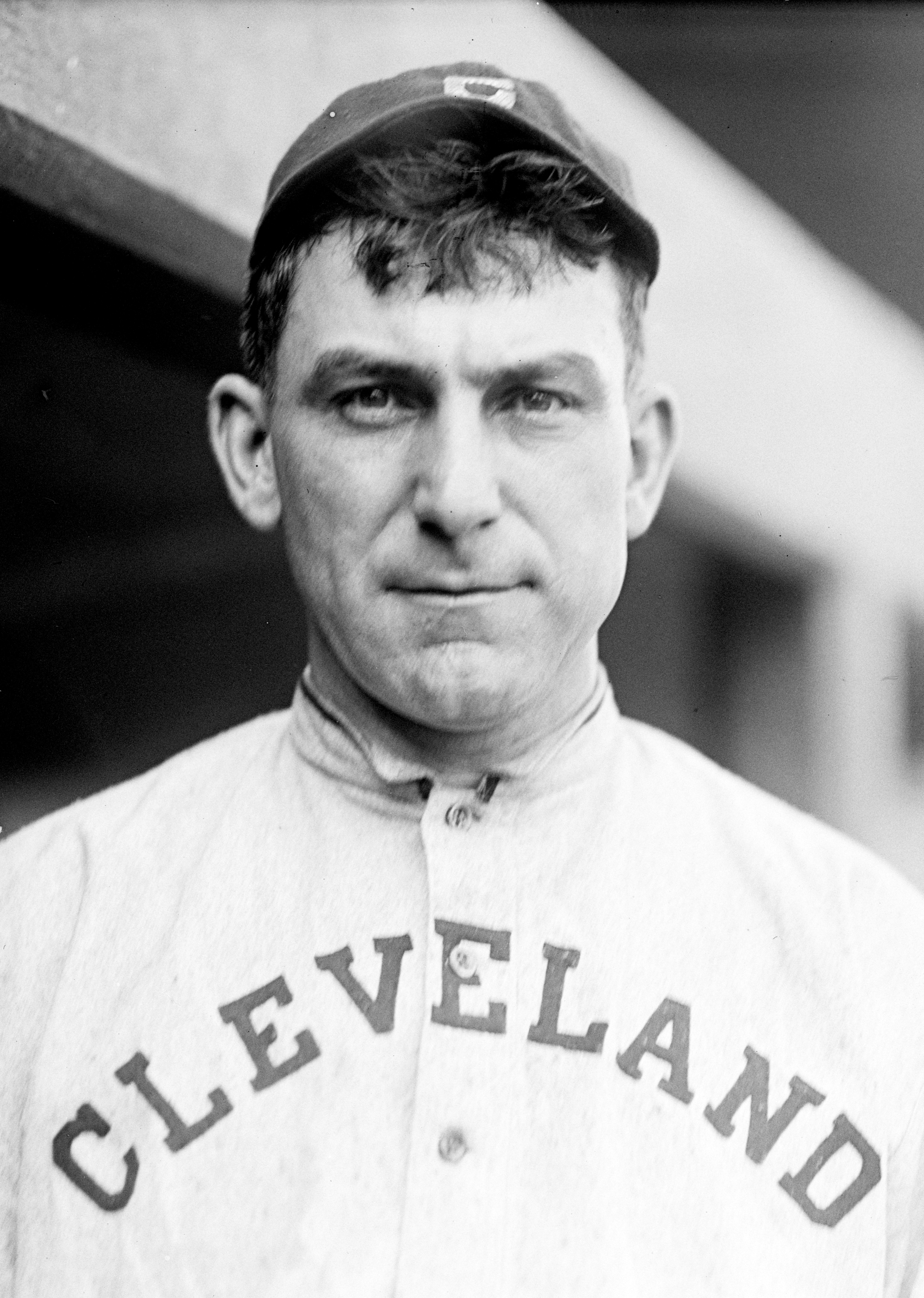
Batting averages: Ty Cobb (.384944) against Nap Lajoie (.384084)
- Ty Cobb of the Detroit Tigers won the Chalmers Award for best batting in baseball's American League, with a batting average of .384944 (based on 196 hits on 509 at bats, rounded to .385), narrowly edging the mark of .384084 for Nap Lajoie of the Cleveland Naps (227 out of 591). Cobb was allowed to sit out the last two games of the season, while Lajoie got eight hits in the final game. Sixty-eight years later, baseball historian Pete Palmer discovered a miscalculation in statistics and found that Cobb had actually finished with a .383 average. Major League Baseball declined, in 1981, to revise the 1910 records.

== October 10, 1910 (Monday) ==
- Charles Evans Hughes was sworn in as the 62nd person to serve as a justice of the Supreme Court of the United States.
- Rebels in Manaus, Brazil, seized control of the government of the State of Amazonas, until driven out by federal troops.
- The city of Vinton, Louisiana, was incorporated.
- The Kaiserbrücke suspension bridge in Breslau, designed by Richard Plüddemann, was dedicated.
- Born: Julius Shulman, American architectural photographer (d. 2009)

== October 11, 1910 (Tuesday) ==
- Theodore Roosevelt flew as a passenger in an airplane, piloted by Arch Hoxsey, at Kinloch aviation field near St. Louis. The former president of the United States remained aloft for more than three minutes. Less than two months later, on December 31, the same plane would crash, killing Hoxsey. Russia's prime minister Stolypin had been the first world leader to fly in an airplane, going up six days earlier. The first incumbent U.S. President to fly would be Franklin D. Roosevelt.
- Sun Yat-sen convened a meeting of the Chinese revolutionary group, Tongmenghui, in the city of Georgetown capital of the British colony of Penang in the Straits Settlements, where the group set a date of March 29, 1911, to begin an uprising against the Imperial government.
- Veteran City, Florida (later renamed as Gulfport) was incorporated.

== October 12, 1910 (Wednesday) ==
- Roque Sáenz Peña was inaugurated as President of Argentina, and Victorino de la Plaza (who would become President in 1914) became Vice-President.
- In New York, the Rockefeller Institute for Medical Research, funded by John D. Rockefeller, opened its first hospital, with 75 beds.

== October 13, 1910 (Thursday) ==
- The Interstate Commerce Commission issued the first regulations requiring ladders, sill steps and hand brakes on all railroad cars in the United States.
- In fiction (Stephen King's short story "1408"), October 13, 1910, was the date that Kevin O'Malley leaped to his death from Room 1408 of the New York's Hotel Dolphin, becoming the first of 42 fatalities associated with the haunted room.
- Born: H. W. L. Poonja, Hindu spiritual leader;, in Gujranwala, Punjab Province, British India (d. 1997)

== October 14, 1910 (Friday) ==
- English aviator Claude Grahame-White landed his airplane on the street between the White House and the Old Executive Office Building, which housed the U.S. Departments of State, War and the Navy. Grahame-White had been invited as the guest of the Army Signal Corps. After being greeted by top-ranking officials, he took off again.
- The French steamer Ville de Rochefort sank with 23 of its 25 crew after being rammed by the British steamer Peveril, off of the coast of Île de Noirmoutier. The ship went down within three minutes, and only two of its crew were rescued.
- A hurricane in the Caribbean Sea near Cuba sank numerous vessels, at least two of which were known to have been in the area and which never reached their destinations. The cargo feighter Arkadia had departed from New Orleans on October 11 with 33 crew and four passengers, bound for San Juan, Puerto Rico, and the British cargo ship Silverdale had left New York City on October 7 toward Havana.
- Born: John Wooden, American college basketball coach who guided UCLA to ten NCAA championships; in Hall, Indiana (d. 2010)
- Died: Sydney Ringer, 75, British physician who invented Ringer's solution of sodium chloride, potassium and calcium.

== October 15, 1910 (Saturday) ==
- At 8:00 am, Walter Wellman and five crewmates took off from Atlantic City, New Jersey, in the dirigible America on an attempt to become the first people to fly across the Atlantic Ocean. The flight ended after 450 miles (720 km) and three days, and the six men were rescued by the ship Trent.
- A homecoming weekend was first held at the University of Illinois, as alumni were invited to watch the Illini's 3–0 win over the University of Chicago. Some sources claim that the idea originated at Illinois, while others cite the origin as a November 24, 1909 game at Baylor University. The first "Homecoming Weekend" by that name took place at the University of Missouri in 1911.
- After 35 years, France lifted a ban against the importation of American potatoes. In 1875, the ban had been imposed because of a blight believed to be carried by the American product, and a generation of Frenchmen had grown up without the "pomme de terre".
- Japan launched its largest battleship to that time, the 20,800-ton Kawachi, from the Kure naval yard.
- At a convention of Episcopalians in Cincinnati, a proposal to change the name of the body from the "Protestant Episcopal Church" to the "Holy Catholic Episcopal Church" failed by one vote. The motion was passed 42–25 by the clergy, but declined 31–32 by the laymen.
- Ramon Barros Luco was elected President of Chile.
- French aviator Louis Baillod crashed his monoplane into a crowd, decapitating a girl and injuring several at Limoges, France.
- Died:
  - Jonathan P. Dolliver, 52, U.S. Senator from Iowa since 1900, died of heart failure from pneumonia
  - Stanley Ketchel, 24, American boxer, world middleweight champion since 1908, was murdered at his ranch in Conway, Missouri.

== October 16, 1910 (Sunday) ==
- Great Britain set a three-month deadline for Persia to stop the raiding of commercial vehicles on the roads connecting Bushihr, Shiraz, and Isfahan, after which it would send an occupation force of 1,200 men to troops. The ultimatum was protested worldwide, but the Majlis eventually voted to set up a force to protect the roads.

== October 17, 1910 (Monday) ==
- The railroad strike in France was called off, unconditionally, by the union's strike committee, only six days after it began. A total of 80,000 employees had walked off of their jobs.
- Seven passengers were flown from Paris to London on board the dirigible Clement-Bayard, making the 260-mile (420 km) journey in less than six hours.
- Born: Marina Núñez del Prado, Bolivian sculptor (d. 1995)
- Died:
  - Julia Ward Howe, 91, author of The Battle Hymn of the Republic
  - William Vaughn Moody, 41, American playwright
  - Sergey Muromtsev, 60, first President of the Russian Duma
  - Carlo Michelstaedter, Italian poet and philosopher, author of major works like "La persuasione e la rettorica" and "Il dialogo della salute".

== October 18, 1910 (Tuesday) ==
- The inhabitants of Ponape, one of the Caroline Islands under the colonial administration of Germany, revolted after a German overseer had struck a roadworker with a whip, then killed Governor Gustav Boeder and other colonial officials. A month later, the Germans put down the rebellion and then deported the remaining 250 inhabitants to the island of Angaur, and repopulated Ponape from other islands.
- The British liner Trent rescued the crew of the dirigible America three days after its departure from Atlantic City. The America had been equipped with a wireless radio and made the first distress call ever sent from the air.
- Eleftherios Venizelos became the new Prime Minister of Greece, at the request of King George.
- The novel Howards End, by E.M. Forster, was first published.
- The towns of Ranson, West Virginia, and Marcus, Washington, were both incorporated.
- Died: Willard S. Whitmore, 68, American inventor of electrotyping matrix process

== October 19, 1910 (Wednesday) ==
- A hurricane swept across Cuba and the United States. Although it caused no fatalities on land, the storm sank the steamer Crown Prince, with 35 on board.
- Born: Subrahmanyan Chandrasekhar, American astrophysicist, Nobel laureate, in Lahore, British India (now Pakistan) (d. 1995)
- Died: Luigi Lucheni, 47, Italian assassin who had killed the Austro-Hungarian Empress Elisabeth of Bavaria in 1898, committed suicide in prison

== October 20, 1910 (Thursday) ==
- RMS Olympic, the largest ocean liner up to that time, was launched at Belfast. It would be put into service by the White Star Line in 1911, and carry passengers until 1935.
- Died:
  - David B. Hill, 67, former U.S. Senator and Governor of New York
  - General Thomas T. Eckert, 85, Chairman of the Western Union Telegraph Company.

== October 21, 1910 (Friday) ==
- HMS Niobe, the first ship of the Royal Canadian Navy, arrived at Halifax harbour.
- Alice Guy, the first female film producer, released The Solax Kid, the first of more than 300 productions to her credit.
- In the third meeting since 1900 of the electors of the original Hall of Fame for Great Americans, ten people were enshrined, bringing the total to 51. Harriet Beecher Stowe, Oliver Wendell Holmes, Edgar Allan Poe, James Fenimore Cooper, Phillips Brooks, William Cullen Bryant, Frances E. Willard, Andrew Jackson, George Bancroft and John Lothrop Motley each received the required 51 votes.

== October 22, 1910 (Saturday) ==
- China's Imperial Senate unanimously passed a resolution requesting that the Emperor's regent, move up the date for an elected parliament and a written constitution, at that time scheduled for 1916. A new date of 1913 would be set as a result.
- The predecessor to the French Air Force, the Aéronautique Militaire, was established as a branch of the Army of France.
- Russia passed a law barring German immigration into its three western frontier provinces that bordered Germany. The areas on both sides of the border are now part of Poland.
- Died: Annis Ford Eastman, 58, first woman ordained to preach in the Congregational Church of the United States.

== October 23, 1910 (Sunday) ==
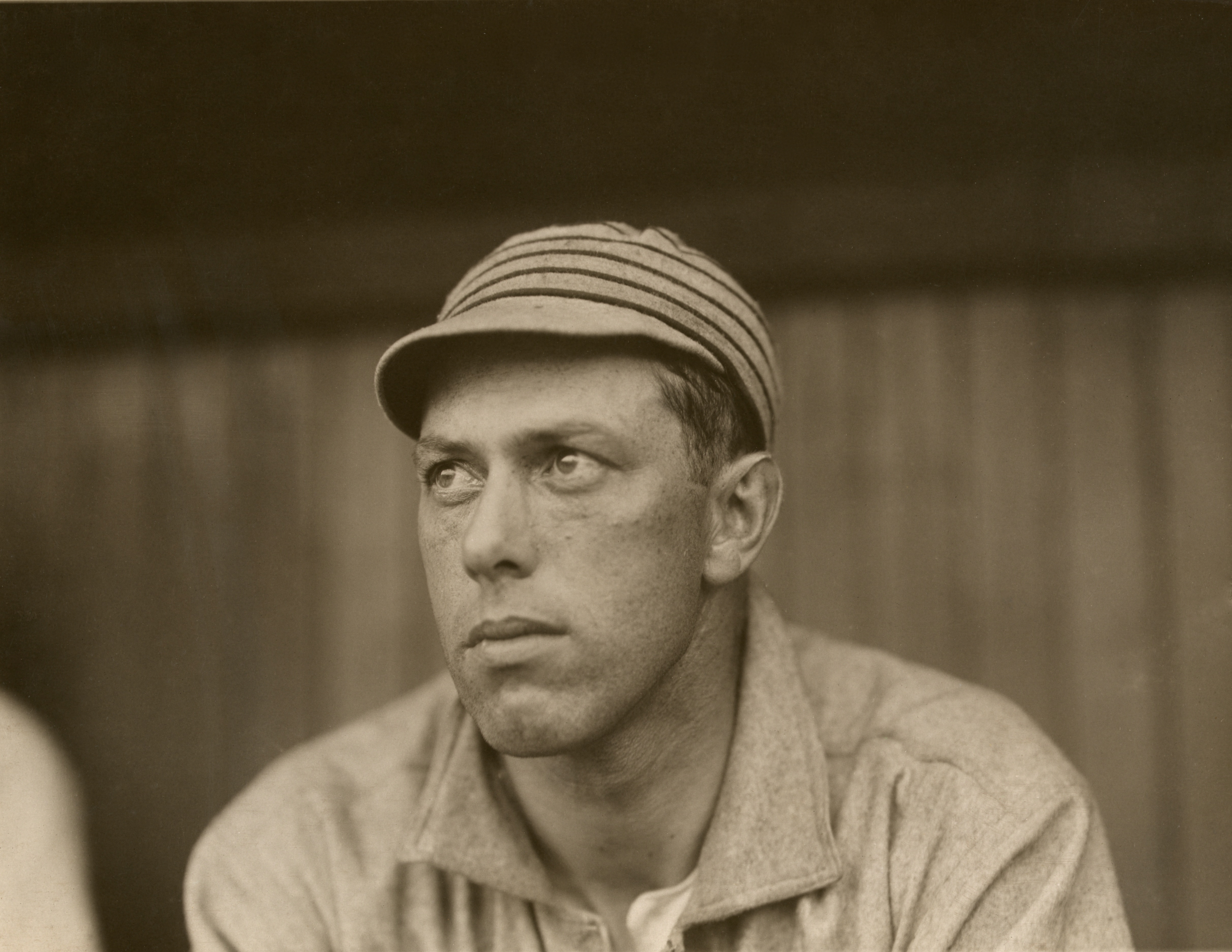
Jack Coombs, World Series hero

- The Philadelphia Athletics defeated the Chicago Cubs, 7–2, to win the 1910 World Series in Game 5. Jack Coombs had been the winning pitcher in three of the Athletics' four wins.
- By a margin of 262,066 to 238,928, voters in Switzerland rejected a proposal to have proportional representation in the national parliament.
- Born:
  - Richard Mortensen, Danish painter (d. 1993)
  - Hayden Rorke (stage name for William Henry Rorke) American TV and film actor known for portraying "Dr. Bellows" on the situation comedy I Dream of Jeannie; in Brooklyn, New York City (d. 1987)
- Died: Chulalongkorn, 57, King of Siam since 1868. Under the royal name of King Rama V, Chulalongkorn abolished slavery in the Southeast Asian kingdom later known as Thailand. He was succeeded by his son, Vajiravudh, who became Rama VI. October 23 continues to be observed in Thailand as a national holiday (Piyamaharaj Day or Chulalongkorn Day).

== October 24, 1910 (Monday) ==
- A hurricane, volcanic eruption and storm surge struck the Casamicciola on the Italian island of Ischia, near Naples, and Cetara on Amalfi Coast, killing 189 people.
- U.S. Interior Secretary Richard A. Ballinger ordered the sale of 1,650,000 acres (6,700 km^{2}) of Indian lands in Oklahoma.
- An explosion off of the coast of Port de Paix, Haiti, destroyed the gunboat Liberte, killing 70 of the 90 persons on board, including ten Haitian generals.
- Died: The Marquis de Massa, 79, secretary to Napoleon III.

== October 25, 1910 (Tuesday) ==
- Heavyweight boxing champion Jack Johnson tried his hand at auto racing, in a competition against champion driver Barney Oldfield, before a crowd of 5,000 at Sheepshead Bay Track. The stunt, filmed for later exhibition, was a mismatch. Johnson, driving a 90 horsepower (67 kW) Thomas Flyer, lost to veteran Oldfield, who had a 60 hp (45 kW) Knox.
- The International Court of Arbitration at The Hague awarded a judgment of $48,867 against Venezuela and to the Orinoco Steamship Company.

== October 26, 1910 (Wednesday) ==
- In Russellville, Arkansas, the first classes were held at Arkansas Tech University, known at the time as the "Second District Agriculture School".
- The Rockefeller University Hospital admitted its first research participant, opening up a new era of biomedical investigation in which physicians were given the resources and encouragement to engage in fundamental studies in the hospital laboratories on the disease problems they dealt with on the wards of the hospital.

== October 27, 1910 (Thursday) ==
- KONE Corporation, the world's fourth-largest manufacturer of elevators, was founded in Finland.
- Born: Fred de Cordova, American television director most famous for The Tonight Show, in New York City (d.2001)

== October 28, 1910 (Friday) ==
- The first public demonstration of color movies, in the United States, took place at the meeting room of the New York Electrical Society. Charles Urban and George Smith had previously demonstrated their Kinemacolor process in London, and began their presentation with a film of "a series of bowls and vases of flowers, the bouquets being revolved so as to be seen on all sides".
- Salvador Calvero was named as the new Prime Minister of Peru to succeed Germán Schreiber Waddington.

== October 29, 1910 (Saturday) ==
- Claude Grahame-White won the Gordon Bennett Cup for air racing after flying 100 kilometers (62 mi) in 61 minutes, 4.74 seconds, at a sustained speed of more than a mile a minute. French aviator Alfred Leblanc had been leading the race with a faster time over 19 of the 20 laps, before a fuel line failure caused his plane to crash.

== October 30, 1910 (Sunday) ==
- Inventor Boris Rosing received Russian patent No. 18,076 for his invention of the first cathode ray tube that could display transmitted images, technology that was adapted for television and computer monitors.
- By a margin of 329–188, France's Prime Minister Aristide Briand was given a vote of confidence by the Chamber of Deputies.
- A mob in the Persian town of Shiraz drove out most of the 6,000 members of the Jewish community there, after a false rumor had been spread that a Muslim child had been murdered as part of a ritual killing.
- Died:
  - Jean Henri Dunant, 82, founder of the International Red Cross
  - Cristóbal de Larreátegui y de la Cerda-Palafox, 73, direct descendant of Christopher Columbus styled as the 10th Duke of Veragua and 11th Admiral of the Indies.

== October 31, 1910 (Monday) ==
- The first games of the new National Billiard League were played, with New York at Boston and Kansas City at Pittsburgh. Pittsburgh beat Kansas City 50–34 and New York defeated Boston 50–41.
- King Alfonso XIII of Spain declined a request by Ecuador and Peru to arbitrate their boundary dispute.
