= Sandy Shores, Minnesota =

- Unincorporated community
- Location within Minnesota Location within the United States
- Coordinates: 48°55′51″N 94°54′55″W
- Country: United States
- State: Minnesota
- County: Lake of the Woods
- Township: Prosper
- Time zone: UTC-6 (Central (CST))
  - Summer (DST): UTC-5 (CDT)
- Area code: 218

Sandy Shores is an unincorporated community approximately 13 miles north of Williams, Lake of the Woods County, Minnesota, United States. It lies along the southern shore of Lake of the Woods, southeast of Long Point and Birch Beach.

County Road 51, also known as 60th St NW, leads to the community, which consists of a series of approximately 55 houses and cabins along Sandy Shores Drive.
