= Clementson, Minnesota =

- Unincorporated community
- Location within Minnesota Location within the United States
- Coordinates: 48°41′27″N 94°26′11″W
- Country: United States
- State: Minnesota
- County: Lake of the Woods
- Township: Gudrid
- Elevation: 1,093 ft (333 m)
- Time zone: UTC-6 (Central (CST))
  - Summer (DST): UTC-5 (CDT)
- Area code: 218
- GNIS feature ID: 641327

Clementson is an unincorporated community in Lake of the Woods County, Minnesota, United States.

The community is located east of Baudette on Minnesota State Highway 11.

== History ==
The settlement was named for Helec Clementson, a county commissioner who owned a sawmill there. A post office operated from 1901 to 1964.
