= Faunce, Minnesota =

- Unincorporated community
- Location within Minnesota Location within the United States
- Coordinates: 48°35′35″N 94°57′09″W
- Country: United States
- State: Minnesota
- County: Lake of the Woods
- Township: Forest Area
- Elevation: 1,289 ft (393 m)
- Time zone: UTC-6 (Central (CST))
  - Summer (DST): UTC-5 (CDT)
- Area code: 218
- GNIS feature ID: 654703

Faunce is an unincorporated community in Lake of the Woods County, Minnesota, United States.

A post office operated from 1917 to 1938.
