= Birch Beach =

Birch Beach may refer to the following places in the United States:

- Birch Beach, Michigan
- Birch Beach, Minnesota
