= Arnesén, Minnesota =

Arnesén
- Unincorporated community
- Location within the state of Minnesota
- Coordinates: 48°57′28″N 95°04′03″W
- Country: United States
- State: Minnesota
- County: Lake of the Woods
- Elevation: 1,066 ft (325 m)
- ZIP code: 56673
- Area code: 218
- GNIS feature ID: 654882

Arnesén is an unincorporated community located in the Township of Lakewood in Lake of the Woods County, Minnesota, United States. It is situated along the south shore of Lake of the Woods, in its Muskeg Bay. The area is sometimes also referred to as Rocky Point.

The community is along Rocky Point Road NW. It is next to the Rocky Point wildlife management area, which is 464.95 acres. The wildlife management area has historically been known for the Blue-billed ducks that would gather in the water, but those birds have seen a decrease in their numbers in recent years. The community is situated around the Lake of the Woods State Forest.

The community features the Rocky Point Resort, which is run by the Arnesen family, who claim to have inhabited the area since 1897. Fishing appears to be a significant cornerstone of the Arnesén economy, with many businesses based on the economy.

The closest incorporated town is Roosevelt, Minnesota, which is approximately 11 miles away from Arnesén.
