= Advance Motion Picture Company =

American motion-picture company

- Company logo
- Industry: Motion pictures
- Founded: February 1911
- Defunct: 1919
- Headquarters: Chicago, Illinois, United States
- Key people: George L. Cox; Alvin B. Giles; C. W. Hutton; Edwin L. Barker
- Products: Industrial, educational, promotional and dramatic films; film processing and printing

The Advance Motion Picture Company was an American silent film company based in Chicago. Founded in 1911, it specialized in commissioned industrial, educational and promotional films, including locally sponsored pictures of cities, businesses and public events. In 1913 it also undertook dramatic productions. By 1915, its advertising emphasized film developing and printing rather than production.

== History ==
=== Municipal and industrial films ===
Advance was organized in Chicago in February 1911 with capital stock of $2,000. By 1914, its capitalization had increased to $150,000. Its general offices were in the Peoples Gas Building, while its factory and studio were at 950 Edgecomb Place.

The company initially concentrated on topical and locally commissioned pictures. In 1911 it filmed an aviation meet and a Labor Day parade in Aurora, Illinois. The latter production, made for theater owner Frank Thielen, included the parade, local industries and crowds in Phillips Park. After its local premiere, it circulated through the Thielen theater circuit.

Advance generally obtained municipal work through theater managers, civic organizations and local commercial interests. In August 1912 its representatives proposed a film of Moline, Illinois, encompassing factories, streets, parks, churches, schools and public services. The company described such films as a means of municipal promotion: the completed picture would first be shown locally and then offered through a wider theatrical circuit. A surviving company letter from January 1913 stated that one advertisement directed at advertising firms and managers had produced 52 replies and an anticipated $500 contract. It also said that Advance had more work than its existing equipment could handle and expected to move to larger quarters by May.

By 1913, Advance was carrying out municipal and commercial assignments in several states. Alvin B. Giles, its advertising director, supervised films of businesses, parks, boulevards and apartment buildings in Kansas City, Missouri. The pictures were booked for approximately one hundred theatrical engagements, about half of them in Kansas City. Other work included a fashion film for a Cleveland department store and a 4,000-foot educational film commissioned by the Society for Electrical Development.

In April 1913, the company photographed Illinois governor Edward Fitzsimmons Dunne, members of the state legislature, Springfield officials and the city's fire department for a 1,500-foot local film. The same month, representative I. Mekatinsky arranged with W. C. Robertson of San Antonio's Princess Theatre to film the city's Fiesta, historic sites and military post. The resulting one-reel subject was advertised as The Battle of Flowers and the Fiesta of San Jacinto.

The company's local productions did not always match their original plans. In Jacksonville, Illinois, four reels were initially proposed, with separate reels devoted to the city, its industries, schools and organizations. An advertisement for the completed Jacksonville in Motion Pictures, however, stated that Advance's contract called for two reels. A company telegram explained that several intended scenes had been omitted because weather and static electricity had interfered with the photography.

Advance also recorded civic celebrations and local attractions. Its cameraman B. E. Newman photographed the Illinois Elks convention and parade at Rock Island, Illinois, in June 1913. Motion pictures taken in Vincennes, Indiana, during the July 4 celebrations included businesses, automobile races, a hill climb, the local baseball club and fire department; they were shown at the Moon Theatre from July 18 through 20.

In April 1914, George L. Cox and an assistant accompanied a two-week Southern tour organized by the Chicago Association of Commerce, filming the visiting delegation and local activities. Advance and the Chicago Feature Film Company photographed the tour's stop in Lexington, Kentucky, and Advance recorded approximately 600 feet during the subsequent visit to Atlanta.

=== Dramatic production ===
While continuing its commissioned work, Advance attempted to establish a dramatic-production department. In January 1913, Giles invited established scenario writers to apply for places on a company scenario staff. An April advertisement offered $1,000 for a script suitable for an unusual three- or four-reel feature, excluding Western and military subjects. Cox became general manager on July 1 and supervised the company's dramatic work.

The best-documented production from this period was the three-reel The Battle of Cameron Dam, a reconstruction of the conflict between John F. Dietz and a Wisconsin lumber company. Maibelle Heikes Justice wrote the scenario, and members of the Dietz family reenacted events at the original locations. The pictures received their first Milwaukee exhibition at the Alhambra Theatre in September 1913. The Dietz family subsequently exhibited the production while campaigning for John Dietz's pardon.

=== Later operations ===
By 1915, Advance's public emphasis had changed. An advertisement in The Moving Picture World offered developing and printing services, while the journal's index classified the firm under “Miscellaneous” rather than among manufacturers of moving pictures. Cox, who had formerly managed Advance's production operations, was associated with the Atlas Film Company by July.

That month, Advance announced a consolidation with the Barker-Swan Service. C. W. Hutton was named president, A. H. Shields secretary and Edwin L. Barker treasurer and general manager. In October, Booker T. Washington's secretary, Emmett Jay Scott, asked Barker whether Barker-Swan might consider filming Washington's autobiography, Up from Slavery. Scott offered the use of Tuskegee Institute, his services as a writer and consultant, and promotional assistance from the National Negro Business League and the Black press. Washington died the following month, and the proposed production was not made.

Later in October, Shields and other creditors filed an involuntary bankruptcy petition against Advance, reporting claims totaling $704. The outcome of the petition has not been located. Although the July consolidation notice stated that the combined business would continue under the Advance name, by December the trade press was again describing Barker-Swan as a separate corporation and reported its plans for a studio in Peoria.

== Selected films ==
Advance's output is incompletely documented because many of its sponsored productions circulated under descriptive or local titles.

Title or subject	Year	Notes
Chicago aviation meet	1911	Topical film produced with the cooperation of a local aero club.
Aurora Labor Day parade and city views	1911	Produced for Frank Thielen and circulated through his theater circuit.
Springfield officials and city views	1913	A 1,500-foot film featuring Governor Dunne, legislators, city commissioners and the fire department.
The Battle of Flowers and the Fiesta of San Jacinto	1913	One-reel film of San Antonio's Fiesta and local landmarks.
Jacksonville in Motion Pictures	1913	Two-reel municipal film; several intended scenes were omitted after poor photographic conditions.
Kansas City commercial and municipal films	1913	Views of businesses, parks, boulevards and apartment buildings.
Huntington churches, industries and city views	1913	Three-day assignment covering churches, Sunday schools, businesses and street scenes.
Rock Island Elks convention and parade	1913	Filmed by B. E. Newman in June.
Vincennes July 4 celebration and city views	1913	Exhibited at the Moon Theatre from July 18 through 20.
Mrs. Carter Worthington's Dilemma	1913	Three-reel feature.
The Battle of Cameron Dam	1913	Three-reel reconstruction written by Justice and produced under Cox's supervision.
The Girl of Wonder Cave	1913	Filmed at Wonder Cave near Monteagle, Tennessee.
Chicago Association of Commerce Southern tour	1914	Filmed by Cox and an assistant; documented stops include Lexington and Atlanta.
Made-in-La-Crosse	1914	Promotional film of La Crosse, Wisconsin, and its Homecoming Week events.
Tempo de Tango	c. 1914	Four-reel feature associated with Cox.
The Brighten-Up Crusade	c. 1914	Six-reel feature associated with Cox.
Sturgeon Bay street and harbor scenes	1915	Local film photographed by B. E. Newman.

Historian Martin Johnson also identifies untitled Advance productions made in Cedar Rapids, Iowa, and Green Bay, Wisconsin. In May 1913, Advance announced plans to film the Civil War drama A Battle Above the Clouds at Lookout Mountain during a Confederate veterans' reunion, but its completion has not been established.
