= Kiel Township, Lake of the Woods County, Minnesota =

Township in Minnesota, United States

Coordinates: 48.4107688°N 94.6246430°W

Kiel Township, Minnesota
- Township
- Location of Kiel Township, within Lake of the Woods County, Minnesota
- Country: United States
- State: Minnesota
- County: Lake of the Woods

Area
  - Total: 36.07 sq mi (93.4 km^{2})
  - Land: 35.97 sq mi (93.2 km^{2})
  - Water: 0.1 sq mi (0.26 km^{2})

Population (2020)
  - Total: 2
  - Density: 0.056/sq mi (0.021/km^{2})
- Time zone: UTC-6 (Central (CST))
  - Summer (DST): UTC-5 (CDT)
- Area code: 218

Kiel Township is a township in Lake of the Woods County, Minnesota, United States. The population was two at the 2020 census.

== Geography ==
According to the United States Census Bureau, the township has a total area of 36.1 square miles (93 km^{2}), of which 36.0 square miles (93 km^{2}) is land and 0.04 square miles (0.10 km^{2}) (0.06%) is water.

== Demographics ==
As of the census of 2000, there were 6 people, 5 households, and 1 family residing in the township. The population density was 0.2 people per square mile (0.1/km^{2}). There were 20 housing units at an average density of 0.6/sq mi (0.2/km^{2}). The racial makeup of the township was 100% White.

There were 5 households, out of which none had children under the age of 18 living with them, 20.0% were married couples living together, and 80.0% were non-families. 80.0% of all households were made up of individuals, and none had someone living alone who was 65 years of age or older. The average household size was 1.20 and the average family size was 2.00.

In the township the population was spread out, with 33.3% from 25 to 44, 33.3% from 45 to 64, and 33.3% who were 65 years of age or older. The median age was 58 years. For every 100 females, there were 500.0 males. For every 100 females age 18 and over, there were 500.0 males.
