= Baudette Township, Lake of the Woods County, Minnesota =

Township in Minnesota, United States

Coordinates: 48.7387845°N 94.6651760°W

Baudette Township, Minnesota
- Township
- Location of Baudette Township, within Lake of the Woods County, Minnesota
- Country: United States
- State: Minnesota
- County: Lake of the Woods

Area
  - Total: 10.64 sq mi (27.6 km^{2})
  - Land: 9.72 sq mi (25.2 km^{2})
  - Water: 0.92 sq mi (2.4 km^{2})

Population (2020)
  - Total: 323
  - Density: 33.2/sq mi (12.8/km^{2})
- Time zone: UTC-6 (Central (CST))
  - Summer (DST): UTC-5 (CDT)
- Area code: 218

Baudette Township is a township in Lake of the Woods County, Minnesota, United States. The population was 323 at the 2020 United States census.

== Geography ==
According to the United States Census Bureau, the township has a total area of 10.6 square miles (27 km^{2}), of which 9.5 square miles (25 km^{2}) is land and 1.1 square miles (2.8 km^{2}) (10.61%) is water.

== Demographics ==
As of the census of 2000, there were 357 people, 144 households, and 105 families residing in the township. The population density was 37.5 inhabitants per square mile (14.5/km^{2}). There were 200 housing units at an average density of 21.0/sq mi (8.1/km^{2}). The racial makeup of the township was 97.20% White, 1.40% Native American, 0.28% Asian, and 1.12% from two or more races.

There were 144 households, out of which 31.9% had children under the age of 18 living with them, 64.6% were married couples living together, 4.9% had a female householder with no husband present, and 26.4% were non-families. 21.5% of all households were made up of individuals, and 4.9% had someone living alone who was 65 years of age or older. The average household size was 2.48 and the average family size was 2.90.

In the township the population was spread out, with 27.5% under the age of 18, 5.6% from 18 to 24, 24.1% from 25 to 44, 28.6% from 45 to 64, and 14.3% who were 65 years of age or older. The median age was 41 years. For every 100 females, there were 107.6 males. For every 100 females age 18 and over, there were 114.0 males.

The median income for a household in the township was $31,953, and the median income for a family was $46,750. Males had a median income of $32,059 versus $33,875 for females. The per capita income for the township was $21,915. None of the families and 2.6% of the population were living below the poverty line, including no under eighteens and 9.7% of those over 64.
