= Swiftwater Township, Lake of the Woods County, Minnesota =

Township in Minnesota, United States

Coordinates: 48°29′51″N 94°36′49″W

Swiftwater Township, Minnesota
- Township
- Location of Swiftwater Township, within Lake of the Woods County, Minnesota
- Country: United States
- State: Minnesota
- County: Lake of the Woods

Area
  - Total: 36.03 sq mi (93.3 km^{2})
  - Land: 35.79 sq mi (92.7 km^{2})
  - Water: 0.23 sq mi (0.60 km^{2})

Population (2020)
  - Total: 66
  - Density: 1.8/sq mi (0.71/km^{2})
- Time zone: UTC-6 (Central (CST))
  - Summer (DST): UTC-5 (CDT)
- Area code: 218

Swiftwater Township is a township in Lake of the Woods County, Minnesota, United States. The population was 66 at the 2020 United States census.

== Geography ==
According to the United States Census Bureau, the township has a total area of 35.5 square miles (91.9 km^{2}), of which 35.5 square miles (91.8 km^{2}) is land and 0.04 square mile (0.1 km^{2}) (0.06%) is water.

== Demographics ==
As of the census of 2000, there were 77 people, 37 households, and 19 families residing in the township. The population density was 2.2 people per square mile (0.8/km^{2}). There were 58 housing units at an average density of 1.6/sq mi (0.6/km^{2}). The racial makeup of the township was 100.00% White.

There were 37 households, out of which 13.5% had children under the age of 18 living with them, 48.6% were married couples living together, and 48.6% were non-families. 35.1% of all households were made up of individuals, and 13.5% had someone living alone who was 65 years of age or older. The average household size was 2.08 and the average family size was 2.79.

In the township the population was spread out, with 13.0% under the age of 18, 6.5% from 18 to 24, 29.9% from 25 to 44, 31.2% from 45 to 64, and 19.5% who were 65 years of age or older. The median age was 45 years. For every 100 females, there were 120.0 males. For every 100 females age 18 and over, there were 131.0 males.

The median income for a household in the township was $28,750, and the median income for a family was $38,750. Males had a median income of $21,250 versus $25,667 for females. The per capita income for the township was $15,937. There were no families and 9.0% of the population living below the poverty line, including no under eighteens and none of those over 64.
