= Rulien Township, Lake of the Woods County, Minnesota =

Township in Minnesota, United States

Coordinates: 48°35′18″N 94°43′41″W

Rulien Township, Minnesota
- Township
- Location of Rulien Township, within Lake of the Woods County, Minnesota
- Country: United States
- State: Minnesota
- County: Lake of the Woods

Area
  - Total: 36.42 sq mi (94.3 km^{2})
  - Land: 36.37 sq mi (94.2 km^{2})
  - Water: 0.05 sq mi (0.13 km^{2})

Population (2020)
  - Total: 1
  - Density: 0.027/sq mi (0.011/km^{2})
- Time zone: UTC-6 (Central (CST))
  - Summer (DST): UTC-5 (CDT)
- Area code: 218

Rulien Township is a township in Lake of the Woods County, Minnesota United States. As of the 2020 United States census, the township had a total population of one.

== Geography ==
According to the United States Census Bureau, the township has a total surface area of 36.5 square miles (94.4 km^{2}), of which 36.4 square miles (94.3 km^{2}) is land and 0.04 square mile (0.1 km^{2}) is water. The total area is 0.08% water.

== Demographics ==
As of the census of 2000, there were three people, one household, and one family residing in the township. The population density was 0.1 people per square mile (0.0/km^{2}). There were six housing units at an average density of 0.2/sq mi (0.1/km^{2}). All residents were white.

There was one household, a married couple, both aged twenty-five to forty-four, with a son under 18. The median age was forty one years. The father had the sole income of $28,750.
