= Walhalla Township, Lake of the Woods County, Minnesota =

Township in Minnesota, United States

Coordinates: 48°40′22″N 94°45′10″W

Walhalla Township, Minnesota
- Township
- Location of Walhalla Township, within Lake of the Woods County, Minnesota
- Country: United States
- State: Minnesota
- County: Lake of the Woods

Area
  - Total: 34.94 sq mi (90.5 km^{2})
  - Land: 34.92 sq mi (90.4 km^{2})
  - Water: 0.02 sq mi (0.052 km^{2})

Population (2020)
  - Total: 146
  - Density: 4.18/sq mi (1.61/km^{2})
- Time zone: UTC-6 (Central (CST))
  - Summer (DST): UTC-5 (CDT)
- Area code: 218

Walhalla Township is a township in Lake of the Woods County, Minnesota, United States. The population was 146 at the 2020 United States census.

== Geography ==
According to the United States Census Bureau, the township has a total area of 34.8 square miles (90.2 km^{2}), all land.

== Demographics ==
As of the census of 2000, there were 156 people, 63 households, and 43 families residing in the township. The population density was 4.5 people per square mile (1.7/km^{2}). There were 71 housing units at an average density of 2.0/sq mi (0.8/km^{2}). The racial makeup of the township was 97.44% White, 0.64% African American, 1.92% from other races. Hispanic or Latino of any race were 2.56% of the population.

There were 63 households, out of which 34.9% had children under the age of 18 living with them, 60.3% were married couples living together, 6.3% had a female householder with no husband present, and 30.2% were non-families. 27.0% of all households were made up of individuals, and 14.3% had someone living alone who was 65 years of age or older. The average household size was 2.48 and the average family size was 3.02.

In the township the population was spread out, with 26.3% under the age of 18, 7.1% from 18 to 24, 24.4% from 25 to 44, 29.5% from 45 to 64, and 12.8% who were 65 years of age or older. The median age was 37 years. For every 100 females, there were 102.6 males. For every 100 females age 18 and over, there were 98.3 males.

The median income for a household in the township was $37,955, and the median income for a family was $39,432. Males had a median income of $26,641 versus $30,500 for females. The per capita income for the township was $19,990. None of the families and 4.9% of the population were living below the poverty line.
