= Myhre Township, Lake of the Woods County, Minnesota =

Township in Minnesota, United States

Coordinates: 48°44′57″N 95°01′18″W

Angle Township, Minnesota
- Township
- Location of Myhre Township, within Lake of the Woods County, Minnesota
- Country: United States
- State: Minnesota
- County: Lake of the Woods

Area
  - Total: 35.85 sq mi (92.9 km^{2})
  - Land: 35.79 sq mi (92.7 km^{2})
  - Water: 0.07 sq mi (0.18 km^{2})

Population (2020)
  - Total: 184
  - Density: 5.14/sq mi (1.98/km^{2})
- Time zone: UTC-6 (Central (CST))
  - Summer (DST): UTC-5 (CDT)
- Area code: 218

Myhre Township is a township in Lake of the Woods County, Minnesota, United States. The population was 184 at the 2020 United States census.

== Geography ==
According to the United States Census Bureau, the township has a total area of 35.8 square miles (92.7 km^{2}), of which 35.7 square miles (92.4 km^{2}) is land and 0.1 square mile (0.3 km^{2}) (0.28%) is water.

== Demographics ==
As of the census of 2000, there were 213 people, 76 households, and 59 families residing in the township. The population density was 6.0 people per square mile (2.3/km^{2}). There were 96 housing units at an average density of 2.7/sq mi (1.0/km^{2}). The racial makeup of the township was 96.71% White, 0.47% African American, 0.47% Asian, and 2.35% from two or more races.

There were 76 households, out of which 36.8% had children under the age of 18 living with them, 65.8% were married couples living together, 7.9% had a female householder with no husband present, and 21.1% were non-families. 21.1% of all households were made up of individuals, and 3.9% had someone living alone who was 65 years of age or older. The average household size was 2.80 and the average family size was 3.23.

In the township the population was spread out, with 32.4% under the age of 18, 5.2% from 18 to 24, 31.5% from 25 to 44, 22.5% from 45 to 64, and 8.5% who were 65 years of age or older. The median age was 36 years. For every 100 females, there were 106.8 males. For every 100 females age 18 and over, there were 108.7 males.

The median income for a household in the township was $31,563, and the median income for a family was $39,000. Males had a median income of $30,000 versus $17,143 for females. The per capita income for the township was $11,809. About 4.3% of families and 8.6% of the population were below the poverty line, including 14.0% of those under the age of 18 and 11.8% of those 65 or over.
