= Township 158-30, Lake of the Woods County, Minnesota =

Township in Minnesota, United States

Coordinates: 48°30′10″N 94°28′26″W

Township 158-30, Minnesota
- Township
- Location of Township 158-30, within Lake of the Woods County, Minnesota
- Country: United States
- State: Minnesota
- County: Lake of the Woods

Area
  - Total: 35.68 sq mi (92.4 km^{2})
  - Land: 35.51 sq mi (92.0 km^{2})
  - Water: 0.17 sq mi (0.44 km^{2})

Population (2020)
  - Total: 23
  - Density: 0.65/sq mi (0.25/km^{2})
- Time zone: UTC-6 (Central (CST))
  - Summer (DST): UTC-5 (CDT)
- Area code: 218

Township 158-30 is a township in Lake of the Woods County, Minnesota, United States. The population was 23 at the 2020 United States census.

== Geography ==
According to the United States Census Bureau, the township has a total area of 35.6 square miles (92.3 km^{2}), all land.

== Demographics ==
As of the census of 2000, there were 17 people, 8 households, and 5 families residing in the township. The population density was 0.5 people per square mile (0.2/km^{2}). There were 12 housing units at an average density of 0.3/sq mi (0.1/km^{2}). The racial makeup of the township was 100.00% White.

There were 8 households, out of which none had children under the age of 18 living with them, 50.0% were married couples living together, and 37.5% were non-families. 25.0% of all households were made up of individuals, and 12.5% had someone living alone who was 65 years of age or older. The average household size was 2.13 and the average family size was 2.40.

In the township the population was spread out, with 29.4% from 18 to 24, 35.3% from 25 to 44, 29.4% from 45 to 64, and 5.9% who were 65 years of age or older. The median age was 42 years. For every 100 females, there were 240.0 males. For every 100 females age 18 and over, there were 240.0 males.

The median income for a household in the township was $18,750, and the median income for a family was $18,750. Males had a median income of $0 versus $0 for females. The per capita income for the township was $9,500. None of the population or the families were below the poverty line.
