= Potamo Township, Lake of the Woods County, Minnesota =

Township in Minnesota, United States

Coordinates: 48.67542°N 94.89968°W

Potamo Township, Minnesota
- Township
- Location of Potamo Township, within Lake of the Woods County, Minnesota
- Country: United States
- State: Minnesota
- County: Lake of the Woods

Area
  - Total: 34.94 sq mi (90.5 km^{2})
  - Land: 34.93 sq mi (90.5 km^{2})
  - Water: 0.01 sq mi (0.026 km^{2})

Population (2020)
  - Total: 85
  - Density: 2.4/sq mi (0.94/km^{2})
- Time zone: UTC-6 (Central (CST))
  - Summer (DST): UTC-5 (CDT)
- Area code: 218

Potamo Township is a township in Lake of the Woods County, Minnesota, United States. The population was 85 at the 2020 United States census.

== Geography ==
According to the United States Census Bureau, the township has a total area of 35.0 square miles (90.7 km^{2}), all land.

== Demographics ==
As of the census of 2000, there were 109 people, 43 households, and 32 families residing in the township. The population density was 3.1 people per square mile (1.2/km^{2}). There were 62 housing units at an average density of 1.8/sq mi (0.7/km^{2}). The racial makeup of the township was 98.17% White and 1.83% Asian.

There were 43 households, out of which 41.9% had children under the age of 18 living with them, 65.1% were married couples living together, 4.7% had a female householder with no husband present, and 23.3% were non-families. 20.9% of all households were made up of individuals, and 4.7% had someone living alone who was 65 years of age or older. The average household size was 2.53 and the average family size was 2.91.

In the township the population was spread out, with 27.5% under the age of 18, 8.3% from 18 to 24, 23.9% from 25 to 44, 31.2% from 45 to 64, and 9.2% who were 65 years of age or older. The median age was 39 years. For every 100 females, there were 101.9 males. For every 100 females age 18 and over, there were 113.5 males.

The median income for a household in the township was $41,000, and the median income for a family was $45,000. Males had a median income of $26,528 versus $14,205 for females. The per capita income for the township was $20,806. There were no families and 14.7% of the population living below the poverty line, including no under eighteens and none of those over 64.
