= Chilgren Township, Lake of the Woods County, Minnesota =

Township in Minnesota, United States

Coordinates: 48.8437075°N 95.0249520°W

Chilgren Township, Minnesota
- Township
- Location of Chilgren Township, within Lake of the Woods County, Minnesota
- Country: United States
- State: Minnesota
- County: Lake of the Woods

Area
  - Total: 35.95 sq mi (93.1 km^{2})
  - Land: 35.92 sq mi (93.0 km^{2})
  - Water: 0.03 sq mi (0.078 km^{2})

Population (2020)
  - Total: 162
  - Density: 4.51/sq mi (1.74/km^{2})
- Time zone: UTC-6 (Central (CST))
  - Summer (DST): UTC-5 (CDT)
- Area code: 218

Chilgren Township is a township in Lake of the Woods County, Minnesota, United States. The population was 162 at the 2020 United States census.

== Geography ==
According to the United States Census Bureau, the township has a total area of 36.0 square miles (93 km^{2}), of which 35.9 square miles (93 km^{2}) is land and 0.04 square miles (0.10 km^{2}) (0.08%) is water.

== Demographics ==
As of the census of 2000, there were 179 people, 67 households, and 46 families residing in the township. The population density was 5.0 people per square mile (1.9/km^{2}). There were 89 housing units at an average density of 2.5/sq mi (1.0/km^{2}). The racial makeup of the township was 98.88% White, and 1.12% from two or more races.

There were 67 households, out of which 37.3% had children under the age of 18 living with them, 64.2% were married couples living together, 1.5% had a female householder with no husband present, and 31.3% were non-families. 29.9% of all households were made up of individuals, and 10.4% had someone living alone who was 65 years of age or older. The average household size was 2.67 and the average family size was 3.39.

In the township the population was spread out, with 31.8% under the age of 18, 3.9% from 18 to 24, 31.3% from 25 to 44, 24.6% from 45 to 64, and 8.4% who were 65 years of age or older. The median age was 35 years. For every 100 females, there were 110.6 males. For every 100 females age 18 and over, there were 139.2 males.

The median income for a household in the township was $25,000, and the median income for a family was $17,000. Males had a median income of $30,156 versus $36,250 for females. The per capita income for the township was $10,239. About 34.6% of families and 29.1% of the population were below the poverty line, including 24.7% of those under the age of 18 and none of those 65 or over.
