= Wabanica Township, Lake of the Woods County, Minnesota =

Township in Minnesota, United States

Coordinates: 48°46′27″N 94°47′48″W

Wabanica Township, Minnesota
- Township
- Location of Wabanica Township, within Lake of the Woods County, Minnesota
- Country: United States
- State: Minnesota
- County: Lake of the Woods

Area
  - Total: 36.08 sq mi (93.4 km^{2})
  - Land: 35.84 sq mi (92.8 km^{2})
  - Water: 0.24 sq mi (0.62 km^{2})

Population (2020)
  - Total: 248
  - Density: 6.92/sq mi (2.67/km^{2})
- Time zone: UTC-6 (Central (CST))
  - Summer (DST): UTC-5 (CDT)
- Area code: 218

Wabanica Township is a township in Lake of the Woods County, Minnesota, United States. The population was 248 at the 2020 United States census.

== Geography ==
According to the United States Census Bureau, the township has a total area of 36.1 square miles (93.4 km^{2}), of which 35.9 square miles (92.9 km^{2}) is land and 0.2 square mile (0.5 km^{2}) (0.58%) is water.

== Demographics ==
As of the census of 2000, there were 291 people, 116 households, and 90 families residing in the township. The population density was 8.1 people per square mile (3.1/km^{2}). There were 171 housing units at an average density of 4.8/sq mi (1.8/km^{2}). The racial makeup of the township was 100.00% White. Hispanic or Latino of any race were 1.03% of the population.

There were 116 households, out of which 34.5% had children under the age of 18 living with them, 69.8% were married couples living together, 1.7% had a female householder with no husband present, and 22.4% were non-families. 18.1% of all households were made up of individuals, and 7.8% had someone living alone who was 65 years of age or older. The average household size was 2.51 and the average family size was 2.87.

In the township the population was spread out, with 24.4% under the age of 18, 4.5% from 18 to 24, 26.1% from 25 to 44, 24.4% from 45 to 64, and 20.6% who were 65 years of age or older. The median age was 43 years. For every 100 females, there were 109.4 males. For every 100 females age 18 and over, there were 107.5 males.

The median income for a household in the township was $29,318, and the median income for a family was $27,426. Males had a median income of $18,875 versus $18,958 for females. The per capita income for the township was $12,429. About 8.7% of families and 8.0% of the population were below the poverty line, including 7.1% of those under the age of 18 and none of those 65 or over.
