= Township 157-30, Lake of the Woods County, Minnesota =

Township in Minnesota, United States

Coordinates: 48°23′40″N 94°31′20″W

Township 157-30, Minnesota
- Township
- Location of Township 157-30, within Lake of the Woods County, Minnesota
- Country: United States
- State: Minnesota
- County: Lake of the Woods

Area
  - Total: 36.01 sq mi (93.3 km^{2})
  - Land: 36.0 sq mi (93 km^{2})
  - Water: 0.01 sq mi (0.026 km^{2})

Population (2020)
  - Total: 0
  - Density: 0.0/sq mi (0.0/km^{2})
- Time zone: UTC-6 (Central (CST))
  - Summer (DST): UTC-5 (CDT)
- Area code: 218

Township 157-30 is a township in Lake of the Woods County, Minnesota, United States. The 2020 United States census population was zero, making this township uninhabited.

== Geography ==
According to the United States Census Bureau, the township has a total area of 36.0 square miles (93.1 km^{2}), all land.

== Demographics ==
As of the census of 2000, there were 4 people, 2 households, and 2 families residing in the township. The population density was 0.1 people per square mile (0.0/km^{2}). There were 2 housing units at an average density of 0.1/sq mi (0.0/km^{2}). The racial makeup of the township was 100% White.

There were 2 households which both had children under the age of 18 living with them, none were married couples living together, and none were non-families. No households were made up of individuals, and none had someone living alone who was 65 years of age or older. The average household size was 2.00 and the average family size was 2.00.

In the township the population was spread out, with 50.0% under the age of 18, 50.0% from 45 to 64. The median age was 31 years. For every 100 females, there were 100 males. For every 100 females age 18 and over, there were no males.
