= Lude, Minnesota =

Human settlement in Lake of the Woods County, Minnesota, US

Coordinates: 48.952222°N 94.931944°W

Lude was an unincorporated community in Lake of the Woods County, Minnesota, United States.

The community was located southeast of Long Point on Lude Road, now Lake of the Woods County Road 52. A post office operated in Lude—with Alexander Lude as postmaster—from 1904 to 1934; all traces of the building have been removed. The community of Birch Beach has replaced what used to be Lude.
