= Graceton, Minnesota =

- Unincorporated community
- Location within Minnesota Location within the United States
- Coordinates: 48°44′28″N 94°50′11″W
- Country: United States
- State: Minnesota
- County: Lake of the Woods
- Township: McDougald
- Elevation: 1,135 ft (346 m)
- Time zone: UTC-6 (Central (CST))
  - Summer (DST): UTC-5 (CDT)
- Area code: 218
- GNIS feature ID: 644307

Graceton is an unincorporated community in Lake of the Woods County, Minnesota, United States.

The community is located west of Baudette on Minnesota Highway 11 at the intersection with Lake of the Woods County Road 4. It once had a station on the Canadian Pacific line, but is now a whistle stop.

Graceton was largely burned to the ground in the Baudette Fire of 1910.

The city shares a name with the nearby Graceton Wildlife Management Area (WMA), which is approximately 2.5 miles away from the community. The park was created in 2000 and is 10,708.8 acres, and features sphagnum wetlands.
