= Birch Beach, Minnesota =

- Unincorporated community
- Location within Minnesota Location within the United States
- Coordinates: 48°57′9″N 94°55′54″W
- Country: United States
- State: Minnesota
- County: Lake of the Woods
- Township: Prosper
- Elevation: 1,070 ft (330 m)
- Time zone: UTC-6 (Central (CST))
  - Summer (DST): UTC-5 (CDT)
- Area code: 218
- GNIS feature ID: 640156

Birch Beach is an unincorporated community approximately 15 miles north of Williams, Lake of the Woods County, Minnesota, United States. It lies along the southern shore of Lake of the Woods, southeast of Long Point.

County Road 52, also known as Birch Beach Drive, leads to the community, which consists of a series of roughly 60 houses and cabins along the road.
