= Zippel Township, Lake of the Woods County, Minnesota =

Township in Minnesota, United States

Coordinates: 48°49′58″N 94°54′22″W

Zippel Township, Minnesota
- Township
- Location of Zippel Township, within Lake of the Woods County, Minnesota
- Country: United States
- State: Minnesota
- County: Lake of the Woods

Area
  - Total: 33.28 sq mi (86.2 km^{2})
  - Land: 32.7 sq mi (85 km^{2})
  - Water: 0.58 sq mi (1.5 km^{2})

Population (2020)
  - Total: 105
  - Density: 3.21/sq mi (1.24/km^{2})
- Time zone: UTC-6 (Central (CST))
  - Summer (DST): UTC-5 (CDT)
- Area code: 218

Zippel Township is a township in Lake of the Woods County, Minnesota, United States. The population was 105 at the 2020 United States census.

== Geography ==
According to the United States Census Bureau, the township has a total area of 33.3 square miles (86.2 km^{2}), of which 32.6 square miles (84.5 km^{2}) is land and 0.7 square mile (1.7 km^{2}) (1.98%) is water.

== Demographics ==
As of the census of 2000, there were 140 people, 61 households, and 43 families residing in the township. The population density was 4.3 people per square mile (1.7/km^{2}). There were 142 housing units at an average density of 4.4/sq mi (1.7/km^{2}). The racial makeup of the township was 99.29% White, and 0.71% from two or more races.

There were 61 households, out of which 21.3% had children under the age of 18 living with them, 65.6% were married couples living together, and 27.9% were non-families. 24.6% of all households were made up of individuals, and 8.2% had someone living alone who was 65 years of age or older. The average household size was 2.30 and the average family size was 2.75.

In the township the population was spread out, with 18.6% under the age of 18, 5.0% from 18 to 24, 26.4% from 25 to 44, 33.6% from 45 to 64, and 16.4% who were 65 years of age or older. The median age was 45 years. For every 100 females, there were 141.4 males. For every 100 females age 18 and over, there were 128.0 males.

The median income for a household in the township was $20,750, and the median income for a family was $32,500. Males had a median income of $33,750 versus $26,250 for females. The per capita income for the township was $22,272. There were none of the families and 24.3% of the population living below the poverty line, including no under eighteens and 33.3% of those over 64.
