= Spooner Township, Lake of the Woods County, Minnesota =

Township in Minnesota, United States

Coordinates: 48°39′31″N 94°38′13″W

Spooner Township, Minnesota
- Township
- Location of Spooner Township, within Lake of the Woods County, Minnesota
- Country: United States
- State: Minnesota
- County: Lake of the Woods

Area
  - Total: 33.12 sq mi (85.8 km^{2})
  - Land: 33.03 sq mi (85.5 km^{2})
  - Water: 0.09 sq mi (0.23 km^{2})

Population (2020)
  - Total: 201
  - Density: 6.09/sq mi (2.35/km^{2})
- Time zone: UTC-6 (Central (CST))
  - Summer (DST): UTC-5 (CDT)
- Area code: 218

Spooner Township is a township in Lake of the Woods County, Minnesota, United States. The population was 201 at the 2020 census.

== History ==
The township was named for Marshall Spooner, a state judge. Spooner was largely destroyed in the Baudette Fire of 1910. Spooner Township adjoined the Village of Spooner, which merged with Baudette in 1954.

== Geography ==
According to the United States Census Bureau, the township has a total area of 33.5 square miles (86.9 km^{2}), of which 33.5 square miles (86.7 km^{2}) is land and 0.1 square mile (0.2 km^{2}) (0.21%) is water.

== Demographics ==
As of the census of 2000, there were 281 people, 113 households, and 77 families residing in the township. The population density was 8.4 people per square mile (3.2/km^{2}). There were 129 housing units at an average density of 3.9/sq mi (1.5/km^{2}). The racial makeup of the township was 96.09% White, 2.14% Native American, 0.36% Asian, and 1.42% from two or more races. Hispanic or Latino of any race were 0.36% of the population.

There were 113 households, out of which 40.7% had children under the age of 18 living with them, 62.8% were married couples living together, 5.3% had a female householder with no husband present, and 31.0% were non-families. 29.2% of all households were made up of individuals, and 11.5% had someone living alone who was 65 years of age or older. The average household size was 2.49 and the average family size was 3.08.

In the township the population was spread out, with 28.1% under the age of 18, 5.7% from 18 to 24, 30.6% from 25 to 44, 25.3% from 45 to 64, and 10.3% who were 65 years of age or older. The median age was 38 years. For every 100 females, there were 88.6 males. For every 100 females age 18 and over, there were 88.8 males.

The median income for a household in the township was $36,389, and the median income for a family was $50,556. Males had a median income of $48,125 versus $24,432 for females. The per capita income for the township was $21,978. About 12.5% of families and 21.1% of the population were below the poverty line, including 30.2% of those under the age of 18 and 17.1% of those 65 or over.

== Notable people ==
The artist Maurice Noble was born in Spooner, and the automotive designer Edmund E. Anderson grew up there.
