= Victory Township, Lake of the Woods County, Minnesota =

Township in Minnesota, United States

Coordinates: 48°28′56″N 94°44′08″W

Victory Township, Minnesota
- Township
- Location of Victory Township, within Lake of the Woods County, Minnesota
- Country: United States
- State: Minnesota
- County: Lake of the Woods

Area
  - Total: 35.75 sq mi (92.6 km^{2})
  - Land: 35.70 sq mi (92.5 km^{2})
  - Water: 0.05 sq mi (0.13 km^{2})

Population (2020)
  - Total: 3
  - Density: 0.084/sq mi (0.032/km^{2})
- Time zone: UTC-6 (Central (CST))
  - Summer (DST): UTC-5 (CDT)
- Area code: 218

Victory Township is a township in Lake of the Woods County, Minnesota, United States. The 2020 United States census population was three.

== Geography ==
According to the United States Census Bureau, the township has a total area of 35.8 square miles (92.7 km^{2}), of which 35.8 square miles (92.6 km^{2}) is land and 0.04 square mile (0.1 km^{2}) (0.11%) is water.

== Demographics ==
As of the census of 2000, there were 4 people, 3 households, and 0 families residing in the township. The population density was 0.1 people per square mile (0.0/km^{2}). There were 6 housing units at an average density of 0.2/sq mi (0.1/km^{2}). The racial makeup of the township was 100.00% White.

There were 3 households, out of which 33.3% were married couples living together, and 66.7% were non-families. 66.7% of all households were made up of individuals, and 33.3% had someone living alone who was 65 years of age or older. The average household size was 1.33 and the average family size was 2.00.

In the township the population was spread out, with 25.0% from 45 to 64, and 75.0% who were 65 years of age or older. The median age was 74 years. For every 100 females, there were 300.0 males. For every 100 females age 18 and over, there were 300.0 males.
