= Gudrid Township, Lake of the Woods County, Minnesota =

Township in Minnesota, United States

Coordinates: 48.6639890°N 94.4971930°W

Gudrid Township, Minnesota
- Township
- Location of Gudrid Township, within Lake of the Woods County, Minnesota
- Country: United States
- State: Minnesota
- County: Lake of the Woods

Area
  - Total: 29.55 sq mi (76.5 km^{2})
  - Land: 28.84 sq mi (74.7 km^{2})
  - Water: 0.71 sq mi (1.8 km^{2})

Population (2020)
  - Total: 184
  - Density: 6.38/sq mi (2.46/km^{2})
- Time zone: UTC-6 (Central (CST))
  - Summer (DST): UTC-5 (CDT)
- Area code: 218

Gudrid Township is a township in Lake of the Woods County, Minnesota, United States. The population was 184 at the 2020 United States census.

== Geography ==
According to the United States Census Bureau, the township has a total area of 29.1 square miles (75 km^{2}), of which 28.4 square miles (74 km^{2}) is land and 0.8 square miles (2.1 km^{2}) (2.61%) is water.

== Demographics ==
As of the census of 2000, there were 235 people, 91 households, and 72 families residing in the township. The population density was 8.3 people per square mile (3.2/km^{2}). There were 122 housing units at an average density of 4.3/sq mi (1.7/km^{2}). The racial makeup of the township was 98.72% White, and 1.28% from two or more races. Hispanic or Latino of any race were 1.70% of the population.

There were 91 households, out of which 33.0% had children under the age of 18 living with them, 74.7% were married couples living together, 3.3% had a female householder with no husband present, and 19.8% were non-families. 18.7% of all households were made up of individuals, and 13.2% had someone living alone who was 65 years of age or older. The average household size was 2.58 and the average family size was 2.92.

In the township the population was spread out, with 26.0% under the age of 18, 5.1% from 18 to 24, 20.9% from 25 to 44, 32.3% from 45 to 64, and 15.7% who were 65 years of age or older. The median age was 44 years. For every 100 females, there were 104.3 males. For every 100 females age 18 and over, there were 97.7 males.

The median income for a household in the township was $47,955, and the median income for a family was $49,432. Males had a median income of $42,083 versus $35,125 for females. The per capita income for the township was $22,074. None of the families and 1.3% of the population were living below the poverty line, including no under eighteens and 7.1% of those over 64.
