= Zippel Bay State Park =

State park in Lake of the Woods County, Minnesota

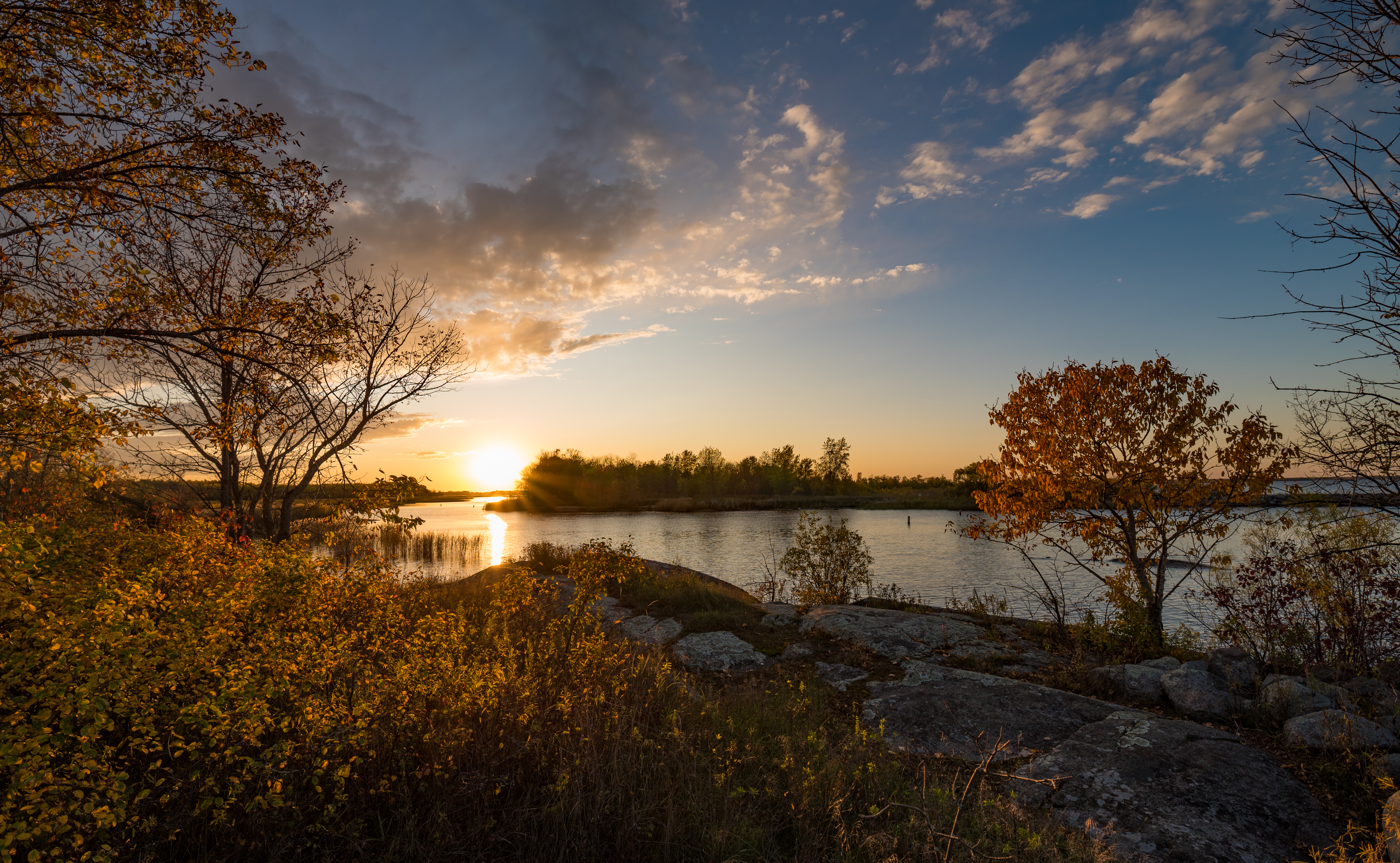
- The entrance to Zippel Bay on Lake of the Woods, from Zippel Bay State Park

- Location within Minnesota
- Location: Lake of the Woods County, Minnesota, United States
- Coordinates: 48°51′50″N 94°51′34″W
- Area: 2,906 acres (11.76 km^{2})
- Elevation: 1,083 ft (330 m)
- Established: 1959
- Named for: Wilhelm Zippel
- Visitors: 23109
- Governing body: Minnesota Department of Natural Resources
- Website: Zippel Bay State Park

Zippel Bay State Park is a state park in Lake of the Woods County, Minnesota in the United States. It is on the white sand beach shoreline of the Lake of the Woods, near the United States border with Canada. The park is open for year-round recreation including camping, hiking, fishing and cross-country skiing.

== History ==
The history of human habitation in the Zippel Bay area of Lake of the Woods dates back to prehistoric times. Evidence of their settlements have been found along the Rainy River just east of the bay. The first Europeans in the area were the French explorers of New France. Coureur des bois Pierre La Vérendrye passed through the area in 1732 and reported settlements of the Cree, Monsoni, Dakota, and Assiniboine tribes. These natives preceded the Ojibwe who were pushed into the area by European-American settlers as they pushed their way west through Canada and the United States.

La Vérendrye built Fort St. Pierre, a small post on Rainy River. La Vérendrye next established a strong French foothold in the area at Fort St. Charles on what is now known as Magnuson's Island. From here, French-Canadian voyageurs explored a large section of mid-continent North America, constructed other forts, and conducted fur trading, whose revenues were critical to the economy of the colony. The "golden age" of the French-Canadian fur trade lasted for 30 years before they were forced to abandon their forts at the end of the French and Indian War in 1763. As a result, the area came under the jurisdiction of the British. Transfer of the area to the rule of the United States occurred at the conclusion of the American Revolutionary War when the Treaty of Paris was signed in 1783. The exact boundary was not established until 1842. This was due to confusion about the precise location of the "northwest corner of Lake of the Woods." After 50 years of controversy and confusion the matter was officially settled when the official boundary was established.

Wilhelm Zippel was one of the first permanent settlers in the area. He moved to the area in 1887 and built a home on a peninsula near the entrance of Zippel Bay. Zippel and his family established a commercial fishing enterprise on the lake. A small fishing village also was established in the area and was thriving by 1909. The village included a post office, cold-storage building and homes for the fishermen. There is little evidence of the remains of the village besides foundations, debris and depressions in the land. Zippel Bay State Park was established in 1959 to provide public access to Lake of the Woods and provide recreational opportunities in the area. Construction of the park did not get underway until 1963 and was completed in 1967.

== Ecology ==
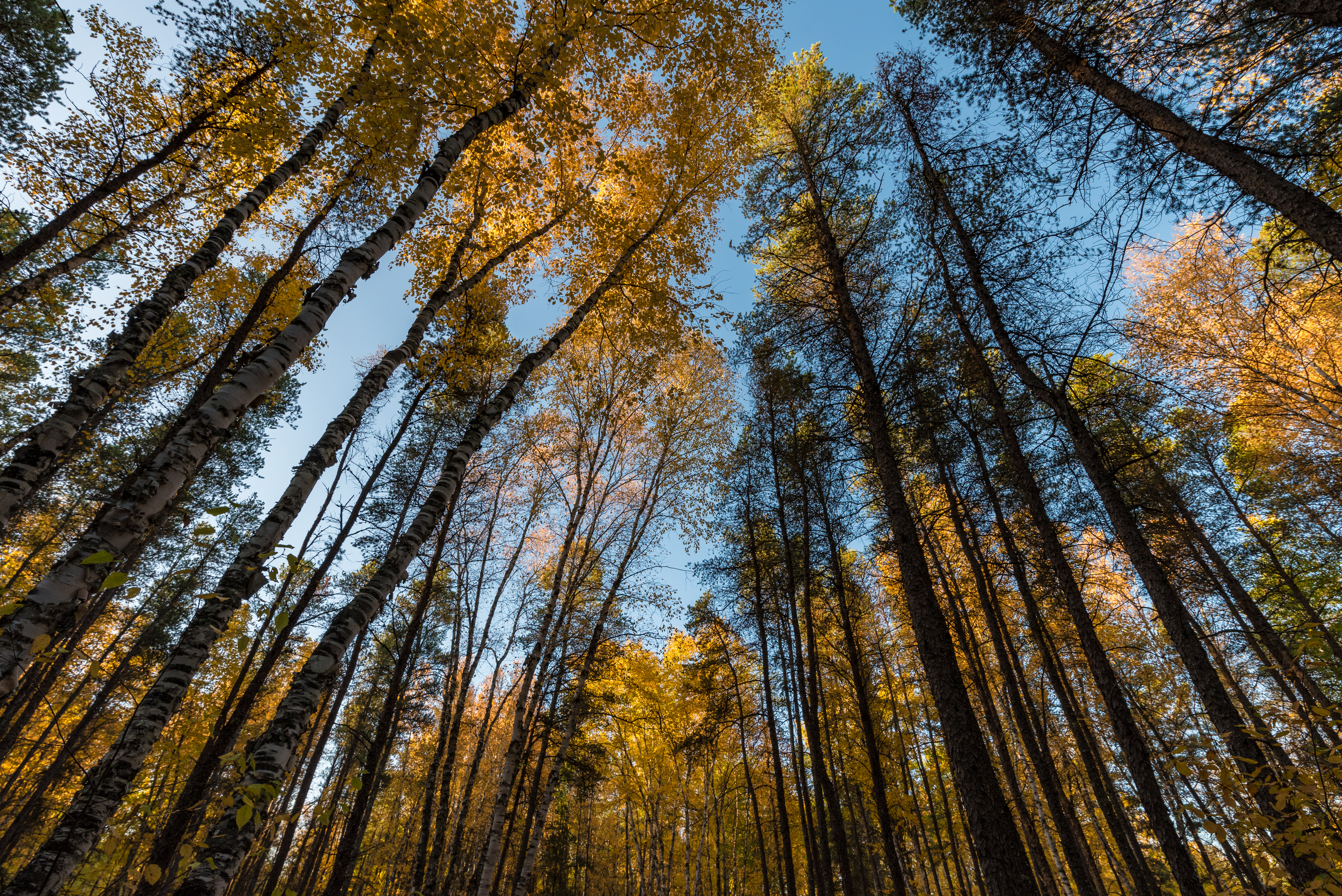
Autumn colors in the park

Zippel Bay State Park is home to a diverse population of jack pine, birch and quaking aspen trees. Other plants in the area include choke cherries, blueberries, cranberries, juneberries, pin cherries, strawberries and mushrooms. The plant life attracts herbivores like western moose and Dakota white-tailed deer. Other wildlife in the park include eastern black bears, northeastern coyotes, Hudson Bay minks, fishers, North American river otters and the rarely seen American marten. Great Lakes wolves have also been sighted in this park.

The shoreline of Lake of the Woods attract a wide variety of shorebirds, water fowl and birds of prey. Sandhill cranes nest on the northern side of Zippel Bay. The bay is one of four known breeding areas for the rare piping plover. The plover is nearing extinction in the Great Lakes region of North America. Other birds found in the park include American white pelicans, Franklin's and Bonaparte's gulls, double-crested cormorants, and several species of terns. Ospreys and bald eagles nest within this park.

== Geology ==
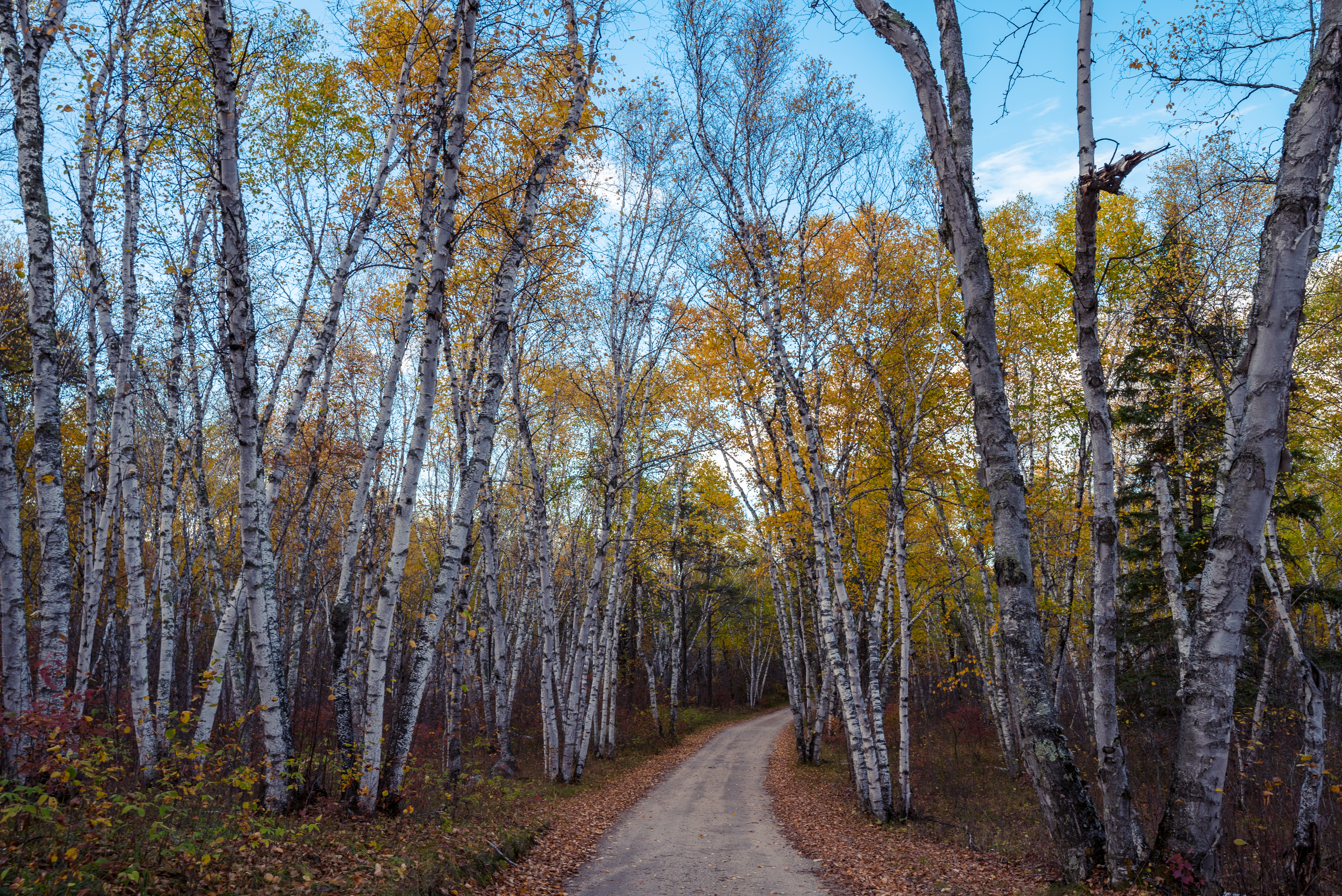
A road in the park

Zippel Bay State Park is in a part of Minnesota that was at one time part of a glacial lake, Lake Agassiz. Lake of the Woods is a remnant of the glacial lake. The glacial history of northern Minnesota created areas of peatlands and sandy mineral rich soil. The topography of the area is generally gently sloped with some abrupt slopes that are former beaches of Lake of the Woods. Several rock outcrops a scattered around the shores of the lake and the bay.

== Recreation ==
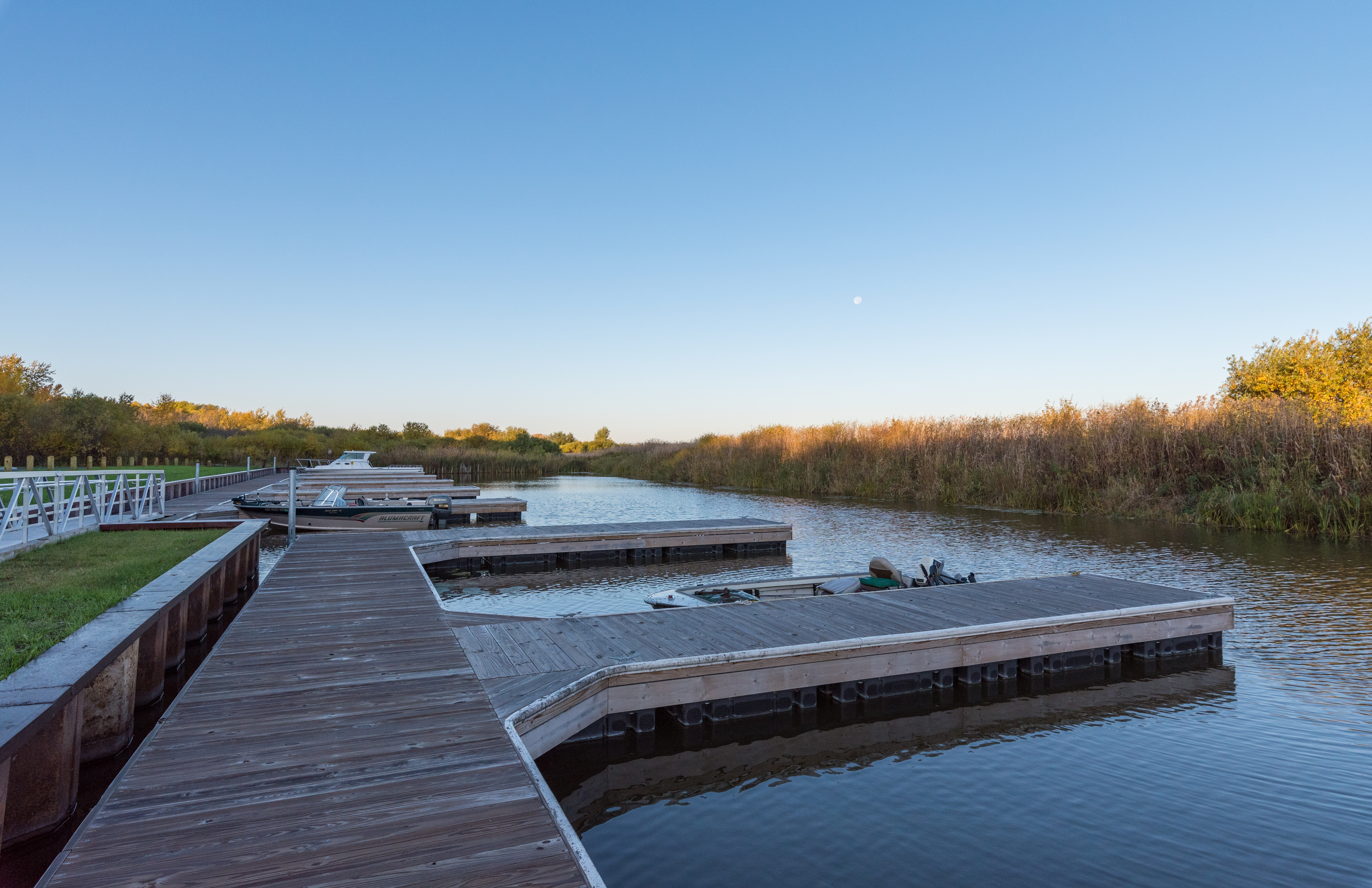
Zippel Bay Marina

Zippel Bay State Park is open for year-round recreation with fishing being the primary attraction. Lake of the Woods has an abundance of walleye and sauger which is a smaller relative of the walleye. Other fish caught in the lake at the park include perch, muskellunge and smallmouth bass.

Lake sturgeon are rarely caught in the modern era, but they do play a role in the history of the park. Wilhelm Zippel built his fishing business on sturgeon. The sturgeon were caught for their valuable eggs, caviar. The fish were butchered and sent to market. The fish that can weigh up to 250 pounds (110 kg) and reach an age of 100 are occasionally caught by anglers at the park.

Zippel Bay State Park has two campgrounds with 57 campsites and one group camping area for organizations like the Boy Scouts. The camping areas have showers and vault toilets with dumping stations available for campers with recreational vehicles. The park has 6 miles (9.7 km) of hiking trails, 11 miles (18 km) of cross-country skiing trails and 3 miles (4.8 km) of snow mobile trails. Additionally Zippel Bay State Park has picnic facilities including separate tables and a pavilion, a swimming area, boat ramps and a fishing pier.
