= Pitt, Minnesota =

Ghost in Lake of the Woods County, Minnesota, US

Coordinates: 48°43′03″N 94°44′10″W

Pitt is a ghost town in Lake of the Woods County, Minnesota, United States.

The community is located west of Baudette on Minnesota State Highway 11 at the intersection with Lake of the Woods County Road 6.

== History ==
The settlement was named for a large gravel pit nearby. A post office was in operation in Pitt from 1903 to 1993. Pitt had a station on the Canadian Pacific railway line, but it has since been removed and is now only a whistle stop. The only building visible by public road in Pitt is a boarded-up general store advertising "knives and wild rice" that closed in the 1990s, which was the original home of Pitt's very first settlers Herbert and Mamie Sanborn in 1901. It was moved from west of the bridge in Pitt to its current location and later became a grocery store. It is the only early 1900s building left standing. North of the store is the Pitt community church, still in use by the remaining locals. The schoolhouse remains just west of the general store, but other than the water pump in the yard, has been converted into a private residence. To the north of the railroad tracks is a lot where pulpwood is handled.

Pitt was burned in the Baudette Fire of 1910.
