= Lakewood Township, Lake of the Woods County, Minnesota =

Township in Minnesota, United States

Coordinates: 48.9258185°N 95.0194390°W

Lakewood Township, Minnesota
- Township
- Location of Lakewood Township, within Lake of the Woods County, Minnesota
- Country: United States
- State: Minnesota
- County: Lake of the Woods

Area
  - Total: 30.94 sq mi (80.1 km^{2})
  - Land: 30.82 sq mi (79.8 km^{2})
  - Water: 0.12 sq mi (0.31 km^{2})

Population (2020)
  - Total: 68
  - Density: 2.2/sq mi (0.85/km^{2})
- Time zone: UTC-6 (Central (CST))
  - Summer (DST): UTC-5 (CDT)
- Area code: 218

Lakewood Township is a township in Lake of the Woods County, Minnesota, United States. The population was 68 at the 2020 United States census. It borders the Lake of the Woods.

== Geography ==
According to the United States Census Bureau, the township has a total area of 31.0 square miles (80 km^{2}), of which 31.0 square miles (80 km^{2}) is land and 0.1 square miles (0.26 km^{2}) (0.23%) is water.

== Demographics ==
As of the census of 2000, there were 116 people, 52 households, and 31 families residing in the township. The population density was 3.7 people per square mile (1.4/km^{2}). There were 350 housing units at an average density of 11.3/sq mi (4.4/km^{2}). The racial makeup of the township was 100.00% White. Hispanic or Latino of any race were 1.72% of the population.

There were 52 households, out of which 19.2% had children under the age of 18 living with them, 50.0% were married couples living together, 1.9% had a female householder with no husband present, and 38.5% were non-families. 30.8% of all households were made up of individuals, and 17.3% had someone living alone who was 65 years of age or older. The average household size was 2.23 and the average family size was 2.72.

In the township the population was spread out, with 19.8% under the age of 18, 5.2% from 18 to 24, 27.6% from 25 to 44, 30.2% from 45 to 64, and 17.2% who were 65 years of age or older. The median age was 44 years. For every 100 females, there were 118.9 males. For every 100 females age 18 and over, there were 132.5 males.

The median income for a household in the township was $33,472, and the median income for a family was $35,714. Males had a median income of $25,417 versus $23,750 for females. The per capita income for the township was $12,599. None of the population and none of the families were below the poverty line.
