= Forest Area Township, Lake of the Woods County, Minnesota =

Township in Minnesota, United States

Coordinates: 48.5337830°N 95.0430150°W

Forest Area Township, Minnesota
- Township
- Location of Forest Area Township, within Lake of the Woods County, Minnesota
- Country: United States
- State: Minnesota
- County: Lake of the Woods

Area
  - Total: 502.38 sq mi (1,301.2 km^{2})
  - Land: 501.12 sq mi (1,297.9 km^{2})
  - Water: 1.26 sq mi (3.3 km^{2})

Population (2020)
  - Total: 0
  - Density: 0.0/sq mi (0.0/km^{2})
- Time zone: UTC-6 (Central (CST))
  - Summer (DST): UTC-5 (CDT)
- Area code: 218

Forest Area Township is a township in Lake of the Woods County, Minnesota, United States. The population has been uninhabited as of the 2020 census, which is down from five at the 2010 census.

== Geography ==
According to the United States Census Bureau, the township has a total area of 503.7 square miles (1,305 km^{2}), of which 502.8 square miles (1,302 km^{2}) is land and 0.9 square miles (2.3 km^{2}) (0.18%) is water.

== Demographics ==
As of the census of 2000, there were 7 people, 5 households, and 1 family residing in the township. The population density was 0.0/mi^{2} (0.0/km^{2}). There were 37 housing units at an average density of 0.1/mi^{2} (0.0/km^{2}). The racial makeup of the township was 100.00% White.

There were 5 households, out of which 20.0% had children under the age of 18 living with them, 20.0% were married couples living together, and 80.0% were non-families. 80.0% of all households were made up of individuals. The average household size was 1.40 and the average family size was 3.00.

In the township the population was spread out, with 14.3% under the age of 18, 14.3% from 18 to 24, 28.6% from 25 to 44, and 42.9% from 45 to 64. The median age was 42 years. For every 100 females, there were 250.0 males. For every 100 females age 18 and over, there were 200.0 males.

The median income for a household in the township was $36,250, and the median income for a family was $0. Males had a median income of $36,250 versus $0 for females. The per capita income for the township was $35,000. None of the population was below the poverty line.
