= Baudette fire of 1910 =

Wildfire in Minnesota, United States

Coordinates: 48°42′N 94°35′W

Baudette Fire
- Date: October 7, 1910
- Location: Beltrami County, Minnesota (now in Lake of the Woods County, Minnesota)

Statistics
- Burned area: 300,000 acres (1,200 km^{2})
- Land use: Logging

Impacts
- Deaths: 29-42

Ignition
- Cause: Drought, sparks from trains, small brush fires, camp fires left going

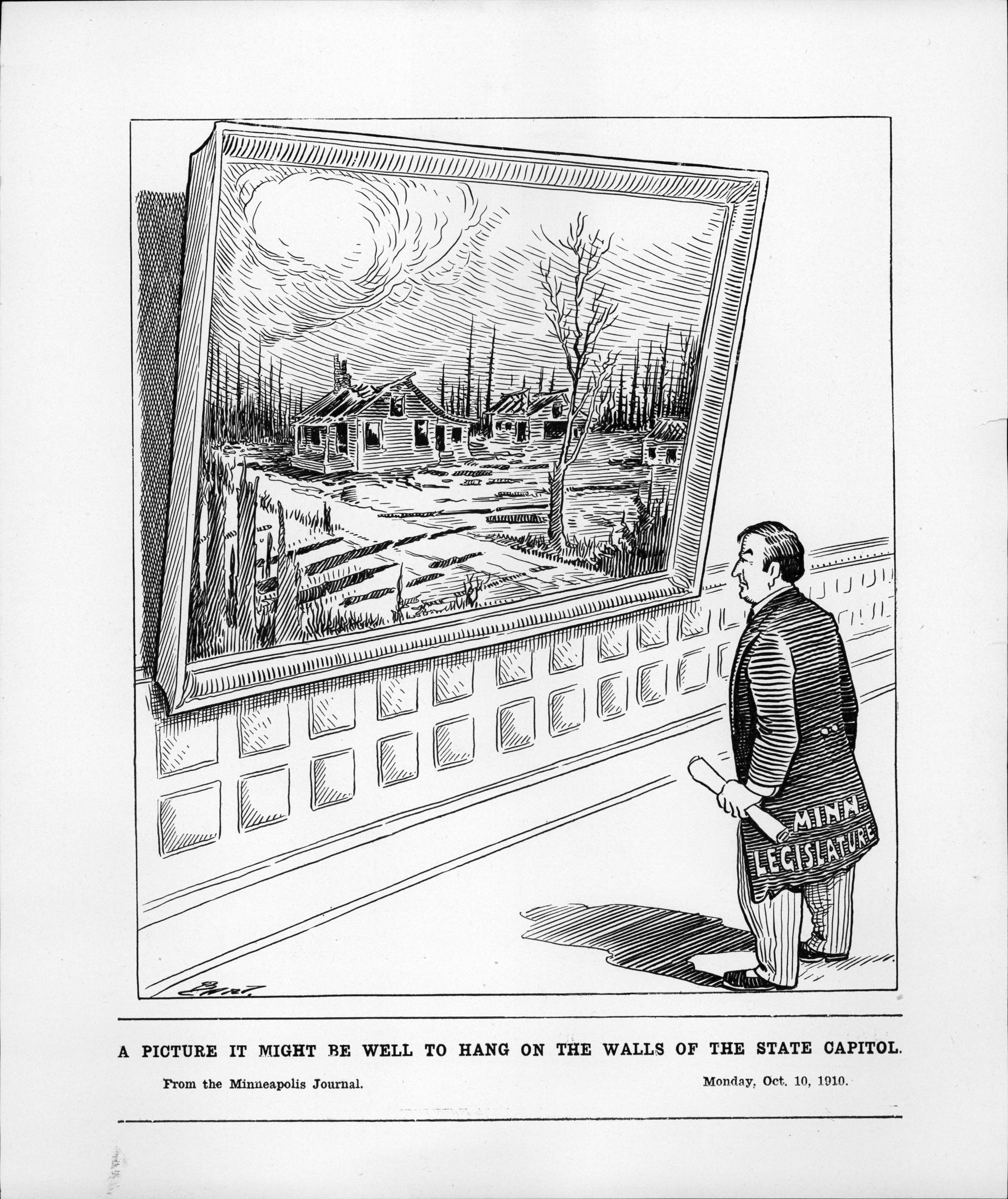
A Picture It Might Be Well To Hang On the Walls Of the State Capitol

The Baudette fire, also known as the Spooner–Baudette fire, was a large wildfire on October 7, 1910 that burned 1,200 to 1,450 square kilometres (300,000 to 360,000 acres) in Beltrami County (now in Lake of the Woods County), Minnesota, including nearly all of the twin towns of Spooner and Baudette. The fire also burned the villages of Graceton, Pitt, Williams, and Cedar Spur, Minnesota. Damage was horrific yet less so in the communities of Zipple, Roosevelt, Swift and Warroad in the U.S. and Stratton, Pinewood, Rainy River, and Sprague across the river in Canada, which also suffered losses. The Town of Rainy River lost its lumber mill, but saved many of the residents of Baudette and Spooner since the residential area was not affected. Their American friends were welcomed into homes where they remained for a very long time as their homes had to be rebuilt, creating a strong bond between the two communities.

== Region overview ==
Lake of the Woods County was known for its logging industry during the early 1900s. Similar to other forest fires, this disaster was sparked in dry, harvested timber land that was vulnerable to potential fire destruction. Homesteaders earned money by cutting and selling their wood to various buyers. The logging industry was the main employer in the area, as timber was big business. Several large sawmills had been established early at Rainy River, Baudette and Spooner on the bay of the Baudette River. Timber was floated down the tributaries of the Rainy River to the mills or hauled to the various railroad depots for shipment to markets via rail. When the logging industry was at its peak, a skilled person could walk across the logs filling the bay before being floated downstream.

Most of the land of new homesteads was still covered with timber. The limited number of cleared fields were small, generally cultivated to produce enough grain for animal feed and produce for household use. This large tract of forest, broken up with small fields and slash-filled cut-over areas, had conditions that supported development of a large conflagration.

== Firestorm ==
On October 7 a forest fire raged out of control across Lake of the Woods County, Minnesota, leveling everything in its path. The fire erupted out of the slash left behind from logging, sparked by trains or small brush fires. Fires were extreme because the weather conditions were extreme that year, especially nationwide. The region had suffered a severe drought for months which, combined with the available fuels and heavy winds, resulted in a massive blaze. Survivors believe that there were four main fires to start with, which grew, merged, and raced quickly toward the towns. Residents made no attempts to fight the fire, because it had developed so quickly and covered such a large area, catching people by surprise. The settlements burned down in less than two hours, including the railroad bridge over the bay that connected the two towns.

The aftermath of the fire was bleak: the streets were smoke-laden and wind-blown streets, the towns barren except for the piles of rubble from the burned buildings. The countryside was covered with ashes. By the end of the day the villages of Cedar Spur, Graceton, Pitt, Baudette and Spooner lay in ruins. Four hundred thousand acres were blackened. Homesteads across the county were destroyed and 43 lives were lost.

== Relief operations ==
Residents of Spooner and Baudette found refuge by riding trains across the Rainy River to the town of Rainy River, Ontario. Sources estimated the death toll between 29 and 42 people. Thousands were left homeless and winter was fast approaching. The American Red Cross assisted survivors; a tent city was built in a day to provide shelter, and many supplies were donated in order to rebuild. The Red Cross and the National Guard immediately began the rebuilding effort and many homesteaders now turned to the chore of land clearing with hopes for a crop in the spring. The lumber mills were either spared or undamaged; and so there was some reason for hopefulness for the future. The Baudette Fire was the third worst fire in the history of Minnesota measured by casualties, after the 1918 Cloquet Fire and the Great Hinckley Fire of 1894.

== Legacy ==
The total amount of land burned in the state of Minnesota in 1910 was estimated by Forestry Commissioner C. C. Andrews to be greater than 400,000 square hectometres (990,000 acres). The Baudette Fire, along with the Great Hinckley Fire, helped Andrews convince others that active management of forest practices was necessary to prevent such massive fires. For this reason, the 1910 Baudette Burn is considered one of the most significant wildfires in Minnesota history. As a direct result of this catastrophe, the legislature approved funds to establish the Minnesota Forestry Service (later the DNR), which was developed with a system of forest rangers and forestry districts to manage the lumber industry practices.

== Memorials ==
On October 13, 1910 a funeral service was held for 27 fire victims, who were buried in a mass grave at Elm Park Cemetery, Baudette. A marker for them was erected at the grave site. A historical marker commemorating the Baudette Fire is located on Minnesota State Highway 72 on the US side of the Baudette-Rainy River International Bridge.

== See also ==
- Peshtigo fire of 1871 in Wisconsin
- Great Hinckley Fire of 1894
- Great Fire of 1910 in Washington, Idaho, and Montana
- Cloquet fire of 1918
