= Williams, Minnesota =

City in Minnesota, United States

Williams
- City
- Location of Williams, Minnesota
- Coordinates: 48°46′7″N 94°57′16″W
- Country: United States
- State: Minnesota
- County: Lake of the Woods

Area
  - Total: 0.98 sq mi (2.53 km^{2})
  - Land: 0.98 sq mi (2.53 km^{2})
  - Water: 0 sq mi (0.00 km^{2})
- Elevation: 1,152 ft (351 m)

Population (2020)
  - Total: 157
  - Density: 161/sq mi (62.1/km^{2})
- Time zone: UTC-6 (Central (CST))
  - Summer (DST): UTC-5 (CDT)
- ZIP code: 56686
- Area code: 218
- FIPS code: 27-70402
- GNIS feature ID: 0654165

Williams is a city in Lake of the Woods County, Minnesota, United States. As of the 2020 census, Williams had a population of 157.

== History ==
Williams was incorporated in 1923. It developed with the Minnesota and Manitoba Railroad as a shipping center for timber products. It was named for William Mason and George Williams, who had followed the track roadbed in 1901 to stake claims at the site. Its post office began in 1903 with William H. Dure as postmaster.

Williams was burned in the Baudette Fire of 1910. It was rebuilt after.

== Geography ==
According to the United States Census Bureau, the city has a total area of 0.97 square miles (2.51 km^{2}), all land.

Williams is located along Minnesota State Highway 11 and County Road 2. Williams is a gateway to nearby Zippel Bay State Park on the South Shore of Lake of the Woods.

== Demographics ==
Historical population
Census	Pop.	Note	%±
1930	262		—
1940	376		43.5%
1950	414		10.1%
1960	317		−23.4%
1970	220		−30.6%
1980	217		−1.4%
1990	212		−2.3%
2000	210		−0.9%
2010	191		−9.0%
2020	157		−17.8%
U.S. Decennial Census

=== 2010 census ===
As of the census of 2010, there were 191 people, 86 households, and 46 families living in the city. The population density was 196.9 inhabitants per square mile (76.0/km^{2}). There were 110 housing units at an average density of 113.4 per square mile (43.8/km^{2}). The racial makeup of the city was 95.3% White, 1.0% African American, 0.5% Native American, 2.6% Asian, and 0.5% from other races. Hispanic or Latino of any race were 0.5% of the population.

There were 86 households, of which 27.9% had children under the age of 18 living with them, 33.7% were married couples living together, 11.6% had a female householder with no husband present, 8.1% had a male householder with no wife present, and 46.5% were non-families. 38.4% of all households were made up of individuals, and 16.3% had someone living alone who was 65 years of age or older. The average household size was 2.22 and the average family size was 2.93.

The median age in the city was 42.5 years. 27.7% of residents were under the age of 18; 6.8% were between the ages of 18 and 24; 19.4% were from 25 to 44; 27.8% were from 45 to 64; and 18.3% were 65 years of age or older. The gender makeup of the city was 50.3% male and 49.7% female.

=== 2000 census ===
As of the census of 2000, there were 210 people, 92 households, and 57 families living in the city. The population density was 214.6 inhabitants per square mile (82.9/km^{2}). There were 115 housing units at an average density of 117.5 per square mile (45.4/km^{2}). The racial makeup of the city was 97.62% White, 1.43% African American, and 0.95% from two or more races. Hispanic or Latino of any race were 1.90% of the population.

There were 92 households, out of which 26.1% had children under the age of 18 living with them, 40.2% were married couples living together, 14.1% had a female householder with no husband present, and 38.0% were non-families. 34.8% of all households were made up of individuals, and 15.2% had someone living alone who was 65 years of age or older. The average household size was 2.28 and the average family size was 2.89.

In the city, the population was spread out, with 26.7% under the age of 18, 8.1% from 18 to 24, 21.4% from 25 to 44, 21.4% from 45 to 64, and 22.4% who were 65 years of age or older. The median age was 40 years. For every 100 females, there were 92.7 males. For every 100 females age 18 and over, there were 94.9 males.

The median income for a household in the city was $26,364, and the median income for a family was $28,958. Males had a median income of $25,375 versus $24,063 for females. The per capita income for the city was $11,888. About 11.3% of families and 19.3% of the population were below the poverty line, including 27.3% of those under the age of eighteen and 20.0% of those 65 or over.

== Arts and Culture ==
=== Festival ===
The second weekend in July is "Back Home Days". During this week there are a lot of activities for returning residents, family and friends.

The annual Potato Day Festival takes place at Williams in October. The tradition began when potato farmers would gather and have a celebration that harvest was over. The festivities include a parade, dance, and the naming of the Potato Day Queen.

== Media ==
=== Television ===
Channel	Callsign	Affiliation	Branding	Subchannels		Owner
(Virtual)	Callsign	Affiliation	Branding	Channel	Programming	Owner
9.1	W32EG-D (KAWE Translator)	PBS	Lakeland PBS	9.2; 9.3; 9.4; 9.5; 9.6	First Nations Experience; PBS Kids; Create; PBS Encore; Minnesota Channel	Lake of the Woods County
34.1	K34MC-D	NBC	KVLY 11	34.1	CBS	Lake of the Woods County
36.1	K36LW-D	ABC	WDAZ	36.2	FOX	Lake of the Woods County
