= McDougald Township, Lake of the Woods County, Minnesota =

Township in Minnesota, United States

Coordinates: 48°45′19″N 94°53′17″W

McDougald Township, Minnesota
- Township
- Location of McDougald Township, within Lake of the Woods County, Minnesota
- Country: United States
- State: Minnesota
- County: Lake of the Woods

Area
  - Total: 35.27 sq mi (91.3 km^{2})
  - Land: 35.25 sq mi (91.3 km^{2})
  - Water: 0.02 sq mi (0.052 km^{2})

Population (2020)
  - Total: 207
  - Density: 5.87/sq mi (2.27/km^{2})
- Time zone: UTC-6 (Central (CST))
  - Summer (DST): UTC-5 (CDT)
- Area code: 218

McDougald Township is a township in Lake of the Woods County, Minnesota, United States. The population was 207 at the 2020 United States census.

== Geography ==
According to the United States Census Bureau, the township has a total area of 35.3 square miles (91.4 km^{2}), all land.

== Demographics ==
As of the census of 2000, there were 236 people, 90 households, and 69 families residing in the township. The population density was 6.7 people per square mile (2.6/km^{2}). There were 108 housing units at an average density of 3.1/sq mi (1.2/km^{2}). The racial makeup of the township was 96.19% White, 0.42% African American, 2.54% Native American and 0.85% Asian.

There were 90 households, out of which 34.4% had children under the age of 18 living with them, 68.9% were married couples living together, 3.3% had a female householder with no husband present, and 23.3% were non-families. 20.0% of all households were made up of individuals, and 8.9% had someone living alone who was 65 years of age or older. The average household size was 2.62 and the average family size was 3.04.

In the township the population was spread out, with 27.5% under the age of 18, 5.5% from 18 to 24, 28.8% from 25 to 44, 25.8% from 45 to 64, and 12.3% who were 65 years of age or older. The median age was 40 years. For every 100 females, there were 114.5 males. For every 100 females age 18 and over, there were 119.2 males.

The median income for a household in the township was $29,688, and the median income for a family was $36,719. Males had a median income of $29,922 versus $14,271 for females. The per capita income for the township was $13,468. None of the families and 3.3% of the population were living below the poverty line.
