= Lake of the Woods County, Minnesota =

County in Minnesota, United States

- County
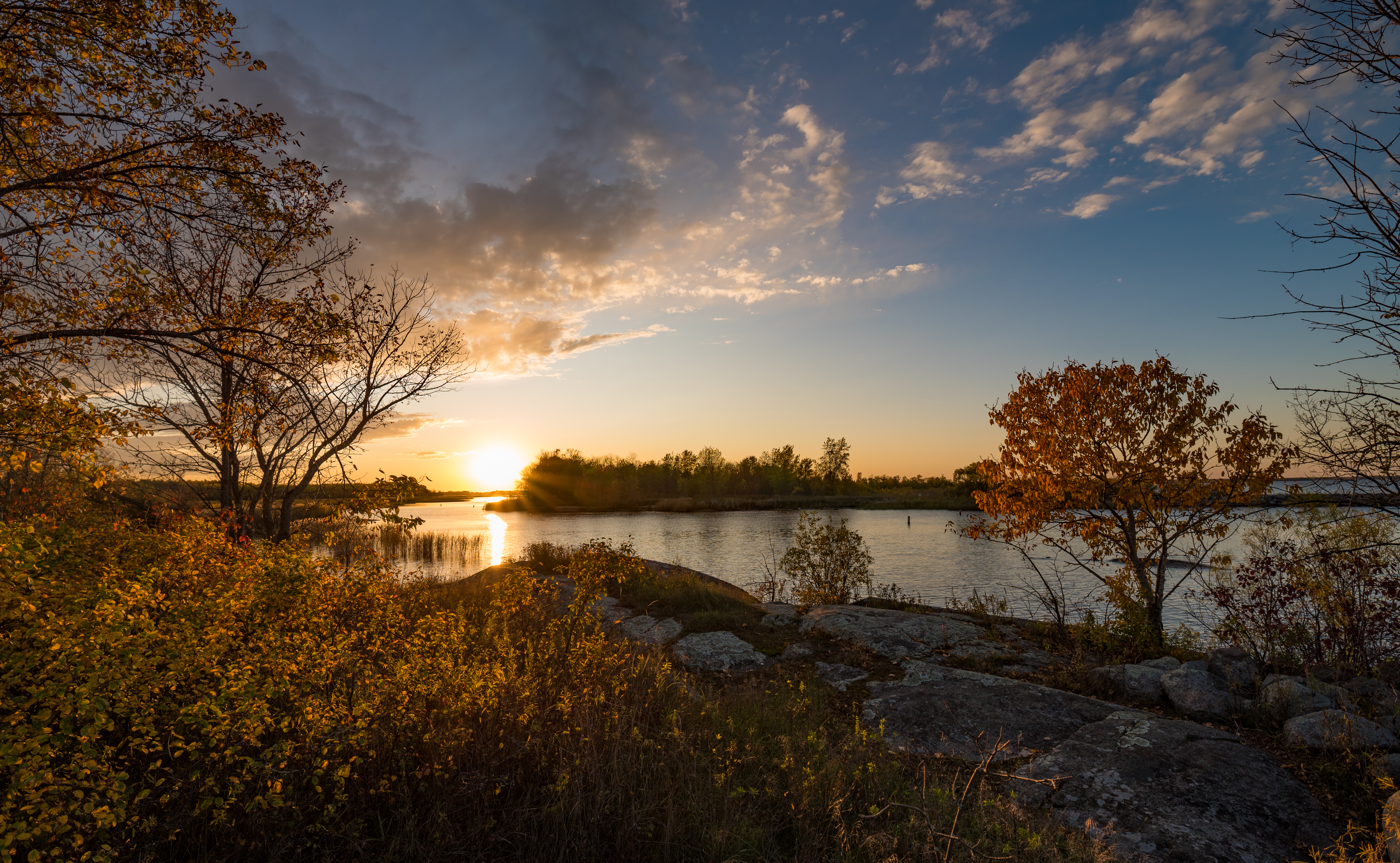
- Sunset over Zippel Bay State Park, Lake of the Woods

- Location within the U.S. state of Minnesota
- Coordinates: 48°46′N 94°54′W
- Country: United States
- State: Minnesota
- Founded: November 28, 1922 (created by vote); January 1, 1923 (organized)
- Named for: Lake of the Woods (lake)
- Seat: Baudette
- Largest city: Baudette

Area
  - Total: 1,775 sq mi (4,600 km^{2})
  - Land: 1,298 sq mi (3,360 km^{2})
  - Water: 477 sq mi (1,240 km^{2}) 27%

Population (2020)
  - Total: 3,763
  - Estimate (2025): 3,770 ▲
  - Density: 2.9/sq mi (1.1/km^{2})
- Time zone: UTC−6 (Central)
  - Summer (DST): UTC−5 (CDT)
- Congressional district: 8th
- Website: https://lotwcounty.gov/

Lake of the Woods County is the northernmost county of the U.S. state of Minnesota. As of the 2020 census, the population was 3,763, making it the state's second-least populous county. Its county seat is Baudette.

The county contains the Northwest Angle, the northernmost point of the Lower 48 States, and the U.S. portion of Lake of the Woods, shared with Canada. The county also includes the exclave of Elm Point. Since Alaska has no counties, Lake of the Woods is the northernmost county in the United States. It is also the only county in the United States with four words in its name, although there is a parish in Louisiana called St. John the Baptist Parish, and the United States Census Bureau treats parishes as county equivalents for census purposes.

== History ==
Lake of the Woods County was named for the lake that covers a large portion of it. Jacques de Noyon, a Frenchman who came from Trois Rivières, Quebec, explored the area in 1688 and was the first European to see the lake. He named it Lac aux Îles, "Lake of the Islands".

In 1885 the region got its first settler, Wilhelm Zippel, a German immigrant and fisherman. He settled on the lake's south shore in a place now called Zippel Bay. Shortly after, Alonzo Wheeler settled on the lake's southwest side at a place now called Wheeler's Point.

A wildfire, known as the Baudette fire of 1910, broke out in October of that year, burning 300,000 acres (1,200 km^{2}) and destroying the towns of Spooner, Baudette, Graceton, Pitt, Williams, and Cedar Spur.

Lake of the Woods County's government was organized on January 1, 1923, with Baudette as the county seat. It is Minnesota's newest county; county voters approved separating the northern townships of Beltrami County into a separate unit on November 28, 1922.

== Geography ==
Lake of the Woods County lies on Minnesota's border with Canada across the Rainy River, which flows northwest along the border to discharge into Lake of the Woods; its northwest border abuts Manitoba. The northern part of the county (the Northwest Angle) is separated from the rest of the county by the lake and thus has no land contact with the rest of the United States, making it an exclave. Land access to that part of the county is through Manitoba. Access by water or ice routes is possible. The Rapid River flows northeast through the southeastern part of the county to its discharge point into the Rainy River, near the county's northeast corner.

Lake of the Woods County's terrain consists of low rolling hills, partly wooded, devoted to agriculture. The terrain slopes to the east and north. Its highest point is a small protuberance one mile (1.6 km) west of Norris Camp, at 1,316 ft (401 m) ASL. The county has an area of 1,775 square miles (4,600 km^{2}), of which 1,298 square miles (3,360 km^{2}) is land and 477 square miles (1,240 km^{2}) (27%) is water.

=== Major highways ===
- Minnesota State Highway 11
- Minnesota State Highway 72
- Minnesota State Highway 172

=== Adjacent counties and districts ===
- Kenora District, Ontario - northeast
- Rainy River District, Ontario - northeast
- Koochiching County - southeast
- Beltrami County - south
- Roseau County - west
- Rural Municipality of Piney, Manitoba - west
- Buffalo Point, Manitoba - west

=== Protected areas ===
- Beltrami Island State Forest (part)
- Garden Island State Recreation Area
- Mulligan Lake Peatland Scientific and Natural Area
- Norris Camp Peatland Scientific and Natural Area
- Pine Island State Forest (part)
- Red Lake Peatland Scientific and Natural Area (part)
- Winter Road Lakes Peatland Scientific and Natural Area
- Zippel Bay State Park

=== Lakes ===
- Browns Lake
- Lake of the Woods
- Lost Lake
- Winter Road Lake

== Demographics ==
Historical population
Census	Pop.	Note	%±
1930	4,194		—
1940	5,975		42.5%
1950	4,955		−17.1%
1960	4,304		−13.1%
1970	3,987		−7.4%
1980	3,764		−5.6%
1990	4,076		8.3%
2000	4,522		10.9%
2010	4,045		−10.5%
2020	3,763		−7.0%
2025 (est.)	3,770	▲	0.2%
U.S. Decennial Census; 1790-1960 1900-1990; 1990-2000 2010-2020

=== Racial and ethnic composition ===
Lake of the Woods County, Minnesota – Racial and ethnic composition Note: the US Census treats Hispanic/Latino as an ethnic category. This table excludes Latinos from the racial categories and assigns them to a separate category. Hispanics/Latinos may be of any race.
Race / Ethnicity (NH = Non-Hispanic)	Pop 1980	Pop 1990	Pop 2000	Pop 2010	Pop 2020	% 1980	% 1990	% 2000	% 2010	% 2020
White alone (NH)	3,732	4,027	4,373	3,863	3,497	99.15%	98.80%	96.70%	95.50%	92.93%
Black or African American alone (NH)	2	1	12	13	12	0.05%	0.02%	0.27%	0.32%	0.32%
Native American or Alaska Native alone (NH)	9	13	51	27	19	0.24%	0.32%	1.13%	0.67%	0.50%
Asian alone (NH)	9	10	11	32	17	0.24%	0.25%	0.24%	0.79%	0.45%
Native Hawaiian or Pacific Islander alone (NH)	x	x	0	0	0	x	x	0.00%	0.00%	0.00%
Other race alone (NH)	5	0	1	2	13	0.13%	0.00%	0.02%	0.05%	0.35%
Mixed race or Multiracial (NH)	x	x	45	73	149	x	x	1.00%	1.80%	3.96%
Hispanic or Latino (any race)	7	25	29	35	56	0.19%	0.61%	0.64%	0.87%	1.49%
Total	3,764	4,076	4,522	4,045	3,763	100.00%	100.00%	100.00%	100.00%	100.00%

=== 2020 census ===
As of the 2020 census, the county had a population of 3,763. The median age was 50.6 years. 18.5% of residents were under the age of 18 and 26.5% of residents were 65 years of age or older. For every 100 females there were 112.6 males, and for every 100 females age 18 and over there were 114.0 males age 18 and over.

The racial makeup of the county was 93.3% White, 0.3% Black or African American, 0.5% American Indian and Alaska Native, 0.5% Asian, <0.1% Native Hawaiian and Pacific Islander, 0.4% from some other race, and 5.0% from two or more races. Hispanic or Latino residents of any race comprised 1.5% of the population.

<0.1% of residents lived in urban areas, while 100.0% lived in rural areas.

There were 1,745 households in the county, of which 21.7% had children under the age of 18 living in them. Of all households, 48.9% were married-couple households, 26.0% were households with a male householder and no spouse or partner present, and 18.1% were households with a female householder and no spouse or partner present. About 33.7% of all households were made up of individuals and 15.2% had someone living alone who was 65 years of age or older.

There were 3,391 housing units, of which 48.5% were vacant. Among occupied housing units, 82.8% were owner-occupied and 17.2% were renter-occupied. The homeowner vacancy rate was 2.0% and the rental vacancy rate was 17.7%.

=== 2000 census ===
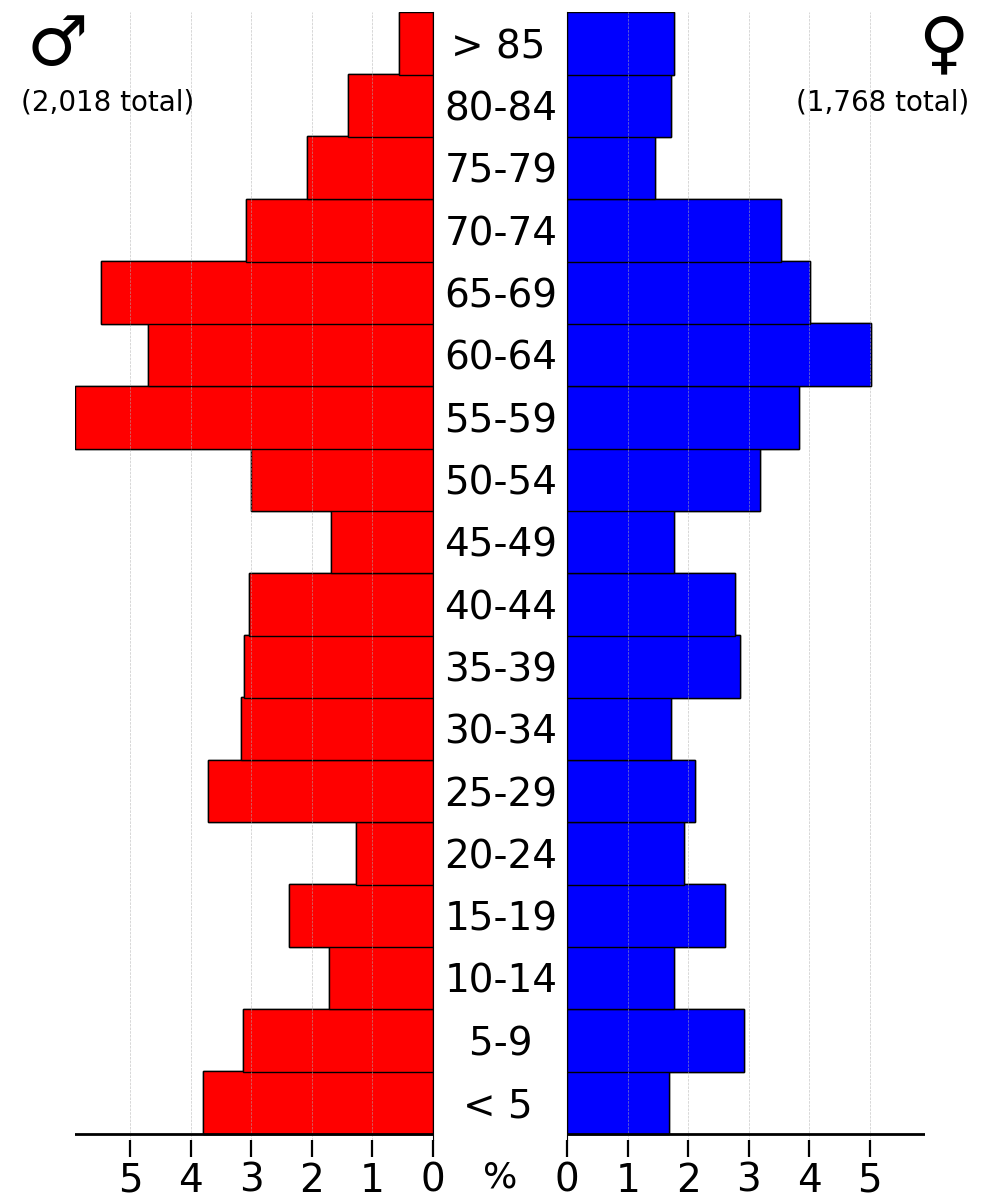
2022 US Census population pyramid for Lake of the Woods County, from ACS 5-year estimates

As of the census of 2000, there were 4,522 people, 1,903 households, and 1,267 families in the county. The population density was 3.48 per square mile (1.34/km^{2}). There were 3,238 housing units at an average density of 2.49 per square mile (0.96/km^{2}). The racial makeup of the county was 97.21% White/Caucasian, 0.29% Black/African American, 1.13% Native American, 0.24% Asian, 0.11% from other races, and 1.02% from two or more races. 0.64% of the population were Hispanic or Latino of any race. 26.2% were of Norwegian, 22.3% German, 8.9% Swedish, 5.8% American and 5.0% English ancestry.

There were 1,903 households, out of which 29.20% had children under the age of 18 living with them, 57.40% were married couples living together, 5.30% had a female householder with no husband present, and 33.40% were non-families. 29.70% of all households were made up of individuals, and 12.90% had someone living alone who was 65 years of age or older. The average household size was 2.35 and the average family size was 2.93.

The county population contained 24.70% under the age of 18, 5.70% from 18 to 24, 25.10% from 25 to 44, 27.20% from 45 to 64, and 17.20% who were 65 years of age or older. The median age was 42 years. For every 100 females there were 101.00 males. For every 100 females age 18 and over, there were 102.60 males.

The median income for a household in the county was $32,861, and the median income for a family was $38,936. Males had a median income of $30,469 versus $24,813 for females. The per capita income for the county was $16,976. About 6.70% of families and 9.80% of the population were below the poverty line, including 8.30% of those under age 18 and 10.60% of those age 65 or over.

== Communities ==
=== Cities ===
- Baudette (county seat)
- Roosevelt (partly in Roseau County)
- Williams

=== Census-designated place ===
- Angle Inlet

=== Unincorporated communities ===
- Arnesén
- Birch Beach
- Carp
- Clementson
- Faunce
- Graceton
- Hackett
- Long Point
- Lude
- Oak Island
- Penasse
- Pitt
- Sandy Shores
- Wheeler's Point

Townships of Lake of the Woods County

=== Townships ===
Although all the townships are named, as of 2001, there are no township governments. All the townships are officially part of unorganized territory.

- Angle Township
- Baudette Township
- Beaver Dam Township
- Boone Township
- Chilgren Township
- Cloverdale Township
- Eugene Township
- Forest Area Township
- Gudrid Township
- Hiwood Township
- Kiel Township
- Lakewood Township
- McDougald Township
- Meadowland Township
- Myhre Township
- Norris Township
- Noyes Township
- Park Township
- Pioneer Township
- Potamo Township
- Prosper Township
- Rapid River Township
- Rulien Township
- Spooner Township
- Swiftwater Township
- Township 157-30
- Township 158-30
- Victory Township
- Wabanica Township
- Walhalla Township
- Wheeler Township
- Zippel Township

== Government and politics ==
Lake of the Woods County favored Democrats in every election from 1932 to 1976, typically by large margins, with the exception of the 1972 landslide victory of Richard Nixon. Beginning in 1980, the county has voted Republican in every election except for 1992 and 1996, both wins by Bill Clinton, who won by less than 4% in the county and failed to obtain a majority of the vote both times thanks in part to the strong third-party performance of Ross Perot. With the exception of the landslide wins of Franklin D. Roosevelt in 1936 and Lyndon B. Johnson in 1964, no candidate of any party had won over 65% of the vote in Lake of the Woods County from its founding through 2012. That changed in 2016, when Donald Trump received over 68% of the county's vote, and he increased his vote share to over 70% in 2020 and earned nearly 73% of the vote in 2024, by far the three best performances by a Republican in the county's history.

United States presidential election results for Lake of the Woods County, Minnesota
Year	Republican		Democratic		Third party(ies)	
Year	No.	%	No.	%	No.	%
1924	703	42.71%	92	5.59%	851	51.70%
1928	781	51.79%	671	44.50%	56	3.71%
1932	369	23.55%	972	62.03%	226	14.42%
1936	385	18.76%	1,566	76.32%	101	4.92%
1940	850	33.62%	1,638	64.79%	40	1.58%
1944	642	35.45%	1,168	64.49%	1	0.06%
1948	583	29.08%	1,302	64.94%	120	5.99%
1952	898	44.30%	1,117	55.11%	12	0.59%
1956	723	40.69%	1,048	58.98%	6	0.34%
1960	835	43.86%	1,053	55.30%	16	0.84%
1964	489	27.71%	1,266	71.73%	10	0.57%
1968	607	38.96%	875	56.16%	76	4.88%
1972	877	55.44%	672	42.48%	33	2.09%
1976	757	38.52%	1,105	56.23%	103	5.24%
1980	1,052	52.60%	763	38.15%	185	9.25%
1984	1,094	56.39%	824	42.47%	22	1.13%
1988	984	54.24%	798	43.99%	32	1.76%
1992	762	34.67%	794	36.12%	642	29.21%
1996	814	40.48%	888	44.16%	309	15.37%
2000	1,216	55.60%	848	38.77%	123	5.62%
2004	1,428	59.50%	921	38.38%	51	2.13%
2008	1,278	55.25%	971	41.98%	64	2.77%
2012	1,306	58.46%	859	38.45%	69	3.09%
2016	1,540	68.69%	553	24.67%	149	6.65%
2020	1,704	70.76%	671	27.87%	33	1.37%
2024	1,710	72.86%	604	25.73%	33	1.41%

County Board of Commissioners
Position	Name	District	Next Election
Commissioner	James "Buck" Nordlof	District 1	2026
Commissioner	Cody Hasbargen	District 2	2024
Commissioner	Joe Grund	District 3	2026
Commissioner and Chairperson	Jon Waibel	District 4	2024
Commissioner	Edward Arnesen	District 5	2026

State Legislature (2023-2025)
Position	Name	Affiliation	District
Senate	Paul Utke	Republican	District 2
House of Representatives	Matt Grossell	Republican	District 2A
House of Representatives	Matt Bliss	Republican	District 2B

U.S Congress (2023-2025)
Position	Name	Affiliation	District
House of Representatives	Pete Stauber	Republican	8th
Senate	Amy Klobuchar	DFL	N/A
Senate	Tina Smith	DFL	N/A

== See also ==
- National Register of Historic Places listings in Lake of the Woods County, Minnesota
