= Battle of Cameron Dam =

Logging dispute in Wisconsin, U.S.

Battle of Cameron dam
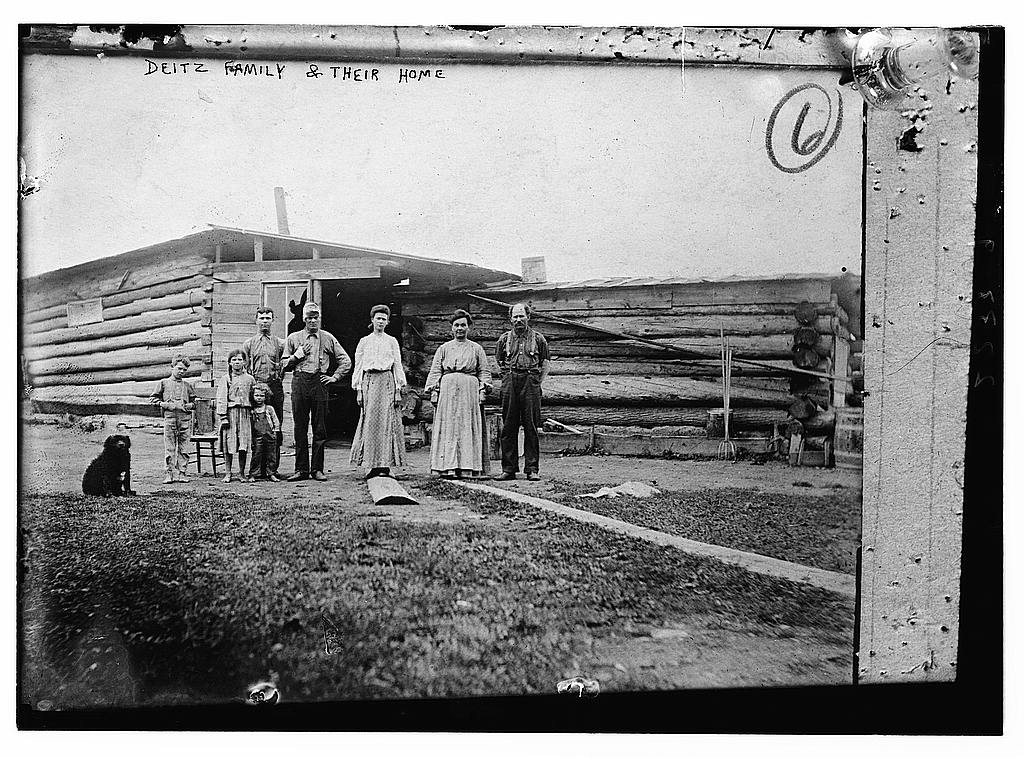
- Deitz family and their home in 1911
- Date: April 1904 – October 7th, 1910
- Location: Sawyer County, Wisconsin
- Caused by: Grievances over John Dietz's payment while working at Chippewa Lumber and Boom Company; Unaddressed flowage rights in the purchase of Dietz's property
- Result: Arrest of John F. Dietz and his family

Parties
John F. Dietz, his family and friends	Wisconsin law enforcement U.S. Marshals; McGuire & White Detective Agency; Citizens of Winter, Wisconsin

Lead figures
John F. Dietz (WIA)	James Gylland; Mike Madden; Fred Thorbahn

Number
6	9 (1906); 26–50 (1910)

Casualties and losses
4 wounded All arrested	1 killed 7 wounded

The Battle of Cameron Dam was a conflict lasting from 1904–1910 in Sawyer County, Wisconsin, where John F. Dietz had numerous confrontations with law enforcement over the rights of logging companies to pass logs through a dam that was partially on his property. The two most serious shootouts occurred in 1906 and 1910.

== History ==
He was born April 3, 1861, in Winneconne, Wisconsin. For six years, he maintained a log dam on the Thornapple River (Wisconsin). By the time the standoff ended he was a national hero. He was found guilty of murder and given a life sentence.

A historical marker near the site reads:

In 1904, John F. Deitz and his family purchased a farmstead on the Thornapple River about 2 miles south of here. Deitz soon discovered that Cameron Dam -- one of many logging dams on this important tributary of the Chippewa River -- lay on his property. He thereupon claimed that the Chippewa Lumber & Boom Co., a Weyerhaeuser affiliate, owed him a toll for logs driven downriver. For four years he refused to permit logs to be sluiced down the Thornapple, defending "his" dam at gunpoint and successfully resisting attempts to arrest him. At least one deputy and two of Deitz's children were wounded in confrontations. In becoming an outlaw, Deitz also became a folk hero with a nationwide following. In October 1910, a large sheriff's posse surrounded his house. In the ensuing gun battle, Oscar Harp, a deputy, was killed. John Deitz surrendered, stood trial for murder, and was sentenced to life imprisonment. He served 10 years, but public pressure eventually convinced Gov. John J. Blain to pardon him in May 1921. Deitz died in 1924. Cameron Dam has long since disappeared.

== See also ==
"'Defender of Cameron Dam' was icon for the underdog" article by Dennis McCann.
