= Prosper Township, Lake of the Woods County, Minnesota =

Township in Minnesota, United States

Coordinates: 48°54′30″N 94°56′05″W

Prosper Township, Minnesota
- Township
- Location of Prosper Township, within Lake of the Woods County, Minnesota
- Country: United States
- State: Minnesota
- County: Lake of the Woods

Area
  - Total: 12.55 sq mi (32.5 km^{2})
  - Land: 12.54 sq mi (32.5 km^{2})
  - Water: 0.002 sq mi (0.0052 km^{2})

Population (2020)
  - Total: 122
  - Density: 9.73/sq mi (3.76/km^{2})
- Time zone: UTC-6 (Central (CST))
  - Summer (DST): UTC-5 (CDT)
- Area code: 218

Prosper Township is a township in Lake of the Woods County, Minnesota, United States. The population was 122 at the 2020 United States census.

== Geography ==
According to the United States Census Bureau, the township has a total area of 12.5 square miles (32.5 km^{2}), all land.

== Demographics ==
As of the census of 2000, there were 155 people, 72 households, and 49 families residing in the township. The population density was 12.4 people per square mile (4.8/km^{2}). There were 211 housing units at an average density of 16.8/sq mi (6.5/km^{2}). The racial makeup of the township was 99.35% White, and 0.65% from two or more races. Hispanic or Latino of any race were 1.29% of the population.

There were 72 households, out of which 15.3% had children under the age of 18 living with them, 66.7% were married couples living together, 1.4% had a female householder with no husband present, and 30.6% were non-families. 27.8% of all households were made up of individuals, and 11.1% had someone living alone who was 65 years of age or older. The average household size was 2.15 and the average family size was 2.60.

In the township the population was spread out, with 15.5% under the age of 18, 2.6% from 18 to 24, 18.7% from 25 to 44, 39.4% from 45 to 64, and 23.9% who were 65 years of age or older. The median age was 54 years. For every 100 females, there were 89.0 males. For every 100 females age 18 and over, there were 92.6 males.

The median income for a household in the township was $62,625, and the median income for a family was $63,250. Males had a median income of $100,000 versus $0 for females. The per capita income for the township was $34,557. About 26.5% of families and 27.6% of the population were below the poverty line, including none of those under the age of 18 or 65 or over.
