= Beaver Mills Lumber Company =

Sawmill in Ontario, Canada

The Beaver Mills Lumber Company
- Trade name: Beaver Mills
- Industry: Lumber
- Founded: 1895
- Founder: Unknown
- Defunct: October 7, 1910
- Successor: Rat Portage Lumber Company
- Headquarters: Rainy River; Rail links: Ontario and Rainy River Railway, Canadian Northern Railway
- Services: Shipping company

The Beaver Mills Lumber Company was a sawmill established in 1895 on the Rainy River in Northwestern Ontario, near the international border with Baudette, Minnesota. In 1910, as the Rat Portage Lumber Company, it was destroyed in the Baudette Fire.

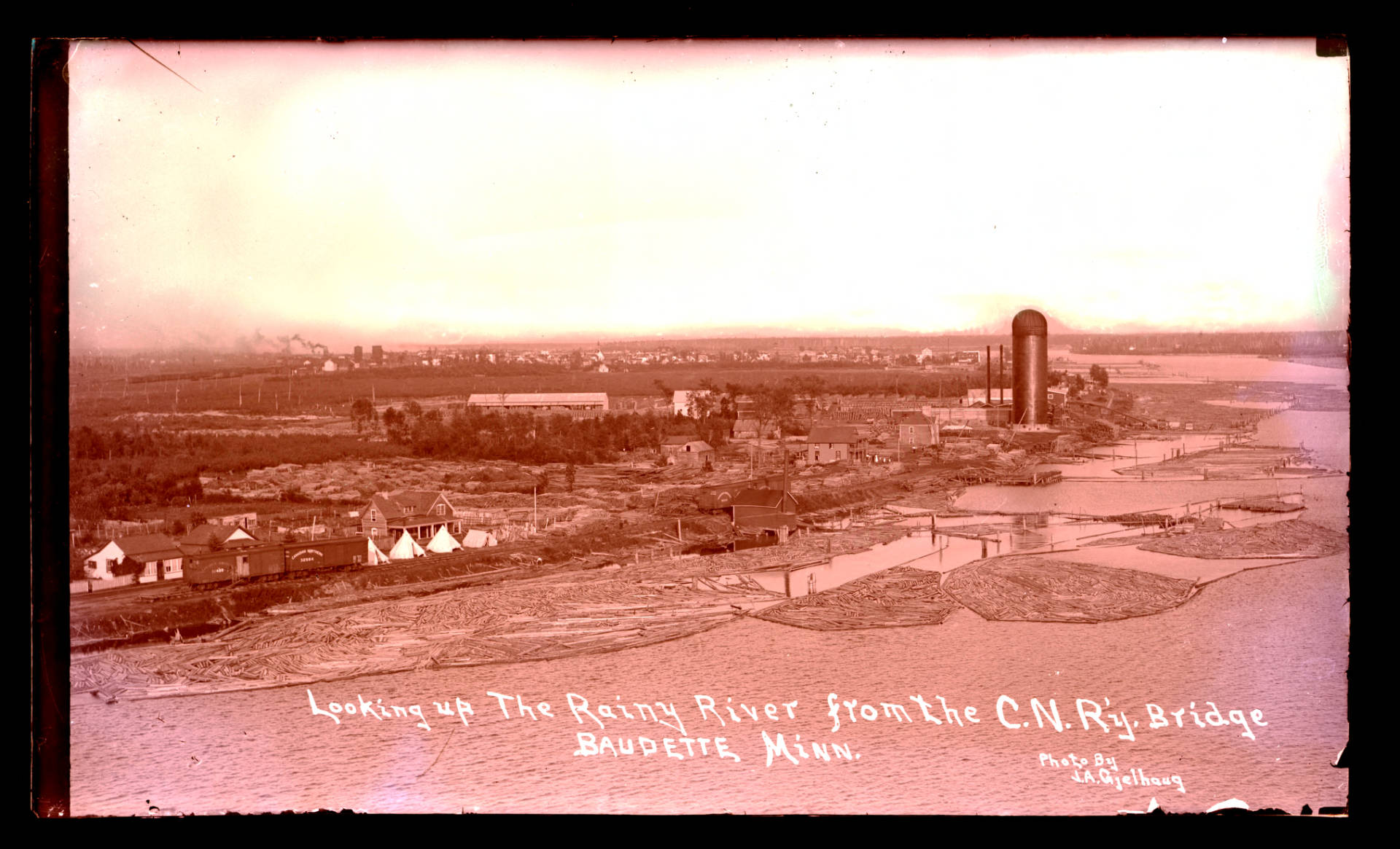
A picture of the big mill in Rainy River from the CNR railway bridge

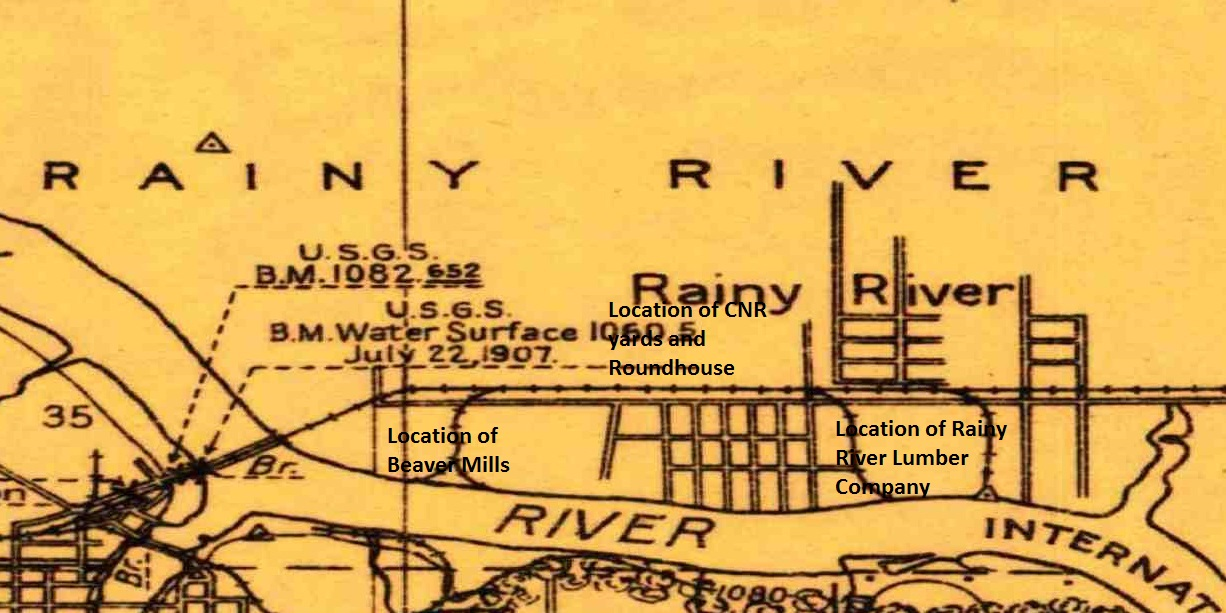
Map of the locations of the industry

== Early years ==
In 1895 a party of Bemidji lumberman moved a small sawmill overland to the headwaters of Rapid River, downstream from Rainy River, then down the Rainy River by raft until a point where the Ontario and Rainy River Railway had plans to build a railway bridge. The mill started its operation with one circular saw and later grew to be one of the largest mills in the world. In 1898, The Beaver Mills Lumber Company, owned by J.H. Hughes and Long, bought the mill. The mill hands and their families built shacks around the mill and the shack town became known as Beaver Mills.

By 1900, McKenzie, Mann & Co. had construction work on the steel railway bridge well underway. Much of the material for the bridge was brought during the winter and piled on the ice, after the spring breakup, barges were used, one of the barges, carrying railway ties, sunk at the intersection of the river and Miller's Creek, it still lies at the bottom of the river.

The bridge was completed in 1901 and in the same year the Rat Portage Lumber Company bought the Beaver Mills Lumber Company mill and timber interests. The new owner installed bigger and better machinery, including a single cutting band saw, one gang saw, a pair of twin circulars and a planer.

The mill's capacity soon grew to 200,000 board feet a day, with 200 men being employed in the saw mill during the summer and another thirty or so in the planing mill year round.

The Beaver Mills Port Office was located just east of the mill.

== Destruction ==
On the evening of Friday, October 7, 1910, a roaring cyclone of flame tore into the Minnesota lumbering towns of Baudette and Spooner that consumed everything in its path. By 7 p.m. people were beginning to gather at the train depot and a message was wired to Rainy River to have relief trains ready if necessary. Half an hour later, watchers perched on top of a building opposite the depot cried, "It's coming. Quick, give the fire alarm."

The whistle sounded and the people came. The sick in night clothing, children carried dolls or pets and adults, a cherished possession or two. There was some panic when only one coach arrived. Oil tanks lay not far from the depot. Then again, the track was on fire and burning embers had reached the Canadian side.

Soon another train of boxcars arrived from Rainy River and took many to safety. Others elected to stay in Baudette and sought shelter in boats on the storm lashed waves of the river.

At the last possible minute the town of Rainy River was saved by a change in the wind. The Rat Portage Lumber Company was destroyed and all that remains of the pine reserves in the area is the local park called "The Pines".
