= Wheeler's Point, Minnesota =

- Unincorporated community
- Location within Minnesota Location within the United States
- Coordinates: 48.837761°N 94.697709°W
- Country: United States
- State: Minnesota
- County: Lake of the Woods
- Township: Wheeler
- Elevation: 1,070 ft (330 m)
- Time zone: UTC-6 (Central (CST))
  - Summer (DST): UTC-5 (CDT)
- Area code: 218
- GNIS feature ID: 654059

Wheeler's Point is an unincorporated community in Wheeler Township, Lake of the Woods County, Minnesota, United States. It is 12 miles north of Baudette.

County Road 8 and Minnesota State Highway 172 are two of the main routes in the community.

Wheeler's Point is located at the Four Mile Bay at the southern end of the Lake of the Woods. The entry to the Rainy River is also at this point.

The community of Hackett and Zippel Bay State Park are also nearby.

== History ==
In 1885, its first settler, Alonzo Wheeler settled in the area of the current village. By the 1890s more people started to follow Wheeler's steps and also settled in the area.

Wheeler's Point had its economic and importance peak by the 1920s when the entire lake of the woods county's tourist industry boom led to the creation of various resorts in the area. The Kilmek family, seeing an opportunity, opened the very first resort in Wheeler's point.
