= Minnesota State Highway 172 =

State highway in Minnesota, United States

Trunk Highway 172
- MN 172 highlighted in red

Route information
- Maintained by MnDOT
- Length: 11.515 mi (18.532 km)
- Existed: 1963–present

Major junctions
- South end: MN 11 at Baudette
- CR 8 near Wheeler's Point
- North end: Wheeler's Point at the Lake of the Woods

Location
- Country: United States
- State: Minnesota
- Counties: Lake of the Woods

Highway system
- Minnesota Trunk Highway System; Interstate; US; State; Legislative; Scenic
← MN 171	→ MN 175

Minnesota State Highway 172 (MN 172) is a 11.515-mile-long (18.532 km) highway in far northern Minnesota, which runs from its intersection with State Highway 11 at Baudette and continues north to its northern terminus in Wheeler's Point at the Lake of the Woods.

The route passes through the community of Hackett.

Highway 172 generally follows the Rainy River from Baudette to the Lake of the Woods.

== Route description ==
State Highway 172 serves as a north–south route between Baudette, Hackett, Wheeler's Point, and the Lake of the Woods.

Zippel Bay State Park is located 6 miles west of the Wheeler's Point junction of Highway 172 and County Road 8. The park entrance is located on County Road 8.

The route is legally defined as Route 140 in the Minnesota Statutes. It is not marked with this number.

== History ==
Highway 172 was authorized in 1933 and was originally numbered 72 as the north end of State Highway 72 between 1934 and 1963.

In 1963, the short connection to the Canadian border crossing at Baudette (now designated as part of Highway 72) was added to the highway system. The former northern section of Highway 72 between State Highway 11 (at Baudette) and Wheeler's Point (at Lake of the Woods) was then renumbered 172 at this time.

172 was paved (as 72) by 1940 between Highway 11 at Baudette and County Road 6. The section of 172 (as 72) between County Road 6 and Wheeler's Point was paved by 1953.

Highway 172 was numbered as an extension of Highway 72.

== Major intersections ==
The entire route is in Lake of the Woods County.

Location	mi	km	Destinations	Notes
Baudette	0.000	0.000	MN 11 – Warroad, Roseau, Baudette	
Baudette Township	2.688	4.326	CR 39	
Baudette Township	5.710	9.189	CR 30	
Wabanica Township	6.900	11.104	CR 6	
Wabanica Township	8.549	13.758	CR 31	
Wheeler Township	9.543	15.358	CR 32	
Wheeler Township	10.610	17.075	CR 8 west, CR 33 east	
Wheeler Township	11.260	18.121	CR 33	
Wheeler's Point	11.534	18.562	Wheeler's Point Resort	
1.000 mi = 1.609 km; 1.000 km = 0.621 mi
