= Baudette River =

River in Minnesota, United States

Coordinates: 48.7166404°N 94.5924293°W

The Baudette River is a short tributary of the Rainy River in northern Minnesota in the United States. Via the Rainy River, Lake of the Woods, the Winnipeg River, Lake Winnipeg and the Nelson River, it is part of the Hudson Bay watershed. It drains a flat region which was a prehistoric lake bed of glacial Lake Agassiz.

The river flows for its entire length in eastern Lake of the Woods County. It flows generally north-northeastwardly and joins the Rainy River at the town of Baudette, opposite the town of Rainy River, Ontario.

== See also ==
- List of Minnesota rivers
