= Hackett, Minnesota =

- Unincorporated community
- Location within Minnesota Location within the United States
- Coordinates: 48°48′57″N 94°43′07″W
- Country: United States
- State: Minnesota
- County: Lake of the Woods
- Township: Wheeler
- Elevation: 1,076 ft (328 m)
- Time zone: UTC-6 (Central (CST))
  - Summer (DST): UTC-5 (CDT)
- Area code: 218
- GNIS feature ID: 654738

Hackett is an unincorporated community in Wheeler Township, Lake of the Woods County, Minnesota, United States. It lies 10 miles north of Baudette.

County Road 32, County Road 70, and State Highway 172 are three of the main routes in the community.

A post office operated from 1905 to 1923; John L. Hackett was postmaster.
