= BDE =

BDE may refer to:

== Chemistry ==
- Bond-dissociation energy, the dissociation energy of a chemical bond
- Brominated diaryl (or diphenyl) ethers, see Polybrominated diphenyl ethers

== Technology ==
- BitLocker Drive Encryption, a full disk encryption feature included with Microsoft Windows
- Borland Database Engine, a database engine by Borland

== Other ==
- Baudette International Airport (IATA code), airport in Baudette, Minnesota
- Bde, an abbreviation for the military unit brigade
- BDE, the station code for Bairnsdale railway station, Victoria, Australia
- BDE (wrestler) (born 1999), ring name used by Brandon Collymore
- Big dick energy, a modern slang phrase

== See also ==
- BDEs (disambiguation)
