= Baudette–Rainy River International Bridge =

Baudette – Rainy River International Bridge
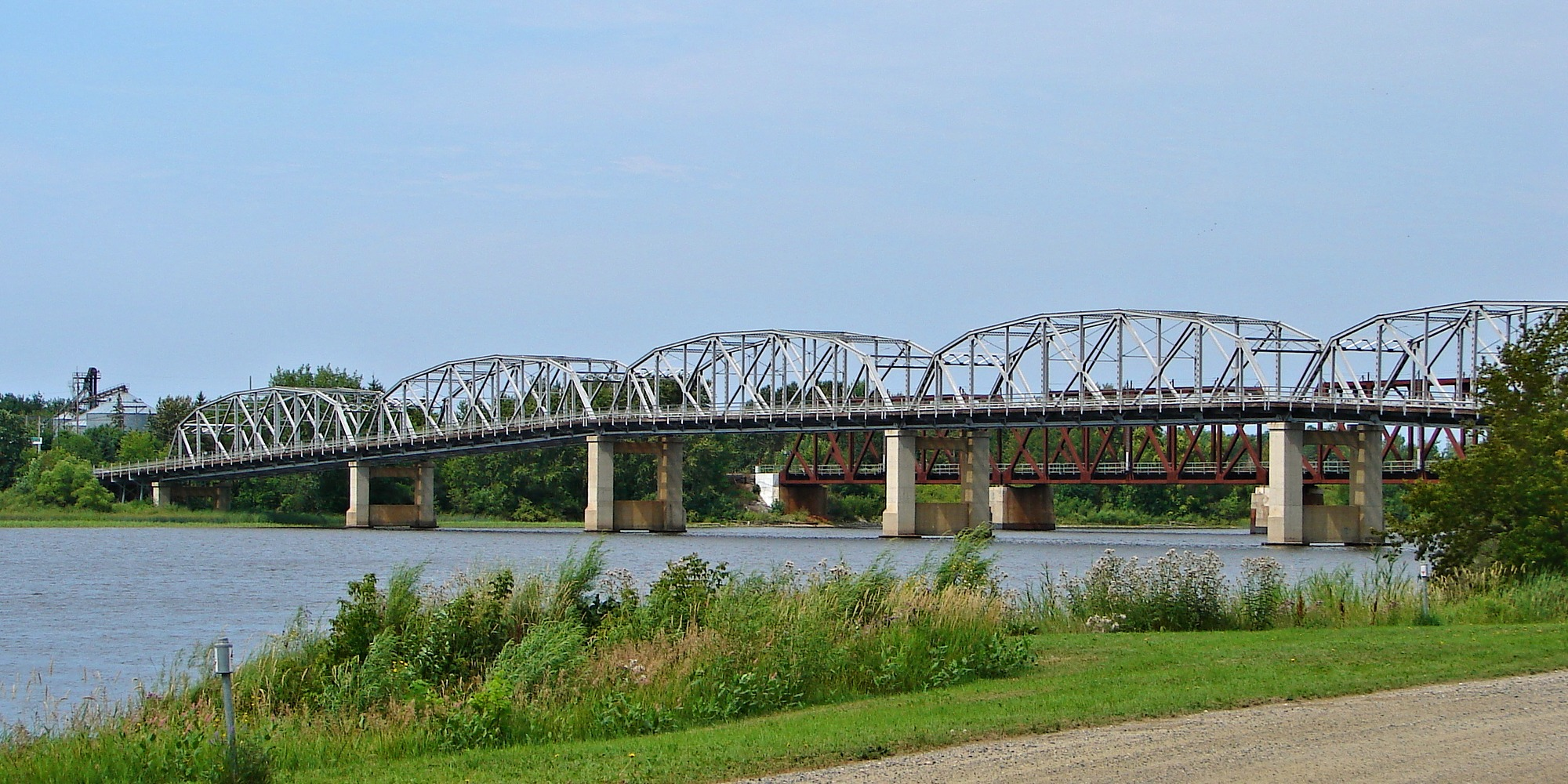
- International Bridge seen from the Canadian side
- Coordinates: 48°43′09″N 94°35′25″W
- Carries: 2 lanes of MN 72 and Highway 11, pedestrian traffic
- Crosses: Rainy River
- Locale: Rainy River, Ontario
- Owner: Ontario and Minnesota

Characteristics
- Design: steel truss
- Material: Steel
- Total length: 391 metres (1,283 ft)
- Width: 7.3 metres (24 ft)
- No. of spans: 6
- Clearance above: 4.5 metres (15 ft) (above road deck)
- Clearance below: Rainy River

History
- Constructed by: Barnett-McQueen Ltd
- Construction start: 1958
- Construction end: 1960
- Opened: July 30, 1960

Statistics
- Toll: 1960-1988

Location
- Interactive map of Baudette – Rainy River International Bridge

The Baudette – Rainy River International Bridge is an international bridge connecting Rainy River, Ontario, Canada, with Baudette, Minnesota, United States, across the Rainy River.

The bridge marks the western terminus of Ontario Highway 11 (as Atwood Avenue) and the northern terminus of Minnesota State Highway 72 (International Drive). The bridge is jointly owned by Ontario and Minnesota, and is managed by MTO (with funding from the Government of Canada) and MnDOT, respectively. The bridge carries 2 lanes of traffic and a 1.8 metres (5.9 ft) sidewalk for pedestrian traffic. Customs plazas are located on both sides of the bridge.

Downriver from the bridge is Baudette-Rainy River Rail Bridge, built in 1901 for Ontario and Rainy River Railway and now used by CN Rail.

== Replacement ==
A new replacement bridge was completed and opened to traffic in October 2020. Destruction of the old structure was expected to be complete by fall 2021. A virtual celebration of the bridge's completion took place on 28 October, 2020.

== Border crossing ==
The Baudette–Rainy River Border Crossing connects the cities of Baudette, Minnesota and Rainy River, Ontario across the bridge. The Port of Entry was established in 1960 when the International Bridge was completed. Prior to 1960, the cities were connected via point-to-point ferry service as well as a railroad bridge. It is the westernmost border crossing in Ontario, and the westernmost border crossing between Canada and the United States that is located at a bridge.

Both the US and Canada border stations are open 24 hours per day. The Canada border station at Rainy River was rebuilt in 1991, and features a tall canopy that accommodates larger trucks than those that can fit beneath the bridge structure (14' 8"). The height limitations restrict the size of the trucks than can cross the border at this location.

The US border station at Baudette was rebuilt in 1997.

== See also ==
- List of international bridges in North America
- List of Canada–United States border crossings
