= KBDE =

KBDE may refer to:

- KBDE (FM), a radio station (89.9 FM) licensed to Temple, Texas, United States
- the ICAO code for Baudette International Airport
