= KRWB =

KRWB may refer to:

- KRWB-TV, a television station (channel 21) licensed to Roswell, New Mexico, United States, repeating KWBQ
- KRWB (AM), a radio station (1410 AM) licensed to Roseau, Minnesota, United States
