= Hayes Lake State Park =

State park in Minnesota, United States

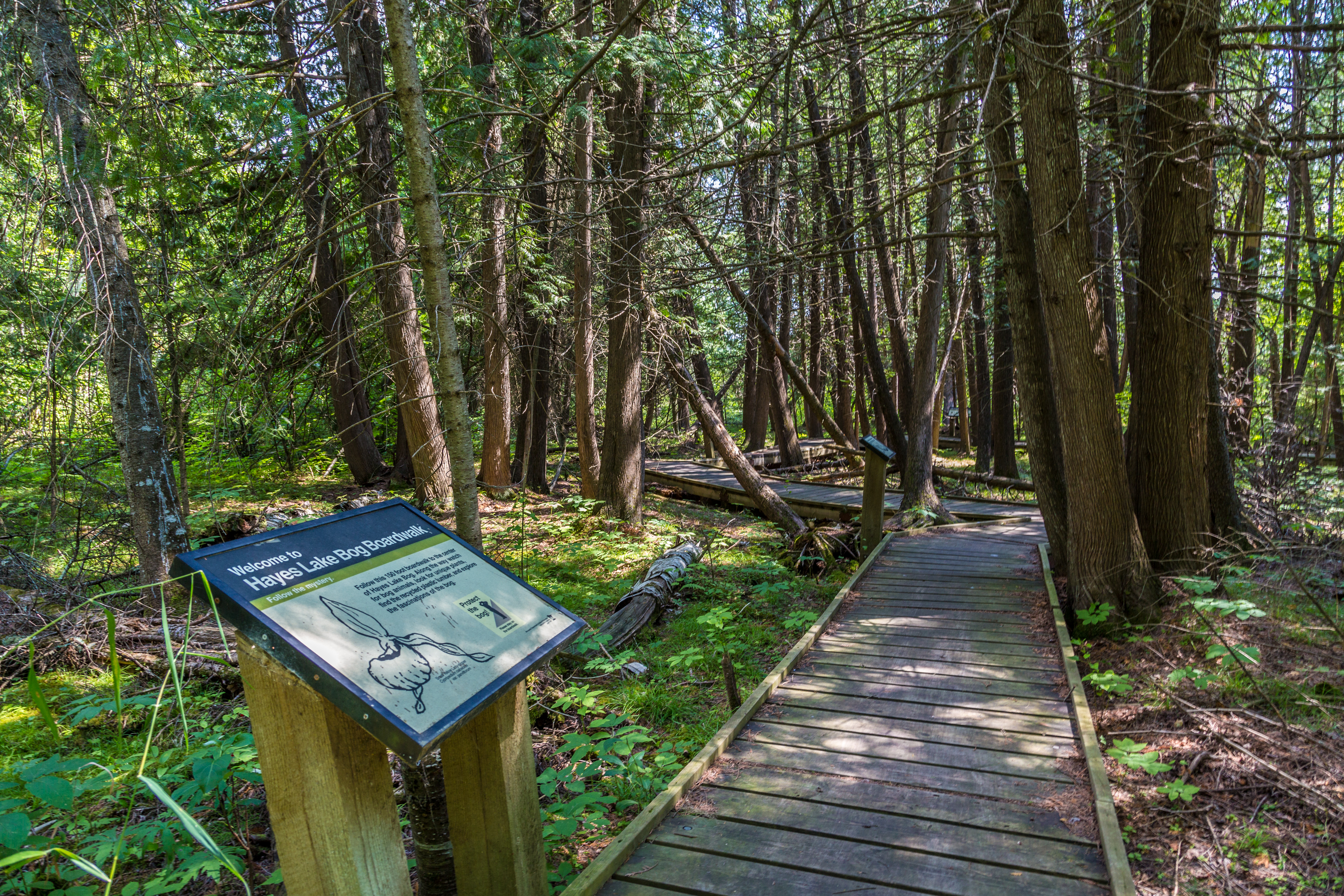
- An interpretive sign along the Bog Boardwalk at Hayes Lake State Park in Minnesota.

- Location within Minnesota Location within the United States
- Location: Roseau, Minnesota, United States
- Nearest town: Wannaska
- Coordinates: 48°37′23″N 95°30′27″W
- Area: 2,958 acres (11.97 km^{2})
- Elevation: 1,201 ft (366 m)
- Established: 1973
- Designated: 1967
- Governing body: Minnesota Department of Natural Resources

Hayes Lake State Park is a state park in northwestern Minnesota, United States, near the city of Roseau. The state park was established in 1967 and dedicated in 1973. The park is named after A.H. Hayes, a local and proponent of the park.

== Recreation ==
The park provides walking and biking trails, and shares horseback riding, skiing, and snowmobile trails with nearby Beltrami Island State Forest.

== Wildlife ==
Black bears are residents of the northern forest and are seen by visitors occasionally in this park. Other mammalian species that roam in and around this park are moose, fisher, porcupine, bobcat, river otter, raccoon, deer, beaver, red fox, marten, Canadian lynx, mink, and timber wolf. Loons, herons, grebes, and other water birds can be observed by bird watchers along the shoreline.
