= BDes =

BDes and BDES may stand for:

- Bachelor of Design, an academic degree
- Bachelor's Degree Examination for Self-Education, an alternative to getting a bachelor's degree

== See also ==
- BDE (disambiguation)
