= Roseau, Minnesota =

City in Minnesota, United States

Roseau
- City
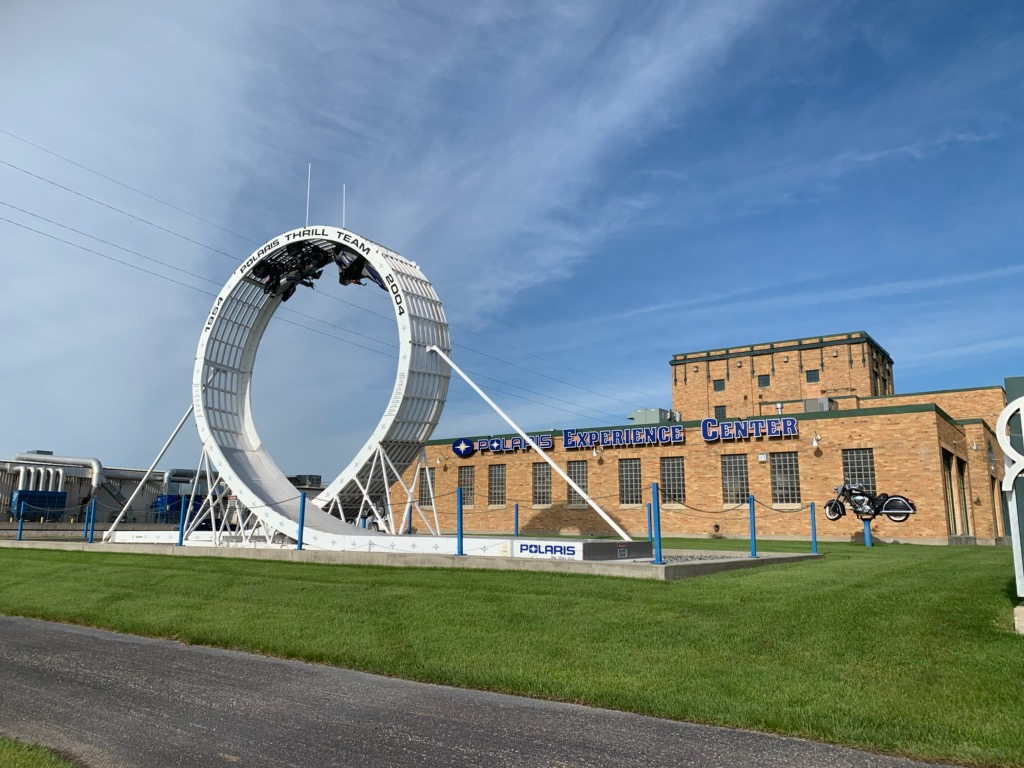
- Polaris Experience Center
- Motto: "Feels Like Home"
- Location within Roseau County and Minnesota

- Location within the United States
- Coordinates: 48°50′48″N 95°45′39″W
- Country: United States
- State: Minnesota
- County: Roseau
- Established: 1895

Government
  - Mayor: Dan Fabian
  - Sheriff: Steve Gust

Area
  - Total: 2.67 sq mi (6.92 km^{2})
  - Land: 2.67 sq mi (6.92 km^{2})
  - Water: 0 sq mi (0.00 km^{2})
- Elevation: 1,047 ft (319 m)

Population (2020)
  - Total: 2,744
  - Estimate (2021): 2,730
  - Density: 1,026.5/sq mi (396.34/km^{2})
- Time zone: UTC-6 (CST)
  - Summer (DST): UTC-5 (CDT)
- ZIP code: 56751
- Area code: 218
- FIPS code: 27-55546
- GNIS feature ID: 0650278
- Website: city.roseau.mn.us

Roseau (/roʊˈzoʊ/ roh-ZOH) is a city in and the county seat of Roseau County, Minnesota, United States. Its population was 2,744 at the 2020 census.

== History ==
Prior to the arrival of European Settlers, the land that is now Roseau Minnesota was occupied by the Ojibwe people, who were known to farm the wild rice surrounding the Roseau River.

A post office called Roseau has been in operation since 1895. The city took its name from the nearby Roseau River.

The Webster Hotel was purchased in January 1898, the building then became the first courthouse in the region.

== Geography ==
According to the United States Census Bureau, the city has a total area of 2.67 square miles (6.92 km^{2}), all land.

Hayes Lake State Park is nearby.

=== Climate ===
Roseau has a humid continental climate (Köppen climate classification Dfb) with warm summers and severely cold winters. Precipitation is significantly higher in summer than at other times of the year.

On October 26, 1936, the temperature in Roseau dropped to –16 °F (–26.7 °C), which is Minnesota’s coldest recorded temperature in October.

Climate data for Roseau, Minnesota, 2006–2020 normals, extremes 2003–present
Month	Jan	Feb	Mar	Apr	May	Jun	Jul	Aug	Sep	Oct	Nov	Dec	Year
Record high °F (°C)	57 (14)	55 (13)	81 (27)	92 (33)	101 (38)	102 (39)	107 (42)	101 (38)	98 (37)	88 (31)	73 (23)	52 (11)	107 (42)
Mean maximum °F (°C)	38.4 (3.6)	37.1 (2.8)	54.6 (12.6)	70.3 (21.3)	83.5 (28.6)	87.0 (30.6)	89.1 (31.7)	89.5 (31.9)	85.4 (29.7)	74.1 (23.4)	57.0 (13.9)	37.2 (2.9)	92.0 (33.3)
Mean daily maximum °F (°C)	15.9 (−8.9)	18.0 (−7.8)	35.1 (1.7)	50.1 (10.1)	64.4 (18.0)	73.9 (23.3)	79.5 (26.4)	77.1 (25.1)	67.8 (19.9)	51.6 (10.9)	35.4 (1.9)	18.7 (−7.4)	49.0 (9.4)
Daily mean °F (°C)	6.4 (−14.2)	7.4 (−13.7)	24.7 (−4.1)	39.4 (4.1)	52.9 (11.6)	63.2 (17.3)	68.1 (20.1)	65.3 (18.5)	56.8 (13.8)	42.5 (5.8)	27.5 (−2.5)	10.7 (−11.8)	38.7 (3.7)
Mean daily minimum °F (°C)	−2.7 (−19.3)	−3.2 (−19.6)	14.3 (−9.8)	28.6 (−1.9)	41.3 (5.2)	52.5 (11.4)	56.6 (13.7)	53.5 (11.9)	45.7 (7.6)	33.7 (0.9)	19.6 (−6.9)	2.9 (−16.2)	28.6 (−1.9)
Mean minimum °F (°C)	−29.8 (−34.3)	−26.9 (−32.7)	−14.7 (−25.9)	12.1 (−11.1)	26.2 (−3.2)	39.2 (4.0)	45.7 (7.6)	40.6 (4.8)	30.5 (−0.8)	18.9 (−7.3)	−2.5 (−19.2)	−21.6 (−29.8)	−32.0 (−35.6)
Record low °F (°C)	−49 (−45)	−52 (−47)	−44 (−42)	−18 (−28)	11 (−12)	18 (−8)	31 (−1)	23 (−5)	12 (−11)	−16 (−27)	−36 (−38)	−45 (−43)	−52 (−47)
Source: National Weather Service

== Demographics ==
Historical population
Census	Pop.	Note	%±
1900	301		—
1910	644		114.0%
1920	1,012		57.1%
1930	1,028		1.6%
1940	1,775		72.7%
1950	2,231		25.7%
1960	2,146		−3.8%
1970	2,552		18.9%
1980	2,272		−11.0%
1990	2,396		5.5%
2000	2,756		15.0%
2010	2,633		−4.5%
2020	2,744		4.2%
2021 (est.)	2,730		−0.5%
U.S. Decennial Census; 2020 Census

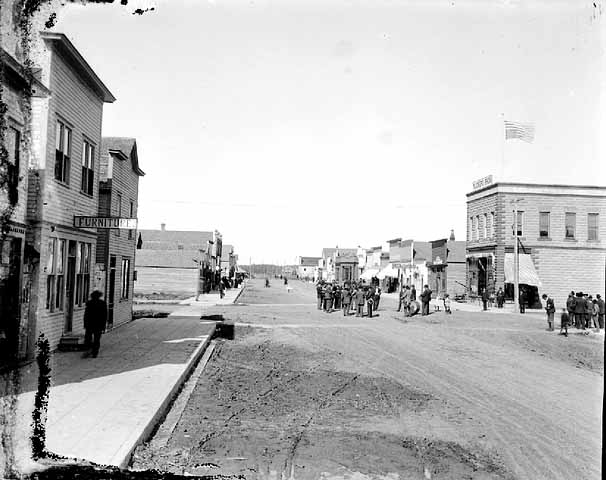
Roseau, (circa 1900)

=== 2020 census ===
As of the 2020 census, Roseau had a population of 2,744. The median age was 41.3 years. 23.4% of residents were under the age of 18 and 22.2% of residents were 65 years of age or older. For every 100 females there were 97.8 males, and for every 100 females age 18 and over there were 95.4 males age 18 and over.

0.0% of residents lived in urban areas, while 100.0% lived in rural areas.

There were 1,240 households in Roseau, of which 25.2% had children under the age of 18 living in them. Of all households, 40.4% were married-couple households, 23.7% were households with a male householder and no spouse or partner present, and 29.5% were households with a female householder and no spouse or partner present. About 42.1% of all households were made up of individuals and 18.8% had someone living alone who was 65 years of age or older.

There were 1,371 housing units, of which 9.6% were vacant. The homeowner vacancy rate was 1.6% and the rental vacancy rate was 12.8%.

Racial composition as of the 2020 census
Race	Number	Percent
White	2,508	91.4%
Black or African American	28	1.0%
American Indian and Alaska Native	28	1.0%
Asian	43	1.6%
Native Hawaiian and Other Pacific Islander	2	0.1%
Some other race	46	1.7%
Two or more races	89	3.2%
Hispanic or Latino (of any race)	75	2.7%

=== 2010 census ===
As of the census of 2010, there were 2,633 people, 1,142 households, and 682 families living in the city. The population density was 986.1 inhabitants per square mile (380.7/km^{2}). There were 1,288 housing units at an average density of 482.4 per square mile (186.3/km^{2}). The racial makeup of the city was 97.6% White, 0.3% African American, 0.6% Native American, 0.4% Asian, 0.1% from other races, and 0.9% from two or more races. Hispanic or Latino of any race were 1.1% of the population.

There were 1,142 households, of which 31.4% had children under the age of 18 living with them, 45.5% were married couples living together, 10.0% had a female householder with no husband present, 4.2% had a male householder with no wife present, and 40.3% were non-families. 37.0% of all households were made up of individuals, and 17.6% had someone living alone who was 65 years of age or older. The average household size was 2.23 and the average family size was 2.91.

The median age in the city was 39.6 years. 26.1% of residents were under the age of 18; 6.1% were between the ages of 18 and 24; 24.9% were from 25 to 44; 25.3% were from 45 to 64; and 17.7% were 65 years of age or older. The gender makeup of the city was 47.2% male and 52.8% female.

=== 2000 census ===
As of the census of 2000, there were 2,756 people, 1,157 households, and 713 families living in the city. The population density was 1,153.6 inhabitants per square mile (445.4/km^{2}). There were 1,229 housing units at an average density of 514.4 per square mile (198.6/km^{2}). The racial makeup of the city was 98.48% White, 0.04% African American, 0.51% Native American, 0.36% Asian, 0.07% from other races, and 0.54% from two or more races. Hispanic or Latino of any race were 0.40% of the population.

There were 1,157 households, out of which 31.5% had children under the age of 18 living with them, 50.0% were married couples living together, 8.6% had a female householder with no husband present, and 38.3% were non-families. 34.3% of all households were made up of individuals, and 16.7% had someone living alone who was 65 years of age or older. The average household size was 2.29 and the average family size was 2.96.

In the city, the population was spread out, with 26.3% under the age of 18, 6.9% from 18 to 24, 27.1% from 25 to 44, 20.9% from 45 to 64, and 18.8% who were 65 years of age or older. The median age was 38 years. For every 100 females, there were 92.9 males. For every 100 females age 18 and over, there were 86.4 males.

The median income for a household in the city was $35,096, and the median income for a family was $44,922. Males had a median income of $31,547 versus $22,419 for females. The per capita income for the city was $18,371. About 3.2% of families and 6.1% of the population were below the poverty line, including 2.8% of those under age 18 and 15.4% of those age 65 or over.

== Economy ==
Roseau is home to a manufacturing and plastic molding injection facility of Polaris Industries, a leading manufacturer of snowmobiles and all-terrain vehicles.

== Arts and culture ==
The Scandinavian Festival is held each year and showcases the community's ethnic heritage. The Roseau Pioneer Farm and Village was established in 1975 and is an agricultural museum.

== Sports ==
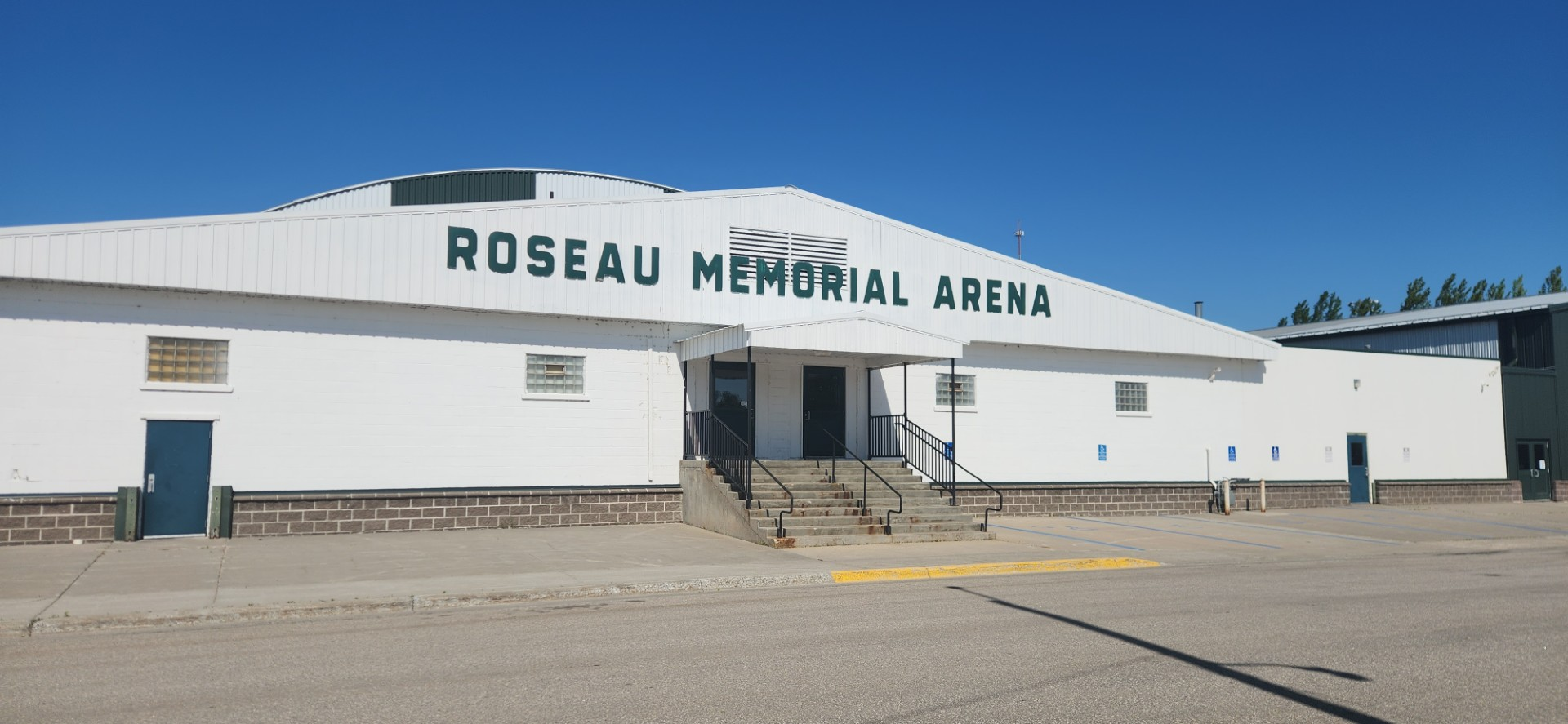
Roseau Memorial Arena

Roseau High School has a strong hockey tradition, having competed in the Minnesota state hockey boy's tournament more than any other team in the state (most recently in 2014) and won the second-most state titles, behind Edina.

== Media ==
=== Radio ===
- KCAJ FM 102.1, broadcasts from Roseau
- KRXW FM 103.5, KKWQ FM 92.5, and KRWB (AM) 1410, all broadcast from Warroad

=== Television ===
- KXJB-LD (CBS)
- WDAZ-TV (ABC)
- KAWE (PBS)
- KVLY-TV (NBC)
- KBRR (FOX)

== Infrastructure ==
=== Transportation ===
Minnesota State Highways 11, 89, and 310 are three of the main routes in the community.

The Minnesota Northern Railroad provides freight rail services for Polaris, Inc.

== Notable people ==
- Earl Anderson, former NHL player with Boston Bruins and Detroit Red Wings.
- Liz Anderson, country music singer of the 1960s, mother of Lynn Anderson; grew up in Roseau, moved away at age 13.
- Mike Baumgartner, former NHL player with Kansas City Scouts was born in Roseau.
- Phil Bengtson, former head coach of Green Bay Packers and New England Patriots.
- Robert Bergland, former congressman and Secretary of Agriculture during the Carter Administration.
- Rube Bjorkman, played ice hockey for the U.S. team at the 1948 and 1952 Winter Olympics.
- Aaron Broten, former NHL player.
- Neal Broten, member of USA's 1980 gold medal-winning "Miracle on Ice" Olympic hockey team and NHL player.
- Paul Broten, former NHL player
- Dustin Byfuglien, plays for NHL's Winnipeg Jets; won a Stanley Cup with Chicago Blackhawks in 2010.
- Norman Carlberg, sculptor
- Bryan "Butsy" Erickson, former (NHL) player with Washington Capitals, Los Angeles Kings, Pittsburgh Penguins, and Winnipeg Jets.
- Luke Erickson, professional hockey player; he was born in Roseau.
- Dan Fabian, former Minnesota state legislator.
- John Harris, ice hockey and golf player at University of Minnesota and professionally; in 1993, at age 41, won U.S. Amateur; also won Champions Tour Commerce Bank Championship in 2006; grew up in Roseau.
- Garrett Hedlund, actor in movies and TV shows such as Tron: Legacy, Country Strong, Troy, Four Brothers, Eragon and Tulsa King was born in Roseau.
- Aaron Ness, NHL player for New York Islanders.
- Maxine Penas, Minnesota state legislator.
- Dale Smedsmo, former NHL player with Toronto Maple Leafs.
