= Baudette International Airport =

Public-use airport in Lake of the Woods County

- IATA: BDE; ICAO: KBDE; FAA LID: BDE

Summary
- Airport type: Public
- Owner: Lake of the Woods County
- Serves: Baudette, Minnesota
- Elevation AMSL: 1,086 ft (331 m)
- Coordinates: 48°43′42″N 094°36′44″W

Map
- Location of airport in Minnesota/United States BDE (the United States)

Runways
Direction	Length		Surface
Direction	ft	m	Surface
12/30	5,499	1,676	Asphalt
13W/31W	6,000	1,829	Water

Statistics (2010)
- Aircraft operations: 12,825
- Based aircraft: 17
- Source: Federal Aviation Administration

Baudette International Airport (IATA: BDE, ICAO: KBDE, FAA LID: BDE) is a county-owned public-use airport located one mile (2 km) north of the central business district of Baudette, a city in Lake of the Woods County, Minnesota, United States. Also known as Baudette International Airport & Seaplane Base, it is located on the Rainy River, which is the border between Minnesota in the U.S. and Ontario in Canada.

== Facilities and aircraft ==
Baudette International Airport covers an area of 364 acres (147 ha) at an altitude of 1,086 feet (331 m) above mean sea level. It has one runway designated 12/30 with a 5,499 x 100 ft (1,676 x 30 m) asphalt surface. The airport also has a seaplane landing area designated 13W/31W and measuring 6,000 x 1,200 ft (1,829 x 366 m) which is located on Rainy River. It shares its airspace and waterway with neighboring Rainy River Water Aerodrome in Canada.

For the 12-month period ending January 30, 2012, the airport had 12,825 aircraft operations, an average of 35 per day: 94% general aviation, 5% air taxi and 1% military. At that time there were 11 aircraft based at this airport: 15 single-engine, 1 multi-engine, 1 ultralight.

== See also ==
- List of airports in Minnesota
