= Baudette, Minnesota =

City in Minnesota, United States

- City
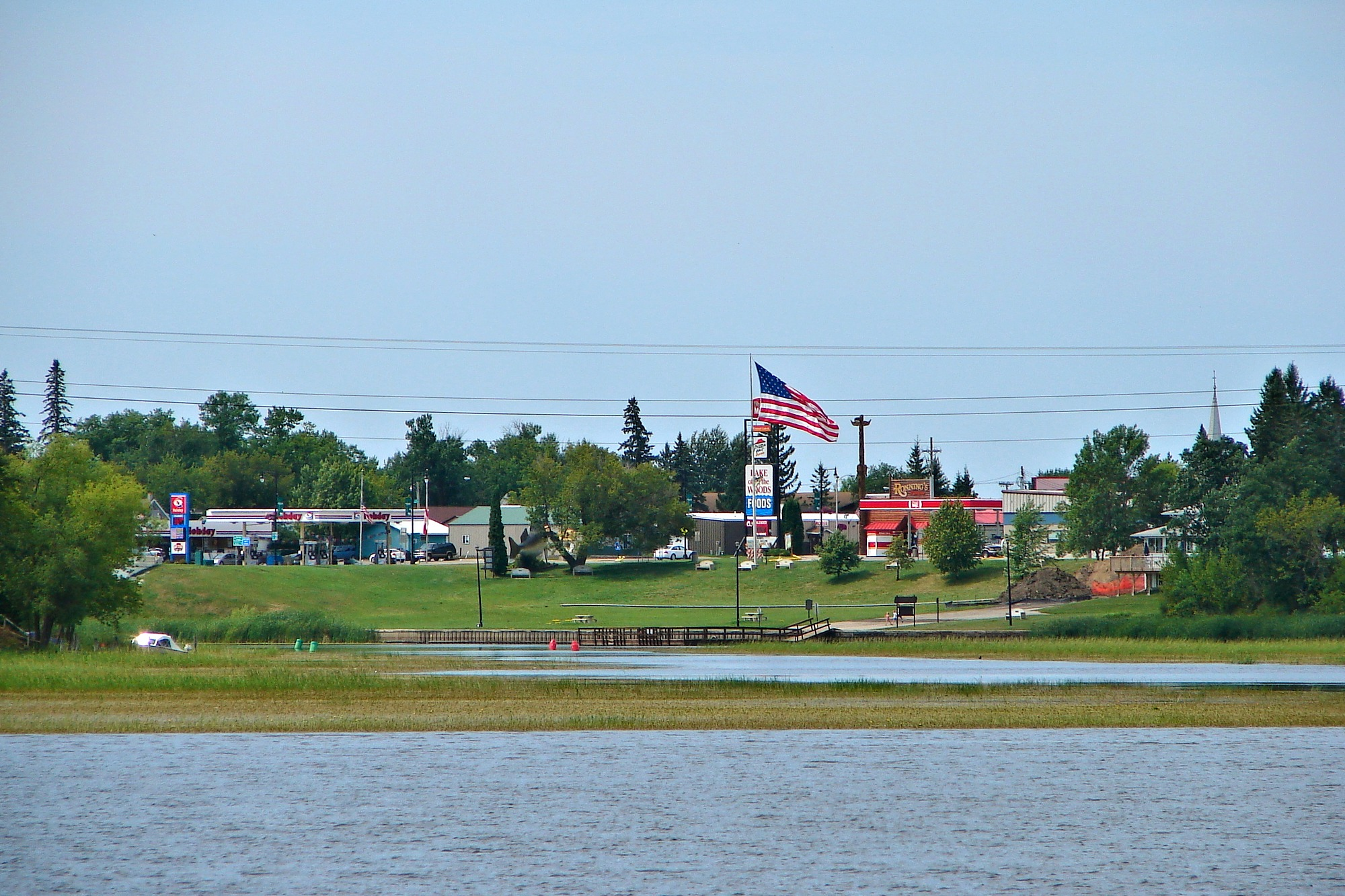

- Location of Baudette within Lake of the Woods County and state of Minnesota

- Location within the United States
- Coordinates: 48°42′45″N 94°35′42″W
- Country: United States
- State: Minnesota
- County: Lake of the Woods
- Incorporated: 1907

Government
  - Mayor: Dylan Hancharyk
  - Council: Cole Nelson; Steve Theis, Jr. Steve Johnson; Benjamin Davidson; Silas Black; Lawson Black

Area
  - Total: 4.71 sq mi (12.21 km^{2})
  - Land: 4.24 sq mi (10.97 km^{2})
  - Water: 0.48 sq mi (1.24 km^{2})
- Elevation: 1,089 ft (332 m)

Population (2020)
  - Total: 966
  - Estimate (2022): 955
  - Density: 228.2/sq mi (88.09/km^{2})
- Time zone: UTC-6 (Central (CST))
  - Summer (DST): UTC-5 (CDT)
- ZIP code: 56623
- Area code: 218
- FIPS code: 27-04024
- GNIS feature ID: 0639732
- Website: ci.baudette.mn.us

Baudette is a city in and the county seat of Lake of the Woods County, Minnesota, United States. As of the 2020 census, its population was 966. Baudette is known as the Walleye Capital of the World.

== History ==
Baudette was incorporated in 1907. It was started by European Americans as a steamboat landing and lumber town with a sawmill, after the railroad was constructed through the area in 1901. It was named for Joseph Beaudette, a trapper of French-Canadian descent who had been in the area since the early 1880s. The post office at Baudette began in 1900, first called "Port Hyland", after postmaster Daniel Hyland. The name was changed to "Baudette" in 1901. Baudette had a station of the Minnesota and Manitoba Railroad, now absorbed by the Canadian National Railway.

Baudette was largely destroyed in the Baudette Fire of 1910, but was quickly rebuilt. Many of its people were saved by a train with boxcars sent across the river from Rainy River, Ontario, which pulled survivors to safety on the other side.

== Geography ==
The city is along the Rainy River at its confluence with the Baudette River. It lies across the river from Rainy River, Ontario, and southeast of Lake of the Woods.

Baudette and Rainy River are connected by the Baudette–Rainy River International Bridge.

Minnesota Highway 11, Minnesota Highway 72, and Minnesota Highway 172 are three of the community's main routes. Highway 11 leads northwest 36 miles (58 km) to Warroad at the southwest end of Lake of the Woods and east 68 miles (109 km) to International Falls, while Highway 72 leads south 76 miles (122 km) to Blackduck and Highway 172 leads north 12 miles (19 km) to Wheelers Point at the mouth of the Rainy River into Lake of the Woods.

According to the United States Census Bureau, the city has an area of 4.66 square miles (12.07 km^{2}), of which 4.25 square miles (11.01 km^{2}) are land and 0.41 square miles (1.06 km^{2}) are water.

== Climate ==
Baudette has a humid continental climate (Köppen Dfb) with mild to warm summers along with dry and severely cold winters.

Climate data for Baudette, Minnesota (1991–2020 normals, extremes 1908–present)
Month	Jan	Feb	Mar	Apr	May	Jun	Jul	Aug	Sep	Oct	Nov	Dec	Year
Record high °F (°C)	50 (10)	59 (15)	76 (24)	91 (33)	96 (36)	102 (39)	103 (39)	101 (38)	95 (35)	87 (31)	75 (24)	54 (12)	103 (39)
Mean maximum °F (°C)	37.8 (3.2)	42.8 (6.0)	55.4 (13.0)	73.4 (23.0)	83.3 (28.5)	88.4 (31.3)	89.0 (31.7)	88.9 (31.6)	84.1 (28.9)	73.5 (23.1)	54.1 (12.3)	40.0 (4.4)	91.9 (33.3)
Mean daily maximum °F (°C)	16.9 (−8.4)	23.7 (−4.6)	37.1 (2.8)	52.8 (11.6)	66.2 (19.0)	76.2 (24.6)	80.9 (27.2)	79.2 (26.2)	70.1 (21.2)	54.1 (12.3)	36.5 (2.5)	22.9 (−5.1)	51.4 (10.8)
Daily mean °F (°C)	5.8 (−14.6)	11.0 (−11.7)	25.0 (−3.9)	40.8 (4.9)	54.1 (12.3)	64.6 (18.1)	69.0 (20.6)	67.2 (19.6)	57.8 (14.3)	43.9 (6.6)	27.7 (−2.4)	13.3 (−10.4)	40.0 (4.4)
Mean daily minimum °F (°C)	−5.3 (−20.7)	−1.8 (−18.8)	12.9 (−10.6)	28.8 (−1.8)	42.0 (5.6)	52.9 (11.6)	57.2 (14.0)	55.2 (12.9)	45.6 (7.6)	33.7 (0.9)	18.9 (−7.3)	3.7 (−15.7)	28.6 (−1.9)
Mean minimum °F (°C)	−31.9 (−35.5)	−26.5 (−32.5)	−13.6 (−25.3)	12.3 (−10.9)	27.5 (−2.5)	39.0 (3.9)	46.0 (7.8)	42.5 (5.8)	31.5 (−0.3)	19.0 (−7.2)	−1.1 (−18.4)	−22.6 (−30.3)	−33.8 (−36.6)
Record low °F (°C)	−51 (−46)	−48 (−44)	−45 (−43)	−19 (−28)	−12 (−24)	23 (−5)	34 (1)	28 (−2)	17 (−8)	−8 (−22)	−29 (−34)	−45 (−43)	−51 (−46)
Average precipitation inches (mm)	0.52 (13)	0.53 (13)	0.67 (17)	1.25 (32)	3.17 (81)	4.22 (107)	3.72 (94)	3.43 (87)	3.61 (92)	2.14 (54)	0.99 (25)	0.80 (20)	25.05 (636)
Average precipitation days (≥ 0.01 in)	6.0	4.4	5.3	6.4	10.8	11.6	10.5	10.2	11.2	9.9	6.6	7.2	100.1
Source: NOAA

== Demographics ==
Historical population
Census	Pop.	Note	%±
1910	897		—
1920	960		7.0%
1930	822		−14.4%
1940	1,017		23.7%
1950	929		−8.7%
1960	1,597		71.9%
1970	1,547		−3.1%
1980	1,170		−24.4%
1990	1,146		−2.1%
2000	1,104		−3.7%
2010	1,106		0.2%
2020	966		−12.7%
2022 (est.)	955		−1.1%
U.S. Decennial Census; 2020 Census

=== 2010 census ===
As of the census of 2010, there were 1,106 people, 489 households, and 273 families living in the city. The population density was 260.2 inhabitants per square mile (100.5/km^{2}). There were 577 housing units at an average density of 135.8 per square mile (52.4/km^{2}). The racial makeup of the city was 94.4% White, 0.1% African American, 0.7% Native American, 0.8% Asian, 0.5% from other races, and 3.4% from two or more races. Hispanic or Latino of any race were 1.8% of the population.

There were 489 households, of which 27.8% had children under the age of 18 living with them, 41.9% were married couples living together, 10.0% had a female householder with no husband present, 3.9% had a male householder with no wife present, and 44.2% were non-families. 39.7% of all households were made up of individuals, and 18.2% had someone living alone who was 65 years of age or older. The average household size was 2.17 and the average family size was 2.95.

The median age in the city was 46.1 years. 23.5% of residents were under the age of 18; 5.4% were between the ages of 18 and 24; 19.8% were from 25 to 44; 29% were from 45 to 64; and 22.2% were 65 years of age or older. The gender makeup of the city was 46.3% male and 53.7% female.

=== 2000 census ===
As of the census of 2000, there were 1,104 people, 490 households, and 271 families living in the city. The population density was 334.1 inhabitants per square mile (129.0/km^{2}). There were 540 housing units at an average density of 163.4 per square mile (63.1/km^{2}). The racial makeup of the city was 94.02% White, 0.54% African American, 2.90% Native American, 0.36% Asian, 0.18% from other races, and 1.99% from two or more races. Hispanic or Latino of any race were 0.72% of the population.

There were 490 households, out of which 28.0% had children under the age of 18 living with them, 43.1% were married couples living together, 9.6% had a female householder with no husband present, and 44.5% were non-families. 41.0% of all households were made up of individuals, and 22.2% had someone living alone who was 65 years of age or older. The average household size was 2.16 and the average family size was 2.97.

In the city, the population was spread out, with 24.7% under the age of 18, 5.9% from 18 to 24, 23.0% from 25 to 44, 21.9% from 45 to 64, and 24.5% who were 65 years of age or older. The median age was 42 years. For every 100 females, there were 86.8 males. For every 100 females age 18 and over, there were 82.2 males.

The median income for a household in the city was $31,281, and the median income for a family was $43,000. Males had a median income of $32,500 versus $22,500 for females. The per capita income for the city was $16,653. About 6.5% of families and 9.1% of the population were below the poverty line, including 7.6% of those under age 18 and 17.6% of those age 65 or over.

== Economy ==
Baudette was home to Rowell Laboratories, Inc., a manufacturer of pharmaceutical products, from 1935 to 1986. Rowell initially achieved success by processing and selling burbot liver oil, after it was discovered to improve the fur of foxes living in the Rowell family fox farm. Rowell's downtown location is now home to ANI Pharmaceuticals Inc.

Automotive Enviro Testing, a cold weather test facility used by Honda, Acura, and Tesla, is in Baudette.

== Media ==
=== Radio ===
- KRWB (AM) 1410 Roseau
- KKWQ 92.5 Warroad
- KPMI-FM 94.5 Baudette
- KCAJ-FM 102.1 Roseau

=== Television ===
Channel	Callsign	Affiliation	Branding	Subchannels		Owner
(Virtual)	Callsign	Affiliation	Branding	Channel	Programming	Owner
9.1	K25MW-D (KAWE Translator)	PBS	Lakeland PBS	9.2; 9.3; 9.4; 9.5; 9.6	First Nations Experience; PBS Kids; Create; PBS Encore; Minnesota Channel	Lake of the Woods County
34.1	K14PH-D (KVLY/KXJB Translator)	KVLY (NBC)	KVLY 11 (34.1); KX4 (34.2)	34.2	KXJB (CBS)	Lake of the Woods County
36.1	K16KE-D (WDAZ/KBRR Translator)	WDAZ (ABC)	WDAZ 8 (36.1); KVRR (36.2)	36.2	KBRR (Fox)	Lake of the Woods County

== Notable people ==
- Keith Ballard, ice hockey defenseman for the Minnesota Wild
- Alex Lyon, ice hockey goaltender for the Buffalo Sabres
- Wally Olds, ice hockey defenseman, 1972 Silver Medal Olympian and All-American; also has his likeness painted on the side of the VFW
- Theodore H. Rowell, pharmaceutical industrialist and politician

== See also ==
- Baudette International Airport
