= KCAJ-FM =

- Roseau, Minnesota; United States
- Broadcast area: Northwest Minnesota; Southeast Manitoba; Northwest Ontario
- Frequency: 102.1 MHz
- Branding: Wild 102

Programming
- Format: Adult contemporary
- Affiliations: AccuWeather; NBC News Radio; Red River Farm Network

Ownership
- Owner: North Country Media

History
- First air date: June 1996

Technical information
- Licensing authority: FCC
- Facility ID: 29635
- Class: C2
- ERP: 50,000 watts
- HAAT: 87 meters (285 ft)
- Transmitter coordinates: 48°38′50.0″N 95°44′10.0″W

Links
- Public license information: Public file; LMS
- Webcast: Listen live
- Website: www.wild102fm.com

KCAJ-FM (102.1 FM, "Wild 102") is an adult contemporary formatted broadcast radio station licensed to Roseau, Minnesota, serving Northwest Minnesota, Southeast Manitoba, and Northwest Ontario. KCAJ-FM is owned and operated by North Country Media. Studios and offices are at 107 Center St West, in downtown Roseau. Their transmitter site is along Highway 89 in Wannaska, MN.
