= Rainy River, Ontario =

Rainy River
- Town (single-tier)
- Town of Rainy River
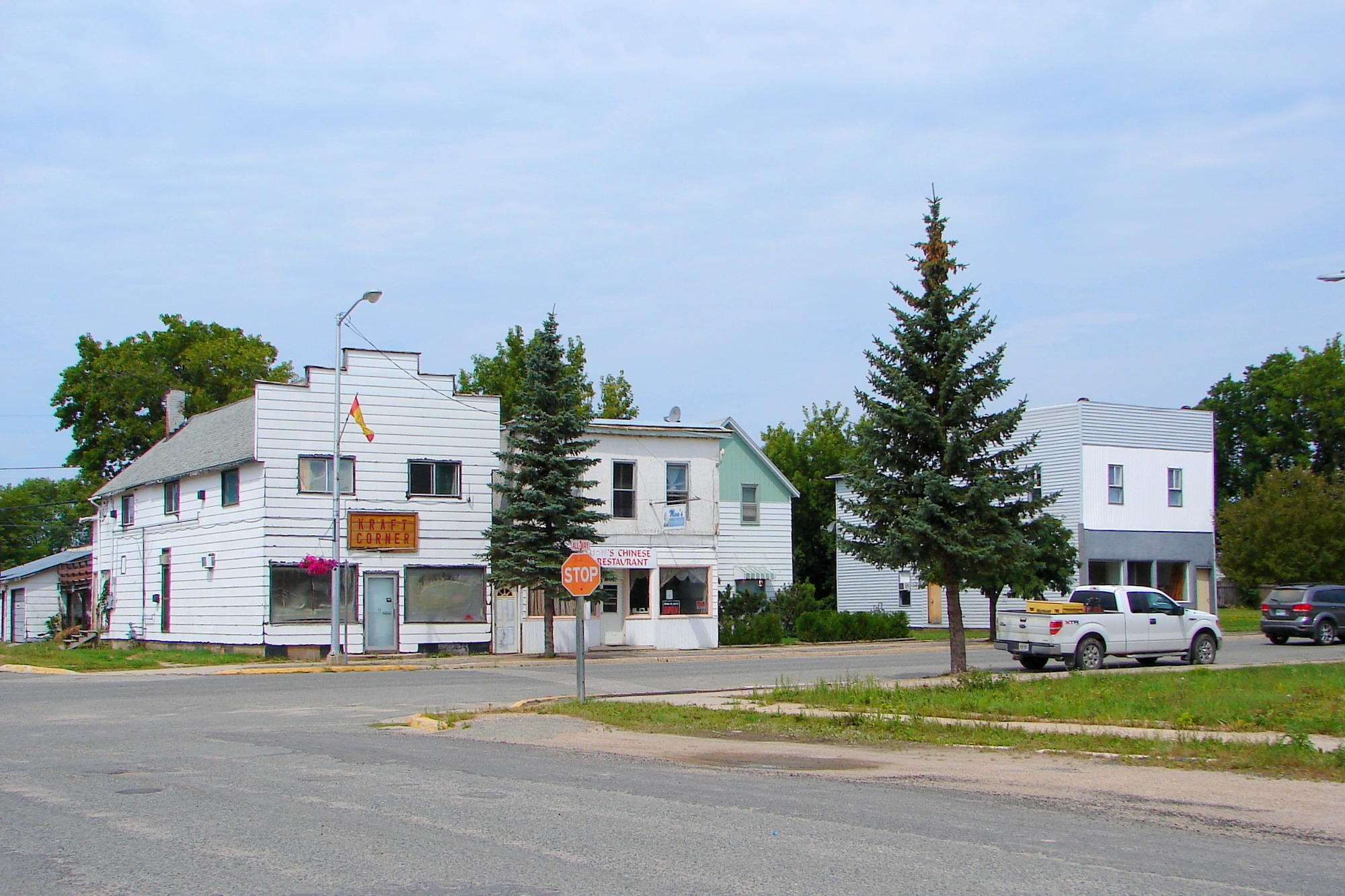

- Location within Ontario
- Coordinates: 48°43′N 94°34′W
- Country: Canada
- Province: Ontario
- District: Rainy River
- Settled: 1895
- Incorporated: 1901 (township)
- Incorporated: 1902 (town)

Government
  - Type: Town
  - Mayor: Deborah Ewald
  - Fed. riding: Thunder Bay—Rainy River
  - Prov. riding: Kenora—Rainy River

Area
  - Land: 3.12 km^{2} (1.20 sq mi)

Population (2021)
  - Total: 752
  - Density: 241.4/km^{2} (625/sq mi)
- Time zone: UTC−6 (CST)
  - Summer (DST): UTC−5 (CDT)
- Postal code: P0W 1L0
- Area code: 807
- Website: www.rainyriver.ca

Rainy River is a town in north-western Ontario, Canada, southeast of Lake of the Woods. Rainy River is situated on the eponymous Rainy River, which forms part of the Ontario–Minnesota segment of the Canada–US border. Across the river is the town of Baudette, Minnesota. The two towns are connected by the Baudette – Rainy River International Bridge. Rainy River is at the northwestern terminus of Highway 11.

Rainy River was frequently thought to have been the northwestern terminus of Yonge Street (which runs north from Toronto) due to it being incorrectly thought as being synonymous with the entire length of Highway 11. Because of this incorrect conflation, Yonge Street was considered the longest street in the world and was listed as such in the Guinness Book of World Records until 1999. Highway 11 is named Atwood Avenue through Rainy River, although the town and the City of Toronto both maintain commemorative markers at each end.

== History ==
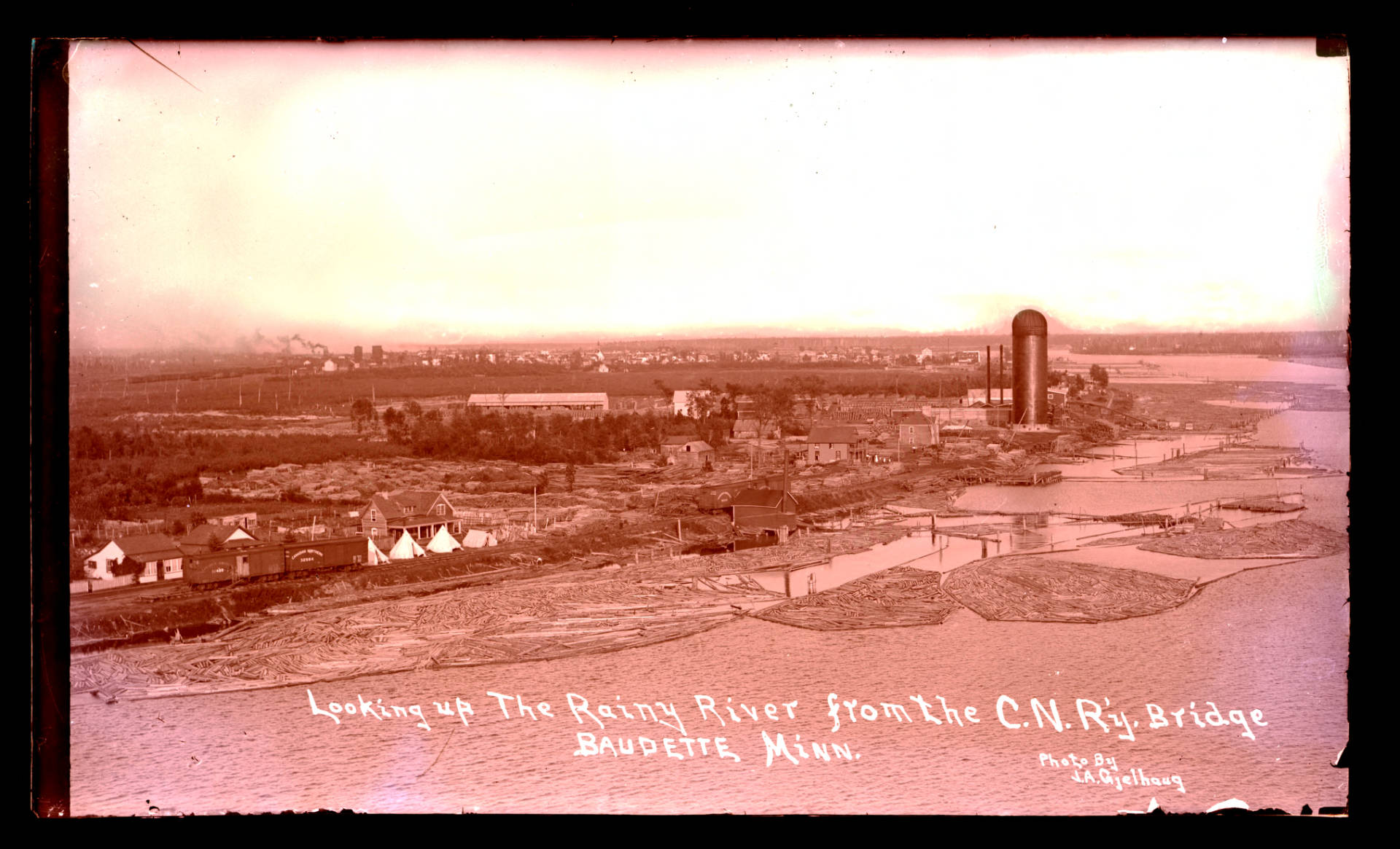
Big mill in Rainy River from the CNR railway bridge

From Rainy Lake, derived from the French Lac la Pluie. Appears as Rain Lake in 1813 Gazetteer. A post office named Rainy River was established in 1886. Incorporated as the town of Rainy River in 1904, the community was first formed around 1895 as part of mill development by a group of lumbermen along the northeast shore of the Rainy River. Their mill and related developments were located about 2 km from the current town centre. In 1898 their mill was purchased by the Beaver Mills Lumber Company. The small village took the name Beaver Mills until it was incorporated as a town. In 1901 the Ontario and Rainy River Railway completed a bridge connecting Minnesota, United States to Ontario, but the Beaver Mills town site was in the way of the eastern end. The company developed a new town further upriver, between the two large lumber mills. The only method of transport at the time was by steamship so parts of the bridge were shipped and arrived addressed to "Rainy River". The town eventually accepted this as their name.

The lumber industry and associated mills stimulated growth of the town, as did the Railway. In 1910, a forest fire known as the Great Fire of 1910, originating in northern Minnesota, swept north and destroyed the mills. On the southern, US side of the river, the villages of Baudette and Spooner were destroyed in the fire. Most survivors from the US-side survived because residents from Rainy River backed a train of box cars across the bridge and pulled the people north to safety. After the fire, the mill industry relocated. The population of Rainy River quickly declined from more than 2000 people to less than 800. No alternative economy was developed to support a larger population.

The town of Rainy River pivoted industry to railway and hunting/fishing tourism. But the railroad and the growing hunting/fishing tourism industry have helped the town to survive. At one time it was the site of a rail round house and associated jobs. In the 1960s the Rainy River Boat company operated here, and in the 1970s Arctic Cat Apparel manufactured related clothing. The decline of these industries has greatly affected the remote town.

== Demographics ==
In the 2021 Census of Population conducted by Statistics Canada, Rainy River had a population of 752 living in 366 of its 398 total private dwellings, a change of −6.8% from its 2016 population of 807. With a land area of 3.12 km^{2} (1.20 sq mi), it had a population density of 241.0/km^{2} (624.3/sq mi) in 2021.

Canada census – Rainy River community profile

	2021	2016	2011
Population	752 (-6.8% from 2016)	807 (−4.2% from 2011)	842 (−7.4% from 2006)
Land area	3.12 km^{2} (1.20 sq mi)	3.11 km^{2} (1.20 sq mi)	2.99 km^{2} (1.15 sq mi)
Population density	241.4/km^{2} (625/sq mi)	259.9/km^{2} (673/sq mi)	281.5/km^{2} (729/sq mi)
Median age	54.0 (M: 53.2, F: 55.2)	52.6 (M: 51.6, F: 54.2)	50.8 (M: 49.2, F: 51.9)
Private dwellings	398 (total) 366 (occupied)	434 (total)	457 (total)
Median household income	$69,000	$59,520

References: 2021 2016 2011

Rainy River (town) historical populations

Year	Pop.	±%
1911	1,578	—
1921	1,444	−8.5%
1931	1,402	−2.9%
1941	1,205	−14.1%
1951	1,348	+11.9%
1956	1,354	+0.4%
1961	1,168	−13.7%

Year	Pop.	±%
1966	1,149	−1.6%
1971	1,196	+4.1%
1976	1,092	−8.7%
1981	1,061	−2.8%
1986	941	−11.3%
1991	968	+2.9%
1996	1,008	+4.1%

Year	Pop.	±%
2001	981	−2.7%
2006	909	−7.3%
2011	842	−7.4%
2016	807	−4.2%
2021	752	−6.8%

Source: Statistics Canada

== Government ==
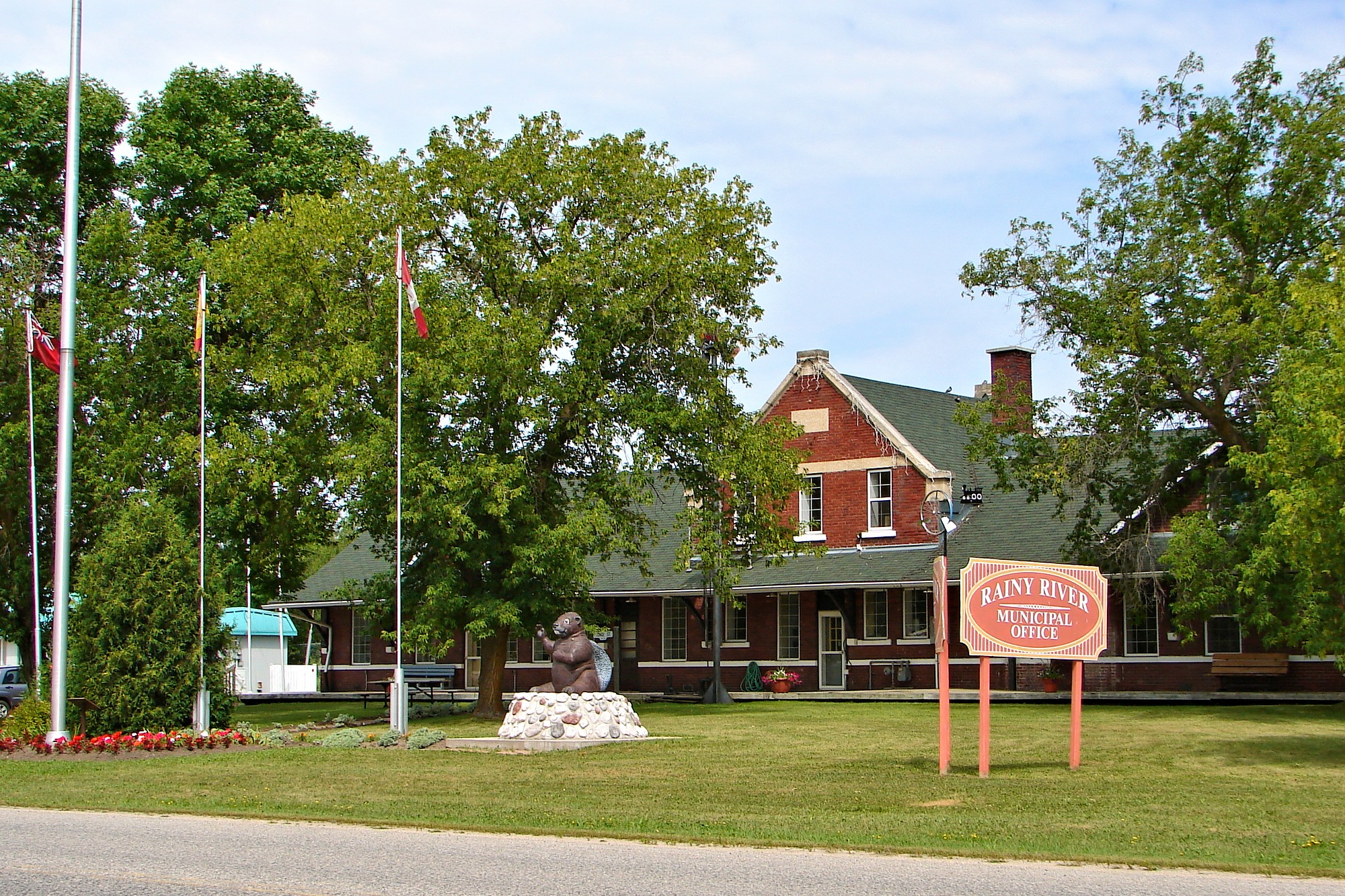
Rainy River Town Hall, formerly the town's train station

=== Federal representation ===
The town is in the Canadian electoral district of Thunder Bay—Rainy River, which elects one Member of Parliament (MP) to represent it in Parliament.

=== City Mayor and Council ===
The city is headed by Rainy River Mayor and six elected city councillors.

== Notable people ==
- Bronko Nagurski, Hall of fame NFL player
- James Arthur Mathieu, businessman and politician
- Angela Bulloch, sound and installation artist

== See also ==
- The Great Fire of 1910
- SS Keenora (river ship)
- Ontario and Rainy River Railway
