= KKWQ =

Coordinates: 48.8280°N 95.3880°W

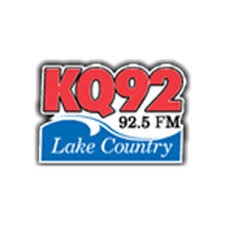
- Warroad, Minnesota; United States
- Frequency: 92.5 MHz
- Branding: Lake Country KQ92

Programming
- Format: Country
- Affiliations: ABC News Radio

Ownership
- Owner: Border Broadcasting
- Sister stations: KRWB

Technical information
- Licensing authority: FCC
- Facility ID: 16576
- Class: C1
- ERP: 100,000 watts

Links
- Public license information: Public file; LMS
- Webcast: Listen live
- Website: kq92.com

KKWQ (92.5 FM) is a small local radio station broadcasting from the border town of Warroad, Minnesota. It is owned and operated by Border Broadcasting, along with sister station KRWB. They share studios at 113 Lake St NW, in Warroad. The transmitter site is SW of Warroad on Country Road 12. A 100,000 watt transmitter and 460 foot tower gives them a large coverage area covering NW Minnesota, including the Northwest Angle and parts of Manitoba and Ontario.

Its format is country music, and they broadcast 24 hours a day.
