= Ontario and Rainy River Railway =

Railway line in Canada

Overview
- Operator: McKenzie and Mann
- Headquarters: Several; Branch offices: Fort Frances, Ontario; Shipyards: Rainy River
- Locale: Rainy River to Fort Frances, Ontario, Canada
- Dates of operation: 1886–1900
- Successor: Canadian Northern Railway, Canadian National Railway

The Ontario and Rainy River Railway was a railway that existed briefly in the late 19th century in northwestern Ontario, Canada. The company had been incorporated in 1886 to build a railway from Port Arthur to the Rainy River. On 4 May 1899, the chief promoters of the Canadian Northern Railway, William Mackenzie and Donald Mann, announced they had acquired the railway charter. Construction of the line began at Stanley on 1 August 1898.

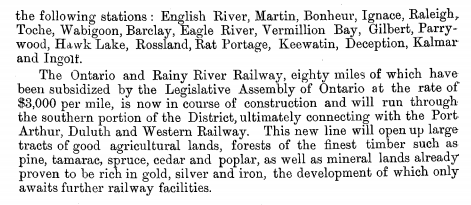
Ontario and Rainy River Railway

The rail line ran from Stanley to Rainy River with eventual plans to connect to Port Arthur in the east, and to the Manitoba and Southeastern Railway, via a new steel bridge at Rainy River. After the Baudette-Rainy River Rail Bridge was completed in 1901, the company was quickly absorbed by the Canadian Northern Railway, which built a roundhouse, a bunkhouse (to house train crews between shifts), a hotel and several other pieces of equipment at the town. It was taken over and absorbed by the Canadian National Railway in 1923, and still operates as an active rail line.

== Stations ==
- Atikokan: demolished and replaced by CNR station in 1923
- Rainy River: now 201 Atwood Avenue (Highway 11) and 4th Street (next to Ontario Travel office) and now used as Rainy River Municipal offices and seniors centre
- Stratton: moved to end of Theker Street and current vacant
- Barwick: moved to Lake Road and currently vacant
- Fort Frances: now at 140 Fourth Street West at Cornwall Avenue and used as office space and community use (Fort Frances Volunteer Bureau, local MP office, etc...)
- Thunder Bay: now 2212 Sleeping Giant Parkway near North Water Street and used as commercial and offices

== See also ==
- List of Ontario railways
- List of defunct Canadian railways
