= KRWB (AM) =

Coordinates: 48°50′40″N 95°43′41″W

- Roseau, Minnesota; United States
- Broadcast area: Roseau and Warroad
- Frequency: 1410 kHz
- Branding: The Northern Star

Programming
- Format: Classic hits, News
- Affiliations: ABC News Radio

Ownership
- Owner: Border Broadcasting
- Sister stations: KKWQ

History
- First air date: April 5, 1963
- Call sign meaning: Roseau Warrod B order Broadcasting

Technical information
- Licensing authority: FCC
- Facility ID: 57076
- Class: D
- Power: 1,000 watts day 72 watts night
- Translator: 102.9 K275BB (Roseau)

Links
- Public license information: Public file; LMS
- Webcast: Listen live
- Website: kq92.com

KRWB (1410 kHz) is a news and classic hits formatted AM radio station, licensed to Roseau, Minnesota, USA. It is owned and operated by Border Broadcasting, along with a sister station, KKWQ. They share studios at 113 Lake St NW, in Warroad. Their two tower transmitter site is on County Road 28, east of Roseau.

On November 7, 2024, KRWB changed their format from classic rock to news and "Super Hits", branded as "The Northern Star".
