= Wheeler Township, Lake of the Woods County, Minnesota =

Township in Minnesota, United States

Coordinates: 48.53486°N 94.89890°W

Wheeler Township, Minnesota
- Township
- Location of Wheeler Township, within Lake of the Woods County, Minnesota
- Country: United States
- State: Minnesota
- County: Lake of the Woods

Area
  - Total: 19.65 sq mi (50.9 km^{2})
  - Land: 19.02 sq mi (49.3 km^{2})
  - Water: 0.63 sq mi (1.6 km^{2})

Population (2020)
  - Total: 306
  - Density: 16.1/sq mi (6.21/km^{2})
- Time zone: UTC-6 (Central (CST))
  - Summer (DST): UTC-5 (CDT)
- Area code: 218

Wheeler Township is a township in Lake of the Woods County, Minnesota, United States. The population was 306 at the 2020 United States census.

== Geography ==
According to the United States Census Bureau, the township has a total area of 19.5 square miles (50.6 km^{2}), of which 18.9 square miles (48.9 km^{2}) is land and 0.6 square mile (1.6 km^{2}) (3.23%) is water.

== Demographics ==
As of the census of 2000, there were 386 people, 168 households, and 110 families residing in the township. The population density was 20.4 people per square mile (7.9/km^{2}). There were 372 housing units at an average density of 19.7/sq mi (7.6/km^{2}). The racial makeup of the township was 99.74% White and 0.26% Native American.

There were 168 households, out of which 28.0% had children under the age of 18 living with them, 61.3% were married couples living together, 2.4% had a female householder with no husband present, and 34.5% were non-families. 30.4% of all households were made up of individuals, and 10.7% had someone living alone who was 65 years of age or older. The average household size was 2.30 and the average family size was 2.86.

In the township the population was spread out, with 23.6% under the age of 18, 4.9% from 18 to 24, 26.4% from 25 to 44, 27.7% from 45 to 64, and 17.4% who were 65 years of age or older. The median age was 43 years. For every 100 females, there were 100.0 males. For every 100 females age 18 and over, there were 106.3 males.

The median income for a household in the township was $37,321, and the median income for a family was $36,696. Males had a median income of $29,306 versus $23,611 for females. The per capita income for the township was $17,055. About 7.4% of families and 3.6% of the population were below the poverty line, including none of those under the age of 18 or 65 or over.
