= Rainy River (Minnesota–Ontario) =

River forming part of the border between Ontario (Canada) and Minnesota (US)

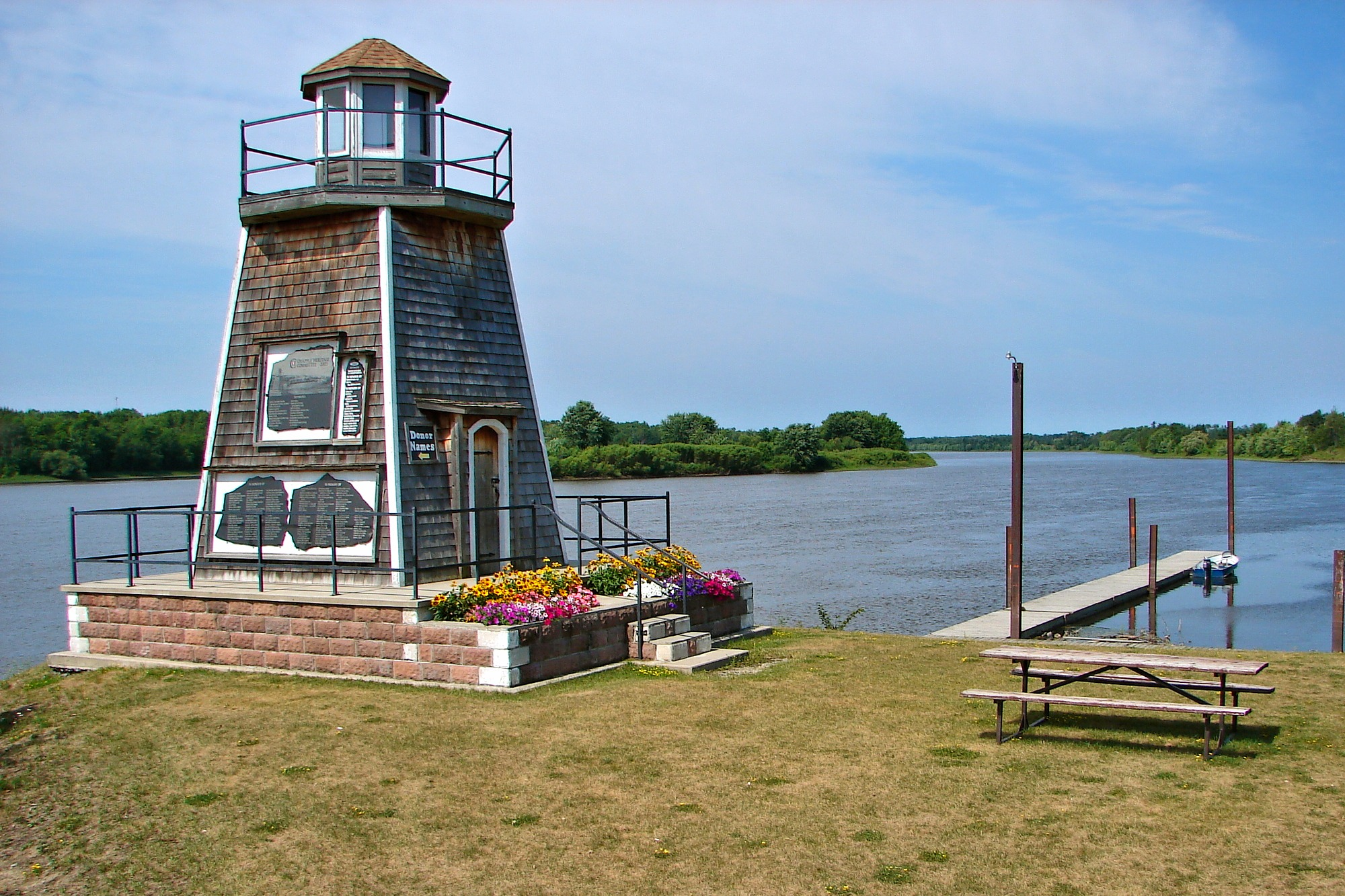
- Rainy River at Barwick, Ontario

- Mouth of the Rainy River

Location
- Country: United States, Canada
- State: Minnesota, Ontario
- County: Lake of the Woods, Koochiching

Physical characteristics
- Source
  - location: Ranier, Minnesota
  - coordinates: 48.6149353°N 93.3532024°W
- Mouth
  - location: Wheeler's Point, Lake of the Woods
  - coordinates: 48.8485930°N 94.6916009°W
- Length: 137 miles (220 km)

Basin features
- Progression: Rainy River→ Lake of the Woods→ Winnipeg River→ Nelson River→ Hudson Bay
- Tributaries
  - right: Wabanica Creek, Baudette River, Whitefish Creek, West Fork Black River, Black River, Big Fork River, Little Fork River, Wilson Creek, Cripple Creek

The Rainy River (French: Rivière à la Pluie; Ojibwe: Gojiji-ziibi) is a river, approximately 137 miles (220 km) long, forming part of the Canada–United States border separating Northwestern Ontario and northern Minnesota.

== History ==
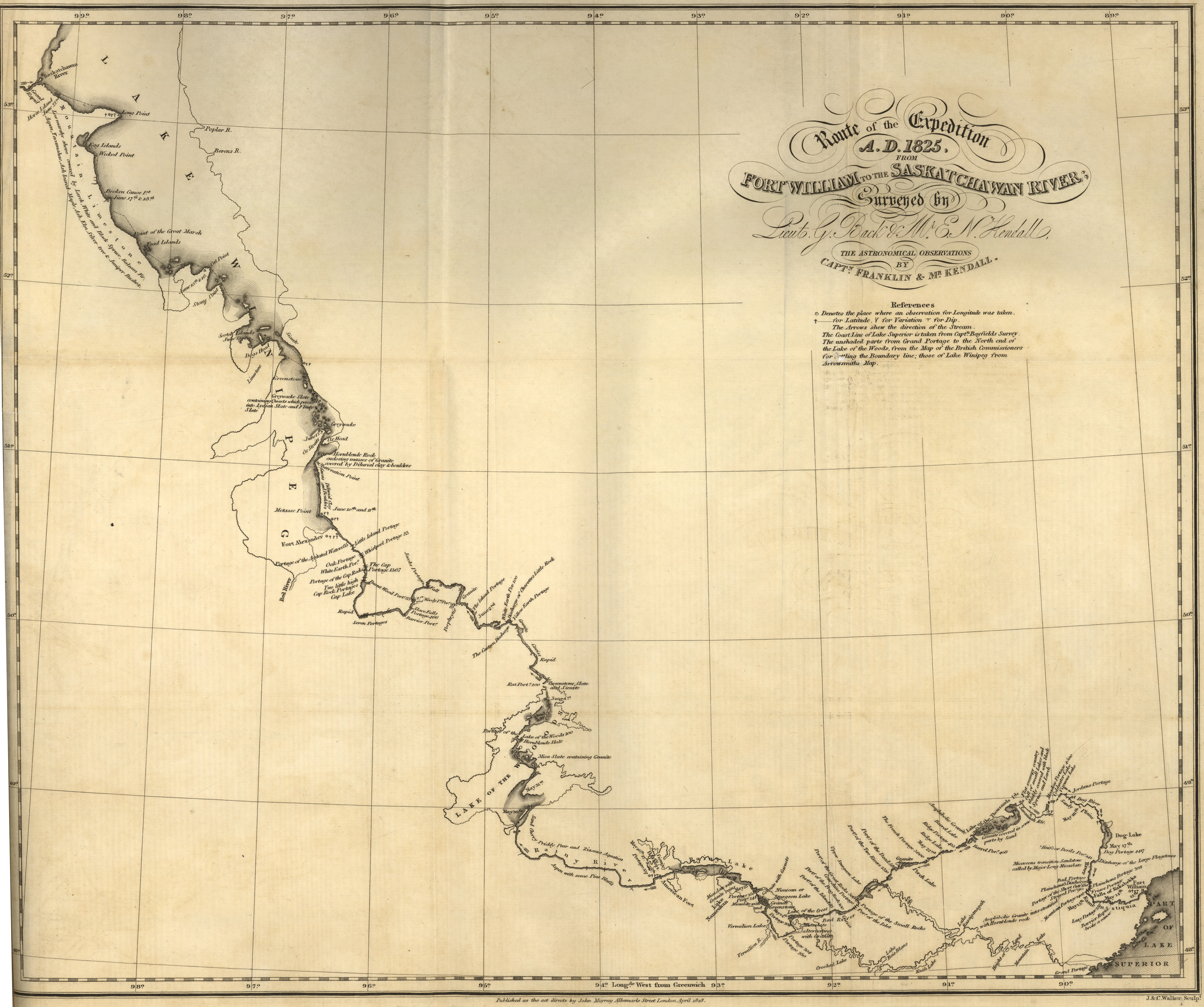
A map of the river charted by an expedition in 1825

The river issues from the west side of Rainy Lake (French: lac à la Pluie; Ojibwe: Gojiji-zaaga'igan) and flows generally west-northwest, between International Falls, Minnesota, and Fort Frances, Ontario, and between Baudette, Minnesota, and Rainy River, Ontario. The Couchiching First Nation (the Ojibwe name spelled in transliterated form) is associated with this river, where it had traditional territory.

The name of Koochiching County, Minnesota was derived from the Ojibwe term. Rainy Lake and the river were named by French colonists. These names were translated and adopted into English by British colonists. The town of Rainy River, Ontario was not developed until the late 19th century and not named until the early 20th century.

The river enters the southern end of Lake of the Woods approximately 19 kilometres (12 mi) northwest of the towns of Baudette and Rainy River. A dam at International Falls generates hydroelectricity from the river. The drainage basin of the river stretches east to the height of land about 100 kilometres (62 mi) west of Lake Superior. It was the southeast corner of the huge tract of land granted in 1670 by the English Crown to the Hudson's Bay Company. The river ultimately drains through the Winnipeg River, Lake Winnipeg, and the Nelson River into Hudson Bay.

The Baudette-Rainy River International Bridge and the Fort Frances-International Falls International Bridge both cross the Rainy River.

The Ontario and Rainy River Railway, opened in 1901 and now part of Canadian National, follows the river on the Canadian side.

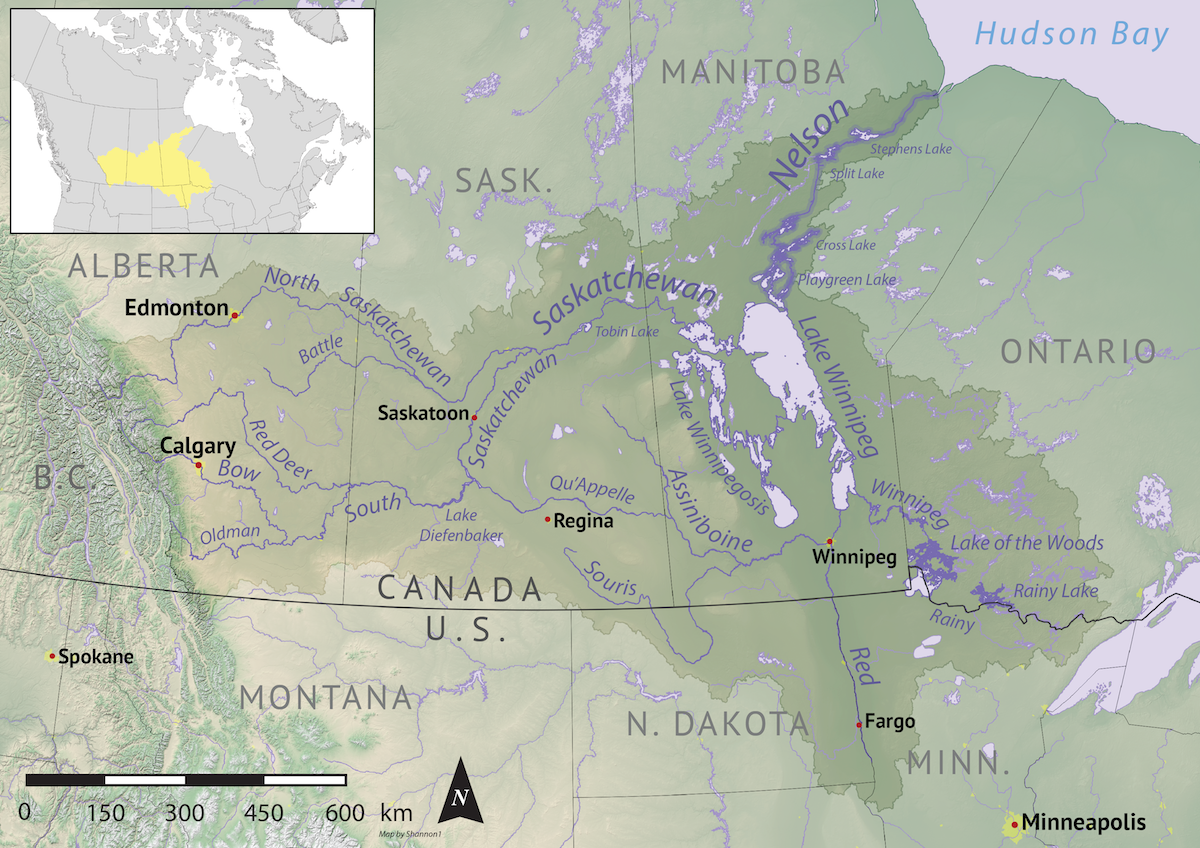
Rainy River flows west to Lake of the Woods (lower right) forming part of the Canada-U.S. border and ultimately drains through Nelson River to Hudson Bay in the north

== Notoriety ==
A white sucker weighing 6lb 8oz caught on the Rainy River near Loman, Minnesota stands as the IGFA all tackle world record.

American author Tim O'Brien's novel The Things They Carried (1990), set during the Vietnam War, includes a chapter, "On the Rainy River," referring to this territory.

== See also ==
- Pigeon River
- Winnipeg River, for exploration and fur trade
- List of rivers of Minnesota
- List of longest streams of Minnesota
- List of international border rivers
- List of Ontario rivers
- Rainy Lake
- Lake sturgeon
