= List of historic places in Pembina Valley =

This is a list of historic places in Pembina Valley Region, Manitoba entered on the Canadian Register of Historic Places, whether they are federal, provincial, or municipal.

== List of historic places ==
Name	Address	Coordinates	Government recognition (CRHP №)	Wikidata ID	Image
Fowler House	111 Elizabeth Avenue East; Argyle MB	49°23′06″N 99°14′47″W	Argyle municipality (6909)		Upload Photo
Marringhurst Heritage House	NW 20-3-12 W Argyle MB	49°14′03″N 99°03′54″W	Argyle municipality (3886)		Upload Photo
Union Point United Church	Morris MB	49°31′22″N 97°13′39″W	Morris municipality (15746)		Upload Photo
Bryce House	99 Assiniboine Street; Emerson MB	49°00′23″N 97°12′42″W	Emerson municipality (3217)		Upload Photo
Canadian Pacific Railway Station	6th Street (at Morris St.); Emerson MB	49°00′17″N 97°12′12″W	Federal (4559)		Upload Photo
Masonic Lodge	1 First Street; Emerson MB	49°00′23″N 97°12′48″W	Emerson municipality (3330)		Upload Photo
Emerson Court House and Town Hall	104 Church Street; Emerson MB	49°00′20″N 97°12′43″W	Manitoba (3431)		More images
Presbyterian Church Manse	129 Park Street; Emerson MB	49°00′27″N 97°12′52″W	Emerson municipality (8234)		Upload Photo
Fort Dufferin National Historic Site of Canada	Highway 75, 3 miles north of Emerson; Emerson MB	49°01′53″N 97°12′14″W	Federal (12688)		More images
Rodmond Roblin House	NE 24-6-4 WPM; Carman MB	49°29′48″N 97°52′05″W	Carman municipality (2768)		Upload Photo
Carman Canadian National Railways Station	38 Centre Avenue West; Carman MB	49°30′26″N 98°00′31″W	Carman municipality (2769)		Upload Photo
Sexsmith House	18 Kings Park Road; Carman MB	49°30′10″N 98°01′01″W	Carman municipality (3176)		More images
Bergthaler Waisenamt	48 Main Street; Altona MB	49°06′24″N 97°33′27″W	Altona municipality (3214)		Upload Photo
Winkler House	590 Hespeler Avenue; Gretna MB	49°00′29″N 97°33′50″W	Gretna municipality (3328)		
Manitou Town Hall	325 Main Street; Manitou MB	49°14′23″N 98°32′15″W	Manitou municipality (3324)		
Memorial Hall	12-2nd Avenue SW; Carman MB	49°30′23″N 98°00′11″W	Carman municipality (3327)		
Log Cabin	Highway Number 3 and Main Street Junction; Manitou MB	49°14′03″N 98°32′10″W	Manitou municipality (3361)		
Friesen Interpretive Centre	89 Road 1 West; Altona MB	49°02′32″N 97°17′10″W	Altona municipality (3367)		Upload Photo
Herdsman's House	89 Road 1 West; Altona MB	49°06′N 97°33′W	Altona municipality (3369)		Upload Photo
Convent of the Sisters of the Holy Names of Jesus and Mary	144 Caron Street; Montcalm MB	49°15′54″N 97°20′31″W	Manitoba (4171)		Upload Photo
Darlingford Consolidated School	20 Bradburn Street; Pembina MB	49°12′18″N 98°22′52″W	Pembina municipality (3755)		Upload Photo
St. Luke's Anglican Church - Pembina Crossing	South of Manitou; Pembina MB	49°09′00″N 98°33′36″W	Pembina municipality (19383)		Upload Photo
St. Mary's and St. Albans Anglican Church	West of Kaleida; Pembina MB	49°07′04″N 98°30′53″W	Pembina municipality (19378)		Upload Photo
Royal Bank Building	72 3rd Street; Montcalm MB	49°22′04″N 97°56′22″W	Montcalm municipality (5077)		Upload Photo
Miami Railway Station (Canadian Northern) National Historic Site of Canada	Highway 23; Miami MB	49°22′16″N 98°14′38″W	Federal (4229), Miami municipality (11117)		
Carman Dominion Post Office	15 1st Avenue SW; Carman MB	49°30′26″N 98°00′11″W	Carman municipality (4259)		Upload Photo
Hamm House	1. 68 Road 2 West Rhineland MB	49°02′32″N 97°17′10″W	Rhineland municipality (4501)		Upload Photo
Carman United Church	143 First Street SW; Carman MB	49°30′13″N 98°00′12″W	Carman municipality (4566)		More images
Boyne School	Carman MB	49°30′09″N 97°55′46″W	Carman municipality (5053)		More images
Schwartz House	245 10th Avenue NW; Altona MB	49°06′41″N 97°34′11″W	Altona municipality (5444)		Upload Photo
Blacksmith Shop	Veteran Drive at Bowles Street; Cartwright MB	49°05′39″N 99°20′19″W	Cartwright municipality (3748)		Upload Photo
Christ Anglican Church	Broadway at Curwen Street; Cartwright MB	49°05′44″N 99°20′25″W	Cartwright municipality (6659)		Upload Photo
Mount Prospect School	350 Broadway Avenue; Cartwright MB	49°05′24″N 99°20′31″W	Cartwright municipality (5475)		Upload Photo
La Rivière Canadian Pacific Railway Station	Pembina MB	49°17′52″N 98°38′14″W	Manitoba (5797)		Upload Photo
Archibald United Church	Pembina MB	49°17′52″N 98°38′14″W	Pembina municipality (5833)		Upload Photo
Star Mound School	SE 27-1-10 WPM; Pembina MB	49°03′35″N 98°43′30″W	Pembina municipality (5844)		More images
Lea House	Pembina MB	49°07′49″N 98°35′26″W	Pembina municipality (5993)		Upload Photo
Darlingford Memorial and Park	Mountain Avenue; Pembina MB	49°12′19″N 98°22′48″W	Manitoba (6731)		Upload Photo
Klippenstein House	14 Centre Avenue East; Altona MB	49°06′21″N 97°33′08″W	Altona municipality (6827)		Upload Photo
Manitou Cenotaph	SW corner of Main Street and Park Avenue; Manitou MB	49°14′26″N 98°32′20″W	Manitou municipality (19376)		
Mowbray School	Manitou MB	49°01′49″N 98°26′08″W	Manitoba (6853)		Upload Photo
St. Andrew's United Church	338 Hamilton Street; Manitou MB	49°14′30″N 98°32′25″W	Manitou municipality (19375)		
St. John the Baptist Anglican Church	252 Hamilton Street; Manitou MB	49°14′28″N 98°32′27″W	Manitou municipality (19377)		Upload Photo
Roseisle School	1st Avenue; Dufferin MB	49°29′56″N 98°20′33″W	Dufferin municipality (6933)		Upload Photo
Our Lady of Assumption Parish	305 St. Paul Street, Mariapolis; Lorne MB	49°21′34″N 98°59′10″W	Lorne municipality (20265)		
Ste. Therese Roman Catholic Church	Lorne MB	49°29′39″N 98°33′15″W	Lorne municipality (7398)		
Hooper House	35161, Road 10W; Morris MB	49°31′44″N 97°41′00″W	Morris municipality (8505)		Upload Photo
Neubergthal Street Village National Historic Site of Canada	Provincial Road 421; Rhineland MB	49°04′30″N 97°28′55″W	Federal (13161)		
Ens Heritage Homestead	141 Reinland Avenue; Stanley MB	49°02′27″N 97°51′58″W	Stanley municipality (17761)		Upload Photo
Sidney United Church and Manse	Maple Street; North Norfolk MB	49°53′54″N 99°04′52″W	North Norfolk municipality (4253)		Upload Photo
Crystal City Courier Building	218 Broadway Street; Crystal City MB	49°08′46″N 98°56′53″W	Manitoba (9402), Crystal City municipality (3759)		Upload Photo
Frikirkju (Bru) Lutheran Church	NE 30-6-12 WPM; Somerset MB	49°30′45″N 99°04′20″W	Somerset municipality (3902)		Upload Photo
Clearwater Canadian Pacific Railway Water Tower	11th Street; Louise MB	49°07′58″N 99°02′15″W	Manitoba (5114)		Upload Photo
Menarey House	Cartwright MB	49°07′45″N 99°24′57″W	Cartwright municipality (5476)		Upload Photo
Manitoba Telephone System Building	350 Broadway Avenue; Cartwright MB	49°05′27″N 99°20′41″W	Cartwright municipality (5482)		Upload Photo
Thomas Greenway Cemetery	Crystal City MB	49°09′12″N 98°57′11″W	Crystal City municipality (6430)		Upload Photo
Braun Mennonite Log House	Pembina Threshermen's Museum; Morden MB	49°11′30″N 98°00′58″W	Morden municipality (19374)		Upload Photo
Morden Canadian Pacific Railway Station	Pembina Threshermen's Museum; Morden MB	49°11′25″N 98°00′55″W	Morden municipality (19370)		Upload Photo
Morden Dominion Post Office	352 Stephen Street; Morden MB	49°11′26″N 98°06′00″W	Morden municipality (3187)		Upload Photo
Maple Leaf School	555 Thornhill Avenue; Morden MB	49°11′32″N 98°06′20″W	Morden municipality (3188)		
Pomeroy School	Pembina Threshermen's Museum; Morden MB	49°11′25″N 98°00′55″W	Morden municipality (19371)		Upload Photo
Reimer Mennonite Log House	Pembina Threshermen's Museum; Morden MB	49°11′25″N 98°00′55″W	Morden municipality (19372)		Upload Photo
Roseisle United Church	Pembina Threshermen's Museum; Morden MB	49°11′30″N 98°00′58″W	Morden municipality (19373)		Upload Photo
Stodders House	180 Nelson Street; Morden MB	49°11′32″N 98°06′11″W	Morden municipality (5129)		Upload Photo
McConnell House	577 Stephen Street; Morden MB	49°11′24″N 98°06′28″W	Morden municipality (6628)		Upload Photo
McElroy House	645 Thornhill Street; Morden MB	49°11′33″N 98°06′34″W	Morden municipality (6814)		Upload Photo
Opawaka School Site	Thompson MB	49°18′40″N 98°20′31″W	Thompson municipality (7362)		Upload Photo

== See also ==
- List of historic places in Manitoba
- List of National Historic Sites of Canada in Manitoba
