= List of historic places in Winnipeg =

This is a list of historic places in Winnipeg, Manitoba, Canada entered on the Canadian Register of Historic Places, whether they are federal, provincial, or municipal.

== List of historic places ==
Name	Address	Coordinates	Government recognition (CRHP №)	Wikidata ID	Image
Grey Nuns' Convent National Historic Site of Canada	494 Tache Avenue; St. Boniface MB	49°53′16″N 97°07′25″W	Federal (7420), Manitoba (8608), St. Boniface municipality (8607)		More images
Cathedral Church of Saint John	135 Anderson Avenue; Winnipeg MB	49°55′14″N 97°07′31″W	Manitoba (4508)		
Bernier House	265 Provencher Boulevard; Winnipeg MB	49°53′N 97°07′W	Manitoba (4151), Winnipeg municipality (7752)		More images
St. Boniface City Hall National Historic Site of Canada	219 Provencher Boulevard; St. Boniface MB	49°53′34″N 97°07′17″W	Federal (4444), St. Boniface municipality (5924)		More images
Maison Kittson	165 La Verendrye Street; Winnipeg MB	49°53′41″N 97°07′29″W	Winnipeg municipality (7365)		More images
St. Boniface Fire Hall No. 1	212 Rue Dumoulin; Winnipeg MB	49°53′36″N 97°07′15″W	Winnipeg municipality (8043)		More images
Belgian War Memorial	Provencher Boulevard; Winnipeg MB	49°53′42″N 97°06′40″W	Winnipeg municipality (8134)		More images
Belgian Club	407 Provencher Boulevard; Winnipeg MB	49°53′43″N 97°06′40″W	Winnipeg municipality (8232)		More images
St. Boniface Cathedral	190 Cathedral Avenue; Winnipeg MB	49°53′21″N 97°07′20″W	Manitoba (8394)		More images
St. Boniface Hospital Nurses' Residence National Historic Site of Canada	409 Tache Avenue; Winnipeg MB	49°53′08″N 97°07′26″W	Federal (13401)		More images
St. Boniface Normal School	210 Masson Street; Winnipeg MB	49°53′29″N 97°07′14″W	Winnipeg municipality (13545)		More images
St. Boniface Waterworks Water Tower	552 Plinguet Street; Winnipeg MB	49°53′33″N 97°06′06″W	Winnipeg municipality (8133)		
Greater Winnipeg Water District Railway Station	598 Plinguet Street; Winnipeg MB	49°53′36″N 97°06′00″W	Winnipeg municipality (8223)		
Fire Hall No. 8	325 Talbot Avenue; Winnipeg MB	49°54′28″N 97°06′37″W	Winnipeg municipality (7909)		
Riel House National Historic Site of Canada	330 River Road; Winnipeg MB	49°49′09″N 97°08′10″W	Federal (7762), Manitoba (9528)		More images
St. Vital Firehall	598-600 St. Mary's Road; Winnipeg MB	49°51′49″N 97°06′41″W	Winnipeg municipality (8214)		
Red River Floodway National Historic Site of Canada	Winnipeg MB	49°45′05″N 97°07′58″W	Federal (13693)		More images
Kildonan School	2373 Main Street; Winnipeg MB	49°57′13″N 97°05′51″W	Manitoba (4599)		Upload Photo
Kildonan Presbyterian Church	201 John Black Avenue; Winnipeg MB	49°57′11″N 97°05′56″W	Manitoba (6748), Winnipeg municipality (4639)		
Seven Oaks Museum	115 Rupertsland Blvd. Winnipeg MB	49°55′49″N 97°07′00″W	Winnipeg municipality (5925)		
Inkster House	1637 Main Street; Winnipeg MB	49°55′58″N 97°07′12″W	Winnipeg municipality (5931)		Upload Photo
McBeth House	31 McBeth Street; Winnipeg MB	49°57′23″N 97°05′06″W	Winnipeg municipality (8191)		Upload Photo
St. John's Telephone Exchange Building	405 Burrows Avenue; Winnipeg MB	49°55′03″N 97°08′16″W	Manitoba (4353)		Upload Photo
North End Police Substation	200 Charles Street; Winnipeg MB	49°54′54″N 97°08′06″W	Winnipeg municipality (6031)		Upload Photo
Bethlehem Aboriginal Fellowship Church	294 Burrows Avenue; Winnipeg MB	49°54′56″N 97°08′05″W	Winnipeg municipality (7908)		
All People's Sutherland Mission	119 Sutherland Avenue; Winnipeg MB	49°54′21″N 97°07′39″W	Winnipeg municipality (8122)		Upload Photo
St. John's Presbyterian Church	251 Bannerman Avenue; Winnipeg MB	49°55′32″N 97°07′37″W	Winnipeg municipality (8584)		Upload Photo
St. John's Church	250 Cathedral Avenue; Winnipeg MB	49°55′28″N 97°07′41″W	Winnipeg municipality (8585)		Upload Photo
St. Michael's Ukrainian Orthodox Church	110 Disraeli Street; Winnipeg MB	49°54′21″N 97°07′30″W	Winnipeg municipality (11537)		Upload Photo
Ukrainian Labour Temple National Historic Site of Canada	591-595 Pritchard Avenue; Winnipeg MB	49°55′04″N 97°08′55″W	Federal (13921), Manitoba (3954), Winnipeg municipality (6725)		
Scott Fruit Company Warehouse	319 Elgin Avenue; Winnipeg MB	49°54′03″N 97°08′30″W	Winnipeg municipality (3022)		Upload Photo
Central Normal School (Winnipeg)	442 William Avenue; Winnipeg MB	49°54′05″N 97°08′52″W	Manitoba (3908), Winnipeg municipality (8309)		
First Scandinavian Mission Church	268 Ellen Street; Winnipeg MB	49°54′00″N 97°08′46″W	Manitoba (3973), Winnipeg municipality (7336)		Upload Photo
Garry Telephone Exchange Building	474 Hargrave Street; Winnipeg MB	49°54′N 97°09′W	Manitoba (4175)		Upload Photo
W.M. Ashdown House	121 Kate Street; Winnipeg MB	49°54′09″N 97°09′07″W	Winnipeg municipality (5594)		Upload Photo
Gault Building	100 Arthur Street; Winnipeg MB	49°53′54″N 97°08′33″W	Winnipeg municipality (5845)		Upload Photo
Penrose House	444 Logan Avenue; Winnipeg MB	49°54′19″N 97°08′41″W	Winnipeg municipality (6075)		Upload Photo
McCormicks Limited Building	425 Henry Avenue; Winnipeg MB	49°54′23″N 97°08′34″W	Winnipeg municipality (6096)		Upload Photo
Drake Hotel	146 Princess Street; Winnipeg MB	49°54′00″N 97°08′30″W	Winnipeg municipality (7347)		
House of Comoy	150 Princess Street; Winnipeg MB	49°54′00″N 97°08′29″W	Winnipeg municipality (7349)		Upload Photo
Hochman Building	154 Princess Street; Winnipeg MB	49°54′00″N 97°08′29″W	Winnipeg municipality (7350)		
Exchange Building	160 Princess Street; Winnipeg MB	49°54′01″N 97°08′29″W	Winnipeg municipality (7351)		Upload Photo
Utility Building	164 Princess Street; Winnipeg MB	49°54′01″N 97°08′29″W	Winnipeg municipality (7359)		More images
Adelman Building	92-100 Princess Street; Winnipeg MB	49°53′54″N 97°08′33″W	Winnipeg municipality (7741)		Upload Photo
Bathgate Block	242 Princess Street; Winnipeg MB	49°54′10″N 97°08′22″W	Winnipeg municipality (8051)		
Ryan Block	44 Princess Street; Winnipeg MB	49°53′49″N 97°08′38″W	Winnipeg municipality (8237)		Upload Photo
Stovel Printing Building	365 Bannatyne Avenue; Winnipeg MB	49°54′00″N 97°08′43″W	Winnipeg municipality (8583)		Upload Photo
Sterling Cloak Building	110 Princess Street; Winnipeg MB	49°53′57″N 97°08′32″W	Winnipeg municipality (8610)		Upload Photo
Frost and Wood Warehouse	230 Princess Street; Winnipeg MB	49°54′08″N 97°08′23″W	Winnipeg municipality (8669)		Upload Photo
Henderson Building	332 Bannatyne Avenue; Winnipeg MB	49°53′56″N 97°08′37″W	Winnipeg municipality (8811)		Upload Photo
Western Glove Works	321 McDermot Avenue; Winnipeg MB	49°53′54″N 97°08′38″W	Winnipeg municipality (9404)		Upload Photo
Kelly House	88 Adelaide Street; Winnipeg MB	49°53′55″N 97°08′37″W	Winnipeg municipality (9462)		Upload Photo
Earn International Building	78 Princess Street; Winnipeg MB	49°53′53″N 97°08′34″W	Winnipeg municipality (12048)		Upload Photo
Independent Order of Odd Fellows Hall	72 Princess Street; Winnipeg MB	49°53′52″N 97°08′35″W	Winnipeg municipality (12923)		Upload Photo
Former Union Bank Building / Annex National Historic Site of Canada	500-504 Main Street; Winnipeg MB	49°53′56″N 97°08′21″W	Federal (1136)		
Exchange District National Historic Site of Canada	North of Portage and Main; Winnipeg MB	49°53′55″N 97°08′26″W	Federal (1208)		More images
Peck Building	33 Princess Street; Winnipeg MB	49°53′47″N 97°08′36″W	Winnipeg municipality (2579)		
Telegram Building	70 Albert Street; Winnipeg MB	49°53′49″N 97°08′26″W	Winnipeg municipality (2763)		
Union Station / Winnipeg Railway Station (Canadian National) National Historic Site of Canada	123 Main Street; Winnipeg MB	49°53′20″N 97°08′03″W	Federal (4484, (4514)		
Ashdown Warehouse	167 Bannatyne Avenue; Winnipeg MB	49°53′45″N 97°08′13″W	Winnipeg municipality (4633)		
Lake of the Woods Building	212 McDermot Avenue; Winnipeg MB	49°53′49″N 97°08′23″W	Winnipeg municipality (4636)		Upload Photo
Walker Theatre	364 Smith Street; Winnipeg MB	49°53′45″N 97°08′37″W	Federal (7747), Manitoba (5265), Winnipeg municipality (5261)		More images
Stovel Block	245 McDermot Avenue; Winnipeg MB	49°53′51″N 97°08′28″W	Winnipeg municipality (5402)		More images
Sparling Sales Ltd. Building	120 King Street; Winnipeg MB	49°53′56″N 97°08′27″W	Winnipeg municipality (5597)		
Isbister School	310 Vaughan Street; Winnipeg MB	49°53′33″N 97°09′04″W	Winnipeg municipality (5834)		More images
Isbister School	310 Vaughan Street; Winnipeg MB	49°53′33″N 97°09′04″W	Manitoba (5835)		
Western Building	90 Albert Street; Winnipeg MB	49°53′51″N 97°08′26″W	Winnipeg municipality (5849)		Upload Photo
Marshall-Wells Building	123 Bannatyne Avenue; Winnipeg MB	49°53′51″N 97°08′07″W	Winnipeg municipality (5851)		Upload Photo
Paris Building	259 Portage Avenue; Winnipeg MB	49°53′41″N 97°08′29″W	Winnipeg municipality (5852)		
Fire Hall No. 3	56 Maple Street; Winnipeg MB	49°54′13″N 97°07′54″W	Winnipeg municipality (5853)		
Greater Winnipeg Gas Company Building	265 Notre Dame Avenue; Winnipeg MB	49°53′46″N 97°08′32″W	Winnipeg municipality (5854)		Upload Photo
Curry Building	233 Portage Avenue; Winnipeg MB	49°53′42″N 97°08′26″W	Winnipeg municipality (5927)		
YMCA Building	301 Vaughan Street; Winnipeg MB	49°53′32″N 97°08′59″W	Winnipeg municipality (5928)		Upload Photo
Dawson Richardson Building	171 McDermot Avenue; Winnipeg MB	49°53′50″N 97°08′14″W	Winnipeg municipality (5929)		
Sures Building	246 McDermot Avenue; Winnipeg MB	49°53′49″N 97°08′27″W	Winnipeg municipality (5930)		Upload Photo
Union Tower Building	191 Lombard Avenue; Winnipeg MB	49°53′47″N 97°08′18″W	Winnipeg municipality (5932)		Upload Photo
Grange Building	173 McDermot Avenue; Winnipeg MB	49°53′50″N 97°08′15″W	Winnipeg municipality (6012)		Upload Photo
Benard House	454 Edmonton Street; Winnipeg MB	49°53′51″N 97°09′01″W	Winnipeg municipality (6076)		Upload Photo
Waddell Fountain	410 Cumberland Avenue; Winnipeg MB	49°53′47″N 97°08′55″W	Manitoba (6737), Winnipeg municipality (6595)		Upload Photo
Lighthouse Mission	669 Main Street; Winnipeg MB	49°54′12″N 97°08′05″W	Winnipeg municipality (6728)		Upload Photo
Royal Albert Arms Hotel	48 Albert Street; Winnipeg MB	49°53′46″N 97°08′27″W	Winnipeg municipality (6736)		More images
Toronto Type Foundry Building	175 McDermot Avenue; Winnipeg MB	49°53′51″N 97°08′15″W	Winnipeg municipality (6830)		Upload Photo
Donald H. Bain Building	115 Bannatyne Avenue; Winnipeg MB	49°53′50″N 97°08′05″W	Winnipeg municipality (6836)		Upload Photo
Criterion Hotel	214 McDermot Avenue; Winnipeg MB	49°53′49″N 97°08′23″W	Winnipeg municipality (6905)		Upload Photo
McClary Building	185 Bannatyne Avenue; Winnipeg MB	49°53′54″N 97°08′17″W	Winnipeg municipality (6967)		Upload Photo
Maltese Cross Building	66 King Street; Winnipeg MB	49°53′50″N 97°08′31″W	Winnipeg municipality (7023)		Upload Photo
Bank of Toronto	456 Main Street; Winnipeg MB	49°53′51″N 97°08′22″W	Winnipeg municipality (7338)		Upload Photo
W.F. Alloway Building	179 McDermot Avenue; Winnipeg MB	49°53′51″N 97°08′16″W	Winnipeg municipality (7339)		Upload Photo
Northern Electric Building	140 Bannatyne Avenue; Winnipeg MB	49°53′50″N 97°08′11″W	Winnipeg municipality (7340)		Upload Photo
Edmonton Street Duplex	368-370 Edmonton Street; Winnipeg MB	49°53′42″N 97°08′56″W	Winnipeg municipality (7344)		Upload Photo
Alloway and Champion Bank	667 Main Street; Winnipeg MB	49°54′11″N 97°08′06″W	Winnipeg municipality (7346)		Upload Photo
Pantages Playhouse Theatre	180 Market Avenue; Winnipeg MB	49°53′56″N 97°08′16″W	Federal (12956), Manitoba (7397), Winnipeg municipality (7367)		More images
Canadian Pacific Railway Station (Winnipeg) National Historic Site of Canada	181 Higgins Avenue; Winnipeg MB	49°54′16″N 97°07′54″W	Federal (7402, (6467), Manitoba (6345), Winnipeg municipality (6343)		More images
Confederation Building National Historic Site of Canada	457 Main Street; Winnipeg MB	49°53′54″N 97°08′20″W	Federal (7599), Winnipeg municipality (5950)		More images
Galpern Building	165 McDermot Avenue; Winnipeg MB	49°53′50″N 97°08′14″W	Winnipeg municipality (7719)		Upload Photo
Warwick Apartments	366 Qu'Appelle Avenue; Winnipeg MB	49°53′43″N 97°08′52″W	Winnipeg municipality (7727)		Upload Photo
New Hargrave Building	361-365 Hargrave Street; Winnipeg MB	49°53′43″N 97°08′43″W	Winnipeg municipality (7870)		Upload Photo
Odd Fellows Temple Facade	Winnipeg MB	49°53′34″N 97°08′56″W	Winnipeg municipality (8193)		
Wesley Hall	515 Portage Avenue; Winnipeg MB	49°53′27″N 97°09′12″W	Winnipeg municipality (8224)		
Ukrainian Cultural Centre	184 Alexander Avenue; Winnipeg MB	49°54′04″N 97°08′09″W	Winnipeg municipality (8226)		
Miller and Richard Type Foundry Building	121/123 Princess Street; Winnipeg MB	49°53′56″N 97°08′29″W	Winnipeg municipality (8236)		Upload Photo
MacKenzie Block	141 Bannatyne Avenue; Winnipeg MB	49°53′52″N 97°08′10″W	Winnipeg municipality (8244)		Upload Photo
Ashdown Store	211 Bannatyne Avenue; Winnipeg MB	49°53′53″N 97°08′23″W	Winnipeg municipality (8390)		
Massey Building	294 William Avenue; Winnipeg MB	49°53′57″N 97°08′28″W	Winnipeg municipality (8484)		Upload Photo
Bedford Building	281 McDermot Avenue; Winnipeg MB	49°53′52″N 97°08′30″W	Winnipeg municipality (8492)		Upload Photo
Hammond Building	63 Albert Street; Winnipeg MB	49°53′48″N 97°08′24″W	Winnipeg municipality (8574)		Upload Photo
Public Press Building	290 Vaughan Street; Winnipeg MB	49°53′32″N 97°09′01″W	Winnipeg municipality (8606)		Upload Photo
Sherbrook Pool	381 Sherbrook Street; Winnipeg MB	49°53′24″N 97°09′31″W	Winnipeg municipality (8643)		More images
Union Bank Building (Royal Bank Building)	504 Main Street; Winnipeg MB	49°53′56″N 97°08′23″W	Winnipeg municipality (8645)		
Imperial Bank of Canada	441 Main Street; Winnipeg MB	49°53′53″N 97°08′19″W	Winnipeg municipality (8660)		Upload Photo
Bank of British North America	436 Main Street; Winnipeg MB	49°53′48″N 97°08′21″W	Winnipeg municipality (8663)		Upload Photo
Union Bank Building Annex	500 Main Street; Winnipeg MB	49°53′55″N 97°08′22″W	Winnipeg municipality (8665)		More images
The Old Market Autonomous Zone	91 Albert Street; Winnipeg MB	49°53′51″N 97°08′24″W	Winnipeg municipality (8668)		
Marlborough Hotel	331 Smith Street; Winnipeg MB	49°53′42″N 97°08′33″W	Winnipeg municipality (8673)		Upload Photo
Albert Block	86 Albert Street; Winnipeg MB	49°53′51″N 97°08′26″W	Winnipeg municipality (8701)		
Gregg Building	52 Albert Street; Winnipeg MB	49°53′47″N 97°08′26″W	Winnipeg municipality (8741)		Upload Photo
Swiss Building	137 Bannatyne Avenue; Winnipeg MB	49°53′51″N 97°08′09″W	Winnipeg municipality (8742)		Upload Photo
Ambassador Apartments	379 Hargrave Street; Winnipeg MB	49°53′45″N 97°08′45″W	Winnipeg municipality (8743)		Upload Photo
T.W. Taylor Building	177 McDermot Avenue; Winnipeg MB	49°53′56″N 97°08′15″W	Winnipeg municipality (8800)		Upload Photo
Raleigh Apartments	340 Vaughan Street; Winnipeg MB	49°53′36″N 97°09′03″W	Winnipeg municipality (8808)		More images
Dominion Bank Building	678 Main Street; Winnipeg MB	49°54′15″N 97°08′07″W	Winnipeg municipality (8810)		
Portage Village Inn	311 Portage Avenue; Winnipeg MB	49°53′38″N 97°08′38″W	Winnipeg municipality (9027)		Upload Photo
Mitchell-Copp Building	315 Portage Avenue; Winnipeg MB	49°53′38″N 97°08′39″W	Winnipeg municipality (9029)		Upload Photo
Chamber of Commerce Building	177 Lombard Avenue; Winnipeg MB	49°53′47″N 97°08′15″W	Manitoba (9415), Winnipeg municipality (9401)		
Kilgour Block	181 Bannatyne Avenue; Winnipeg MB	49°53′54″N 97°08′16″W	Winnipeg municipality (9420)		Upload Photo
Dingwall Building	62 Albert Street; Winnipeg MB	49°53′48″N 97°08′26″W	Winnipeg municipality (9442)		Upload Photo
Early Skyscrapers in Winnipeg National Historic Site of Canada	191 Lombard Ave.; 395 Main St.; 457 Main Street; Winnipeg MB	49°53′47″N 97°08′18″W	Federal (10702)		More images
Robinson, Little and Company Building	54 Arthur Street; Winnipeg MB	49°53′48″N 97°08′30″W	Winnipeg municipality (11522)		Upload Photo
R.J. Whitla and Company Building	70 Arthur Street; Winnipeg MB	49°53′49″N 97°08′30″W	Winnipeg municipality (11523)		Upload Photo
Merchants Building	250 McDermot Avenue; Winnipeg MB	49°53′49″N 97°08′27″W	Winnipeg municipality (11536)		Upload Photo
Salvation Army Citadel	221 Rupert Avenue; Winnipeg MB	49°54′05″N 97°08′18″W	Winnipeg municipality (12049)		Upload Photo
Birt's Saddlery	468 Main Street; Winnipeg MB	49°53′52″N 97°08′22″W	Winnipeg municipality (12050)		
Great West Saddlery Building	113 Market Avenue; Winnipeg MB	49°53′54″N 97°08′05″W	Winnipeg municipality (12051)		More images
Electric Railway Chambers	213 Notre Dame Avenue; Winnipeg MB	49°53′44″N 97°08′25″W	Winnipeg municipality (12052)		More images
Great West Saddlery Warehouse	112-114 Market Avenue; Winnipeg MB	49°53′53″N 97°08′06″W	Winnipeg municipality (12053)		
Chatfield Distributors Building	168 Bannatyne Avenue; Winnipeg MB	49°53′51″N 97°08′15″W	Winnipeg municipality (12054)		Upload Photo
Royal Manitoba Theatre Centre National Historic Site of Canada	174 Market Avenue; Winnipeg MB	49°53′55″N 97°08′12″W	Federal (14667)		More images
Fort Garry Hotel National Historic Site of Canada	222 Broadway Avenue; Winnipeg MB	49°53′17″N 97°08′13″W	Federal (1190), Manitoba (5395), Winnipeg municipality (5383)		More images
Birks Building	276 Portage Avenue; Winnipeg MB	49°53′38″N 97°08′30″W	Winnipeg municipality (1535)		More images
Casa Loma Building	644 Portage Avenue; Winnipeg MB	49°53′18″N 97°09′31″W	Winnipeg municipality (1561)		Upload Photo
Oldfield, Kirby and Gardner Building	234 Portage Avenue; Winnipeg MB	49°53′41″N 97°08′24″W	Winnipeg municipality (2097)		
Metropolitan Theatre National Historic Site of Canada	291 Donald Street; Winnipeg MB	49°53′36″N 97°08′35″W	Federal (3110), Winnipeg municipality (7725)		More images
Dalnavert National Historic Site of Canada	61 Carlton Street; Winnipeg MB	49°53′11″N 97°08′33″W	Federal (3999), Manitoba (3995), Winnipeg municipality (8120)		More images
The Forks National Historic Site of Canada	45 Forks Market Road; Winnipeg MB	49°53′19″N 97°07′39″W	Federal (4488)		
Northern Pacific and Manitoba Railway Repair Shop	45 Forks Market Road; Winnipeg MB	49°53′15″N 97°07′41″W	Manitoba (4568)		
North West Commercial Travellers' Association Building	291 Garry Street; Winnipeg MB	49°53′38″N 97°08′25″W	Winnipeg municipality (5765)		
Carlton Building	354 Portage Avenue; Winnipeg MB	49°53′33″N 97°08′43″W	Winnipeg municipality (6168)		Upload Photo
Young United Church Tower	212 Furby Street; Winnipeg MB	49°53′08″N 97°09′29″W	Winnipeg municipality (6657)		
Canada Permanent Building	298 Garry Street; Winnipeg MB	49°53′38″N 97°08′27″W	Winnipeg municipality (6661)		
Gates at East Gate, West Gate, Middle Gate	Cornish Avenue; Winnipeg MB	49°52′44″N 97°09′30″W	Winnipeg municipality (6828)		Upload Photo
Garry Block	290 Garry Street; Winnipeg MB	49°53′37″N 97°08′28″W	Winnipeg municipality (6835)		Upload Photo
Ralph Connor House	54 West Gate; Winnipeg MB	49°53′55″N 97°08′12″W	Federal (15003), Manitoba (6289), Winnipeg municipality (6876)		More images
Cornish Library	20 West Gate; Winnipeg MB	49°52′42″N 97°09′36″W	Winnipeg municipality (6885)		
Upper Fort Garry Gate	130 Main Street; Winnipeg MB	49°53′17″N 97°08′07″W	Winnipeg municipality (6939)		More images
Bank of Hamilton	395 Main Street; Winnipeg MB	49°53′35″N 97°08′20″W	Winnipeg municipality (7345)		
Kerr House	351 Assiniboine Avenue; Winnipeg MB	49°53′06″N 97°08′23″W	Winnipeg municipality (7872)		Upload Photo
Johnston Terminal Building	45 Forks Market Road; Winnipeg MB	49°53′14″N 97°07′47″W	Winnipeg municipality (8195)		
Granite Curling Club	22 Mostyn Place; Winnipeg MB	49°52′57″N 97°09′02″W	Winnipeg municipality (8215)		More images
Glines House	55 Hargrave Street; Winnipeg MB	49°53′10″N 97°08′26″W	Winnipeg municipality (8578)		Upload Photo
H.E. Sharpe House	56 Balmoral Street; Winnipeg MB	49°52′59″N 97°09′11″W	Winnipeg municipality (9416)		Upload Photo
Princeton Apartments	314 Broadway; Winnipeg MB	49°53′14″N 97°08′27″W	Winnipeg municipality (9421)		Upload Photo
Winnipeg Law Courts National Historic Site of Canada	391 Broadway Avenue; Winnipeg MB	49°53′12″N 97°08′46″W	Federal (12789)		More images
Holy Trinity Anglican Church National Historic Site of Canada	269 Donald Street; Winnipeg MB	49°53′33″N 97°08′32″W	Federal (12894), Winnipeg municipality (11538)		More images
Forts Rouge, Garry and Gibraltar National Historic Site of Canada	Winnipeg MB	49°53′17″N 97°08′07″W	Federal (13312)		
St. Edward the Confessor Roman Catholic Church	836 Arlington Street; Winnipeg MB	49°54′09″N 97°10′07″W	Winnipeg municipality (5394)		Upload Photo
Principal Sparling School	1150 Sherburn Street; Winnipeg MB	49°54′16″N 97°10′30″W	Winnipeg municipality (5400)		Upload Photo
First Presbyterian Church	61 Picardy Place; Winnipeg MB	49°53′10″N 97°09′58″W	Manitoba (3856)		More images
Trappist Monastery Guest House	100 rue des Ruins de Monastere; Winnipeg MB	49°53′55″N 97°08′12″W	Manitoba (4164), Winnipeg municipality (6858)		
Laura Secord School	960 Wolseley Avenue; Winnipeg MB	49°52′44″N 97°10′21″W	Winnipeg municipality (5370)		Upload Photo
Rothesay Apartments	828 Preston Avenue; Winnipeg MB	49°53′02″N 97°10′04″W	Winnipeg municipality (6013)		More images
Wolseley School	511 Clifton Street; Winnipeg MB	49°52′52″N 97°11′09″W	Winnipeg municipality (6095)		Upload Photo
Westminster United Church	745 Westminster Avenue; Winnipeg MB	49°52′56″N 97°09′42″W	Manitoba (8150), Winnipeg municipality (7699)		
Moyse House	838 Wolseley Avenue; Winnipeg MB	49°52′44″N 97°09′58″W	Winnipeg municipality (8642)		Upload Photo
Thelma Apartments	272 Home Street; Winnipeg MB	49°53′06″N 97°10′07″W	Winnipeg municipality (8719)		Upload Photo
Bellcrest Apartments	72 Lenore Street; Winnipeg MB	49°52′47″N 97°10′20″W	Winnipeg municipality (9028)		Upload Photo
Silver Heights Gates	Mount Royal Road at Traill Avenue; Winnipeg MB	49°52′37″N 97°14′44″W	Winnipeg municipality (6829)		Upload Photo
Women's Tribute Memorial Lodge	200 Woodlawn Street; Winnipeg MB	49°52′39″N 97°14′05″W	Manitoba (8801), Winnipeg municipality (8549)		Upload Photo
William Brown House	3180 Portage Avenue; Winnipeg MB	49°52′50″N 97°17′18″W	Winnipeg municipality (8196)		Upload Photo
Roslyn Court Apartments National Historic Site of Canada	105 Roslyn Road / 40 Osborne Street; Winnipeg MB	49°52′49″N 97°08′48″W	Federal (1159), Winnipeg municipality (6910)		More images
Congress Apartments	300 River Avenue; Winnipeg MB	49°52′52″N 97°08′25″W	Winnipeg municipality (5847)		Upload Photo
St. Luke's Anglican Church	130 Nassau Street; Winnipeg MB	49°52′43″N 97°08′57″W	Manitoba (7718)		Upload Photo
Wardlow Apartments	544 Wardlaw Avenue; Winnipeg MB	49°52′31″N 97°08′52″W	Winnipeg municipality (7726)		Upload Photo
Lilly Apartments	6 Roslyn Road; Winnipeg MB	49°52′52″N 97°08′33″W	Winnipeg municipality (8129)		Upload Photo
DeBary Apartments	626 Wardlaw Avenue; Winnipeg MB	49°52′29″N 97°08′59″W	Winnipeg municipality (8221)		More images
J.C. Falls House	36 Roslyn Road; Winnipeg MB	49°52′51″N 97°08′38″W	Winnipeg municipality (8384)		Upload Photo
Nanton Estate Gates	229 Roslyn Road; Winnipeg MB	49°52′46″N 97°09′08″W	Winnipeg municipality (8461)		Upload Photo
John C. Graham House	137 Scott Street; Winnipeg MB	49°52′45″N 97°08′29″W	Winnipeg municipality (8586)		Upload Photo
Paterson Block	54 Donald Street; Winnipeg MB	49°53′10″N 97°08′23″W	Winnipeg municipality (8806)		Upload Photo
John Duncan McArthur House	159 Mayfair Avenue; Winnipeg MB	49°53′03″N 97°08′07″W	Winnipeg municipality (11539)		Upload Photo
Augustine United Church	444 River Avenue; Winnipeg MB	49°53′03″N 97°08′07″W	Winnipeg municipality (11817)		Upload Photo
Anvers Apartments	758 McMillan Avenue; Winnipeg MB	49°52′15″N 97°09′18″W	Winnipeg municipality (5589)		Upload Photo
Earl Grey School	340 Cockburn Street; Winnipeg MB	49°52′03″N 97°09′03″W	Winnipeg municipality (6047)		Upload Photo
Khartum Temple (J.H. Ashdown House)	529 Wellington Crescent; Winnipeg MB	49°52′36″N 97°09′41″W	Winnipeg municipality (6438)		More images
R.R. Scott House	29 Ruskin Row; Winnipeg MB	49°52′27″N 97°09′47″W	Winnipeg municipality (6886)		Upload Photo
St. Michael and All Angels Anglican Church	300 Hugo Street North; Winnipeg MB	49°52′10″N 97°08′57″W	Winnipeg municipality (7914)		Upload Photo
Pasadena Apartments	220 Hugo Street North; Winnipeg MB	49°52′21″N 97°09′06″W	Winnipeg municipality (8381)		Upload Photo
Fortune Residence	393 Wellington Crescent; Winnipeg MB	49°52′24″N 97°09′26″W	Winnipeg municipality (8700)		Upload Photo
No. 12 Firehall	1055 Dorchester Avenue; Winnipeg MB	49°52′03″N 97°10′10″W	Winnipeg municipality (12055)		Upload Photo
Uptown Theatre	394 Academy Road; Winnipeg MB	49°52′24″N 97°10′58″W	Winnipeg municipality (6046)		
Julia Clark School	615 Academy Road; Winnipeg MB	49°52′31″N 97°11′59″W	Winnipeg municipality (8132)		Upload Photo
Manitoba School for the Deaf	500 Shaftesbury Blvd. Winnipeg MB	49°53′55″N 97°08′12″W	Manitoba (5066)		Upload Photo
Assiniboine Park Pavilion	55 Pavilion Crescent; Winnipeg MB	49°52′20″N 97°13′48″W	Winnipeg municipality (8233)		More images
Caron House	50 Cass Street; Winnipeg MB	49°52′17″N 97°19′15″W	Winnipeg municipality (8213)		Upload Photo
La Chapelle de Notre-Dame-du-Bons-Secours	80, rue Pierre; Winnipeg MB	49°45′56″N 97°08′43″W	Manitoba (3552)		More images
Trappist Monastery Ruins	Winnipeg MB	49°45′24″N 97°09′14″W	Manitoba (6856)		More images
McDougall House	3514 Pembina Highway; Winnipeg MB	49°46′00″N 97°09′15″W	Winnipeg municipality (8058)		Upload Photo
Pembina Highway House	3514 Pembina Highway; Winnipeg MB	49°46′00″N 97°09′14″W	Winnipeg municipality (8059)		More images
Customs Examining Warehouse	Winnipeg MB	49°53′49″N 97°08′10″W	Federal (3616)		
Postal Station "B"	1048 Main Street; Winnipeg MB	49°54′50″N 97°07′55″W	Federal (3618)		Upload Photo
Stanley Knowles / Revenue Building	391 York Avenue; Winnipeg MB	49°53′18″N 97°08′44″W	Federal (4144)		Upload Photo
Minto Armoury	St. Matthews Street; Winnipeg MB	49°53′27″N 97°10′44″W	Federal (4343)		
Building 84	17 Wing; Winnipeg MB	49°53′35″N 97°14′56″W	Federal (9584)		Upload Photo
Building 86	Winnipeg MB	49°53′39″N 97°14′57″W	Federal (9621)		Upload Photo
B8-Drill Hall (Korea Hall)	1984 Grant Avenue; Winnipeg MB	49°51′12″N 97°12′35″W	Federal (11496)		Upload Photo
Hangar 16	16 East Street, CFB Winnipeg; Winnipeg MB	49°53′44″N 97°14′46″W	Federal (12960)		Upload Photo
Hangar 11	11 East Street, CFB Winnipeg; Winnipeg MB	49°53′44″N 97°14′46″W	Federal (12963)		Upload Photo
Hangar 10	10 East Street, CFB Winnipeg; Winnipeg MB	49°53′51″N 97°14′56″W	Federal (12961)		Upload Photo
Commander's Residence	205 Dromore Avenue; Winnipeg MB	49°52′22″N 97°10′11″W	Federal (13394)		Upload Photo
Manitoba Legislative Building	450 Broadway; Winnipeg MB	49°53′55″N 97°08′12″W	Manitoba (15362)		
Smart Bag Company Building	145 Pacific Avenue; Winnipeg MB	49°54′03″N 97°08′04″W	Winnipeg municipality (15838)		Upload Photo
Battle of Seven Oaks National Historic Site of Canada	Winnipeg MB	49°55′53″N 97°07′15″W	Federal (16005)		More images
Maison Gabrielle-Roy National Historic Site of Canada	375 Deschambault Street; Winnipeg MB	49°53′24″N 97°06′36″W	Federal (16342), Manitoba (8694), Winnipeg municipality (8698)		More images
Hample Building	271-273 1/2 Portage Avenue; Winnipeg MB	49°53′41″N 97°08′32″W	Winnipeg municipality (16349)		Upload Photo
Federal Building	269 Main Street; Winnipeg MB	49°53′37″N 97°08′14″W	Federal (2967)		
Knox United Church	400 Edmonton Street; Winnipeg MB	49°53′45″N 97°08′56″W	Manitoba (4294)		Upload Photo
Old St. James Anglican Church	540 Tylehurst Street; Winnipeg MB	49°52′48″N 97°11′58″W	Manitoba (4509)		Upload Photo
Free Press Building	300 Carlton Street; Winnipeg MB	49°53′37″N 97°08′47″W	Winnipeg municipality (5926)		Upload Photo
Bank of Commerce	389 Main Street; Winnipeg MB	49°53′48″N 97°08′19″W	Winnipeg municipality (5949)		Upload Photo
Former Canadian Northern Railway Station	Inkster Blvd. and Prairie Dog Trail; Winnipeg MB	49°57′06″N 97°16′12″W	Winnipeg municipality (6550)		
Calvary Temple Tower	400 Hargrave Street; Winnipeg MB	49°53′48″N 97°08′46″W	Winnipeg municipality (6580)		Upload Photo
Royal Bank of Canada Building	460 Main Street; Winnipeg MB	49°53′51″N 97°08′21″W	Winnipeg municipality (6660)		Upload Photo
Ross House Museum	140 Meade Street North; Winnipeg MB	49°54′25″N 97°07′45″W	Winnipeg municipality (6667)		
Marshall-Wells Building	136 Market Avenue; Winnipeg MB	49°53′55″N 97°08′09″W	Winnipeg municipality (6837)		Upload Photo
Carnegie Library	380 Wiliam Avenue; Winnipeg MB	49°54′03″N 97°08′42″W	Winnipeg municipality (6904)		Upload Photo
Transcona Municipal Offices	141 Regent Avenue West; Winnipeg MB	49°53′42″N 97°00′19″W	Winnipeg municipality (7701)		Upload Photo
J.B. Monk Residence	134 West Gate; Winnipeg MB	49°52′32″N 97°09′24″W	Winnipeg municipality (7703)		Upload Photo
Aikins House	630 Westminster Avenue; Winnipeg MB	49°52′54″N 97°09′22″W	Winnipeg municipality (7705)		Upload Photo
Bank of Montreal	426 Portage Avenue; Winnipeg MB	49°53′29″N 97°08′56″W	Winnipeg municipality (7916)		Upload Photo
Sir Sam Steele School	15 Chester Street; Winnipeg MB	49°54′07″N 97°05′13″W	Winnipeg municipality (7916)		Upload Photo
Macdonald Shoe Store	490 Main Street; Winnipeg MB	49°53′52″N 97°08′21″W	Winnipeg municipality (8454)		Upload Photo
Bate Building	221 McDermot Avenue; Winnipeg MB	49°53′50″N 97°08′24″W	Winnipeg municipality (8491)		Upload Photo
Bank of Montreal	335 Main Street; Winnipeg MB	49°53′42″N 97°08′17″W	Winnipeg municipality (8611)		Upload Photo
Klinic Building	545 Broadway; Winnipeg MB	49°53′08″N 97°09′06″W	Winnipeg municipality (8667)		Upload Photo
J.W. Harris House	26 Edmonton Street; Winnipeg MB	49°53′05″N 97°08′34″W	Winnipeg municipality (8702)		Upload Photo
Merchants Bank	1386 Main Street; Winnipeg MB	49°55′30″N 97°07′32″W	Winnipeg municipality (8740)		Upload Photo
Travellers Building	283 Bannatyne Avenue; Winnipeg MB	49°53′54″N 97°08′29″W	Winnipeg municipality (8744)		
McGregor Street Armoury	515 Machray Avenue; Winnipeg MB	49°55′38″N 97°08′22″W	Federal (9558)		Upload Photo
Building 21	CFB Winnipeg; Winnipeg MB	49°53′31″N 97°14′11″W	Federal (9558)		Upload Photo

== See also ==
- List of historic places in Manitoba
- List of National Historic Sites of Canada in Manitoba
