= List of historic places in the Central Plains Region =

This is a list of historic places in Central Plains Region, Manitoba entered on the Canadian Register of Historic Places, whether they are federal, provincial, or municipal.

== List of historic places ==
Name	Address	Coordinates	Government recognition (CRHP №)	Wikidata ID	Image
Fannystelle School	Grey MB	49°44′42″N 97°46′39″W	Grey municipality (6589)		Upload Photo
Convent of the Sisters of the Holy Names of Jesus and Mary	432 Joubert Street North; St. Jean Baptiste MB	49°26′42″N 96°59′31″W	Manitoba (3857)		Upload Photo
Sacred Heart of Jesus Roman Catholic Church	37 Church Avenue; Grey MB	49°44′44″N 97°46′48″W	Grey municipality (8495)		
Grace Evangelical Lutheran Church	408 Main Street; Lakeview MB	50°23′04″N 98°40′32″W	Lakeview municipality (6756)		Upload Photo
Moffatt Barn	Lakeview MB	50°15′05″N 98°43′42″W	Lakeview municipality (8156)		Upload Photo
Arden Mound and Camp Site	Lansdowne MB	50°14′00″N 96°15′15″W	Manitoba (6974)		Upload Photo
Tenby School	Main Street; Lansdowne MB	50°30′03″N 99°07′58″W	Lansdowne municipality (5774)		Upload Photo
Scott House	Lansdowne MB	50°24′37″N 99°21′18″W	Lansdowne municipality (7013)		Upload Photo
Austin Elevator	Manitoba Agricultural Museum, Provincial Highway 34; North Norfolk MB	49°55′31″N 98°56′48″W	North Norfolk municipality (20205)		
MacGregor Canadian Pacific Railway Water Tower	Manitoba Agricultural Museum, Provincial Highway 34; North Norfolk MB	49°55′31″N 98°56′45″W	North Norfolk municipality (20206)		
Holland Emmanuel Historical Church	114 Barr Street; Victoria MB	49°35′46″N 98°52′52″W	Victoria municipality (19369)		
Mahon Home	Victoria MB	49°35′42″N 98°58′50″W	Victoria municipality (6480)		Upload Photo
Young House	SW 27-7-12 W Victoria MB	49°35′29″N 99°01′30″W	Victoria municipality (5773)		Upload Photo
Qually Brothers Store	48 Qually Road; Cartier MB	49°53′N 97°38′W	Cartier municipality (9953)		Upload Photo
St. Paul's Anglican Church	4813 PTH 26; St. François Xavier MB	50°02′59″N 97°50′13″W	St. François Xavier municipality (2735)		Upload Photo
Warkentin Blacksmith Shop	2172 PTH 26; St. François Xavier MB	49°57′50″N 97°37′42″W	St. François Xavier municipality (2739)		Upload Photo
Grey Nuns' Convent	1060 Highway 26; Cartier MB	49°54′45″N 97°32′21″W	Cartier municipality (3885)		Upload Photo
Galloway Bros Department Store	37 Morris Avenue; Gladstone MB	50°13′42″N 98°57′00″W	Manitoba (3490)		Upload Photo
Smith/Arthur Farm Elevator	Gladstone MB	50°13′19″N 98°58′31″W	Gladstone municipality (6892)		Upload Photo
Taylor House	102 1st Street SW; Portage la Prairie MB	49°34′52″N 98°10′25″W	Portage la Prairie municipality (4505)		Upload Photo
Portage la Prairie Canadian Pacific Railway Station	301 3rd Street NE; Portage la Prairie MB	49°35′04″N 98°10′36″W	Federal (4556, (15788), Portage la Prairie municipality (4506)		
Poplar Point and District Memorial Rink	39 Aspen Drive; Portage la Prairie MB	50°01′54″N 97°35′02″W	Portage la Prairie municipality (4900)		Upload Photo
St. Anne's Anglican Church	Portage la Prairie MB	50°02′33″N 98°01′27″W	Manitoba (5398), Portage la Prairie municipality (5399)		Upload Photo
Flee Island Dakota Entrenchment	Portage la Prairie MB	50°03′36″N 98°05′25″W	Manitoba (7303)		More images
St. Ambroise Dakota Entrenchment	Portage la Prairie MB	50°08′N 98°02′W	Manitoba (7304)		Upload Photo
Macdonald Pioneer Cemetery	Portage la Prairie MB	50°03′48″N 98°28′09″W	Portage la Prairie municipality (7754)		Upload Photo
St. Mary's la Prairie Anglican Church	36 Second Street SW; Portage la Prairie MB	49°58′21″N 98°17′36″W	Manitoba (4297)		Upload Photo
Portage la Prairie Dominion Post Office	97 Saskatchewan Avenue; Portage la Prairie MB	49°58′21″N 98°17′11″W	Portage la Prairie municipality (5485)		
Portage la Prairie Land Titles Building	103 3rd Street NE; Portage la Prairie MB	49°58′27″N 98°17′06″W	Manitoba (5848)		Upload Photo
Portage la Prairie Public Building National Historic Site of Canada	55 Saskatchewan Avenue West; Portage la Prairie MB	49°58′22″N 98°17′30″W	Federal (7543)		More images
McCowan House	39 2nd Street SW; Portage la Prairie MB	49°58′11″N 98°17′36″W	Portage la Prairie municipality (8848)		Upload Photo
First Homestead in Western Canada National Historic Site of Canada	Highway 240, 1 mile north of Hwy 249 junction Portage la Prairie MB	50°03′45″N 98°17′08″W	Federal (17541)		Upload Photo
Fort La Reine National Historic Site of Canada	130 Yellowquill Trail; Portage la Prairie MB	49°57′04″N 98°19′38″W	Federal (17947)		More images
Portage la Prairie Armoury	143 Second Street; Portage la Prairie MB	49°58′34″N 98°17′35″W	Federal (9512)		Upload Photo
Hill's Drug Store	200 Saskatchewan Avenue East; Portage la Prairie MB	49°35′N 98°10′W	Portage la Prairie municipality (16350)		Upload Photo
Saint-Claude Gaol Museum	5 Provincial Road & 240 N. St. Claude MB	49°39′54″N 98°20′42″W	St. Claude municipality (6429)		Upload Photo
Treherne United Church	186 Boyne Street; Treherne MB	49°37′41″N 98°41′50″W	Treherne municipality (6735)		Upload Photo

== See also ==
- List of historic places in Manitoba
- List of National Historic Sites of Canada in Manitoba
