= Manitoba Provincial Road 432 =

Provincial road in Manitoba, Canada

Provincial Road 432

Route information
- Maintained by Department of Infrastructure
- Length: 37.1 km (23.1 mi)
- Existed: 1966–present

Major junctions
- South end: PR 201 near Osterwick
- PTH 3 in Morden
- North end: PTH 23 in Rosebank

Location
- Country: Canada
- Province: Manitoba
- Rural municipalities: Stanley, Thompson
- Major cities: Morden

Highway system
- Provincial highways in Manitoba; Winnipeg City Routes
← PR 430	→ PR 433

Provincial Road 432 (PR 432) is a 37.1-kilometre-long (23.1 mi) north–south highway in the Pembina Valley Region of Manitoba, connecting the town of Rosebank with the city of Morden, as well as rural areas to the south near the United States border.

== Route description ==
PR 432 begins in the Rural Municipality of Stanley at a junction with PR 201 between Pembina Valley Provincial Park and Osterwick, meandering northeast as a two-lane gravel road through farmland while traversing several creeks and switchbacks. Becoming paved, the highway follows the eastern coastline of Lake Minnewasta as it enters the city of Morden along Willcocks Road. After joining Mountain Street via a sharp left hand curve, PR 432 travels through neighbourhoods and an industrial area on the west side of downtown, crossing a railway to enter a business district and have an intersection with PTH 3 (Boundary Commission Trail / Thornhill Street). It travels through several more blocks of neighbourhoods before leaving Morden and heading north through rural farmland for the next several kilometres. The highway enters the Rural Municipality of Thompson, traversing more rural areas before entering the town of Rosebank and coming to an end at an intersection with PTH 23.

== Major intersections ==
Division	Location	km	mi	Destinations	Notes
Stanley		0.0	0.0	PR 201 – Osterwick, Windygates	Southern terminus
Stanley		8.3	5.2	Pavement begins	
City of Morden		17.4	10.8	PTH 3 (Thornhill Street / Boundary Commission Trail) – Winkler, Manitou	
Stanley	No major junctions				
Thompson	Rosebank	37.1	23.1	PTH 23 – Miami, Roland; Road 29W – Rosebank	Northern terminus; road continues north as Road 29W
1.000 mi = 1.609 km; 1.000 km = 0.621 mi
