= List of historic places in Eastman Region, Manitoba =

This is a list of historic places in Eastman Region, Manitoba entered on the Canadian Register of Historic Places, whether they are federal, provincial, or municipal.

== List of historic places ==
Name	Address	Coordinates	Government recognition (CRHP №)	Wikidata ID	Image
Concrete Box Bridge	Franklin MB	49°10′04″N 96°57′57″W	Franklin municipality (6359)		Upload Photo
Concrete Box Bridge	Franklin MB	49°09′47″N 96°55′15″W	Franklin municipality (6420)		Upload Photo
Senkiw School Suspension Bridge	Franklin MB	49°11′56″N 96°52′56″W	Franklin municipality (6376)		
Fredensthal Lutheran Cemeteries	Franklin MB	49°01′05″N 97°02′42″W	Franklin municipality (7913)		Upload Photo
All Saints Anglican Church	48 Centennial Drive; Franklin MB	49°08′25″N 97°09′20″W	Franklin municipality (6323)		Upload Photo
Arnaud United Church and Cemetery	Main Street East; Franklin MB	49°15′33″N 97°06′03″W	Franklin municipality (8057)		Upload Photo
Dominion City Cemetery	Franklin MB	49°08′34″N 97°08′46″W	Franklin municipality (8139)		Upload Photo
Green Ridge Cemetery	Franklin MB	49°05′16″N 97°00′23″W	Franklin municipality (8151)		Upload Photo
Overstoneville Independent Cemetery	Franklin MB	50°58′11″N 96°56′10″W	Franklin municipality (6434)		Upload Photo
St. Andrews United Church	Garson MB	50°04′34″N 96°42′20″W	Garson municipality (4173)		Upload Photo
Willow Plain School	SE 20-5-6 E Hanover MB	49°23′58″N 96°44′39″W	Hanover municipality (2764)		Upload Photo
St. Joachim Roman Catholic Church	107 rue Principale; La Broquerie MB	49°32′N 96°32′W	La Broquerie municipality (4109)		Upload Photo
St. Elias Ukrainian Orthodox Church and Bell Tower	Piney MB	49°00′55″N 96°15′04″W	Manitoba (7335)		Upload Photo
Christ Anglican Church	Provincial Highway 11; Powerview MB	50°35′32″N 96°16′25″W	Manitoba (15881)		Upload Photo
Elma Pool Hall and Residence	67159 Railway Avenue (Highway 15); Whitemouth MB	49°52′10″N 95°54′33″W	Whitemouth municipality (7706)		Upload Photo
St. Michael's Ukrainian Greek Orthodox Church	NW 28-1-6E; Stuartburn MB	49°04′16″N 96°44′24″W	Manitoba (3762)		Upload Photo
Sts. Peter and Paul Ukrainian Orthodox Church	PR 201 and Sundown Road North; Stuartburn MB	49°06′17″N 96°16′13″W	Stuartburn municipality (14528)		Upload Photo
Gardenton Truss Bridge	Stuartburn MB	49°05′16″N 96°41′08″W	Stuartburn municipality (6816)		Upload Photo
New St. Elias Ukrainian Orthodox Church and Bell Tower	Stuartburn MB	49°00′57″N 96°15′02″W	Manitoba (8389)		Upload Photo
St. Michael's Ukrainian Greek Orthodox Church National Historic Site of Canada	Stuartburn MB	49°04′38″N 96°41′38″W	Federal (12762)		Upload Photo
Spurgrave School	Piney MB	49°13′36″N 95°59′31″W	Piney municipality (5115)		Upload Photo
Bell Tower of the Ukrainian Catholic Church of St. Michael the Archangel	Brokenhead MB	50°04′37″N 96°39′23″W	Brokenhead municipality (5599)		Upload Photo
Sts. Peter and Paul Ukrainian Orthodox Church	Pierson Drive, Tyndall; Brokenhead MB	50°05′26″N 96°39′29″W	Brokenhead municipality (16374)		Upload Photo
Midwinter School	Reynolds MB	49°37′19″N 95°36′44″W	Reynolds municipality (6171)		Upload Photo
Gabel's General Store	Brokenhead MB	50°10′50″N 96°29′46″W	Manitoba (6590)		Upload Photo
Ukrainian Catholic Church of the Immaculate Conception National Historic Site of Canada	Springfield MB	50°00′17″N 96°46′23″W	Federal (13013), Manitoba (5391), Springfield municipality (6674)		
Speer House	Springfield MB	49°56′51″N 96°53′59″W	Springfield municipality (5440)		Upload Photo
Monseigneur Tache Historic Site	Main Street North; Tache MB	49°44′42″N 96°31′31″W	Tache municipality (4110)		Upload Photo
Manitoba Glass Company Site	James Avenue; Beausejour MB	50°01′57″N 96°18′51″W	Manitoba (6745)		Upload Photo
Lecoy House	Amy's Cove; Lac du Bonnet MB	50°17′28″N 95°59′25″W	Lac du Bonnet municipality (8050)		Upload Photo
Erickson Cabin	Lac du Bonnet MB	50°16′02″N 96°01′00″W	Lac du Bonnet municipality (8316)		Upload Photo
Riverland School	Lac du Bonnet MB	50°15′07″N 95°58′47″W	Lac du Bonnet municipality (14503)		Upload Photo
Historic église de l'Enfant-Jésus	Ste. Anne MB	49°36′00″N 96°24′00″W	Ste. Anne municipality (10549)		Upload Photo
Piney Road Bridge	Finnigan Road; Ste. Anne MB	49°39′39″N 96°38′11″W	Ste. Anne municipality (4111)		Upload Photo
Ste. Anne Roman Catholic Church	162 avenue Centrale; Ste. Anne MB	49°40′02″N 96°38′45″W	Ste. Anne municipality (7651)		Upload Photo
Goulet House	432 Joubert Street; St-Pierre-Jolys MB	49°26′44″N 96°59′30″W	St-Pierre-Jolys municipality (4897)		Upload Photo
Friesen House	255 Hanover Street; Steinbach MB	49°31′40″N 96°41′08″W	Steinbach municipality (5436)		Upload Photo

== See also ==
- List of historic places in Manitoba
- List of National Historic Sites of Canada in Manitoba
