= Les Pavelick =

Canadian comedian and entertainer

- Born: Leslie Joseph Paul Pavelick; Saskatchewan, Canada
- Died: January 22, 2013; Yuma, Arizona, U.S.
- Occupations: Comedian, entertainer
- Known for: Creating and performing as Metro

Comedy career
- Years active: Late 1960s–2013

Leslie Joseph Paul Pavelick, professionally known as Metro, was a Canadian comedian and entertainer known for his musical comedy and humorous portrayals of Prairie and Ukrainian-Canadian life. Based in Regina, Saskatchewan, Pavelick created the Metro character in the late 1960s. His best-known recording, 11 Days From Christmas, was released in 1975, has sold more than 50,000 copies, and earned him a Canadian gold record.

Over more than four decades, Pavelick performed throughout Canada and the United States.

== Career ==
=== Early career and creation of Metro ===
Pavelick worked in radio advertising sales and marketing in Regina before becoming known as a comedian. He developed the Metro character in the late 1960s, performing an exaggerated, accented Prairie personality at dinners and trade shows. The character eventually appeared on television across Western Canada.

Metro's comedy drew on rural Saskatchewan life, particularly the experiences, language, and traditions associated with Ukrainian Canadian communities. His performances combined comic monologues, music, wordplay, and parodies of familiar songs. The character was presented as a rural Ukrainian immigrant, with exaggerated speech and stories involving farming, family life and Prairie culture.

Folklorist Robert B. Klymasz discussed Metro, alongside fellow comedian Nestor Pistor, as part of the development of Ukrainian Canadian commercial recordings in Western Canada.

=== "11 Days From Christmas" ===
Pavelick's best-known work originated in 1974, when he and radio broadcaster Neil Headrick, who performed under the name Jacques Straper, recorded a humorous Christmas song called "11 Days From Christmas". The pair wrote the song together after a night out and recorded a demo version at a radio station the following day. They had initially made the recording for their own amusement, but it subsequently became popular.

The original recording was later revised and re-recorded by Pavelick as a solo performance for his 1975 album, Metro's 11 Days From Christmas. The album featured parodies of well-known Christmas songs, including Walkin' in my Winter Underwear and Chesnik Roasting on an Open Fire.

The record sold more than 50,000 copies and earned Pavelick a Canadian gold record. Its popularity helped establish the song as a recognizable part of Saskatchewan's Ukrainian Christmas traditions. The recording continues to be played and remembered decades after its release.

=== Further recordings and performances ===
Pavelick recorded additional comedy albums following the success of 11 Days From Christmas. Metro on Broadway was his second long-playing record.

In 1978, Pavelick was regularly promoting his Royalty Records recordings. Sales of his albums had exceeded 35,000 copies and Royalty released a new album, Metro Goes Country, in response to demands from his audience.

Pavelick continued recording and performing for many years. He also entertained Canadian troops on overseas United Nations peacekeeping tours. In the 1970s, he participated in a six-week Christmas show tour that included stops in Canada, Germany, Cyprus, Israel and Egypt.

Pavelick also continued performing shows and participating in fundraising events in Canada and Arizona until shortly before his death. His catalogue also features a book, Standing Ovulation.

== Reception and controversy ==
Metro's humour was rooted in the use of an exaggerated Ukrainian immigrant persona, including caricatured speech patterns and jokes about Ukrainian customs and rural life. Although the character found an audience in the Canadian Prairies, the material also attracted criticism.

An article in New Breed, the Association of Métis and Non-Status Indians of Saskatchewan's magazine, included an article discussing Pavelick's ethnic humour and reported objections from Ukrainian community organizations and students in Saskatoon, who believed that his portrayal of Ukrainians was demeaning to their community and their ancestors.

== Charitable work ==
In addition to his entertainment career, Pavelick was involved in charitable fundraising throughout Saskatchewan. His performances frequently combined comedy with fundraising for local charities and service organizations.

According to a statement delivered in the House of Commons in 2013, Pavelick had helped raise more than $1 million for charities and service groups in Saskatchewan.

== Death and legacy ==
Pavelick died of a heart attack at his home in Yuma, Arizona, on January 22, 2013. He had a wife, Barbara.

On January 30, 2013, Brad Trost, the Conservative member of Parliament for Saskatoon—Humboldt, delivered a statement in the House of Commons recognizing Pavelick's contribution to Saskatchewan entertainment. Trost referred to him as a “Saskatchewan original” and described the Metro character as an expression of a Prairie culture that was gradually disappearing. He specifically recognized the popularity of 11 Days From Christmas, Pavelick's performances for Canadian troops and his charitable fundraising.

The song 11 Days From Christmas has continues to be associated with Ukrainian Christmas celebrations in Saskatchewan.

== Discography ==
=== Selected albums ===
Year	Album	Notes
1975	Metro's 11 Days From Christmas	His best-known recording; achieved Canadian gold certification.
1976	Metro On Broadway	
1978	Metro Goes Country	
2004	Metro Live	With Special Guest Jake Kluk
2012	Metros Next... Too Last... Xmas Album	
2012	Metros Rural and Wastern Album	
