= Sam Waller Museum =

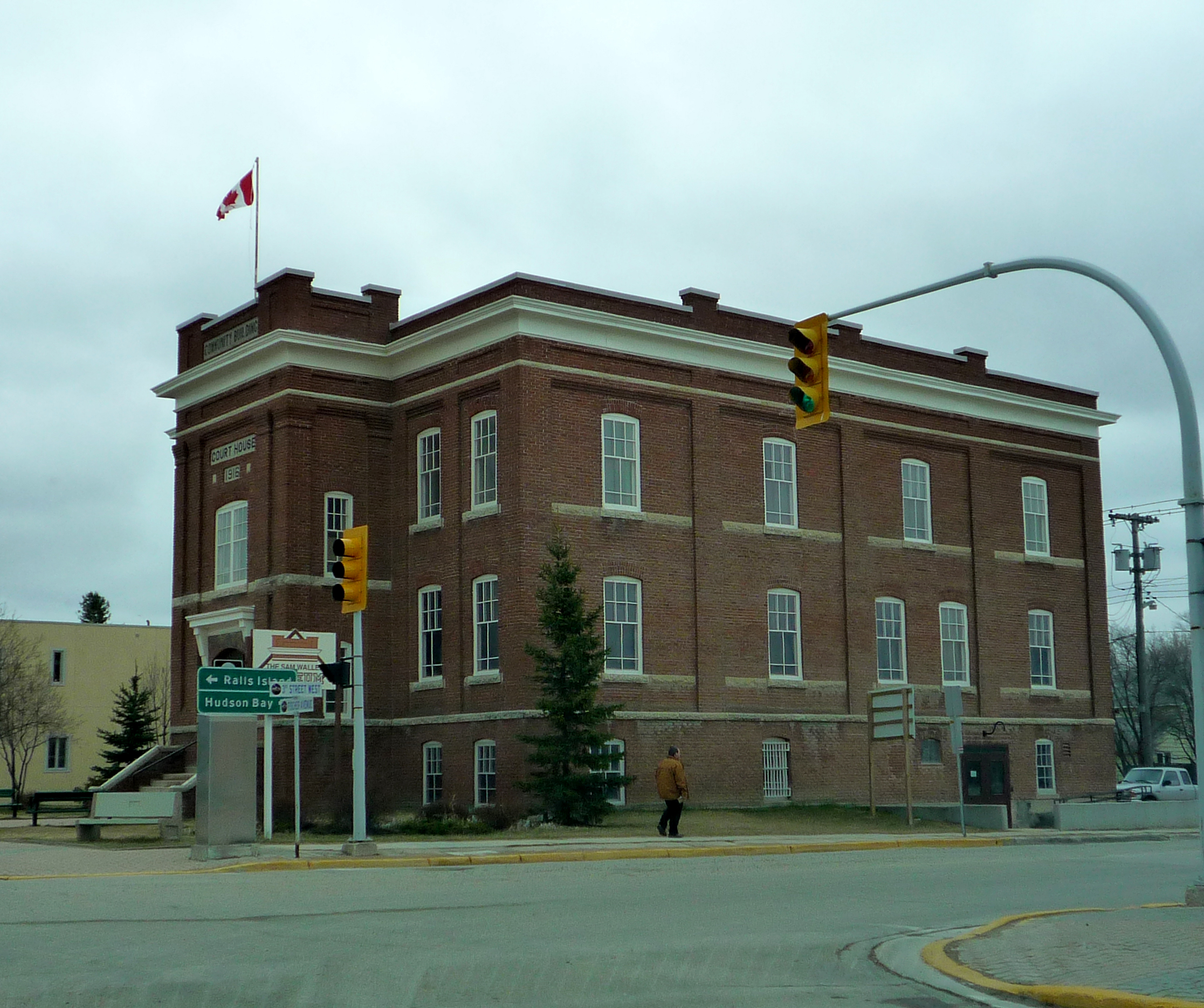
- Location: The Pas, Manitoba
- Coordinates: 53.8232°N 101.2523°W
- Type: History museum
- Director: Jaxon Baker
- Chairperson: Keith Hyde (chair) John Chartrand (vice-chair)
- Website: samwallermuseum.ca
- Building details

General information
- Construction started: 1916
- Completed: 1917

Design and construction
- Architect: George Nelson Taylor
- Main contractor: Snyder Brothers

The Sam Waller Museum is a museum in The Pas, Manitoba, dedicated to preserving the history (natural and human) and artifacts of The Pas region of northern Manitoba.

Its collections feature and build off of those of founder Sam Waller (1894-1978), including history related to First Nations, fur trading, mining, transportation (from the steamboat to the railway and aviation era). The museum also highlights some past and present community events, most notably the annual Northern Manitoba Trappers' Festival.

The museum is located in the former Community Building and Court House in downtown The Pas, which was built in 1916 and is now a provincial-designated heritage building. Travel Manitoba has designated the Sam Waller Museum as a Manitoba "Star Attraction" since December 2004, joining Pisew Falls and the Town of Churchill as one of only three such designated attractions in the north.

== Sam Waller ==
Samuel "Sam" Waller (June 23, 1894 – March 19, 1978) was an English-Canadian educator, naturalist, taxidermist, and museum curator.

Waller was born at Eye, Suffolk, England, in 1894 to father Samuel Waller Sr.

After coming to Canada, he enlisted in the Canadian Expeditionary Force in 1915. He served with the 139th Battalion, receiving the Military Medal for Bravery during the Last Hundred Days of World War I. Following his military discharge, he returned to Canada and taught school in Moose Factory, northern Ontario, as well as in the Interlake Region of Manitoba at various Indigenous schools. He would later go on to work at the federal Department of Indian Affairs.

In 1958, following his retirement from the government, Waller established the Little Northern Museum in The Pas, which he gifted to the town in 1970. In recognition of his community service, he was honoured with a Manitoba Golden Boy Award (1961) and a Manitoba Centennial Medal from the Manitoba Historical Society (1970). In 1974, he was made an honorary member of the Manitoba Naturalists Society.

On 19 March 1978, Waller died unmarried in The Pas, and was buried in the St. Michael’s and All Angels Cemetery.

== Museum history ==
The Little Northern Museum (now Sam Waller Museum) was founded by educator and curator Sam Waller in the 1950s.

Following his retirement from teaching in 1958, Waller acquired a pair of small bunkhouses from The Pas Lumber Company and joined them together on a Gordon Avenue property to house his first "Little Northern Museum". He lived on-site, and the museum was often open seven days a week from 9:00 a.m. to 9:00 p.m.

As the museum's growing collection eventually outgrew the original building, the local Rotary Club constructed a larger building to house the museum in 1970. That year, Waller gifted the museum to the Town of The Pas, and it developed into the Sam Waller Museum.

In 1982, The Pas Court House and Community Building in downtown was closed after new court facilities opened. The municipal government thereafter acquired the building from the provincial government to house the Sam Waller Museum. The building, which is the oldest standing brick building in northern Manitoba, was renovated into a purpose-designed, climate controlled museum building. It is now a provincial-designated heritage site.

== See also ==
- List of museums in Manitoba
