= Rosebank =

Rosebank may refer to:

== Places ==
=== Australia ===
- Rosebank, New South Wales

=== Canada ===
- Rosebank, Manitoba

=== New Zealand ===
- Rosebank Peninsula

=== South Africa ===
- Rosebank, Cape Town
- Rosebank, Gauteng

=== United Kingdom ===
- Rosebank, South Lanarkshire, Scotland

=== United States ===
- Rosebank, Staten Island, New York

== Train stations ==
- Rosebank railway station, in Cape Town, South Africa
- Rosebank (Gautrain station) in Gauteng, South Africa
- Rosebank (Staten Island Railway station), in New York, abandoned

== Other uses ==
- Rosebank College, in Sydney, Australia
- Rosebank distillery in Scotland
- Rosebank oil and gas field, west of Shetland
