= List of historic places in Manitoba =

This article is a list of historic places in the province of Manitoba entered on the Canadian Register of Historic Places, whether they are federal, provincial, or municipal. The listings are divided by region. See the following lists:

- Winnipeg (city only)
- Central Plains Region
- Eastman Region
- Interlake Region
- Northern Region
- Parkland Region
- Pembina Valley Region
- Westman Region

== See also ==
- List of National Historic Sites of Canada in Manitoba
