= Robert Klymasz =

Ukrainian-Canadian folklorist

Robert Bohdan Klymasz (born May 14, 1936, Toronto, Canada and died March 17, 2024, Winnipeg) was a Ukrainian-Canadian folklorist. He was a pioneer in the field and published widely in the English language.

Educated at the University of Toronto (Russian, 1957) under George Luckyj, the University of Manitoba (MA in Slavic Studies, under Jaroslav Rudnyckyj, 1960), Harvard University (1960–62), and Indiana University Bloomington (PhD in Folklore Studies, 1971), he was a long-time Curator of the Slavic and East European Program at the Canadian Museum of Civilization, Ottawa. He has taught at several North American universities, served as executive director of the Ukrainian Cultural and Educational Centre, Winnipeg (1976–78), and for several years an adjunct professor at the Centre for Ukrainian Canadian Studies, University of Manitoba.

During the 1950s, at the suggestion of Jaroslav Rudnyckyj, Klymasz undertook a research trip to communist Czechoslovakia and the Soviet Union, specifically western Ukraine, to expand his knowledge of Slavonic studies and do first-hand work in the field. This was a relatively rare event for a Ukrainian Canadian scholar during the Cold War.

During the early 1960s, Klymasz traversed the Canadian prairies recording the folksongs and gathering other materials concerning the early pioneer Ukrainian immigration to Canada. These elderly immigrants and their descendants provided him with a wealth of material with which he was able to construct a portrait of Ukrainian-Canadian folk culture, especially rural culture, as it then existed. Most of these materials are today preserved in archives in Edmonton, Alberta, and Winnipeg, Manitoba and remain valuable resources for contemporary folklorists.

Klymasz's major published works consist of studies in Slavic-Canadian onomastics, and Ukrainian-Canadian folklore, including the groundbreaking Introduction to the Ukrainian-Canadian Immigrant Folksong Cycle (1970), The Ukrainian Winter Folksong Cycle in Canada (1970), and the comprehensive Ukrainian Folklore in Canada (1980). His other contributions to scholarship include studies of subjects as varied as ethnic jokes, Ukrainian-Canadian pictorial art and icons, stories, and various musical genres.
