= Deerwood, Manitoba =

Deerwood
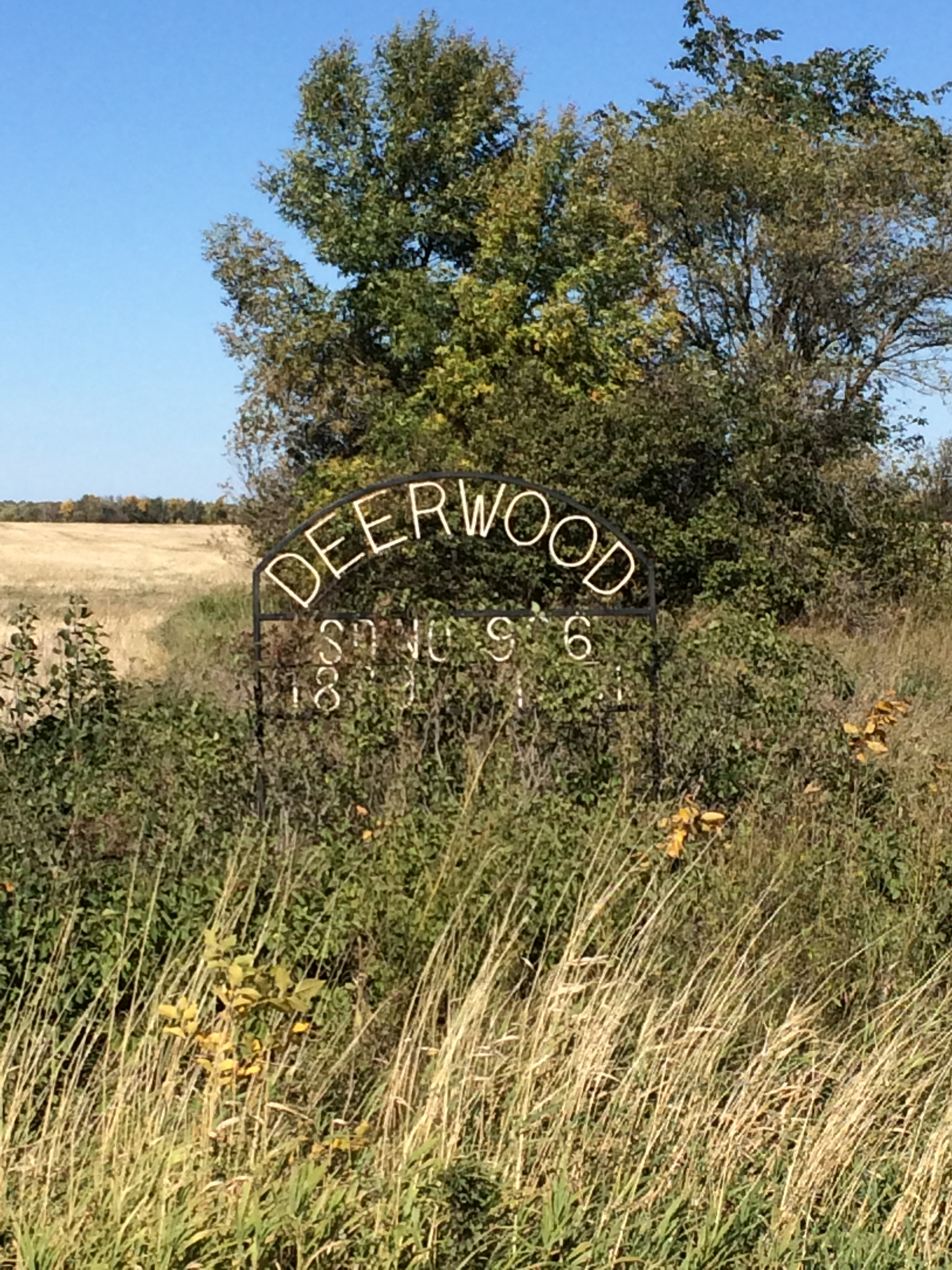
- Monument Commemorating Deerwood School District Number 926

- Location of Deerwood in Manitoba
- Coordinates: 49°23′52″N 98°23′11″W
- Country: Canada
- Province: Manitoba
- Region: Pembina Valley
- Census Division: No. 3

Government
  - Governing Body: Rural Municipality of Thompson Council
  - MP: Branden Leslie
  - MLA: Lauren Stone
- Time zone: UTC−6 (CST)
  - Summer (DST): UTC−5 (CDT)
- Area code: 204
- NTS Map: 062G08
- GNBC Code: GAGJL

Deerwood is a locality in south central Manitoba, Canada. It is located approximately 31 kilometers (19 miles) northwest of Morden, Manitoba in the Rural Municipality of Thompson.

The Post Office was established on 2-21-5W in 1895 and closed in 1968. It was a railway point on the Northern Pacific Railway and was named by a railway official for the number of deer in a heavily wooded area while railway construction was taking place. It was also a School District from 1908 to 1951.

== Climate ==
According to the Köppen Climate Classification system, Deerwood has a humid continental climate, abbreviated "Dfb" on climate maps.
