= List of historic places in Northern Region, Manitoba =

This is a list of historic places in Northern Region, Manitoba, entered on the Canadian Register of Historic Places, whether they are federal, provincial, or municipal.

== List of historic places ==
Name	Address	Coordinates	Government recognition (CRHP №)	Wikidata ID	Image
Depot	York Factory MB	57°02′37″N 92°14′53″W	Federal (2969)		
Air Terminal Building H-7	Churchill Airport; Churchill MB	58°44′14″N 94°03′22″W	Federal (9709)		
Canadian Imperial Bank of Commerce Building	464 Sherritt Avenue; Lynn Lake MB	58°51′05″N 101°02′42″W	Lynn Lake municipality (17142)		Upload Photo
York Factory National Historic Site of Canada	York Factory MB	57°02′42″N 92°14′55″W	Federal (4481)		More images
Via Rail - Canadian National Railway Station	1st Street & Railway Ave. Churchill MB	58°46′08″N 94°10′23″W	Federal (6727, (9525)		
Prince of Wales Fort National Historic Site of Canada	Eskimo Point MB	58°47′36″N 94°12′43″W	Federal (7760)		More images
Sea Horse Gully Remains National Historic Site of Canada	West Peninsula of Churchill River opposite town of Churchill; Churchill MB	58°46′36″N 94°14′43″W	Federal (18791)		Upload Photo
Flin Flon Museum	Flin Flon; MB	54°46′14″N 101°50′24″W	Federal (20246)		Upload Photo
Norway House National Historic Site of Canada	Norway House MB	53°59′19″N 97°49′08″W	Federal (12041)		
Churchill Rocket Research Range National Historic Site of Canada	Churchill MB	58°46′39″N 93°43′07″W	Federal (12776)		
St. Paul's Anglican Church	67 Bernier Street; Churchill MB	58°46′13″N 94°10′13″W	Manitoba (17141)		
Archway Warehouse, Jail and Powder Magazine Remains	Norway House 17; Norway House MB	53°58′54″N 97°50′11″W	Manitoba (15866)		Upload Photo
VIA Rail/Canadian National Railways Station	Railway Avenue; Cranberry Portage MB	54°35′09″N 101°22′56″W	Federal (4548), Cranberry Portage municipality (19930)		
Crane River Reserve Catholic Church Site	Crane River 51; Crane River MB	51°30′53″N 99°15′39″W	Crane River municipality (15147)		Upload Photo
VIA Rail/Canadian National Railways Station	252 Railway Avenue; Gillam MB	56°20′51″N 94°41′59″W	Federal (4548)		Upload Photo
Bank of Commerce Building	162 Fischer Avenue; Kelsey (Carrot Valley) MB	53°49′08″N 101°14′56″W	Kelsey (Carrot Valley) municipality (9313)		Upload Photo
Christ Church	2 Saskatchewan Crescent, The Pas; Kelsey (Carrot Valley) MB	53°49′38″N 101°15′24″W	Kelsey (Carrot Valley) municipality (20245)		Upload Photo
Court House and Community Building	306 Fischer Avenue; Kelsey (Carrot Valley) MB	53°49′08″N 101°14′56″W	Manitoba (9314)		Upload Photo
Charlebois Chapel	108 First Street West; Kelsey (Carrot Valley) MB	53°49′17″N 101°14′46″W	Kelsey (Carrot Valley) municipality (9315)		Upload Photo
Heritage North Museum	162 Princeton Drive; Thompson MB	55°43′58″N 97°51′18″W	Thompson municipality (19368)		Upload Photo
Wanipigow Lake Archaeological Site	Division No. 19 MB	51°04′40″N 95°54′30″W	Manitoba (8980)		Upload Photo

== See also ==
- List of historic places in Manitoba
- List of National Historic Sites of Canada in Manitoba
