= Birks Building =

Coordinates: 49.8939°N 97.1419°W

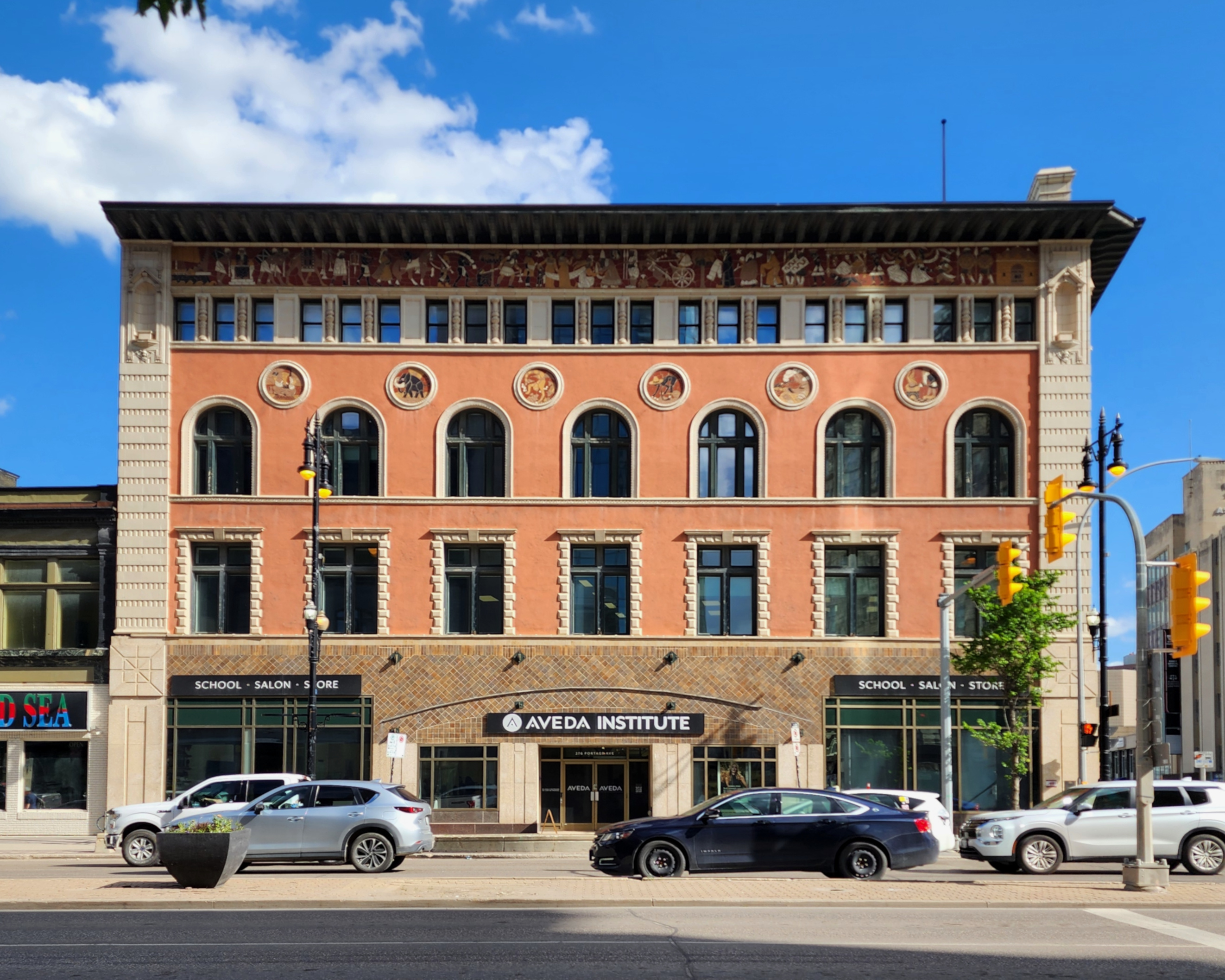
- Birks Building, Portage Ave facade
- Former names: YMCA Building

General information
- Architectural style: Italianate (originally Romanesque)
- Location: 276 Portage Avenue, Winnipeg, MB
- Current tenants: Aveda Institute Winnipeg
- Construction started: January 1, 1901
- Completed: December 31, 1901
- Renovated: 1914
- Cost: $88,500 CAD

Technical details
- Floor count: 4

Design and construction
- Architect: George Browne
- Main contractor: J. A. Garvin and P. Burnett

Renovating team
- Architect: Percy E. Nobbs

Municipally Designated Site
- Designation: Winnipeg Landmark Heritage Structure
- Recognized: 1999-10-26
- CRHP listing: 2004-08-31
- Recognition authority: City of Winnipeg
- ID: 1535

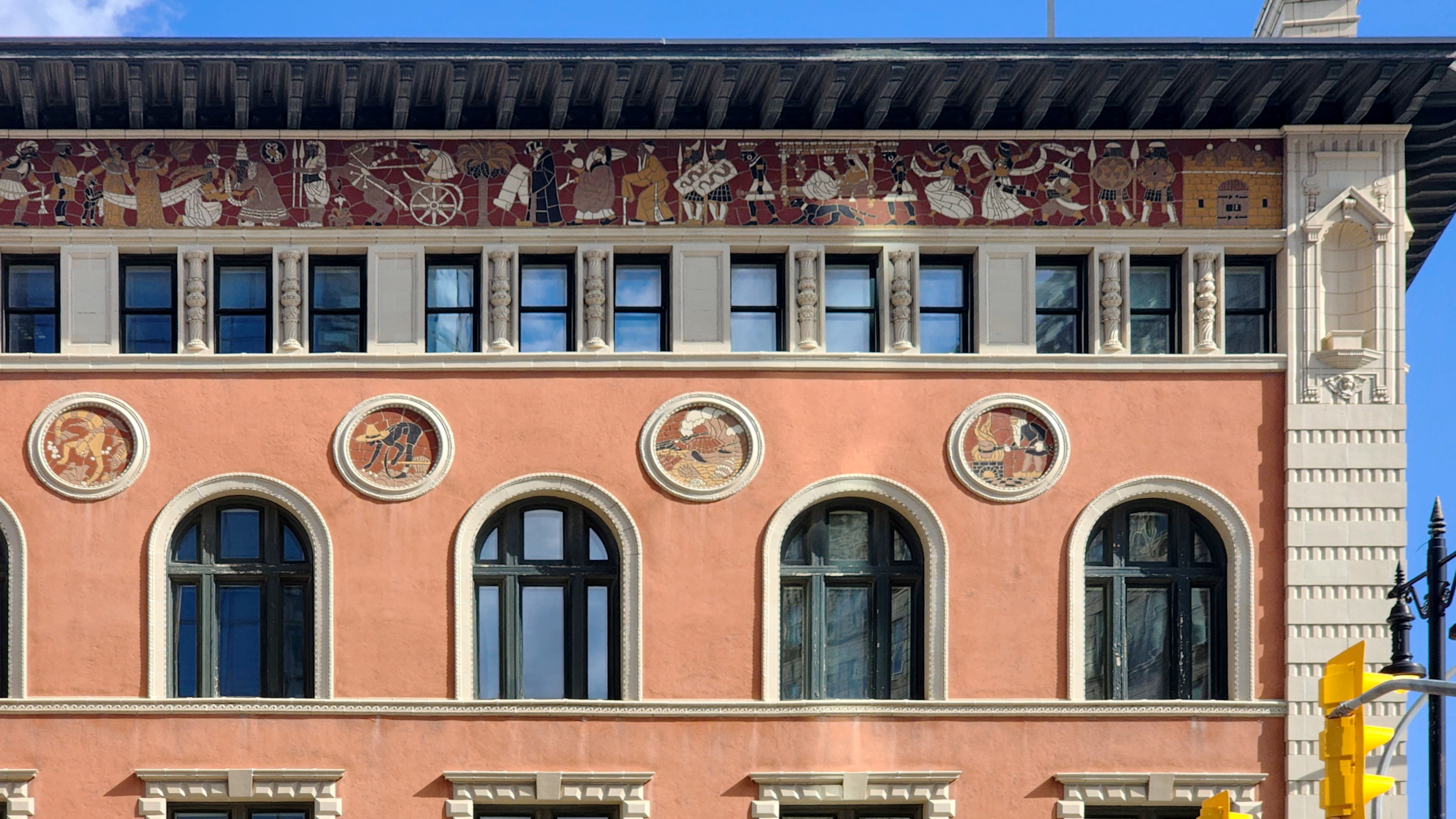
Details of the facade mosaics

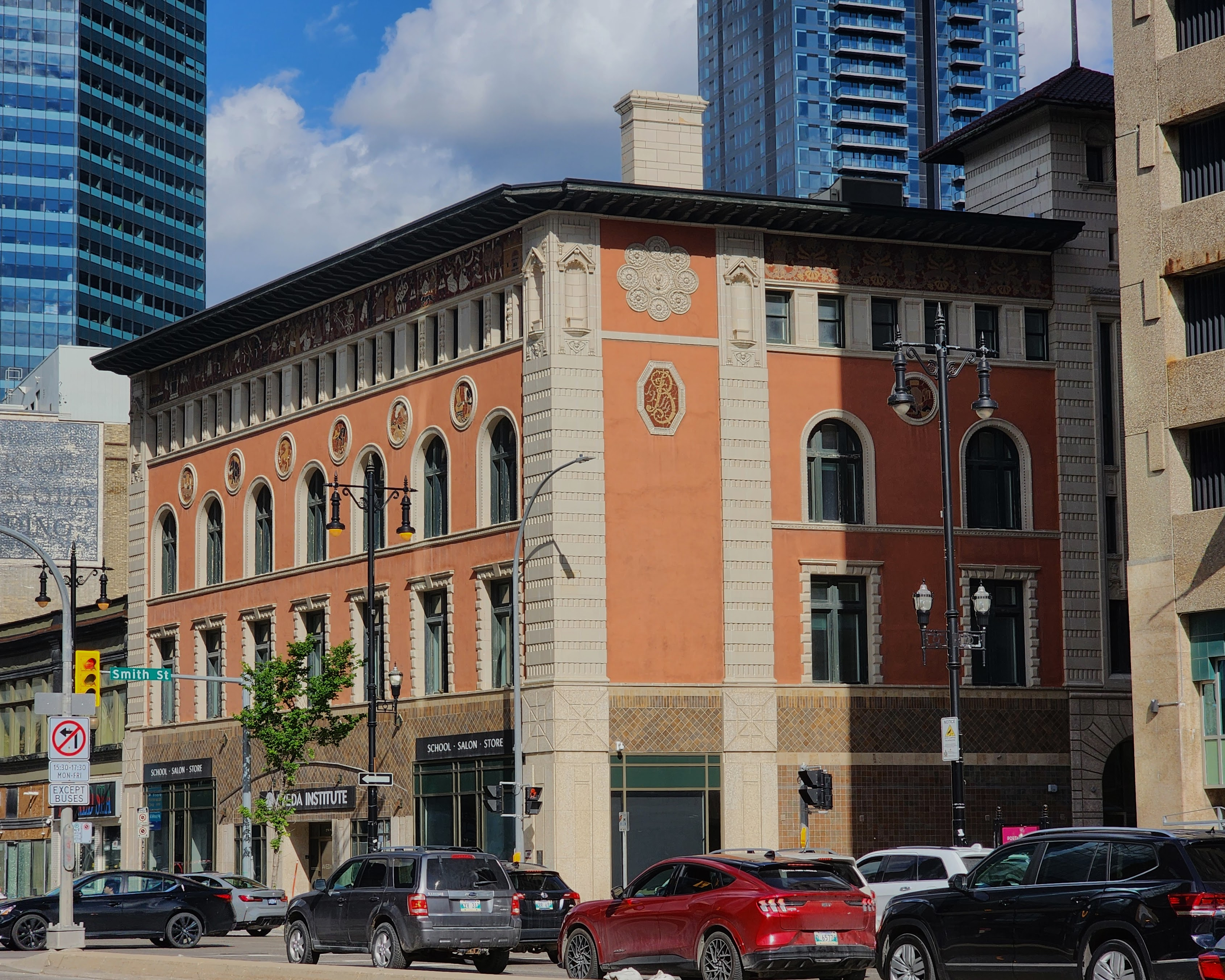
Birks building seen from the side showing the ornate B

The Birks Building (formerly known as the YMCA Building) is a four-storey building located on the corner of Portage Avenue and Smith Street in Winnipeg, Manitoba.

== History ==
Completed in 1901, it was originally built for Winnipeg YMCA. The land had been purchased by YMCA in June 1890. Designed by local architect George Browne, the building cost $88,500 and was officially opened January 18, 1901.

As it was when it was created for YMCA, the building included a rotunda, reading rooms, parlour, a 150-seat lecture hall, 600-seat auditorium, running track, gymnasium, recreation room, boys' quarters, two meeting halls, classrooms, a library, boardroom and furnished bedrooms, showers, lockers and two bowling alleys. The building also featured Winnipeg's first indoor pool. The first floor featured retail space, which was home to a variety of tenants over the years, including Canadian General Electric (1900-1905), Forrester and Hatcher, Pianos (1900-1904), Great West Permanent Loan and Savings (1904-1906), and the New York Hair Store (1905-1910). The entire fourth floor was home to over 20 dormitories, along with a kitchen, sitting rooms and a common bathroom.

=== Birks ===
In September of 1912, Birks, a company that designs, manufactures and retails jewelry, timepieces, silverware and gifts, acquired the building. The building would be the Winnipeg showpiece for Birks for nearly eighty years. The building was significantly reworked in 1912 to accommodate the jewelry store. The rework added distinctive Renaissance Revival palace facades designed by Percy Nobbs, featuring terracotta, granite, bronze and Tyndall stone. Above the third-floor openings are six terracotta medallions depicting the sources of the materials used by jewellers, with a seventh medallion on the north facade. These medallions depict turquoise (representing semi-precious stones), an elephant (representing ivory), a Kimberley Negro searching for diamonds, a man diving for pearls, an oceanic wave delivering the riches of the sea (mother-of-pearl, coral and a tortoise shell), a precious metal-smelting gnome, and a silversmith surrounded by the tools of his trade. Above the medallions is a frieze depicting such characters and places as King Solomon, the Queen of Sheba, gates of Jerusalem, Hiram, king of Tyre, Negroes and an Indian, and the three wise men giving and receiving gifts.

In 1951, $150,000 of alterations were made to the ground-floor show-window area. These alterations included a granite base and Tyndall stone facings surrounding the solid bronze show windows, as well as corner columns and vestibule walls lined with Travertine marble.

Birks continued in this building until the 1987 when it moved to 191 Lombard Avenue, entrance on corner of Main Street, in the historic Union Tower Building. In 1987 the building was listed for sale for $1.2 million.

In 1990 Birks installed temporary gas furnaces on each floor, as the Amy Street Steam Plant had shut down. Birks had been trying to sell the building for three years after having moved to the Portage Place location.

By 1991, the basement, first, second and third floors had all been substantially altered by the Birks Company, leaving only the fourth floor of dormitories unaltered from YMCA's era. That year Henry Birks and Sons requested that the city not list the location as an historic building. The building, which was originally offered for sale in 1987 for $1.2 million, was at that time listed for $500,000 but had not sold.

=== Brian Finnegan ===
The building was purchased in 1992 by Brian Finnegan, the owner-operator of the internet service provider Pangea. He secured Musiplex as the ground-floor tenant. Over the next several years, Finnegan planned and executed improvements to the building including removing the 40-year-old exterior limestone cladding, widening the ground-floor windows, restoring the upper storey exteriors, and installing high-speed data access. Finnegan agreed to allow the city to designate it as a historical building in exchange for heritage tax credits towards future renovations. Finnegan spent nearly $1M restoring the exterior of the building.

The Birks building was formally recognized as a Winnipeg Landmark Heritage Structure on 36 October 1999, and was listed on the Canadian Register of Historic Places on 31 August 2004.

=== Ash Management ===
In 2003, the building was purchased by Ash Management for $850,000, with intention to convert it to offices. The building had been empty since 2001 when music retailer CDplus ceased operations. Ash Management intended to gut the building and install new electrical, mechanical, plumbing, heating and air-conditioning.

By 2006, it was redeveloped into a modern office building, built to the Leadership in Energy and Environmental Design (LEED) Silver standard. The building had been empty since 2001. The renovation included the entire interior, excluding an old terrazzo marble staircase, with an estimated cost of $5 million. The permitted renovation was listed at $3.1 million. Part of the financing of the renovation included a $230,000 building tax credit from the city and $600,000 from a federal program for commercial heritage buildings.

The building reopened in 2007 as the home of the Winnipeg Land Titles Office, Surveys Branch, and the Personal Property Registry.

In 2023, the Aveda Institute Winnipeg moved into the building after a $4 million renovation.

== Thefts ==
On July 23rd 1962, a platinum solitaire diamond ring valued at $17,500 retail or $12,603 wholesale was stolen from the Henry Birks and Sons store at this location. The ring was returned to police on the 26th. It had been handed to the Chief Constable, who refused to release further details of the transaction. Kenneth Leonard Wallden was charged with the theft. Wallden was sentenced to one year in jail for the crime.

On June 8 1969, $350,000 worth of jewels and valuables were stolen from the Birks and Sons store, one of the biggest jewel heists in western Canada at the time. Three Minneapolis men were charged with breaking and entering. Charges against the three were stayed due to insufficient evidence, while no jewels had been found.

In January of 1972, just over $1000 worth of watches and assorted jewelry were stolen after a plate glass window was smashed at the Birks location. A further smash and grab of watches occurred in August that same year, for which Elwood William Baron was arrested and sentenced to 18 months in jail. The stolen watches were valued at $124. A November 1973 smash and grab of watches resulted in a loss of $400 worth of merchandise.

== Design features ==
The building retains many distinctive visual elements, including:

- overhanging decorative cornice
- various window shapes, including rectangular on the main floor, arched on the second floor and small rectangular shapes in the attic storey
- all windows outlined with distinct surround treatments
- decorative elements including quoins, niches, and an attic-level frieze
- terracotta colour for the stucco areas contrasting with the cream-coloured terracotta tiles
- north and west facades feature medallions depicting sources of materials used by jewellers
- Birks company logo in terracotta and tile on the west facade and painted wall signage on the east
