= Miami Railway Station =

Railway station in Manitoba, Canada

Coordinates: 49°22′11.50″N 98°14′38.09″W

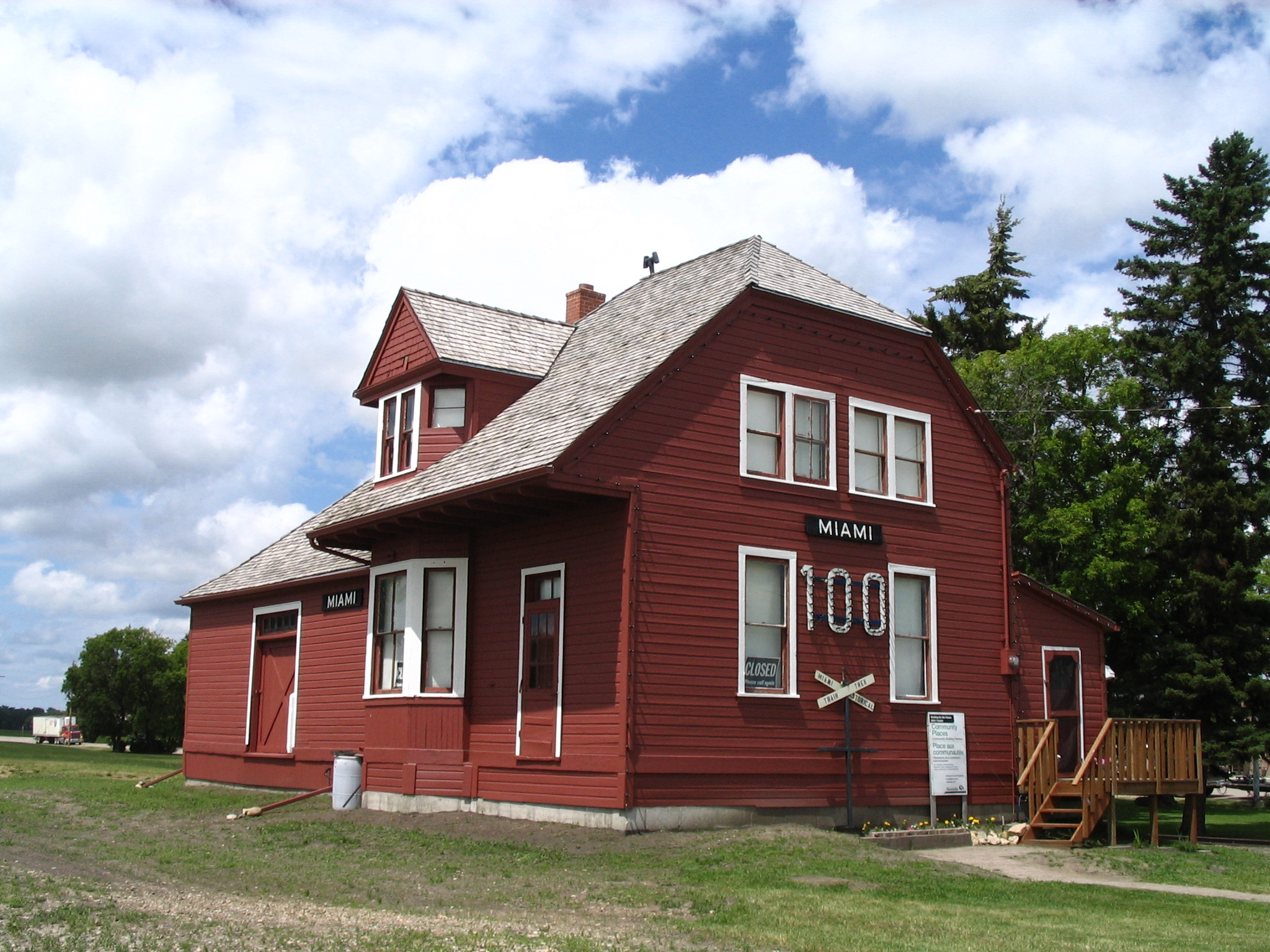
- Interactive map of the Miami Railway Station area
- Former names: Miami Northern Pacific and Manitoba Railway Station; Canadian Northern Railway Station; Canadian National Railway Station; Miami Railway Station Museum Association

General information
- Location: Miami, Manitoba, Canada
- Completed: 1889

Technical details
- Floor count: 2

Website
- www.miamirailwaystationmuseum.com

National Historic Site of Canada
- Official name: Miami Railway Station (Canadian Northern) National Historic Site of Canada
- Designated: 15 June 1976

The Miami Railway Station is a former railway station in Miami, Manitoba, Canada, built by the Northern Pacific and Manitoba Railway Company in 1889. Designated as a National Historic Site of Canada in 1976, it is now a railway museum that operates during the summer. The museum is at the southern end of the village near the intersection of Highway 23 and Letain Street.

== Background ==
From 1879 to 1882 the provincial government of John Norquay in the 4th Manitoba Legislature was making greater demands for provincial rights from the Government of Canada. This strategy yielded an expansion of the province's borders in 1881 and increased subsidies from the federal government, but the province also ceded rights it had previously claimed. It also accepted the federal government's control over chartering railways in the province instituted as a federal disallowance, in which the Canadian Pacific Railway (CPR) operated as a monopoly. In 1885, facing an economic crisis, the provincial government was offered an increased subsidy of $330,000 annually, but had to accept a "finality clause" representing a "final settlement of all outstanding issues" between the provincial and federal governments; it would prevent the province from seeking control over its natural resources or asking for boundary extensions, and it could not charter railways running to the United States.

In 1887, Norquay was driven from office by a fabricated scandal, and Thomas Greenway assumed the premiership. He appointed Joseph Martin as the province's Attorney-General and Commissioner of Railways. Greenway engaged in separate discussions with executives from CPR, the Manitoba Central Railway, and the US-based Northern Pacific Railway (NPR), hoping to expand railway service in the province and reduce freight costs. He and Martin negotiated a deal between the province and Northern Pacific Railway in mid 1888 that would result in NPR building the Red River Valley Railway connecting Winnipeg to its US network, and two branch lines, one from Winnipeg to Portage la Prairie, the other from Morris to Brandon. (Note: The branch line from Morris to Brandon would pass through Miami.)

Unbeknownst to them, the NPR wanted control of the Red River Valley Railway as a lever to threaten the CPR, which had made incursions into NPR's territory in Puget Sound in northwestern United States. In 1889, the two railways agreed to equalize their rates in Manitoba and Puget Sound. The Manitoba Free Press was critical of the deal between the province and NPR, and after the newspaper was sold to CPR in September 1888 it started printing allegations that Greenway and Martin had each received a $50,000 bribe from NPR.

The Miami Northern Pacific and Manitoba Railway Station was built in 1889. Ten years later it was acquired by William Mackenzie and Donald Mann as they undertook creation of a transcontinental railway that would become the Canadian Northern Railway.

== Description ==
The building's construction suggests "efficiency and economy", a wood-frame structure built in 1889 with a high-hipped gable roof from which protrudes a dormer used as an observation bay. The sides are "abruptly truncated", with one end connected to a hip roofed freight shed built in 1913 by Canadian Northern Railway, which succeeded Northern Pacific Railway.

The interior consists of a waiting room, and station agent's office with a station master's desk. The upper floor was used as a residence by the station master.

== National Historic Site ==
The station continued to operate until the 1970s, at which time it was part of the Canadian National Railway (CNR). In 1976, Miami Railway Station was designated a National Historic Site of Canada. In 1999, CNR sold the branch line between Morris and Elgin passing through Miami to the Tulare Valley Railroad, which removed the track for salvage in 2007.

The station's windows, some of which had deteriorated or become damaged, were repaired with Parks Canada contributing matching funding to the project. In 2008, a new foundation was rebuilt, and in 2015 the roof was repaired.

It is the only surviving station built by the Northern Pacific and Manitoba Railway in this style. On 23 April 2008, the station was designated as a Manitoba Municipal Heritage Site. The community often uses the station in advertising, which is one of its "most visible features". It is now one of two museums in the village, the other being the Miami Museum, and it drew about 1,000 visitors in 2015, mostly from regional events. The theme of the museum is to depict the role of a stationmaster at the turn of the 20th century.

With funding from the federal government's summer jobs program and from the Rural Municipality of Thompson, the museum hired a student who made archival records of each item at the museum using cataloguing software from the Canadian Fossil Discovery Centre.
