= Ukrainian Cultural and Educational Centre =

- Осередoк Украïнськoï Культури й Освiти
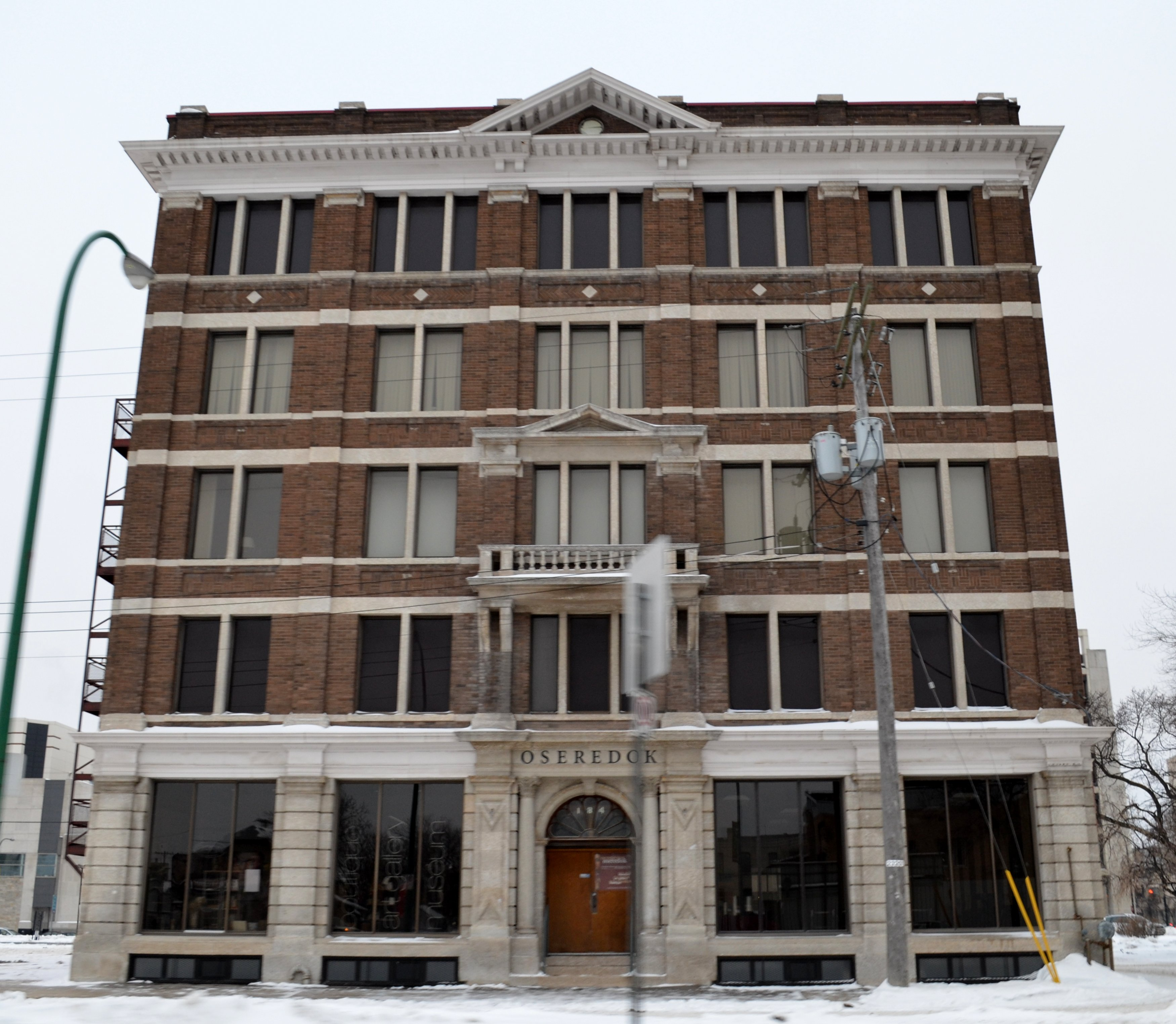
- Established: 1944
- Location: 184 Alexander Ave. E, Winnipeg, MB R3B 0L6
- Coordinates: 49.9012°N 97.1359°W
- Type: museum, gallery and library
- Collection size: 40,000
- Founder: Ukrainian National Federation of Canada
- Executive director: Glen Knapp
- President: Luba Demko
- Website: oseredok.ca

Municipally Designated Site
- Designation: Winnipeg Landmark Heritage Structure
- Recognized: April 21, 1980
- CRHP listing: November 16, 2007
- Recognition authority: City of Winnipeg
- ID: 8226

The Ukrainian Cultural and Educational Centre (Ukrainian: Осередoк Украïнськoï Культури й Освiти, Oseredok Ukrains’koi Kul’tury i Osvity)—also known as Oseredok (Ukrainian for 'centre')—is a museum, gallery, and library in Winnipeg, Manitoba, celebrating the Ukrainian Canadian community. It is the largest Ukrainian cultural institution of its kind in Canada.

Founded in 1944 by the Ukrainian National Federation of Canada, the museum collects and preserves materials and artifacts including documents, ancient maps, rare books, film, photographs, items of folk art, pioneers' tools, musical instruments, and regional folk costumes. The gallery exhibits work of Canadian and international Ukrainian artists.

The library holds over 40,000 books and periodicals in Ukrainian and English including collections of children's books, folklore, music, humanities and sciences, a rare book collection and reference materials.

The museum is affiliated with the CMA, CHIN, and Virtual Museum of Canada.

Hours of operation: Monday – Saturday (10 AM – 4 PM)

The centre held an online art auction of works donated by artists and city collectors that ran until 9 p.m. on May 4. Proceeds would go to the Canada-Ukraine Fund, as well as Oseredok’s initiatives to assist Ukrainian refugees arriving in Manitoba.
