= Rosebank, Manitoba =

Rosebank
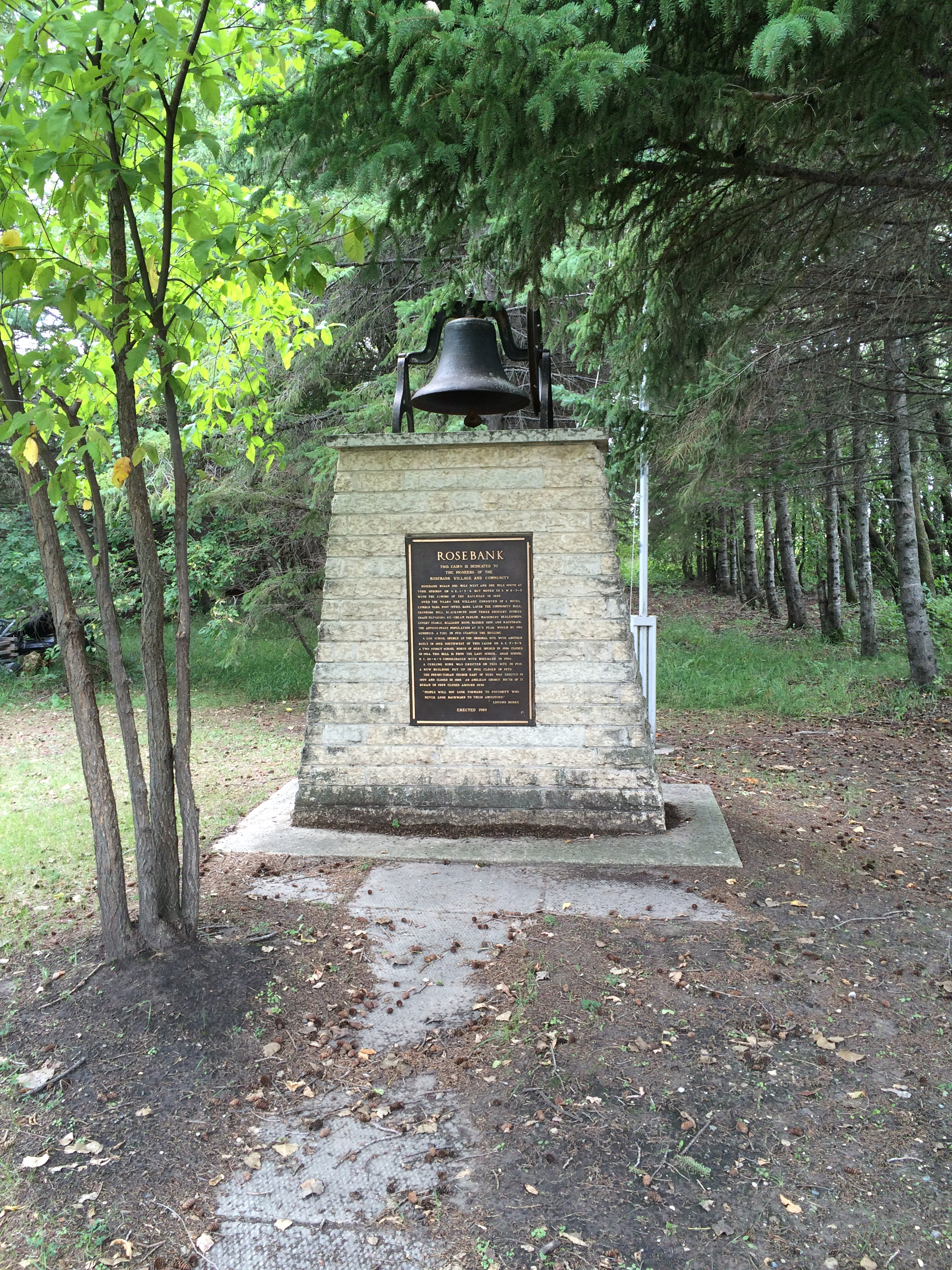
- Cairn Dedicated to the Pioneers of the Rosebank Community

- Location of Rosebank in Manitoba
- Coordinates: 49°22′14″N 98°6′48″W
- Country: Canada
- Province: Manitoba
- Region: Pembina Valley
- Census Division: No. 3

Government
  - Governing Body: Rural Municipality of Thompson Council
  - MP: Branden Leslie
  - MLA: Lauren Stone
- Time zone: UTC−6 (CST)
  - Summer (DST): UTC−5 (CDT)
- Area code: 204
- NTS Map: 062G08
- GNBC Code: GAXMB

Rosebank is an unincorporated community in south central Manitoba, Canada. It is located approximately 20 kilometers (12 miles) north of Morden, Manitoba in the Rural Municipality of Thompson.
