= List of National Historic Sites of Canada in Manitoba =

This is a list of National Historic Sites in Manitoba (French: Lieux historiques nationaux du Manitoba). There are 58 National Historic Sites designated in the province, eight of which are administered by Parks Canada. This list uses names designated by the national Historic Sites and Monuments Board, which may differ from other names for these sites.

Numerous National Historic Events also occurred across Manitoba, and are identified at places associated with them using the same style of federal plaques that marks National Historic Sites. Several National Historic Persons are commemorated throughout the province in the same way. The markers do not indicate which designation—a Site, Event, or Person—a subject has been given.

== National Historic Sites ==
Legend
administered by Parks Canada

Site	Date(s)	Designated	Location	Description	Image
Battle of Seven Oaks	1816 (battle)	1920	Winnipeg; 49°55′55″N 97°7′16″W	The site of a violent conflict between a group of Métis led by Cuthbert Grant and a party of Red River settlers led by Governor Robert Semple	Monument to the Battle of Seven Oaks
BCATP Hangar No. 1	1941 (completed)	2001	Brandon; 49°54′16″N 99°56′39″W	A well-preserved example of a British Commonwealth Air Training Plan hangar from the Second World War, still in its original location	Fairchild PT-26B Cornell (C-GATP / FV725) in flying condition at the BCATP Hangar No. 1
Brockinton	800 AD (c.)	1973	Melita; 49°8′51″N 101°1′47″W	An archaeological site with evidence of three distinct cultures: a bison kill and butchering pound circa 800 AD, a Duck Bay culture occupation about 1100–1350, and the first excavated evidence in Canada of the Williams culture from about 1600	Brockington Interpretive Sign
Brookside Cemetery	1878	2023	Winnipeg; 49.9205°N 97.2224°W	Largest and one of the oldest cemeteries in the West, noted for its picturesque design and Field of Honour	
Camp Hughes	1909 (established)	2011	North Cypress; 49°53′1.47″N 99°33′4.82″W	More than 38,000 Canadians trained at this camp during the First World War, many of whom fought at the Battle of Vimy Ridge in April 1917	Soldiers at Camp Hughes in 1914
Canadian Pacific Railway Station (Winnipeg)	1906 (completed)	1982	Winnipeg; 49°54′17″N 97°7′54″W	A four-storey former railway station; its landmark Beaux-Arts design and elaborate Tyndall stone detailing reflect the early 20th century growth and importance of both the Canadian Pacific Railway and Winnipeg as Western Canada's transportation hub	Canadian Pacific Railway Station (Winnipeg) circa 1920
Churchill Rocket Research Range	1956 (established)	1988	Churchill; 58°44′3″N 93°49′13″W	A former facility for the launching, tracking and retrieval of rockets; long Canada's foremost upper atmosphere research centre	
Confederation Building	1912 (completed)	1976	Winnipeg; 49°53′55″N 97°8′19″W	A 10-storey office building; a good example of an early Sullivan-inspired skyscraper; also part of the Early Skyscrapers in Winnipeg NHSC	Confederation Building
Dalnavert	1895 (completed)	1990	Winnipeg; 49°53′9″N 97°8′31″W	A red-brick house with a large wooden verandah, originally built for Hugh John Macdonald; a good example of the Queen Anne Revival style in Canada	Dalnavert in winter
Dominion Exhibition Display Building II	1913 (completed)	1999	Brandon; 49°49′53″N 99°57′27″W	A wooden exhibition building; the only known surviving building constructed for the Dominion Exhibition held annually from 1879 to 1913	
Early Skyscrapers in Winnipeg	1912-18 (period of construction)	1981	Winnipeg; 49°53′49″N 97°8′18″W	A group of three tall commercial buildings (Union Trust Tower, the Confederation Building, and the Bank of Hamilton building) within the Exchange District. Reflective of the Chicago School, the group typifies Winnipeg's early skyscrapers, which marked the beginning of the city's modern urban core.	Banks row in Winnipeg, including the Union Trust and Bank of Hamilton buildings
Exchange District	1880 (established)	1996	Winnipeg; 49°53′56.18″N 97°8′25.32″W	A dense, turn-of-the-century warehousing and business centre, comprising about 150 buildings; contains a number of architecturally significant buildings illustrating Winnipeg's key role as a gateway to Western Canada between 1880 and 1913	Electric Railway Chambers in Winnipeg's Exchange District
First Homestead in Western Canada	1872 (completed)	1945	Portage la Prairie; 50°3′45″N 98°17′8″W	The site of the first homestead in Western Canada, established under the federal government's new survey system	
Former Portage la Prairie Indian Residential School	1915	September 1, 2020	Long Plain First Nation; 49.962318°N 98.323009°W	A rare surviving example of a residential school, where the federal government and certain churches and religious organizations worked together to assimilate Indigenous children as part of a broad set of efforts to destroy Indigenous cultures and identities and suppress Indigenous histories.	
Former Union Bank Building / Annex	1904 (completed)	1996	Winnipeg; 49°53′56″N 97°8′22″W	A 10-storey tower with a single-storey annex; the first skyscraper in Western Canada, representative of the key role played by finance in the expansion of the west	Union Bank building and annex
Fort Dauphin	1741 (established)	1943	Winnipegosis; 51°39′18″N 99°55′19″W	The site of a fort built by Pierre Gaultier de La Vérendrye in the fall of 1741 at the request of the Cree and Assiniboine peoples	
Fort Dufferin	1872 (established)	1937	Emerson; 49°1′50″N 97°12′7″W	Buildings used as the main camp for the North American Boundary Commission in 1872, and then used by the North-West Mounted Police in preparing for the "March West" in 1875; representative of Canada's assertion of sovereignty over Manitoba and the North-West Territories in the 1870s	Fort Dufferin
Fort Garry Hotel	1913 (completed)	1981	Winnipeg; 49°53′16″N 97°8′12″W	One of a series of Château-style hotels built by Canadian railway companies in the early 20th century to encourage tourists to travel the country's transcontinental routes	Exterior view of the Fort Garry Hotel
Fort La Reine	1738 (established)	1925	Portage la Prairie; 49°57′4″N 98°19′38″W	The former site of a French fort on the north bank of the Assiniboine River; used as a base for further exploration of the Canadian Prairies, it was the most important of the posts established by Pierre Gaultier de La Vérendrye	
Forts Rouge, Garry, and Gibraltar	1738 (Rouge established) 1807 (Gibraltar est.) 1821 (Garry est.)	1924	Winnipeg; 49°53′16.49″N 97°8′7.21″W; 49°53′57.6″N 97°7′32.58″W	The sites of three fur trade forts once located near the forks of the Red and Assiniboine rivers (the north gate of Fort Garry II is the only surviving above-ground remains); representative of the three phases of the fur trade	The gate as Fort Garry
Grey Nuns' Convent	1851 (completed)	1958	Winnipeg; 49°53′16″N 97°7′23″W	A convent built for the Grey Nuns and the first mission house of its kind in Western Canada; an outstanding example of Red River frame construction, and the oldest convent in use on the Canadian Prairies at the time of its designation	Interior of the Grey Nuns' Convent
Holy Trinity Anglican Church	1884 (completed)	1990	Winnipeg; 49°53′33″N 97°8′32″W	A noted example of Victorian High Gothic architecture in Canada; a landmark church in central Winnipeg which has witnessed the evolution of the area from open prairie to commercial core.	Holy Trinity Anglican Church in 1889
Inglis Grain Elevators	1922 to 1941 (period of construction)	1995	Shellmouth-Boulton; 50°56′38″N 101°14′57″W	A row of five wooden elevators lined up parallel to the railway tracks; rare surviving prairie icons from the "golden age of grain"	The Inglis Grain Elevators as seen from the railway tracks
Linear Mounds	900 AD (c.)	1973	Melita; 49°6′57″N 101°1′4″W	A site containing some of the best-preserved tumuli belonging to the Devil's Lake-Sourisford Burial Complex	
Lower Fort Garry	1830 (established)	1950	Selkirk; 50°6′44″N 96°55′55″W	A Hudson's Bay Company fort comprising a number of restored and reconstructed buildings within and outside its stone walls; a major supply centre for the fur trade in Western Canada and the location of the signing of Treaty 1	A stone building at Lower Fort Garry
Maison Gabrielle-Roy	1905 (completed)	2008	Winnipeg; 49°53′24.68″N 97°6′39.73″W	The 2 1/2-storey wood-frame house where Gabrielle Roy was born and lived for almost 30 years; the house inspired Roy's writing and she described and idealized it in several of her works	
Manitoba Theatre Centre	1970 (completed)	2009	Winnipeg; 49°53′55″N 97°8′12″W	An excellent example of small-scale Brutalist architecture in Canada and an exceptional theatre design; associated with the Manitoba Theatre Centre group, noted as a model regional theatre by the Canada Council for the Arts	Exterior of Manitoba Theatre Centre
Metropolitan Theatre	1919 (completed)	1991	Winnipeg; 49°53′35″N 97°8′34″W	A movie palace designed by C. Howard Crane; representative of the cultural impact of movie theatres in the 1920, and of the battle between the Allen and Famous Players chains for film-distribution supremacy in Canada	Sketch of the Allen Theatre, later named the "Met", in 1919
Miami Railway Station (Canadian Northern)	1905 (completed)	1976	Miami; 49°22′11″N 98°14′38″W	A wooden railway station located in a rural community; a rare surviving example of a Canadian Northern Railway station	Exterior of the Miami Railway Station
Miss Davis' School Residence / Twin Oaks	1866 (c.) (completed)	1962	St. Andrews; 50°3′22″N 96°59′17″W	A two-storey limestone structure on one of the original river lots, built to house a school to educate the daughters of settlers and Hudson's Bay Company officials: a noted example of mid 19th-century Red River architecture	Exterior of Miss Davis' School Residence
Neepawa Court House / Beautiful Plains County Court Building	1884 (completed)	1981	Neepawa; 50°13′44″N 99°27′54″W	A two-storey buff brick building, the construction of which in the late-19th century secured Neepawa's place as the most prominent town in the district; representative of civic buildings of the period that were built to serve a number of public uses, in this case being the county and municipal offices, a courthouse, police station and theatre	Exterior of the Neepawa Court House
Neubergthal Street Village	1876 (established)	1989	Rhineland; 49°4′28″N 97°28′57″W	A living illustration of a Mennonite village on the Canadian Prairies, with the community's communal and self-sufficient values reflected in its development and architectural forms	Neubergthal, MB
Norway House	1825 (established)	1932	Norway House; 53°59′23″N 97°49′2″W	The remnants of a former Hudson's Bay Company fort near the banks of the Nelson River; the company's principal inland depot for the fur trade and the site where Treaty 5 was signed in 1875	Norway House 1878
Pantages Playhouse Theatre	1914 (completed)	1985	Winnipeg; 49°53′56″N 97°8′16″W	A former vaudeville theatre; one of the finest theatres built in Canada in this period for live theatrical performances	
Portage la Prairie Public Building	1898 (completed)	1983	Portage la Prairie; 49°58′21″N 98°17′11″W	Constructed as the town's post office, customs house and inland revenue office, now the city hall; representative of small urban post offices by Thomas Fuller	
Prince of Wales Fort (Fort Churchill)	1731 (established)	1920	Churchill; 58°47′49.86″N 94°12′47.57″W	A fur-trade fortress built by the Hudson's Bay Company on the tundra; illustrative of the rivalry between the British and French for control of Hudson Bay	Aerial view of Prince of Wales Fort
Ralph Connor House	1914 (completed)	2009	Winnipeg; 49°52′38.43″N 97°9′33.32″W	A brick and stone house built for the Reverend Charles Gordon, who in this residence wrote best-selling Christian adventure novels under the pen name of Ralph Connor	Ralph Connor House surrounded by trees
Red River Floodway	1968 (completed)	2000	Winnipeg; 50°5′24″N 96°56′3″W	Winnipeg is located on a floodplain at the confluence of the Red and Assiniboine Rivers, and the floodway diverts excess waters harmlessly around the city; an outstanding engineering achievement both in terms of function and impact	Aerial view of the Red River Floodway
Riding Mountain Park East Gate Registration Complex	1936 (completed)	1992	Riding Mountain National Park; 50°40′58″N 99°33′20″W	Three log buildings (the Whirlpool Warden's Residence, the East Gate Entrance Building, and the Gatekeeper's Cottage) at the eastern entrance to the park; a nationally significant example of 1930s rustic design in Canada's National Parks	The east gate at Riding Mountain National Park
Riel House	1881 (completed)	1976	Winnipeg; 49°49′9″N 97°8′10″W	A squared log house set on the east side of the Red River, where Louis Riel was laid in state after his execution in 1885; representative of Métis river lots, a form of prairie settlement	Riel House exterior
Roslyn Court Apartments	1909 (completed)	1991	Winnipeg; 49°52′50″N 97°8′49″W	A five-storey red brick apartment building; a noted example of the Queen Anne Revival style and turn-of-the-century apartment design	Front facade of the Roslyn Court Apartments
Sea Horse Gully Remains		1969	Churchill; 58°45′58″N 94°15′46″W	Large Dorset and pre-Dorset site and one of the largest number of artifacts; variety of large tools are virtually unique apart from one other site southeast of Churchill	
Souris-Assiniboine Posts	1793 (establishment)	1927	Wawanesa; 49°35′58″N 99°41′2″W	A major supply centre for the fur trade located at the confluence of the Souris and Assiniboine Rivers, where the Hudson's Bay, North West, and XY companies built at least seven forts between 1793 and 1824	
St. Andrew's Anglican Church	1849 (completed)	1970	St. Andrews; 50°4′0″N 96°58′35″W	The oldest surviving stone church in Western Canada which once served as a centre of Anglican missionary activity in Rupert's Land; the earliest example of Gothic Revival architecture in the West	Exterior of St. Andrew's Church
St. Andrew's Rectory	1854 (originally completed)	1962	St. Andrews; 50°3′59″N 96°58′39″W	A two-storey, stone house, first built as a residence for the Anglican parish priest; illustrative of Hudson's Bay Company architecture, which adapted building techniques from Scotland to the Canadian frontier	St Andrew's Rectory from a distance
St. Andrews Caméré Curtain Bridge Dam	1910 (completed)	1990	Lockport; 50°5′4″N 96°56′23″W	A 270-metre-long (890 ft) bridge-dam spanning the Red River; largest movable dam of its type ever constructed, and possibly the only surviving dam of its type in the world	St. Andrews Caméré Curtain Bridge Dam and the Red River
St. Boniface City Hall	1905 (completed)	1984	Winnipeg; 49°53′34″N 97°7′14″W	Built during a period of rapid growth in St. Boniface, it is an outstanding example of a town hall in Western Canada; its large size and formal Classical Revival style was thought to convey the dominance, stability and optimism as a visual symbol of the small city	Exterior of St. Boniface City Hall
St. Boniface Hospital Nurses' Residence	1928 (completed)	1997	Winnipeg; 49°53′3″N 97°7′27″W	A five-storey brick building originally built as a nursing school and residence; constructed in a period of growing recognition of nursing as a profession and it continues to commemorate the contribution of nurses to medicine and the role of women as health care professionals	
St. Michael's Ukrainian Greek Orthodox Church	1899 (completed)	1987	Stuartburn; 49°4′18″N 96°44′26″W	A Byzantine-style wooden church built by the first group of immigrants to Canada from Bukovina, making it the first permanent Ukrainian Orthodox church erected in Canada; representative of early Ukrainian ecclesiastical architecture in Canada, and commemorative of the cultural heritage and skilled craftsmanship the first Ukrainians brought to their new country	St. Michael's Ukrainian Greek Orthodox Church
The Forks	4000 BC (c.)	1974	Winnipeg; 49°53′12″N 97°7′42″W	A recreational and commercial gathering place at a river junction that historically has served as an important transportation point; a cultural landscape that bears witness to 6,000 years of human activity, including being used as a meeting place, fishing camp, trading place and settlement	The Forks Market tower
Ukrainian Catholic Church of the Immaculate Conception	1938 (completed)	1996	Springfield; 50°0′14″N 96°46′22″W	A Kievan-style Ukrainian church whose domes present a distinctive silhouette on the surrounding flat prairie; one of the most ambitious and accomplished of the "Prairie Cathedrals" designed by the Reverend Philip Ruh	Ukrainian Catholic Church of the Immaculate Conception
Ukrainian Catholic Church of the Resurrection	1939 (completed)	1997	Dauphin; 51°8′30″N 100°3′41″W	A large multi-domed concrete church built by the Dauphin Block Ukrainians, planned by Philip Ruh and decorated by Theodore Baran, all based on models in Kiev and Byzantine-style iconography; a memorable expression of the pride and cultural values of the Ukrainian Canadians and a lasting and sophisticated symbol of their roots	Ukrainian Catholic Church of the Resurrection in Dauphin
Ukrainian Labour Temple	1919 (completed)	2009	Winnipeg; 49°55′4.06″N 97°8′54.85″W	A centre of Ukrainian Canadian culture until the late 1960s, and a base for educational, charitable and other immigrant services; an important gathering place in 1919 for Ukrainian strikers during the Winnipeg General Strike	Ukrainian Labour Temple at Pritchard Avenue
Union Station / Winnipeg Railway Station (Canadian National)	1911 (completed)	1976	Winnipeg; 49°53′20″N 97°8′3″W	A Beaux-Arts railway terminal; one of Western Canada's largest railway stations, the construction of which symbolized the confidence of the railway companies and the government in the growth of the West	Front facade of the Union Station / Winnipeg Railway Station (Canadian National)
Walker Theatre	1907 (completed)	1991	Winnipeg; 49°53′45″N 97°8′37″W	A noted example of a surviving early legitimate theatre in Canada, unique in the country due to the Chicago influences in its design; associated with political rallies in its early years, particularly related to the labour and women's suffrage movements	Front facade of the former Walker Theatre, now the Burton Cummings Theatre
Wasyl Negrych Pioneer Homestead	1897 (established)	1997	Gilbert Plains; 51°18′26″N 100°27′2″W	Ten log buildings with associated fields and orchards that collectively represent one of the earliest and best preserved examples of a Ukrainian farm in Canada	
Winnipeg Law Courts	1916 (completed)	1981	Winnipeg; 49°53′12″N 97°8′48″W	A three-storey, Beaux-Arts court house of sculpted grey limestone, located directly across from the Manitoba Legislative Building; its siting and classically inspired design symbolize the importance of Manitoba's court system	The Winnipeg Law Courts in winter
York Factory	1684 (established)	1936	York Factory; 57°0′10″N 92°18′17″W	A 17th-century fur trade post, first established by the French and later rebuilt by the Hudson's Bay Company, located near the mouth of the Hayes River; the principal base for expansion of the fur trade into the interior of Western Canada	Aerial view of York Factory in 1925

== See also ==
- History of Manitoba
- List of historic places in Manitoba
