= Rural Municipality of North Norfolk =

Rural municipality in Manitoba, Canada

Coordinates: 49°55′51″N 98°50′08″W

The Rural Municipality of North Norfolk is a former rural municipality (RM) in the Canadian province of Manitoba. It was originally incorporated as a rural municipality on January 1, 1882. It ceased on January 1, 2015 as a result of its provincially mandated amalgamation with the Town of MacGregor to form the Municipality of North Norfolk.
