= Confederation Building (Winnipeg) =

Coordinates: 49.8985°N 97.1388°W

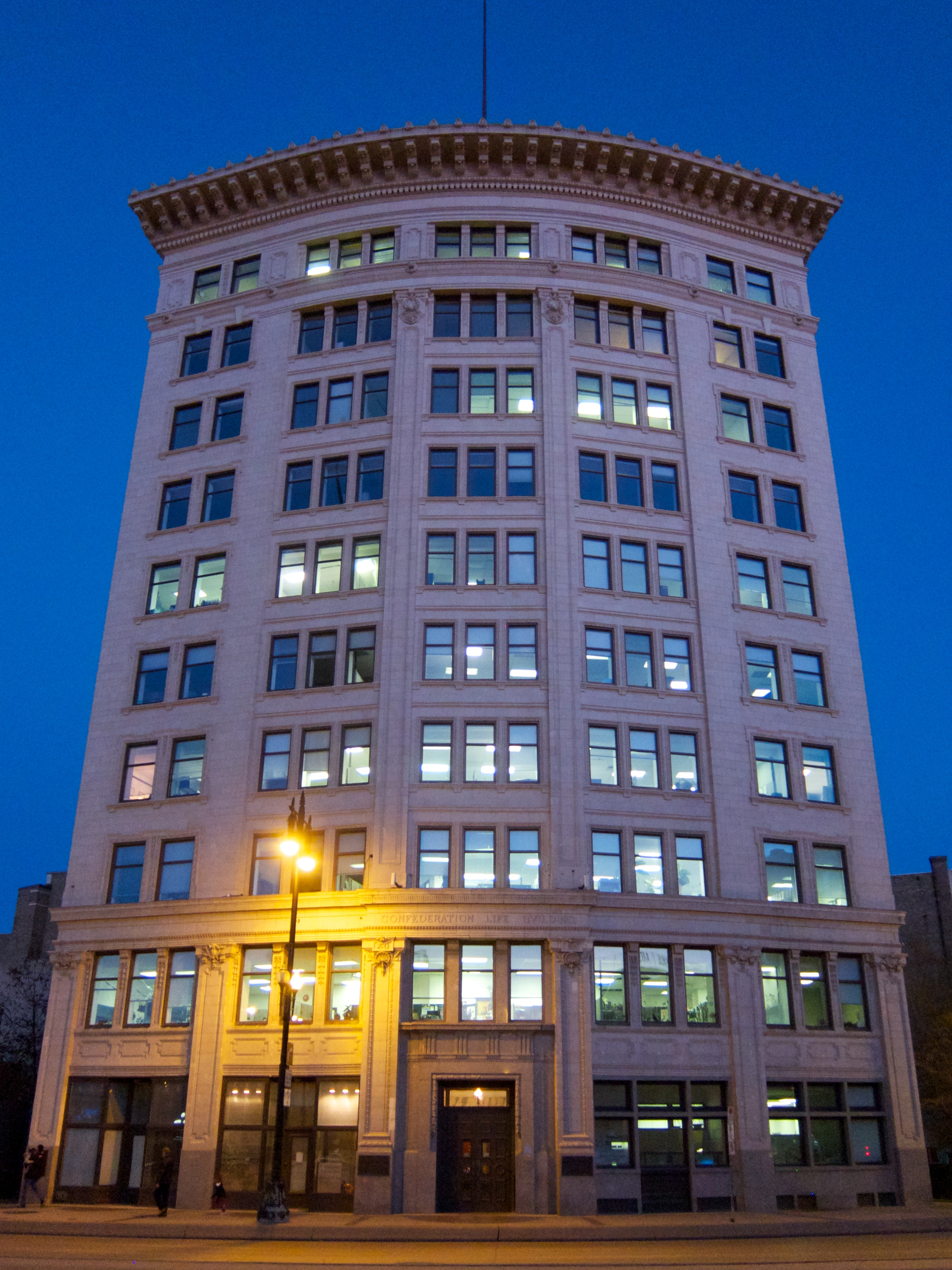

General information
- Architectural style: Chicago school (Louis Sullivan)
- Location: 457 Main St, Winnipeg, Manitoba
- Completed: 1912-1913
- Renovated: 2018
- Cost: $400,000 CAD

Height
- Height: 41 m (135 ft)

Technical details
- Material: terra-cotta
- Floor count: 10

Design and construction
- Architect: J. Wilson Grayf
- Main contractor: Carter-Halls-Aldinger Company

National Historic Site of Canada
- Official name: Confederation Building National Historic Site of Canada
- Designated: November 6, 1976
- Reference no.: 138

The Confederation Building is a 10-storey office building along the Exchange District of Winnipeg, Manitoba, built by architect J. Wilson Gray. Built in 1913, the building was originally owned and occupied by the Confederation Life Association.

It stands 41 m (135 ft) tall and was designated a National Historic Site of Canada in 1976 for its Chicago school-influenced architecture.

The plaque on the front of the building reads:

The Confederation Building

This ten storey steel-framed office block is representative of early high-rise building construction technology in Winnipeg. Designed in the Chicago style of architecture by J. Wilson Gray of Toronto, it was erected in 1912 by the Carter-Halls-Aldinger Company of Winnipeg at a cost of $400,000.… Its style, use, and placement within Winnipeg's commercial core make it an enduring symbol of the city's great economic and spatial growth in the early twentieth century

- Historic Sites and Monuments Board of Canada
