= Stuartburn, Manitoba =

Coordinates: 49°08′01″N 96°45′47″W

Stuartburn is a small, primarily Ukrainian community in southeastern Manitoba, Canada and situated in the Rural Municipality of Stuartburn. Stuartburn is considered to be the first Ukrainian community in western Canada.

The town is located 11 kilometers (6.8 mi) west of Vita on Provincial Highway 201. It borders the rural municipalities of Emerson-Franklin, Hanover, La Broquerie, and Piney, as well as Kittson and Roseau Counties in Minnesota in the United States.

== History ==
The first Ukrainian immigrants arrived in Winnipeg in July 1896 en route to Stuartburn, which is considered to be the first Ukrainian community in western Canada.

It is also a little-known fact that the first Ukrainian Catholic Church in Canada was established in Stuartburn in 1896 (Ukrainian Catholic Archeparchy of Canada), one kilometre east of Stuartburn. The original burned down, and it took over 20 years to rebuild. During the reconstruction, mass was held wherever available, the hall, barn or the local clergy's house, until the church could be rebuilt. Entirely of wood, the massive eight-sided construction has a 25-foot-wide (7.6 m) and 20-foot-high (6.1 m) dome. Outside on top of the dome is yet another, mini-dome with beautifully crafted wrought iron.
