= Rural Municipality of Thompson =

Rural municipality in Manitoba, Canada

- Rural municipality
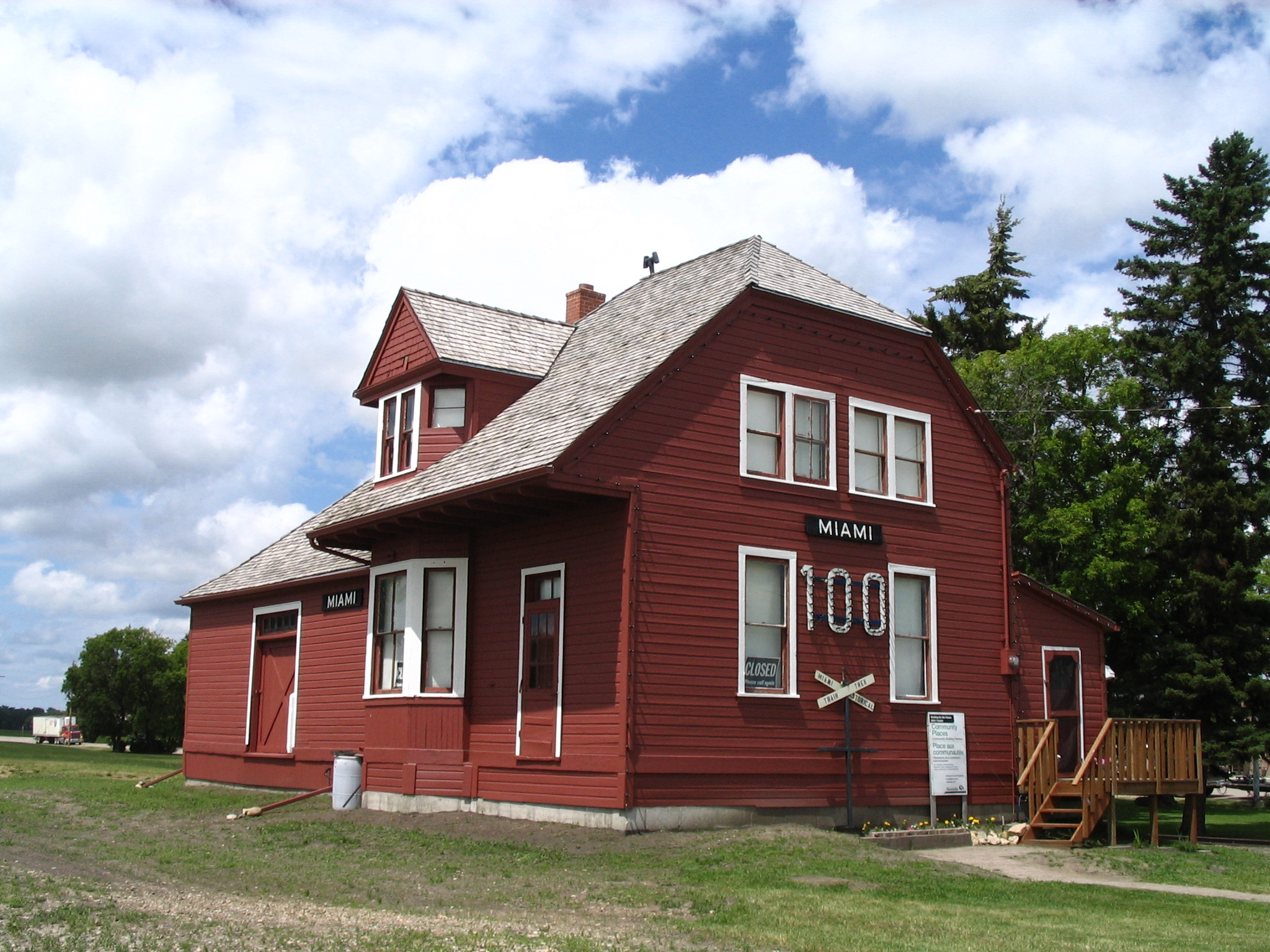
- Miami Railway Station

- Location of the RM of Thompson in Manitoba
- Coordinates: 49°22′37″N 98°14′21″W
- Country: Canada
- Province: Manitoba
- Region: Pembina Valley

Area
  - Land: 531.24 km^{2} (205.11 sq mi)

Population (2021)
  - Total: 1,518
- Time zone: UTC-6 (CST)
  - Summer (DST): UTC-5 (CDT)
- Area codes: 204 and 431
- Website: www.rmofthompson.com

Thompson is a rural municipality (RM) in the Pembina Valley Region of Manitoba, Canada. It had a population of 1,259 according to the Canada 2006 Census.

The RM was incorporated on 1 November 1908. It took its name from an early settler and its first postmaster, William Thompson. Thompson homesteaded on 5-5-6W in about 1874 and his home was central to the early community. The area was known locally as Thompsonville at that time.

== Communities ==
- Deerwood
- Miami - The main village in Thompson.
- Rosebank

== Demographics ==
In the 2021 Census of Population conducted by Statistics Canada, Thompson had a population of 1,518 living in 434 of its 471 total private dwellings, a change of 6.8% from its 2016 population of 1,422. With a land area of 531.24 km^{2} (205.11 sq mi), it had a population density of 2.9/km^{2} (7.4/sq mi) in 2021.
