= Manitoba Highway 23 =

Provincial highway in Manitoba, Canada

Provincial Trunk Highway 23
- Boyne Ave
- PTH 23 highlighted in red

Route information
- Maintained by Department of Infrastructure
- Length: 276 km (171 mi)
- Existed: 1950–present

Major junctions
- West end: PTH 21 near Hartney
- PTH 22 near Elgin; PTH 10 at Minto; PTH 18 at Ninette; PTH 5 near Baldur; PTH 34 at Swan Lake; PTH 3 at Roland; PTH 75 in Morris
- East end: PTH 59 in La Rochelle

Location
- Country: Canada
- Province: Manitoba
- Rural municipalities: Argyle; De Salaberry; Grassland; Lorne; Montcalm; Morris; Prairie View; Roland; Thompson
- Towns: Morris

Highway system
- Provincial highways in Manitoba; Winnipeg City Routes
← PTH 22	→ PTH 24

Provincial Trunk Highway 23 (PTH 23) is a major east–west provincial highway in the southern portion of the Canadian province of Manitoba. It runs from PTH 21 just south of Hartney to PTH 59 in La Rochelle. Along its route, PTH 23 passes through the communities of Elgin, Ninette, Baldur, Miami, Lowe Farm, and Morris.

== Route description ==
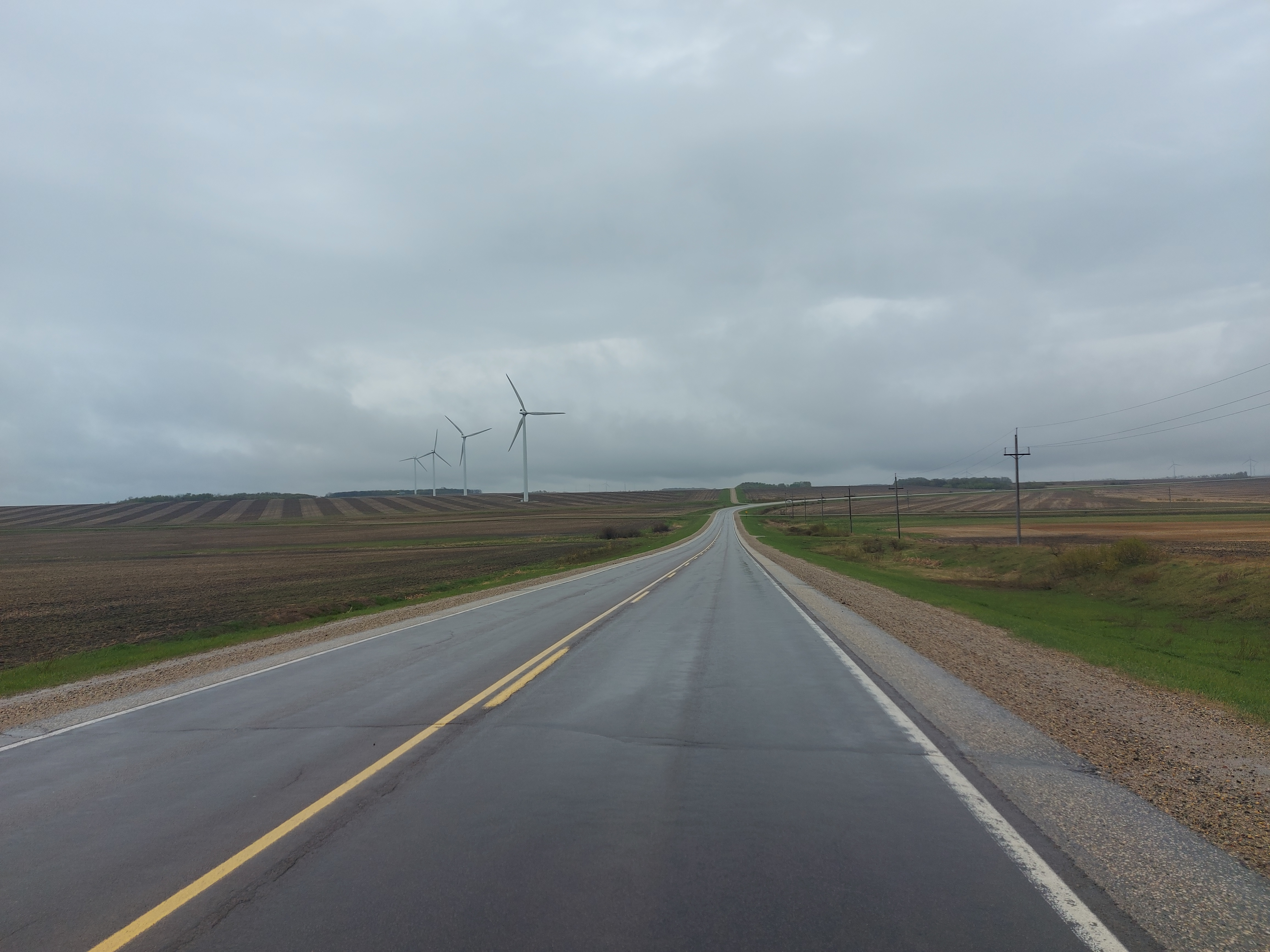
Highway 23 about 4 km (2.5 mi) east of the junction with PR 242

PTH 23 begins in the Rural Municipality of Grassland at an intersection with PTH 21 roughly 3 kilometres (1.9 mi) south of Hartney, just southeast of the remains of the former Hartney Airport. The highway heads due east for several kilometres, crossing several creeks to pass through the town of Elgin along Main Street, having an intersection with PR 448 here. As it leaves Elgin, it has a junction with PTH 22 on the north side of Whitewater Recreation Park, before heading east through farmland for the next several kilometres, passing just north of Fairfax (where it has an intersection with PR 444) to come to an intersection and become concurrent (overlap) with PTH 10 (John Bracken Highway) for the next several kilometres. PTH 23 follows PTH 10 south to Minto, where it splits off and heads due east again to enter the Rural Municipality of Prairie Lakes.

PTH 23 travels along the southern edges of Margaret, where it crosses PR 346, and Dunrea as it meanders its way into the town of Ninette and becoming concurrent with PTH 18. The pair pass through neighbourhoods along the shores of Pelican Lake before making a sharp onto Queen Street and travelling through the centre of downtown, where PTH 23 splits off and heads east along the narrow isthmus separating Pelican Lake from the smaller Grass Lake. PTH 23 leaves Ninette and travels along the southern edge of Belmont, passing through several switchbacks along the way, where it has a junction with PR 458 before crossing into the Rural Municipality of Argyle.

PTH 23 almost immediately has an intersection with PTH 5 (Parks Route) as it heads to pass through the town of Baldur. The highway then goes through a switchback and has a junction with PR 342 at the community of Greenway before crossing into the Rural Municipality of Lorne. PTH 23 goes through several sharp curves for the several kilometres, passing along the eastern edge of Mariapolis and having junctions with PR 440 and PR 532. The highway now travels through the Swan Lake First Nation, where it has an intersection with PTH 34, before passing along the southern edge of the town of Swan Lake. PTH 23 passes by several small lakes as it passes by the communities of Somerset, where it crosses PR 242, St. Leon, crossing PR 244, and Altamont before crossing into the Rural Municipality of Thompson at Deerwood.

PTH 23 goes through a switchback before having a concurrency with PR 240 as it travels past Alexander Ridge Park. Passing through the town of Miami, it has an intersection with PR 338 on its way to travel through Rosebank, having an intersection with PR 432 here and crossing into the Rural Municipality of Roland. The highway crosses a creek several times as it has an intersection with PTH 3 and passes through the village of Roland. Having an intersection with PR 428, it continues east for a few kilometres to pass by Myrtle before having an intersection with PR 306 and entering the Rural Municipality of Morris at Kane.

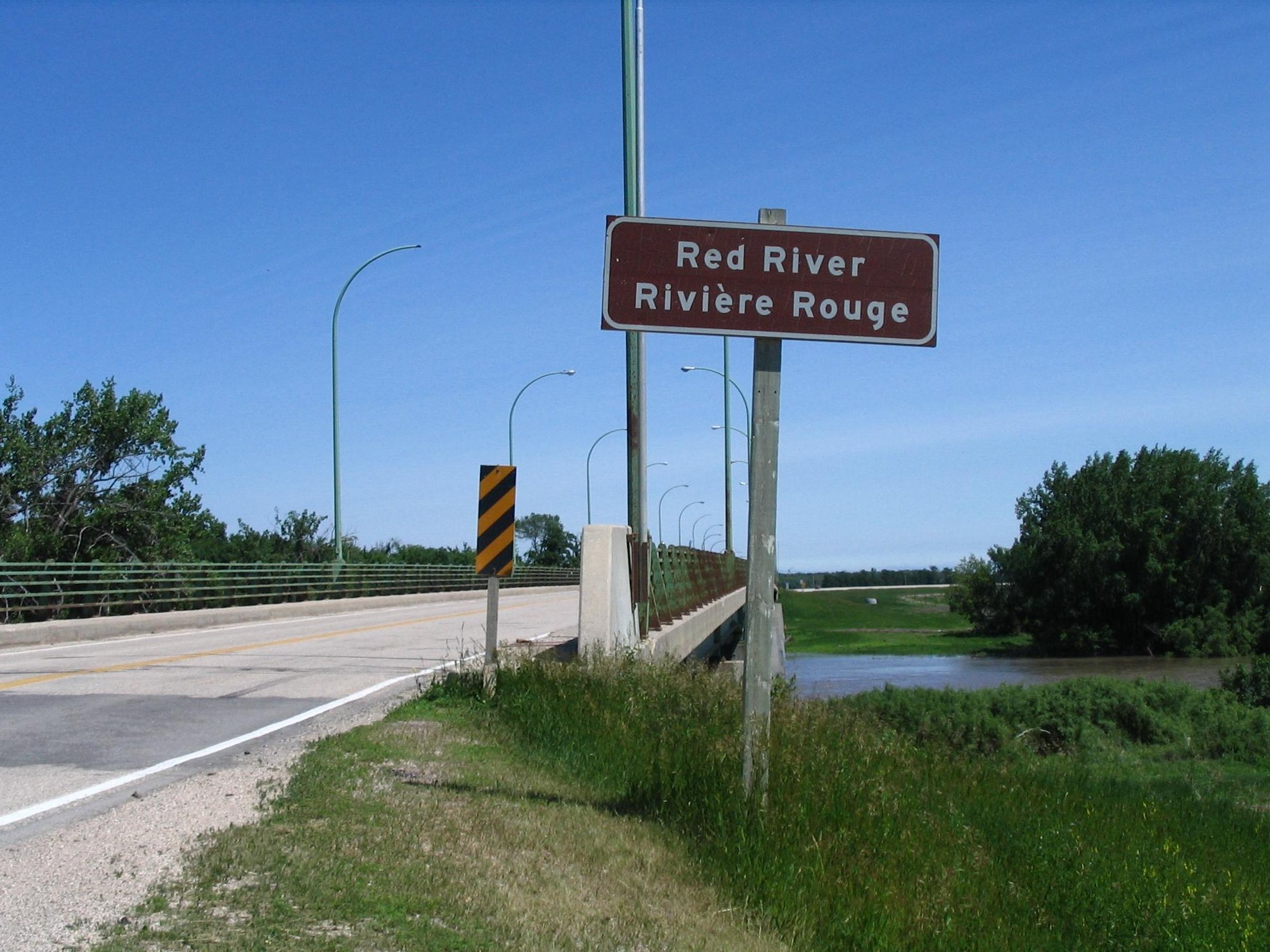
Red River bridge on PTH 23 in Morris

PTH 23 junctions with PR 336 and PR 332 as it passes through Lowe Farm to enter the town of Morris. The highway follows Boyne Avenue as it crosses a couple of railway tracks to pass through neighbourhoods and enter downtown, where it becomes concurrent with PTH 75 (Lord Selkirk Highway / Main Street). They head south through a business district, where PTH 23 splits off along Montreal Avenue to pass through neighbourhoods and cross a bridge over the Red River. PTH 23 goes through a switchback back as it leaves Morris and follows along the border of the Rural Municipality of Montcalm for the next several kilometres, where it has an intersection with PR 246, before crossing into the Rural Municipality of De Salaberry. The highway almost immediately crosses PR 200 and continues due east for the next several kilometres to pass through Dufrost, crossing a railroad line. After a few more kilometres, it crosses a creek before PTH 23 comes to an end at a junction with PTH 59.

With the exclusion of the concurrency with PTH 75 in Morris, which is a four-lane boulevard, the entire length of PTH 23 is a rural, paved, two-lane highway.

== History ==
The original PTH 23 went from Deloraine to Melita. This became part of PTH 3 in 1929.

PTH 23 was designated to its current route in 1950.

When the current route was first added, the highway's western terminus was at PTH 10 near Minto, with the eastern terminus located at PTH 75 in Morris. The highway's eastern terminus was extended to its current location in 1952, and to its current western terminus the following year.

== Major intersections ==
Division	Location	km	mi	Destinations	Notes
Grassland		0	0.0	PTH 21 – Hartney, Deloraine	
Grassland	Elgin	18	11	PR 448 south	
Grassland		20	12	PTH 22 north – Souris	
Grassland		28	17	PR 444 south – Fairfax	former PR 348
Grassland		36	22	PTH 10 north (John Bracken Highway) – Brandon	west end of PTH 10 overlap
Grassland	Minto	41	25	PTH 10 south (John Bracken Highway) – Boissevain	east end of PTH 10 overlap
Prairie Lake		53	33	PR 346 – Margaret, Ninga	
Prairie Lake		63	39	Dunlop Street - Dunrea	former PR 344 north
Prairie Lake		68	42	PTH 18 south – Killarney	west end of PTH 18 overlap
Prairie Lake	Ninette	71	44	PTH 18 north – Wawanesa	east end of PTH 18 overlap
Prairie Lake		87	54	PR 458 south – Pleasant Valley; George Street – Belmont	former PR 340
Argyle		97	60	PTH 5 (Parks Route) – Glenboro, Cartwright	former PR 258
Argyle	Greenway	113	70	PR 342 – Cypress River, Glenora	
Lorne		120	75	PR 440 south – Pilot Mound	
Lorne		126	78	PR 532 north – St. Alphonse	
Lorne				Bruxelles Road (Road 64 West)	former PR 530 north
Swan Lake First Nation		138	86	PTH 34 – Holland, Pilot Mound	
Lorne		151	94	PR 242 – Somerset, La Rivière	
Lorne		156	97	Road 50 West - St. Leon	former PR 431 south
Lorne		159	99	PR 244 – Notre Dame de Lourdes, Manitou	
Thompson		174	108	PR 240 south – Darlingford	west end of PR 240 overlap
Thompson		176	109	PR 240 north – Roseisle	east end of PR 240 overlap
Thompson	Miami	181	112	PR 338 north – Stephenfield	
Thompson		191	119	PR 432 south – Rosebank, Morden	
Roland	Jordan	199	124	PTH 3 – Carman, Winkler, Morden	
Roland	Roland	205	127	PR 428 south – Winkler	
Roland	Myrtle	211	131	Road 17 West	former PR 248 north
Roland		218	135	PR 306 south – Plum Coulee	former PR 248 south
Morris		222	138	PR 336 north – Sperling	
Morris		225	140	Road 9 West	former PR 336 south
Morris	Lowe Farm	230	140	PR 332 north – Brunkild	west end of PR 332 overlap
Morris		234	145	PR 332 south – Rosenfeld	east end of PR 332 overlap
Morris		240	150	PR 422 north (Meridian Road) – Rosenort	
Town of Morris		246	153	PTH 75 north (Main Street) – Winnipeg	west end of PTH 75 overlap
Town of Morris		247	153	PTH 75 south (Main Street) – Emerson	east end of PTH 75 overlap
↑ / ↓		248	154	Crosses over Red River	
Morris / Montcalm		252	157	PR 246 (St. Mary's Road) – Aubigny	
De Salaberry		263	163	PR 200 – St. Adolphe, Dominion City	
De Salaberry				Road 18 East	former PR 400 south
De Salaberry	La Rochelle	276	171	PTH 59 – St-Pierre-Jolys, St. Malo	
1.000 mi = 1.609 km; 1.000 km = 0.621 mi: Concurrency terminus

== Related routes ==
=== Provincial Road 440 ===
Provincial Road 440
- Chemin River Road
- Location: Mariapolis - Pilot Mound
- Length: 19.1 km (11.9 mi)
- Existed: 1966–present

Provincial Road 440 (PR 440), also known as Chemin River Road, is a 19.1-kilometre-long (11.9 mi) north-south spur of PTH 23 in the Pembina Valley Region, providing a connection between the towns of Mariapolis and Pilot Mound.

PR 440 begins in the Municipality of Lorne at an intersection with PTH 23 just west of the town of Mariapolis, heading due south along Road 69W to enter the Rural Municipality of Argyle after a short distance. After passing through the locality of Dry River, the highway makes an abrupt left turn onto Road 19N and descends into a river valley, crossing a bridge over the Pembina River to enter the Municipality of Louise. It climbs back out of the valley before curving back southward through rural farmland for several kilometres before coming to an end at a junction with PR 253 just west of the town of Pilot Mound. The entire length of PR 440 is a gravel two-lane road.

Division	Location	km	mi	Destinations	Notes
Louise		0.0	0.0	PR 253 – Pilot Mound, Glenora	Southern terminus
Louise / Argyle boundary		7.5– 7.6	4.7– 4.7	Bridge over the Pembina River	
Argyle	No major junctions				
Lorne		19.1	11.9	PTH 23 – Baldur, Mariapolis	Northern terminus; road continues north as Road 69W
1.000 mi = 1.609 km; 1.000 km = 0.621 mi

=== Provincial Road 444 ===
Provincial Road 444
- North Avenue
- Location: Fairfax
- Length: 11.5 km (7.1 mi)
- Existed: 1992–present

Provincial Road 444 (PR 444) is a 11.5-kilometre-long (7.1 mi) north-south spur of PTH 23 mostly within the Municipality of Grassland, providing access to the hamlet of Fairfax. In is entirely a two-lane road with the portion between Fairfax and PTH 23 being paved, where it is known as North Avenue, while the rest is composed of gravel.

Prior to 1992, what is now PR 444 was part of a much longer PR 348.

Division	Location	km	mi	Destinations	Notes
Boissevain-Morton		0.0	0.0	PR 343 – Regent, Boissevain	Southern terminus; Former PR 348 south followed PR 343 west
Grassland	Fairfax	10.4	6.5	Front Street	Pavement begins
Grassland		11.5	7.1	PTH 23 – Elgin, Brandon	Northern terminus; road continues north as Road 118W (former PR 348 north)
1.000 mi = 1.609 km; 1.000 km = 0.621 mi

Provincial Road 444
- Lake William Road (Road 112W)
- Location: William Lake Provincial Park
- Length: 8.3 km (5.2 mi)
- Existed: 1966–1992

Prior to 1992, PR 444 was the designation applied to Lake William Road (Road 112W), an 8.3-kilometre-long (5.2 mi) spur of PR 341, providing the only road access to William Lake Provincial Park. Now locally maintained, it is entirely a two-lane gravel road lying within the Municipality of Boissevain-Morton.

=== Provincial Road 532 ===
Provincial Road 532
- Location: Saint Alphonse
- Length: 11.6 km (7.2 mi)
- Existed: 1966–present

Provincial Road 532 (PR 532) is a 11.6-kilometre-long (7.2 mi) north–south spur of PTH 23 in the Municipality of Lorne, providing access to the hamlet of Saint Alphonse. The section between PTH 23 and Saint Alphonse is a paved, two-lane highway while the remainder of the highway to its north end at PR 245 is a gravel, two-lane road. The highway includes a crossing over the Cypress River.

Division	Location	km	mi	Destinations	Notes
Lorne		0.0	0.0	PTH 23 – Swan Lake, Mariapolis	Southern terminus, southern end of paved section
Lorne	Saint Alphonse	4.7	2.9	Northern end of paved section	
Lorne		8.2	5.1	Bridge over the Cypress River	
Lorne		11.6	7.2	PR 245 – Cypress River, Bruxelles	Northern terminus; road continues north as Road 69W
1.000 mi = 1.609 km; 1.000 km = 0.621 mi
