= Manitoba Provincial Road 245 =

Provincial Road in Manitoba, Canada

Provincial Road 245
- PR 245 highlighted in red

Route information
- Maintained by Department of Infrastructure
- Length: 90.2 km (56.0 mi)
- Existed: 1966–present

Major junctions
- West end: PR 342 near Cypress River
- PTH 34 near Bruxelles; PR 242 near Treherne; PR 244 at Notre Dame de Lourdes; PR 240 at Roseisle
- East end: PTH 3 / PTH 13 at Carman

Location
- Country: Canada
- Province: Manitoba
- Rural municipalities: Argyle, Lorne, Victoria, Norfolk Treherne, Dufferin
- Towns: Carman

Highway system
- Provincial highways in Manitoba; Winnipeg City Routes
← PR 244	→ PR 246

Provincial Road 245 (PR 245) is a 90.2-kilometre-long (56.0 mi) east-west highway in the Pembina Valley and Central Plains regions of Manitoba, Canada. It connects the communities of Bruxelles, Notre Dame de Lourdes, Roseisle, and Graysville with the town of Carman. PR 245 also provides access to Stephenfield Provincial Park.

== Route description ==
PR 245 begins as a gravel road in the Rural Municipality of Argyle at an intersection with PR 342 just south of the town of Cypress River. It enters the Municipality of Lorne and heads due east through rural farmland for several kilometres, crossing the Cypress River and have a junction with PR 532 before travelling through the hamlet of Bruxelles along Main Street, where it goes through a couple of sharp curves and becomes paved. The highway heads east, travelling past Lake Eleven before becoming concurrent (overlapped) with PTH 34 northbound for roughly 5 kilometres (3.1 mi). PR 245 splits off unpaved once more and heads east along the border with the Rural Municipality of Victoria, having an intersection with PR 449, before travelling along the border with the Rural Municipality of Norfolk Treherne, having a short concurrency with PR 242 at Pinkerton Lakes where it becomes paved again.

PR 245 fully re-enters the Municipality of Lorne as it enters the town of Notre Dame de Lourdes, travelling straight through downtown along Notre Dame Avenue before joining PR 244, going through a switchback as they head south to leave town, with PR 245 splitting off and heading east near Cardinal. The highway goes through a few curves as it enters the Rural Municipality of Dufferin, travelling through Roseisle (where it has a short concurrency with PR 240) before passing by Stephenfield Provincial Park. Passing through the hamlet of Stephenfield, it has a junction with PR 338 before crossing the Boyne River and passing through Graysville. PR 245 winds its way back and forth for the next several kilometres to enter the town of Carman, travelling past neighbourhoods and golf courses as it crosses the Boyne River three more times to enter downtown along 4th Avenue SW, coming to an end at an intersection between PTH 3 and PTH 13 (Main Street S / 4th Avenue SE). The entire length of Provincial Road 245 is a two-lane highway.

== History ==
Prior to 1992, PR 245 extended west another 16.3 kilometres (10.1 mi) past PR 342 to an intersection with PTH 5 (Parks Route) just south of Glenboro.

== Major intersections ==
Division	Location	km	mi	Destinations	Notes
Argyle		0.0	0.0	PR 342 – Cypress River, Glenora	Western terminus; western end of unpaved section
Lorne		2.7	1.7	Bridge over the Cypress River	
Lorne		6.5	4.0	PR 532 south – St. Alphonse	Northern terminus of PR 532
Lorne	Bruxelles	13.7	8.5	Main Street	Eastern end of unpaved section
Lorne	Bruxelles	14.7	9.1	Road 64W	Former PR 530 south
Lorne		19.7	12.2	PTH 34 south – Pilot Mound	Western end PTH 34 concurrency
Lorne		24.5	15.2	PTH 34 north – Holland	Eastern end of PTH 34 concurrency; western end of unpaved section
Victoria–Norfolk Treherne-Lorne boundary		32.5	20.2	PR 449 west	Eastern terminus of PR 449
Norfolk Treherne–Lorne boundary		35.8	22.2	PR 242 north – Treherne	Western end of PR 242 concurrency; eastern end of unpaved section
Norfolk Treherne–Lorne boundary		37.9	23.5	PR 242 south – Somerset	Eastern end of PR 242 concurrency
Lorne	Notre Dame de Lourdes	45.7	28.4	PR 244 north – Rathwell	Western end of PR 244 concurrency
Lorne		49.1	30.5	PR 244 south – Manitou	Eastern end of PR 244 concurrency
Dufferin	Roseisle	64.2	39.9	PR 240 north – St. Claude; Hillview Road – Roseisle	Western end of PR 240 concurrency
Dufferin		65.9	40.9	PR 240 south – Darlingford	Eastern end of PR 240 concurrency
Dufferin		67.5	41.9	Road 37W – Stephenfield Provincial Park	Access road into park
Dufferin	Stephenfield	70.8	44.0	PR 338 – Haywood, Miami	
Dufferin		74.0	46.0	Bridge over the Boyne River	
Dufferin	Graysville	77.5	48.2	Road 31W – Graysville	
Dufferin		87.9	54.6	Bridge over the Boyne River	
Town of Carman		89.0	55.3	Bridge over the Boyne River	
Town of Carman		89.9	55.9	Bridge over the Boyne River	
Town of Carman		90.2	56.0	PTH 3 (Main Street S / 4th Avenue SE) – Morden, Winkler, Sperling; PTH 13 north (Main Street S) – Elm Creek	Eastern terminus; southern terminus of PTH 13; road continues as PTH 3 eastbound (4th Avenue SE)
1.000 mi = 1.609 km; 1.000 km = 0.621 mi: Concurrency terminus
