= List of school districts in Manitoba =

This is a list of school divisions in Manitoba, and does not include locally-controlled band-operated schools, which are funded and regulated by the federal Government of Canada.

The province's school divisions and districts are generally categorized by region: Central, Northern/Remote, Parkland/Westman, Southeast/Interlake, and Winnipeg. The one exception is Division Scolaire Franco-Manitobaine, which has French-language schools distributed across the regions.

== Overview ==
The province's school divisions and districts are generally categorized by region: Central, Northern/Remote, Parkland/Westman, Southeast/Interlake, and Winnipeg.

Education in Manitoba falls under the purview of the Minister of Education and is primarily governed by The Public Schools Act and The Education Administration Act, as well as their respective regulations. Locally-controlled Manitoba Band Operated Schools are funded and regulated by the federal Government of Canada.

In 2019/2020, Manitoba had:

- 690 public schools
- 613 elementary schools
- 301 secondary schools
- 625 English-only schools
- 114 French immersion schools
- 26 French-only (Français) schools
- 17 bilingual schools with international languages
- 3 bilingual schools with Indigenous languages
- Total of 13,786 teachers
- Total enrolment of 186,372

== Central region ==
Division/district	Office	Communities	# of schools
Garden Valley School Division	Winkler	Plum Coulee, Schanzenfeld, and Winkler	14
Pine Creek School Division	Gladstone	Austin, Gladstone, Langruth, MacGregor, and Plumas	14
Portage la Prairie School Division	Portage la Prairie	Oakville and Portage la Prairie	18
Prairie Rose School Division	Carman	Elie, Elm Creek, Miami, Roland, St. Eustache, St. François Xavier, and St. Laurent	26
Prairie Spirit School Division	Swan Lake	Baldur, Bruxelles, Cartwright, Crystal City, Darlingford, Glenboro, Holland, Manitou, Notre-Dame-de-Lourdes, Pilot Mound, Portage la Prairie (Fairholme and New Rosedale Colonies), Rathwell, Somerset, St. Claude, Swan Lake, and Treherne	29
Western School Division	Morden	Morden	4

== Northern/Remote region ==
Division/district	Office	Communities	# of schools
Flin Flon School Division	Flin Flon	Flin Flon	4
Frontier School Division	Winnipeg	Barrows Junction, Bissett, Brochet, Camperville, Churchill, Cormorant, Cranberry Portage, Cross Lake, Duck Bay, Falcon Lake, Gillam, Gods Lake Narrows, Grand Rapids, Gypsumville, Ilford, Leaf Rapids, Lynn Lake, Matheson Island, Norway House, Pikwitonei, Rorketon, Sherridon, Snow Lake, St. Martin, Steventon Island, Thicket Portage, Wabowden, and Waterhen	30
Kelsey School Division	The Pas	The Pas	5
Mystery Lake School District	Thompson	Thompson	7

== Parkland/Westman region ==
Division/district	Office	Communities	# of schools
Beautiful Plains School Division	Neepawa	Birnie, Brookdale, Carberry, Douglas, Eden, and Neepawa	15
Brandon School Division	Brandon	Alexander, Brandon, and Shilo	24
Fort La Bosse School Division	Virden	Elkhorn, Kola, Oak Lake, Reston, and Virden	10
Mountain View School Division	Dauphin	Ethelbert, Dauphin, Gilbert Plains, Grandview, Ochre River, Roblin, and Winnipegosis	16
Park West School Division	Birtle	Binscarth, Birtle, Decker, Foxwarren, Hamiota, Inglis, Miniota, Rossburn, Russell, Shoal Lake, and Strathclair	14
Rolling River School Division	Minnedosa	Alexander (Deerboine Colony), Douglas, Erickson, Forrest, Justice, Minnedosa, Newdale, Oak River, Onanole, Rapid City, and Rivers	17
Southwest Horizon School Division	Souris	Carroll, Deloraine, Hartney, Lauder, Melita, Pierson, Souris, Waskada, and Wawanesa	13
Swan Valley School Division	Swan River	Benito, Bowsman, Minitonas, and Swan River	7
Turtle Mountain School Division	Killarney	Boissevain, Killarney, Margaret, and Minto	7
Turtle River School Division	McCreary	Alonsa, Glenella, Laurier, McCreary, Riding Mountain, and Sainte Rose du Lac	7

== Southeast/Interlake region ==
Division/district	Office	Communities	# of schools
Border Land School Division	Altona	Altona, Dominion City, Emerson, Gretna, Piney, Rosenfeld, Sprague, and Vita	16
Evergreen School Division	Gimli	Arborg, Gimli, Riverton, and Winnipeg Beach	8
Hanover School Division	Steinbach	Blumenort, Grunthal, Kleefeld, Landmark, Mitchell, New Bothwell, Niverville, Steinbach, and Ste. Agathe	19
Interlake School Division	Stonewall	Argyle, Balmoral, Grosse Isle, Rosser, Stonewall, Stony Mountain, Teulon, Warren, and Woodlands	22
Lakeshore School Division	Eriksdale	Moosehorn, Ashern, Eriksdale, Lundar, Inwood, and Fisher Branch	10
Lord Selkirk School Division	Selkirk	Clandeboye, Grand Marais, Libau, Lockport, Petersfield, Selkirk, St. Andrews, and Victoria Beach	15
Red River Valley School Division	Morris	Brunkild, Domain, Dufrost, Homewood Colony, Lowe Farm, Morris, Oak Bluff, Oak Bluff Colony, Osborne, Otterburne, Rosenort, Ste. Agathe, St. Jean Baptiste, St. Malo, St. Pierre-Jolys, Sanford, Starbuck, Suncrest Colony, and Vermillion Colony	14
Seine River School Division	Lorette	La Salle, Île des Chênes, Lorette, La Broquerie, Richer, St. Adolphe, St. Norbert, and Ste. Anne	15
Sunrise School Division	Beausejour	Anola, Beausejour, Dugald, Garson, Hazelridge, Lac du Bonnet, Oakbank, Powerview-Pine Falls, Tyndall, and Whitemouth	19
Whiteshell School District	Pinawa	Pinawa	2

== Winnipeg region and other ==
Division/district	Office	Communities	# of schools
Winnipeg
Louis Riel School Division	St. Mary's Rd	St. Boniface and St. Vital	40
Pembina Trails School Division	Henlow Bay	Assiniboine South and Fort Garry	34
River East Transcona School Division	Roch St.	River East (North and East Kildonan), East St. Paul, and Transcona	42
Seven Oaks School Division	Powers St.	Seven Oaks and West St. Paul	25
St. James-Assiniboia School Division	Portage Ave.	St. James-Assiniboia	26
Winnipeg School Division	Wall St.	Winnipeg Centre (Downtown, Point Douglas) and River Heights	80
Other
Division Scolaire Franco-Manitobaine	Lorette	This division has schools distributed across the regions in Manitoba: Île-des-Chênes, La Broquerie, Laurier, Lorette, Notre-Dame-de-Lourdes, St. Claude, St. Georges, St. Jean Baptiste, St. Laurent, St. Lazare, St. Norbert, St-Pierre-Jolys, Ste. Agathe, Ste. Anne, Shilo, Thompson, and Winnipeg.	23
