= Rural Municipality of Lorne =

Rural municipality in Manitoba, Canada

Coordinates: 49°26′37″N 98°44′58″W

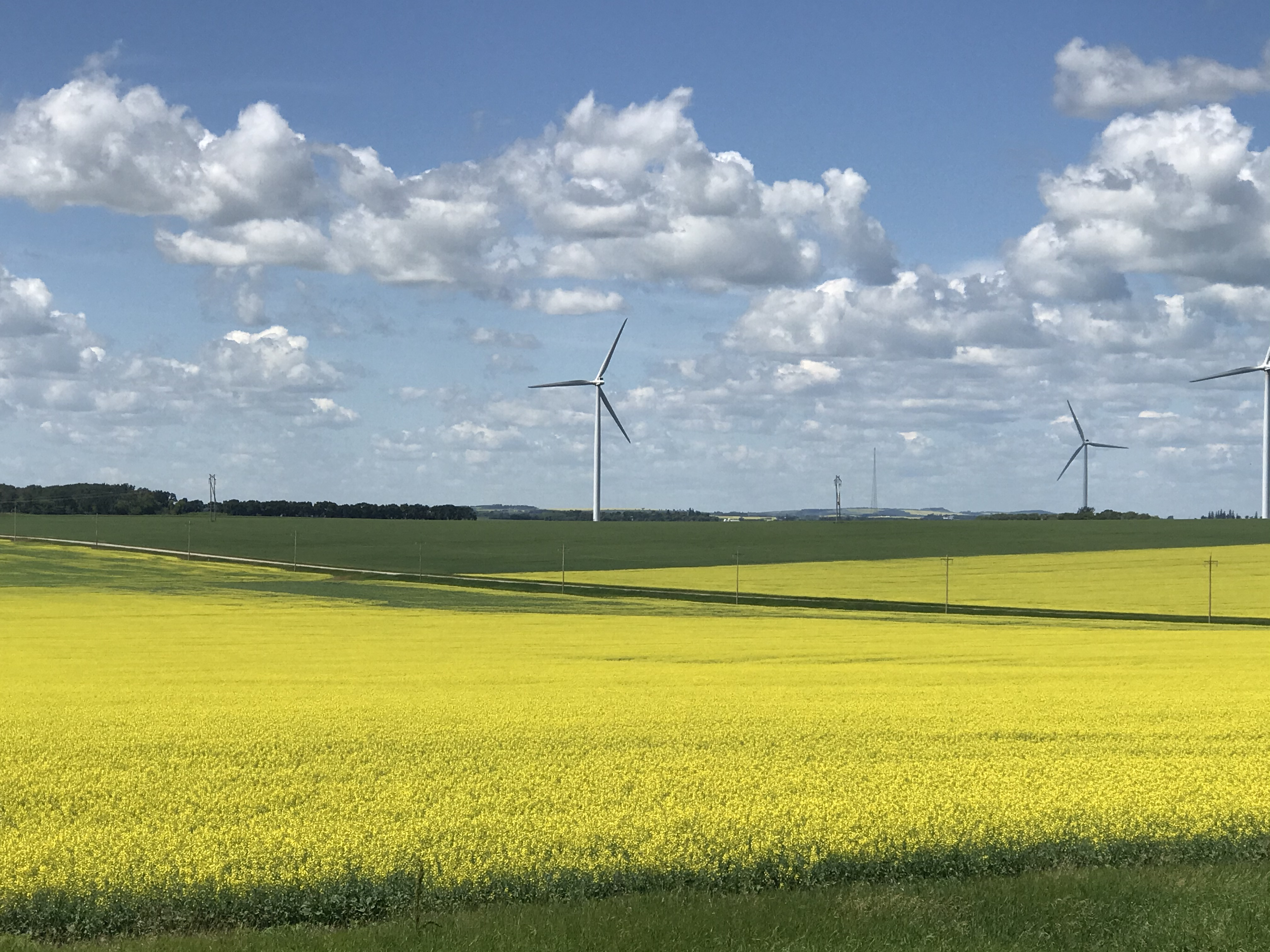
Canola fields in Lorne

The Municipality of Lorne is a former rural municipality (RM) in the Canadian province of Manitoba. It was originally incorporated as a rural municipality on February 14, 1880. It ceased on January 1, 2015 as a result of its provincially mandated amalgamation with the Village of Notre Dame de Lourdes and the Village of Somerset to form the Municipality of Lorne.

The main reserve of the Swan Lake First Nation is located within the former RM.

== Communities ==
- Altamont
- Bruxelles
- Cardinal
- Mariapolis
- St. Alphonse
- St. Leon
- St. Lupicin
- Swan Lake
