= Manitoba Provincial Road 244 =

Provincial Road in Manitoba, Canada

Provincial Road 244
- PR 244 highlighted in red

Route information
- Maintained by Department of Infrastructure
- Length: 46.2 km (28.7 mi)
- Existed: 1966–present

Major junctions
- South end: PTH 3 in Manitou
- PTH 23 near Altamont; PR 245 in Notre Dame de Lourdes
- North end: PTH 2 in Rathwell

Location
- Country: Canada
- Province: Manitoba
- Rural municipalities: Pembina, Lorne, Norfolk Treherne

Highway system
- Provincial highways in Manitoba; Winnipeg City Routes
← PR 243	→ PR 245

Provincial Road 244 (PR 244) is a 46.2-kilometre-long (28.7 mi) north–south highway in the Pembina Valley and Central Plains regions of Manitoba. It serves as a connection between Manitou, Notre Dame de Lourdes, and Rathwell.

== Route description ==
PR 244 begins in the town of Manitou at an intersection with PTH 3 (Boundary Commission Trail) within the Municipality of Pembina. It travels along the western edge of town before crossing a railroad track, leaving Manitou and heading north through rural farmland for the next several kilometres, crossing a small lake via a causeway (Lac Rondeau) just prior to entering the Municipality of Lorne. The highway almost immediately has an intersection with PTH 23, roughly halfway between St. Leon and Altamont, as it continues north through farmland for the next several kilometres. PR 244 travels past Cardinal before becoming concurrent (overlapped) with PR 245, entering the town of Notre Dame de Lourdes shortly thereafter. The highway goes through a switchback as it travels through a business district and neighbourhoods on the eastern edge of town, with PR 245 splitting off and heading into downtown. PR 244 now leaves Notre Dame de Lourdes and immediately enters the Municipality of Norfolk Treherne, continuing north through areas for several kilometres before entering the town of Rathwell, crossing a railroad track and traversing the western edge of town to come to an end at an intersection with PTH 2 (Red Coat Trail). The entire length of Provincial Road 244 is a paved two-lane highway.

== Major intersections ==
Division	Location	km	mi	Destinations	Notes
Pembina	Manitou	0.0	0.0	PTH 3 (Boundary Commission Trail) – Morden, La Rivière	Southern terminus; road continues as 11th Street
Lorne		16.4	10.2	PTH 23 – Somerset, Altamont	
Lorne		28.7	17.8	Railway Avenue – Cardinal	Access road into Cardinal
Lorne		29.6	18.4	PR 245 east – Carman, Roseisle	Southern end of PR 245 concurrency
Lorne	Notre Dame de Lourdes	33.0	20.5	PR 245 west (Notre Dame Avenue) – Bruxelles, Downtown	Northern end of PR 245 concurrency
Norfolk Treherne	Rathwell	46.2	28.7	PTH 2 (Red Coat Trail) – Treherne, St. Claude	Northern terminus; road continues as Town Line
1.000 mi = 1.609 km; 1.000 km = 0.621 mi: Concurrency terminus
