= Manitoba Provincial Road 338 =

Provincial Road in Manitoba, Canada

Provincial Road 338
- PR 338 highlighted in red

Route information
- Maintained by Department of Infrastructure
- Length: 25.0 km (15.5 mi)
- Existed: 1966–present

Major junctions
- South end: PTH 23 in Miami
- PR 245 in Stephenfield
- North end: PR 305 near Haywood

Location
- Country: Canada
- Province: Manitoba
- Rural municipalities: Thompson, Dufferin

Highway system
- Provincial highways in Manitoba; Winnipeg City Routes
← PR 336	→ PR 340

Provincial Road 338 (PR 338) is a 25.0-kilometre-long (15.5 mi) north–south gravel road in the Pembina Valley Region of southern Manitoba, Canada. It connects the hamlets of Miami, Stephenfield, and indirectly, Haywood.

== Route description ==
PR 338 begins in the Rural Municipality of Thompson at an intersection with PTH 23 in the town of Miami, with the road continuing south as Road 35W towards Thornhill. It heads due north as a two-lane gravel road along the western side of town before leaving Miami and travelling through rural farmland for several kilometres. Entering the Rural Municipality of Dufferin, the highway crosses both PR 245 and the Boyne River as it passes through the hamlet of Stephenfield before narrowing to one lane as it continues north through rural areas. PR 338 traverses a switchback before coming to an end at an intersection with PR 305, as Road 35W continues on for six kilometres (3.7 mi) to both PTH 2 (Red Coat Trail) and Haywood.

== History ==
PR 338 is currently a shadow of its former self, previously stretching for 96.2 kilometres (59.8 mi) from Thornhill to just west of Newton, including both the current route plus a long concurrency (overlap) with PTH 2 (Red Coat Trail) through Haywood. In 1992, like many other highways across the province, much of PR 338 was decommissioned and turned over to local control, leaving only the Miami to PR 305 section to remain.

== Major intersections ==
Division	Location	km	mi	Destinations	Notes
Thompson	Miami	0.0	0.0	PTH 23 – Roland, Altamont; Road 35W – Thornhill	Southern terminus; road continues south as Road 35W; Road 35W was formerly PR 338 south
Thompson	Miami	0.1	0.062	Norton Avenue – Miami	
Dufferin	Stephenfield	14.8	9.2	PR 245 – Roseisle, Carman	
Dufferin	Stephenfield	15.8	9.8	Bridge over the Boyne River	
Dufferin		25.0	15.5	PR 305 – St. Claude, Brunkild; Road 35W to PTH 2 (Red Coat Trail) – Haywood	Northern terminus; road continues north as Road 35W; Road 35W was formerly PR 338 north
1.000 mi = 1.609 km; 1.000 km = 0.621 mi
