= Léandre Bergeron =

Canadian playwright and writer (1933–2025)

- Born: 1933; St. Lupicin, Manitoba, Canada
- Died: July 31, 2025 (aged 91)
- Education: Université de Saint-Boniface; University of Manitoba; Aix-Marseille University
- Occupations: Writer, historian, comics writer
- Known for: Petit manuel d'histoire du Québec
- Relatives: Henri Bergeron (brother)

Léandre Bergeron (French: [leɑ̃dʁ bɛʁʒʁɔ̃]; 1933 – July 31, 2025) was a Canadian writer, historian and linguist.

== Early life ==
Léandre Bergeron was born in St. Lupicin, Manitoba, in 1933, the eighth child of his French mother and French-Canadian father.

After first completing a Bachelor of Arts at the French-language Université de Saint-Boniface, he studied at the University of Manitoba in 1956, graduating with a Bachelor of Education. For a short time afterwards, he was a teacher at a high school. Having received a scholarship from the French government in 1959, he left his teaching position and travelled to France to study at Aix-Marseille University, where he completed his doctorate on Paul Valéry.

== Career ==
After returning to Canada, he became an assistant professor at the Royal Military College of Canada in Kingston, Ontario. Three years later, he taught at Sir George Williams University in Montreal, modern-day Concordia University. During this time, he was involved with the Marxist Parti pris magazine, the Socialist Party of Quebec, and the prolific Québécois writer, Victor-Lévy Beaulieu. Beaulieu would go on to create multiple different publishing houses, including Éditions de l'Aurore, VLB Éditeur, and Éditions Trois-Pistoles, all of which would publish books by Bergeron.

Bergeron wrote several works, most notably a dictionary of the Québécois language, as well as historical manifests calling for radical sociopolitical changes in Quebec. The first of these was Petit manuel d'histoire du Québec (A Short Guide to the History of Quebec), which critically summarized the history of Quebec through the lens of class struggle and national liberation, paying particular attention to the role of the clergy. The book was claimed to have sold more than 125,000 copies, making it a best-seller in Canada. He translated a few of these works into English, seeking to expose the anglophone world to the Québécois perspective and provide an answer to the question "What does Quebec want?".

In 1971, Bergeron wrote the script for Histoire du Québec, a graphic novel drawn by Robert Lavaill.

== Later life and death ==
Bergeron later lived in western Quebec in the region of Abitibi-Temiscamingue. He died on July 31, 2025, at the age of 91.

== Bibliography ==
- Petit manuel d'histoire du Québec (in French). Montreal: Éditions Québécoises. 1970.
- The History of Quebec, a Patriote's Handbook. Toronto: NC Press. 1971.
- Pourquoi une révolution au Québec (in French). Montreal: Éditions Québécoises. 1972.
- L'histoire du Québec en trois régimes (in French). Montréal: Éditions de l'Aurore. 1974.
- The history of Québec. 1975.
- Dictionnaire de la langue québécoise (in French). Montreal: VLB Éditeur. 1980.
- Dictionnaire de la langue québécoise : supplément (in French). Montreal: VLB Éditeur. 1981.
- La Charte de la langue québécoise (in French). 1981.
- Petit manuel de l'accouchement à la maison (in French). Montreal: VLB Éditeur. 1982.
- Sur la question nationale (in French). 1982.
- The Québécois Dictionary. Toronto: James Lorimer & Company. 1982.
- L'action consciente en vue d'instaurer le paradis terrestre (in French). 1994.
- L'histoire du Québec illustrée : Tome 1 Le régime français (in French). Illustrated by Robert Lavaill. Éditions Québécoises. 1971.
- L'histoire du Québec illustrée : Tome 2 La conquête (in French). Illustrated by Robert Lavaill. Éditions Québécoises. 1973.
- Comme des invitées de marque (in French). Trois-Pistoles. 2002.
- Petit manuel d'histoire du Québec, 1534-2008 (in French). Trois-Pistoles. 2008.
- Le Big Bang est une flatulence : Pour une cosmologie autre (in French). Éditions du Québécois. 2019.

== See also ==
- Quebec comics
