= Boyne River (Manitoba) =

- Location of the mouth of the Boyne River in Manitoba.

Location
- Country: Canada
- Province: Manitoba
- Region: Central Plains, Pembina Valley

Physical characteristics
- Source: Field
  - location: Municipality of Norfolk Treherne
  - coordinates: 49°32′43″N 98°37′08″W
  - elevation: 465 m (1,526 ft)
- Mouth
  - location: Macdonald
  - coordinates: 49°34′30″N 97°34′30″W
  - elevation: 235 m (771 ft)
- Length: 125 km (78 mi)

Basin features
- River system: Hudson Bay drainage basin
- Tributaries
  - right: Roseisle Creek

The Boyne River is a river in the Hudson Bay drainage basin in the Central Plains and Pembina Valley Regions of Manitoba, Canada.

== Course ==
The river begins in the Pembina Hills in a field in the Rural Municipality of South Norfolk in Central Plains Region, about 4.5 kilometres (2.8 mi) northwest of the village of Notre-Dame-de-Lourdes. It flows northwest to the town of Treherne on Manitoba Highway 2, continues 5 kilometres (3 mi) north, then turns east. It passes to the north and east of the community of Rathwell, as it heads south under Manitoba Highway 2. The river turns southeast into the Rural Municipality of Dufferin in Pembina Valley Region, and reaches Stephenfield Lake, where it takes in the right tributary Roseisle Creek. Stephenfield Provincial Recreation Park is located on the lake. The Boyne heads east through the town of Carman, turns northeast, then heads east through the Norquay Channel, passing under Manitoba Highway 3 just before reaching its mouth at the Morris River in the Rural Municipality of Macdonald, Central Plains Region, about 2 kilometres (1.2 mi) south of the community of Brunkild. The Morris River flows via the Red River of the North and eventually the Nelson River to Hudson Bay.

== Municipalities ==
- Rural Municipality of Macdonald
- Carman
- Rural Municipality of Dufferin
- Rural Municipality of Norfolk Treherne

== Tributaries ==
- Roseisle Creek (right)

== See also ==
- List of rivers of Manitoba
