= Boundary Trail Railway =

Railway line in Manitoba, Canada

Boundary Trail Railway Company

Overview
- Headquarters: Manitou, Manitoba
- Reporting mark: BTR
- Locale: Manitoba
- Dates of operation: 2009–

Technical
- Track gauge: 4 ft 8 1/2 in (1,435 mm) standard gauge

The Boundary Trail Railway Company (reporting mark BTR) is a Canadian short line railway company operating in southern Manitoba. In 2009, the railway purchased 37 kilometres (23 mi) of operational railway linking Morden, Manitoba to the Binney Siding (4 kilometres [2.5 mi] northwest of Manitou), as well as 89 kilometres (55 mi) of abandoned railway from Binney Siding to the Pembina Valley, and on to Holmfield (east of Killarney). Since March 2016, it has also operated with trackage rights on Canadian Pacific Railway's La Riviere sub between Morden and Rosenfeld.

The railway was formed through the investment of CAD$1.25 million by a consortium of about 80 area farmers, the rural municipality of Pembina, Mission Terminal and the provincial government. Originally focused on the transport of wheat, the railway was also in discussion with Quaker Oats to transport oats.

In 2010, after its first year of operation, the railway received the Capturing Opportunities Economic Development Innovation award.

The railway interlines with Canadian Pacific Railway at Rosenfeld in the Municipality of Rhineland.
