= List of local urban districts in Manitoba =

A local urban district is a type of unincorporated community within the Canadian province of Manitoba. According to The Municipal Act, a local urban district is a locality wholly within a rural municipality that "has at least 250 residents and a population density of at least 400 residents per square kilometre or such other density as the minister may in a specific case consider sufficient for the type and level of services to be provided in the local urban district". The Local Urban Districts Regulation designates 65 unincorporated communities in Manitoba as local urban districts.

== List ==
Name	Rural municipality	Population (2016)	Population (2006)	Change (%)	Land area (km^{2})	Population density (per km^{2})
Alexander	Whitehead	334	340	−1.8	1.37	244.2
Alonsa	Alonsa					
Altamont	Lorne					
Amaranth	Alonsa					
Angusville	Riding Mountain West					
Ashern	West Interlake	565	609	−7.2	3.07	184
Austin	North Norfolk	422	403	4.7	1.9	222.1
Baldur	Argyle	320	337	−5	2.21	144.9
Belmont	Prairie Lakes					
Benito	Swan Valley West	370	377	−1.9	0.86	429.9
Birch River	Mountain	198	235	−15.7	1.87	105.6
Blumenort	Hanover	1,675	1,404	19.3	3.18	526.3
Clearwater	Louise					
Cranberry Portage	Kelsey	771	630	22.4	8.89	86.7
Crystal City	Louise	389	384	1.3	2.8	138.9
Cypress River	Victoria					
Darlingford	Pembina					
Elgin	Grassland					
Elie	Cartier	696	562	23.8	8	87
Elkhorn	Wallace – Woodworth	479	471	1.7	2.8	171.1
Elm Creek	Grey	339	336	0.9	2.69	126.2
Emerson	Emerson – Franklin	678	661	2.6	8.57	79.1
Fisher Branch	Fisher	452	460	−1.7	2.05	220.8
Grunthal	Hanover	1,680	1,640	2.4	2.83	593.7
Haywood	Grey					
Holland	Victoria	712	353	101.7	2.71	262.7
Inglis	Riding Mountain West					
Kelwood	Rosedale					
Kenton	Wallace – Woodworth					
Kleefeld	Hanover					
La Broquerie	La Broquerie	1,401	1,073	30.6	8.05	174.1
La Riviere	Pembina	208	174	19.5	3.06	68
Landmark	Taché	1,292	1,326	−2.6	2.98	433.4
Lorette	Taché	3,208	2,580	24.3	4.68	685
Lundar	Coldwell	462	496	−6.9	1.04	446.2
Mafeking	Mountain					
Mariapolis	Lorne					
Mather	Cartwright – Roblin					
Miami	Thompson	434	435	−0.2	1.2	362.2
Minto	Grassland					
Mitchell	Hanover	2,279	1,656	37.6	3.23	704.7
New Bothwell	Hanover					
Newdale	Harrison Park					
Ninette	Prairie Lakes	221	224	−1.3	1.92	115.4
Ninga	Killarney-Turtle Mountain					
Notre Dame de Lourdes	Lorne	744	683	8.9	2.58	288.2
Oak River	Oakview					
Ochre River	Lakeshore					
Pierson	Two Borders	190	209	−9.1	1.94	97.8
Pilot Mound	Louise	627	635	−1.3	2.65	236.8
Pine River	Mountain					
Plumas	WestLake – Gladstone	243	227	7	0.97	251.4
Rapid City	Oakview	478	417	14.6	5.29	90.3
Reston	Pipestone	569	550	3.5	5.34	106.6
Richer	Ste. Anne	582	504	15.5	5.36	108.5
Rosenfeld	Rhineland	338	348	−2.9	2.72	124.1
Rosenort	Morris	701	572	22.6	10.73	65.4
Sandy Lake	Harrison Park	264	261	1.1	2.06	127.9
Somerset	Lorne	437	439	−0.5	2.45	178.2
St. Claude	Grey	603	590	2.2	1.81	333.9
St. Jean Baptiste	Montcalm	563	552	2	2.12	265.6
St. Leon	Lorne					
St. Malo	De Salaberry	1,227	1,148	6.9	7.34	167.1
Swan Lake	Lorne	255	259	−1.5	0.72	353.8
Tyndall-Garson	Brokenhead	1,582	1,313	20.5	3.15	502.2
Vita	Stuartburn	479	415	15.4	3.05	156.8
Warren	Woodlands	818	798	2.5	5.38	152

== See also ==
- List of municipalities in Manitoba
  - List of cities in Manitoba
  - List of towns in Manitoba
  - List of villages in Manitoba
  - List of rural municipalities in Manitoba
- List of communities in Manitoba
- List of designated places in Manitoba
- List of population centres in Manitoba
