= Swan Lake First Nation =

- Band No. 293
- People: Ojibway
- Treaty: Treaty 1 - seventh signatories

Land
- Main reserve: Swan Lake 7
- Reserves: Indian Reserves 7A, 8, and 8A
- Land area: 65.40 km^{2} (25.25 sq mi)

Population (2021)
- On reserve: 408
- Off reserve: 1053
- Total population: 1461

Government
- Chief: Jason Daniels
- Council: Jason Daniels, Leslie Hobson-Wilson, Ron Swain, and Sean D. McKinney, Benson Martin, Mark K.

Website
- swanlakefirstnation.com

The Swan Lake First Nation (Ojibwe: Gaa-biskigamaag, meaning The lake that is curved) is an Ojibway Annishinabe Band Government located in the Lorne Municipality (Manitoba) Swan Lake First Nation and the Pembina Valley Region of Manitoba, Canada.

Its main reserve is Swan Lake 7, which is surrounded by the Municipality of Lorne; the First Nation also has economic initiatives located at their reserve nearby the Rural Municipality of Headingley (IR 8A).

== Reserve lands ==
Swan Lake 7
- Indian reserve
- Interactive map of Swan Lake 7
- Coordinates: 49.3858131°N 98.9550057°W

Area
  - Land: 27.72 km^{2} (10.70 sq mi)

Population (2016)
  - Total: 347

Swan Lake First Nation divided into 4 reserve lands:

- Swan Lake 7 (IR 7) — surrounded by the Municipality of Lorne (Swan Lake); totalling 36.35 km^{2} (8,982 acres) in size, this is the First Nation's main reserve
- Forest Hills (IR 7a) — located by Carberry; totalling 26.36 km^{2} (6,514 acres) in size, it consists of residential and commercial developments
- Indian Gardens (IR 8) — located by Rathwell; totalling 2.6 km^{2} (640 acres) in size, most (75%) of this land is under agricultural lease
- Headingley (IR 8a) — located by the RM of Headingley; totalling 100,000 m^{2} (25 acres) in size, this location is planned to consist of mainly commercial developments
