= St. Jean Baptiste, Manitoba =

St. Jean Baptiste
- Local urban district
- Location of St. Jean Baptiste in Manitoba.
- Country: Canada
- Province: Manitoba
- Region: Pembina Valley
- Rural Municipality: Montcalm

Government
  - MP (Provencher): Ted Falk (CPC)

Area
  - Total: 2.02 km^{2} (0.78 sq mi)

Population (2021)
  - Total: 576
  - Density: 285.2/km^{2} (739/sq mi)
- Time zone: UTC-6 (CST)
  - Summer (DST): UTC-5 (CDT)

St. Jean Baptiste is an unincorporated community recognized as a local urban district in Manitoba. It is located in the Rural Municipality of Montcalm along Highway 75, 40 km north of Emerson at the United States border, and 60 km south of Winnipeg.

The community has a distinct French-Canadian culture. The area was first settled by Métis families from St. Norbert, Manitoba; in 1878, French-Canadian families from the United States arrived in the area and purchased land. The post office opened in 1877 and a parish and Canadian National Railway point were also part of the early development.

The community was originally called Grosse Pointe, then was renamed Mission de la Rivière aux Prunes, before receiving its present name from Archbishop Taché in 1872. It has since been known as St. Jean Baptiste (or simply, St. Jean).

The community is known for its annual all-terrain vehicle derby, one of the largest in Canada.

== Demographics ==
In the 2021 Census of Population conducted by Statistics Canada, St. Jean Baptiste had a population of 576 living in 246 of its 258 total private dwellings, a change of 2.3% from its 2016 population of 563. With a land area of 2.02 km^{2} (0.78 sq mi), it had a population density of 285.1/km^{2} (738.5/sq mi) in 2021.
