= Cardinal, Manitoba =

Cardinal
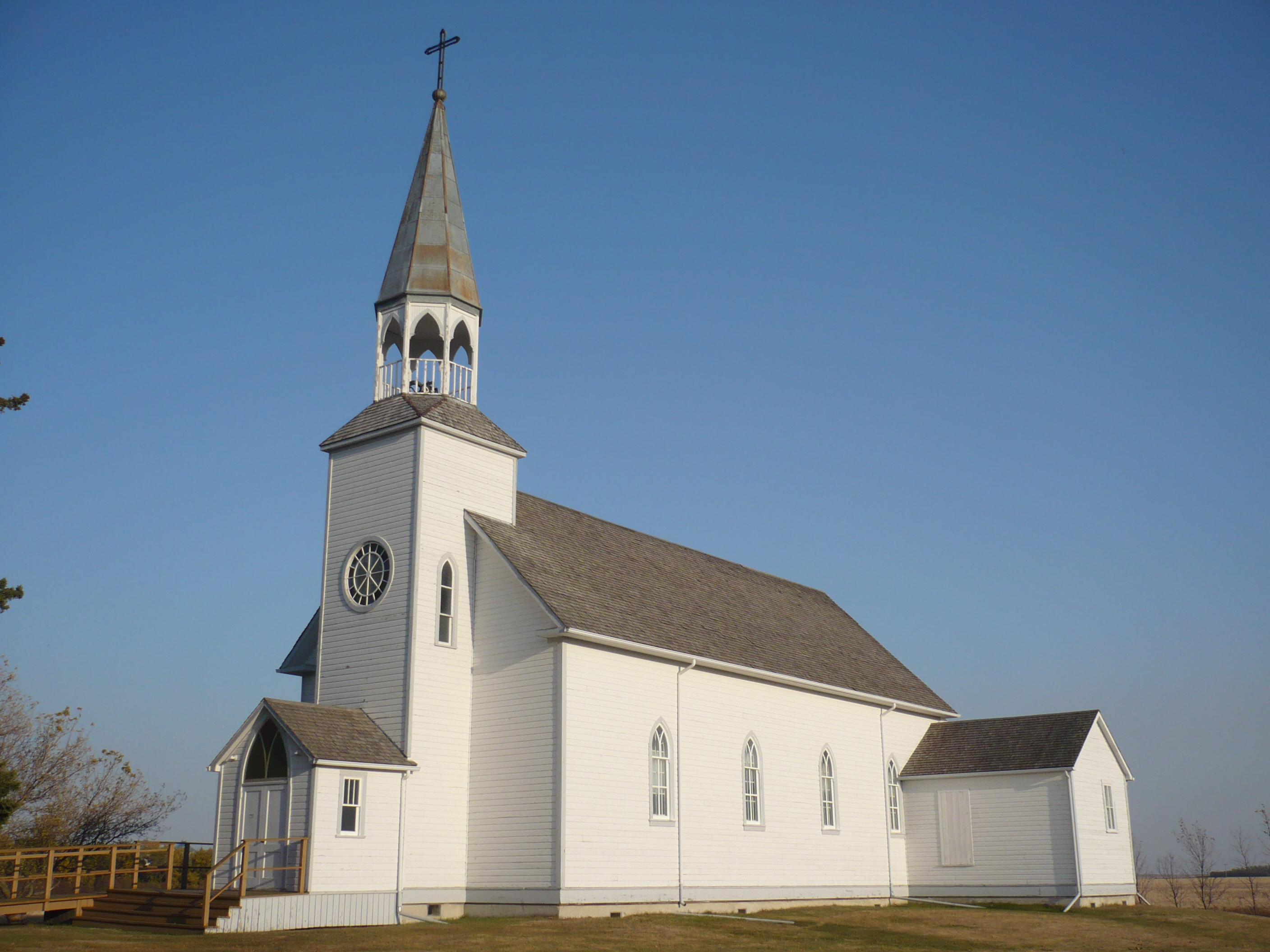
- Ste. Thérèse Chapel at Cardinal

- Location of Cardinal in Manitoba
- Coordinates: 49°29′41″N 98°33′18″W
- Country: Canada
- Province: Manitoba
- Region: Pembina Valley
- Census Division: No. 4

Government
  - Governing Body: Municipality of Lorne Council
  - MP: Branden Leslie
  - MLA: Lauren Stone
- Time zone: UTC−6 (CST)
  - Summer (DST): UTC−5 (CDT)
- Area codes: 204, 431
- NTS Map: 062G07
- GNBC Code: GAEJG

Cardinal is an unincorporated community located in the Municipality of Lorne in south central Manitoba, Canada. It is located approximately 110 kilometers (68 miles) southwest of Winnipeg, on the west side of Provincial Road 244.

== See also ==
- Immigration to Canada
- List of regions of Manitoba
- List of rural municipalities in Manitoba
