= Louise (2003 film) =

- Directed by: Anita Lebeau
- Written by: Anita Lebeau
- Produced by: Michael Scott; Jennifer Torrance
- Narrated by: Louise Marginet
- Music by: Robert Marginet
- Production company: National Film Board of Canada
- Distributed by: National Film Board of Canada
- Release date: 2003
- Running time: 9 min 57 s
- Country: Canada
- Language: English

Louise is a 2003 animated short by Anita Lebeau, produced by the National Film Board of Canada. The film takes audiences through a day in the life of Lebeau's 96-year-old Belgian-Canadian grandmother, Louise Marginet, who narrates the film. Set in the rural community of Bruxelles, Manitoba, Louise features traditional music played by family as well as the Bruxelles Brass Band.

Louise received 6 awards including the Hiroshima Prize at the Hiroshima International Animation Festival and the Canal J Jury Junior Award for Short Films at the Annecy International Animated Film Festival. The film was also nominated for best animated short at the 25th Genie Awards.

Louise was animated on paper by Lebeau, Jason Doll and John Tanasiciuk, with computer rendering. Lebeau had begun working on the film in 1998, before taking a break to raise her two children. When interviewed at Hiroshima, the filmmaker stated that her grandmother, who had died before the film was completed, was thrilled to have a movie made about her life and family.
