= Graysville, Manitoba =

Graysville
- Location of Graysville in Manitoba
- Coordinates: 49°30′33″N 98°9′27″W
- Country: Canada
- Province: Manitoba
- Region: Pembina Valley
- Census Division: No. 3

Government
  - Governing Body: Rural Municipality of Dufferin Council
  - MP: Branden Leslie
  - MLA: Lauren Stone
- Time zone: UTC−6 (CST)
  - Summer (DST): UTC−5 (CDT)
- Postal Code: R0G 0T0
- Area codes: 204, 431
- NTS Map: 062G09
- GNBC Code: GAJUV

Graysville is an unincorporated community in south central Manitoba, Canada. It is located approximately 11 kilometers (7 miles) west of Carman, Manitoba in the Rural Municipality of Dufferin.

The Post Office was opened in 1904 on the farm of George Gray where a town site had developed. There was a Gray, Saskatchewan so the name Graysville became the mail name. The community had been known as Grays. The railway point and the school district also assumed the name.
