= Minto, Manitoba =

Human settlement in Manitoba, Canada

Coordinates: 49°24′27″N 100°01′16″W

Minto
- Local urban district
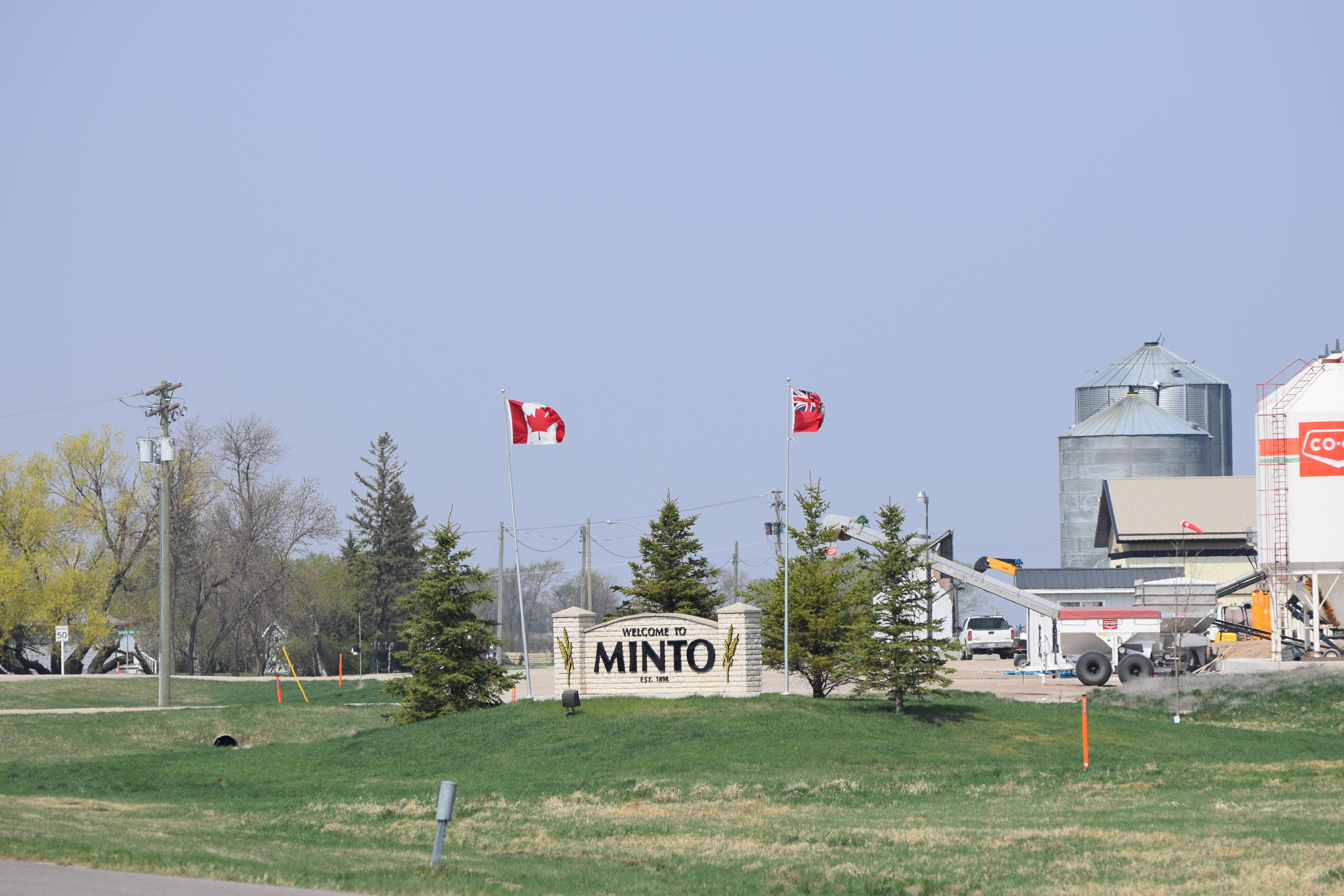
- Welcome sign for Minto, Manitoba

- Location within Manitoba
- Named after: Sir Gilbert Elliot-Murray-Kynynmound, 4th Earl of Minto
- Time zone: UTC-6 (CST)
  - Summer (DST): UTC-5 (CDT)
- Area code: 204

Minto is an unincorporated community recognized as a local urban district located in the Municipality of Grassland, Manitoba, Canada.

A railway point for the Canadian National railway and post office was located in Minto. It was named in 1899 for Sir Gilbert Elliot-Murray-Kynynmound, 4th Earl of Minto. He was the Governor General of Canada at the time.

== Transportation ==
Minto is located 48 kilometres (30 mi) south of Brandon at the southern end of the concurrence of Manitoba Highways 10 and 23. These routes connect it to several other communities in the region, as well as the North Dakota border at the International Peace Garden and the Pembina Valley region of the province.

== Popular culture ==
Minto was featured during season 4 of the CBC program Still Standing.

The episode originally aired on December 4, 2018.
