= Mariapolis, Manitoba =

Mariapolis
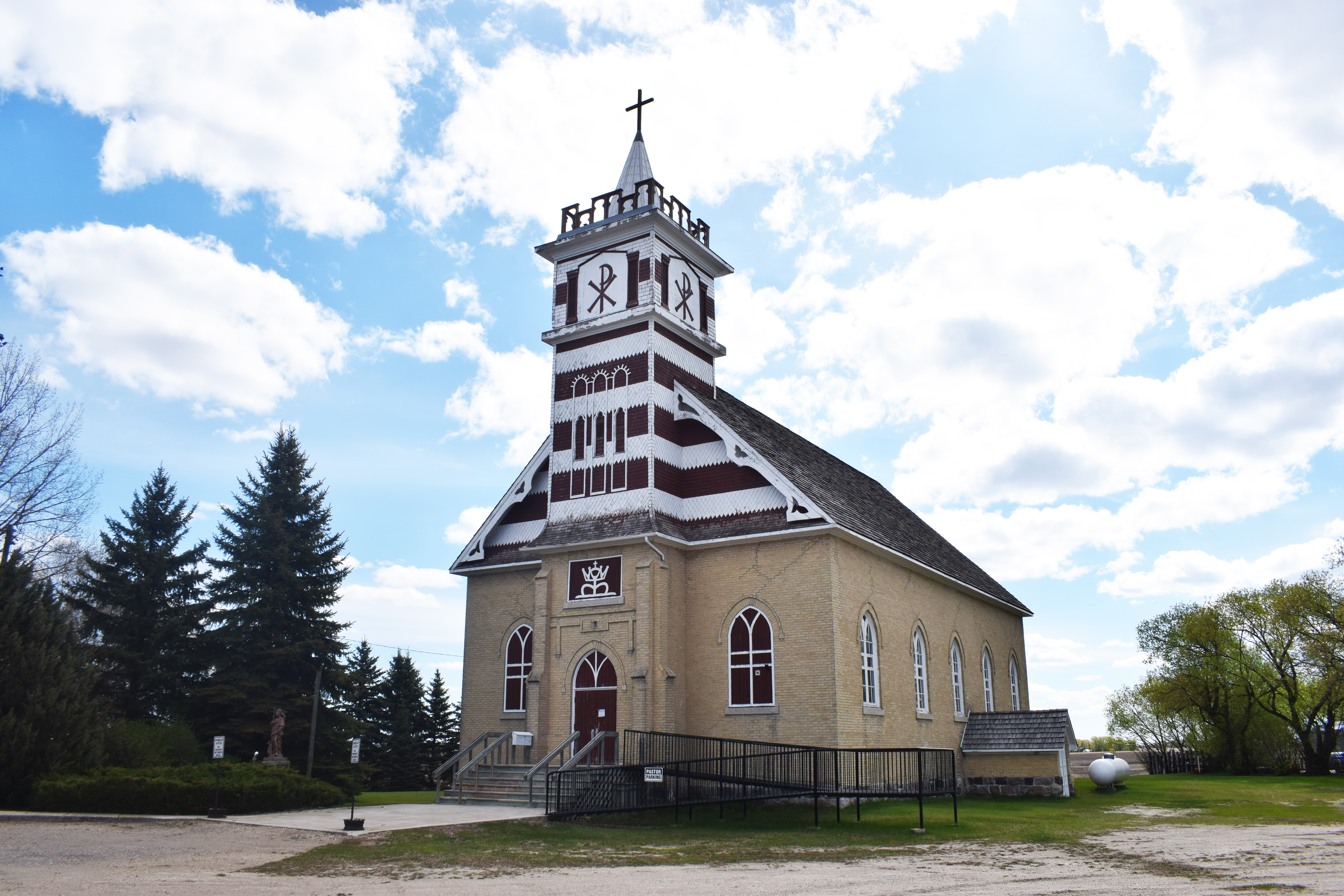
- Our Lady of Assumption Roman Catholic Church in Mariapolis.

- Location of Mariapolis in Manitoba
- Coordinates: 49°21′45″N 98°59′20″W
- Country: Canada
- Province: Manitoba
- Region: Pembina Valley
- Census Division: No. 4

Government
  - Governing Body: Municipality of Lorne Council
  - MP: Branden Leslie
  - MLA: Lauren Stone
- Time zone: UTC−6 (CST)
  - Summer (DST): UTC−5 (CDT)
- Postal Code: R0K 1K0
- Area codes: 204, 431
- NTS Map: 062G07
- GNBC Code: GAQEJ

Mariapolis AKA the Gateway to Nature, is an unincorporated community recognized as a local urban district located within the Municipality of Lorne in south central Manitoba, Canada. It is located approximately 67 kilometers (42 miles) northwest of Morden.

== See also ==
- List of regions of Manitoba
- List of rural municipalities in Manitoba
