= St. Lupicin, Manitoba =

St. Lupicin
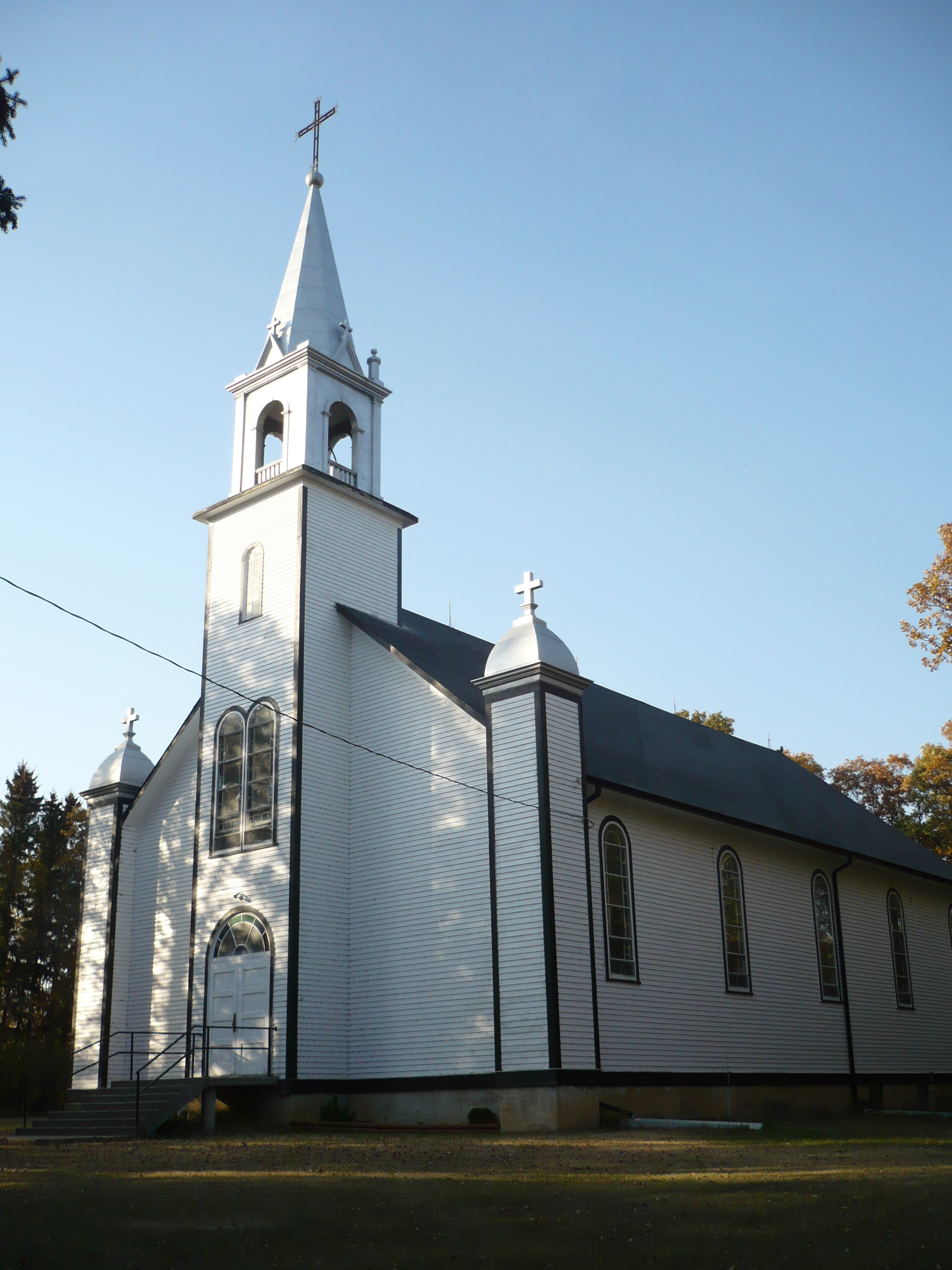
- St. Lupicin Roman Catholic Church

- Location of St. Lupicin in Manitoba
- Coordinates: 49°27′31″N 98°28′35″W
- Country: Canada
- Province: Manitoba
- Region: Pembina Valley
- Census Division: No. 4

Government
  - Governing Body: Municipality of Lorne Council
  - MP: Branden Leslie
  - MLA: Lauren Stone
- Time zone: UTC−6 (CST)
  - Summer (DST): UTC−5 (CDT)
- Area codes: 204, 431
- NTS Map: 062G08
- GNBC Code: GAXYQ

St. Lupicin is a locality within the Municipality of Lorne in south central Manitoba, Canada. It is located approximately 35 kilometres (22 miles) southwest of Carman, Manitoba.

== See also ==
- List of regions of Manitoba
- List of rural municipalities in Manitoba
