= Baldur, Manitoba =

Baldur
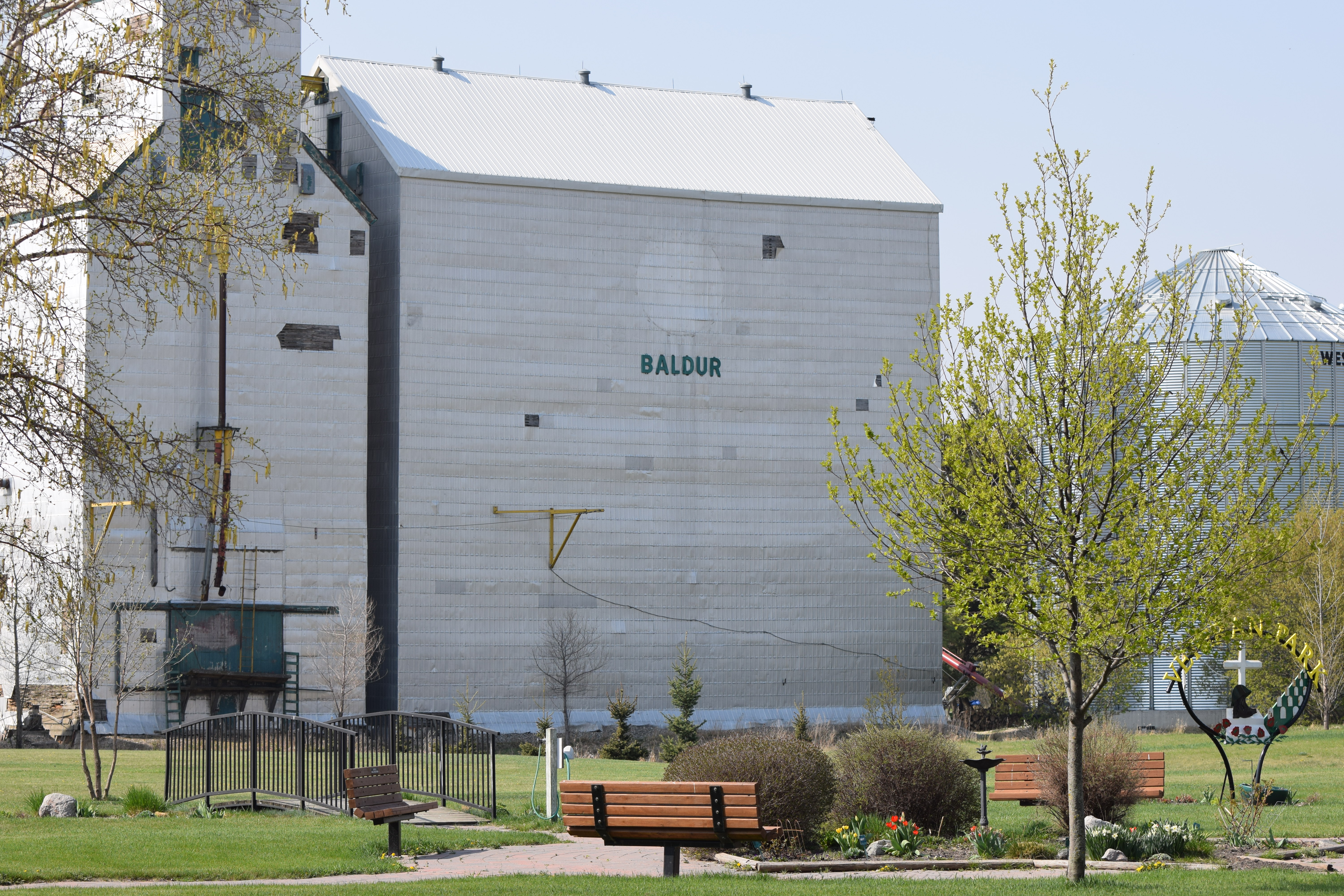
- The grain elevator and Veteran Park in Baldur.

- Location within Manitoba
- Coordinates: 49°23′08″N 99°14′37″W
- Country: Canada
- Province: Manitoba

Area
  - Total: 2.21 km^{2} (0.85 sq mi)

Population (2016)
  - Total: 320
  - Density: 144.9/km^{2} (375/sq mi)
- Time zone: UTC−5 (CST)
  - Summer (DST): UTC−6 (CDT)

Baldur is an unincorporated community recognized as a local urban district in the Rural Municipality of Argyle, Manitoba.

Baldur is the largest community of the Argyle municipality, which is in southwestern Manitoba between Brandon and Portage la Prairie. The community is named after the Norse god Baldur, reflecting the Icelandic heritage of the people in the community.

== History ==
The community was founded in 1890 with the coming of the Northern Pacific and Manitoba Railway, which began building its line through the Municipality of Argyle in 1889. The 1890 NPMR Station was moved to Manitoba Agricultural Museum in 1975.

A railway officially originally suggested to name the post office "Chesterville" after local citizen Jesse Chester, who is said to have persuaded the surveyor into choosing the site. Another local, however, suggested to name the community after Baldr, son of Odin and Nordic god representing innocence and light. It was put to a vote, with Baldur eventually being adopted as the town name.

== Demographics ==
In the 2021 Census of Population conducted by Statistics Canada, Baldur had a population of 297 living in 146 of its 155 total private dwellings, a change of −7.2% from its 2016 population of 320. With a land area of 2.14 km^{2} (0.83 sq mi), it had a population density of 138.8/km^{2} (359.5/sq mi) in 2021.

== Notable people ==
- Tom Johnson — Hockey Hall of Famer, born in Baldur
- Bill Stilwell — award-winning author and naturalist, born in Baldur
- Hallgrímur Fr. Hallgrímsson (1905–84) — Icelandic businessman, who went to high school in Baldur.

== Climate ==
Climate data for Baldur
Month	Jan	Feb	Mar	Apr	May	Jun	Jul	Aug	Sep	Oct	Nov	Dec	Year
Record high °C (°F)	8.9 (48.0)	13.5 (56.3)	21.7 (71.1)	36 (97)	37 (99)	37.2 (99.0)	37.8 (100.0)	39.5 (103.1)	38.3 (100.9)	34 (93)	24.5 (76.1)	15.6 (60.1)	39.5 (103.1)
Mean daily maximum °C (°F)	−10.7 (12.7)	−6.9 (19.6)	−0.4 (31.3)	10.4 (50.7)	19 (66)	23.1 (73.6)	25.6 (78.1)	25.4 (77.7)	18.8 (65.8)	11.4 (52.5)	0 (32)	−8.2 (17.2)	9 (48)
Daily mean °C (°F)	−16.4 (2.5)	−12.7 (9.1)	−5.9 (21.4)	3.6 (38.5)	11.6 (52.9)	16.4 (61.5)	18.8 (65.8)	18 (64)	11.9 (53.4)	4.9 (40.8)	−4.9 (23.2)	−13.5 (7.7)	2.6 (36.7)
Mean daily minimum °C (°F)	−22.1 (−7.8)	−18.5 (−1.3)	−11.4 (11.5)	−3.1 (26.4)	4.2 (39.6)	9.6 (49.3)	12 (54)	10.5 (50.9)	4.9 (40.8)	−1.5 (29.3)	−9.8 (14.4)	−18.8 (−1.8)	−3.7 (25.3)
Record low °C (°F)	−41.1 (−42.0)	−42.5 (−44.5)	−36 (−33)	−29.4 (−20.9)	−10.6 (12.9)	−2.8 (27.0)	1.1 (34.0)	−4 (25)	−7.8 (18.0)	−22.5 (−8.5)	−35.5 (−31.9)	−39 (−38)	−42.5 (−44.5)
Average precipitation mm (inches)	22.9 (0.90)	23.4 (0.92)	26.4 (1.04)	32.2 (1.27)	62.6 (2.46)	91.7 (3.61)	69.2 (2.72)	73.8 (2.91)	49.8 (1.96)	39.3 (1.55)	26.8 (1.06)	25.4 (1.00)	542.5 (21.36)
Source: Environment Canada

== See also ==
- List of communities in Manitoba
- List of regions of Manitoba
