= Bill Stilwell =

Canadian nature writer

Bill Stilwell is a Canadian nature writer. He is the author of three national best-sellers: Manitoba Wild, Manitoba Naturally, and Scenic Secrets of Manitoba. Stilwell is the only rural Manitoba author who has had two or more national best-sellers while continuing to live here.

== Awards ==
These books have received the following awards:

- Manitoba Wild - Outdoor Writers of Canada Book Award
- Manitoba Wild - Tourism "Product Development Award"
- Manitoba Naturally - "Canadian Outdoor Book of the Year"
