= Lowe Farm =

Unincorporated community

Coordinates: 49°21′17″N 97°35′20″W

Lowe Farm is a farming community in southern Manitoba, Canada in the Rural Municipality of Morris, 10 minutes west of Morris, Manitoba, on Manitoba Highway 23. It was founded in the 1880s, when John Lowe (born February 20, 1824) managed a campaign to attract immigrants, particularly farmers and farm labourers for Manitoba. Lowe Farm became a model farm and a testing ground for farming innovations and later developed into a village.

Lowe Farm has three churches, a credit union, a recreation centre, a privately owned grocery store, farm supply, gas station, a café, an elementary/junior high school and a community park. Lowe Farm has three baseball diamonds: two in the park and one on the school playground where a baseball program is run. There was once a grain elevator but it was demolished in September 2021. The town is laid out in a reverse L-shape.

Lowe Farm School has 70 students, and 10 staff members. The school has a Natural Playground that consists of a toboggan hill and swings. The school has been integrating technology by using smartboards, netbooks, desktops, and LCD projectors into their everyday experiences. The students are very engaged, participating in leadership activities like buddy reading, computer buddies, gym helpers, canteen helpers, and book order volunteers. They also participate in inter-school sports like basketball, volleyball, cross-country, badminton, floor hockey, and softball. The student council organizes events like Fall Frolics, Spirit Week, School Newspaper, Talent Show, and Oreo dunking, and organize sales of school clothing.
