= Saint Alphonse, Manitoba =

Saint Alphonse
- Village
- Location of Saint Alphonse in Manitoba
- Country: Canada
- Province: Manitoba
- Rural Municipality: Lorne
- Time zone: UTC-4
  - Summer (DST): UTC-3

Saint Alphonse is a small English speaking Belgian community in the province of Manitoba, Canada. Saint Alphonse is part of the Municipality of Lorne.

The village of Saint Alphonse was founded in the early 1880s by immigrants mainly from Belgium and some from Quebec. Other Belgian immigrants settled further north and founded the village of Bruxelles.

The school of Saint Alphonse opened in 1883. It hosted Belgian children of whom two-thirds were Walloons and from Brussels and a third of Flemish origin. The common language of instruction for all students was only French. In 1959, the school of Saint Alphonse regrouped neighbouring French-speaking schools (École La Grange, école Saint-Urbain, école Saint-Albert). Due to the depopulation of villages, St. Alphonsus school closed in 1996. The children were redirected to Anglophone schools in the nearby towns of Swan Lake and Bruxelles, Manitoba.

== See also ==
- Immigration to Canada
- List of regions of Manitoba
- List of rural municipalities in Manitoba
