= Altamont, Manitoba =

Community in Manitoba, Canada

Altamont
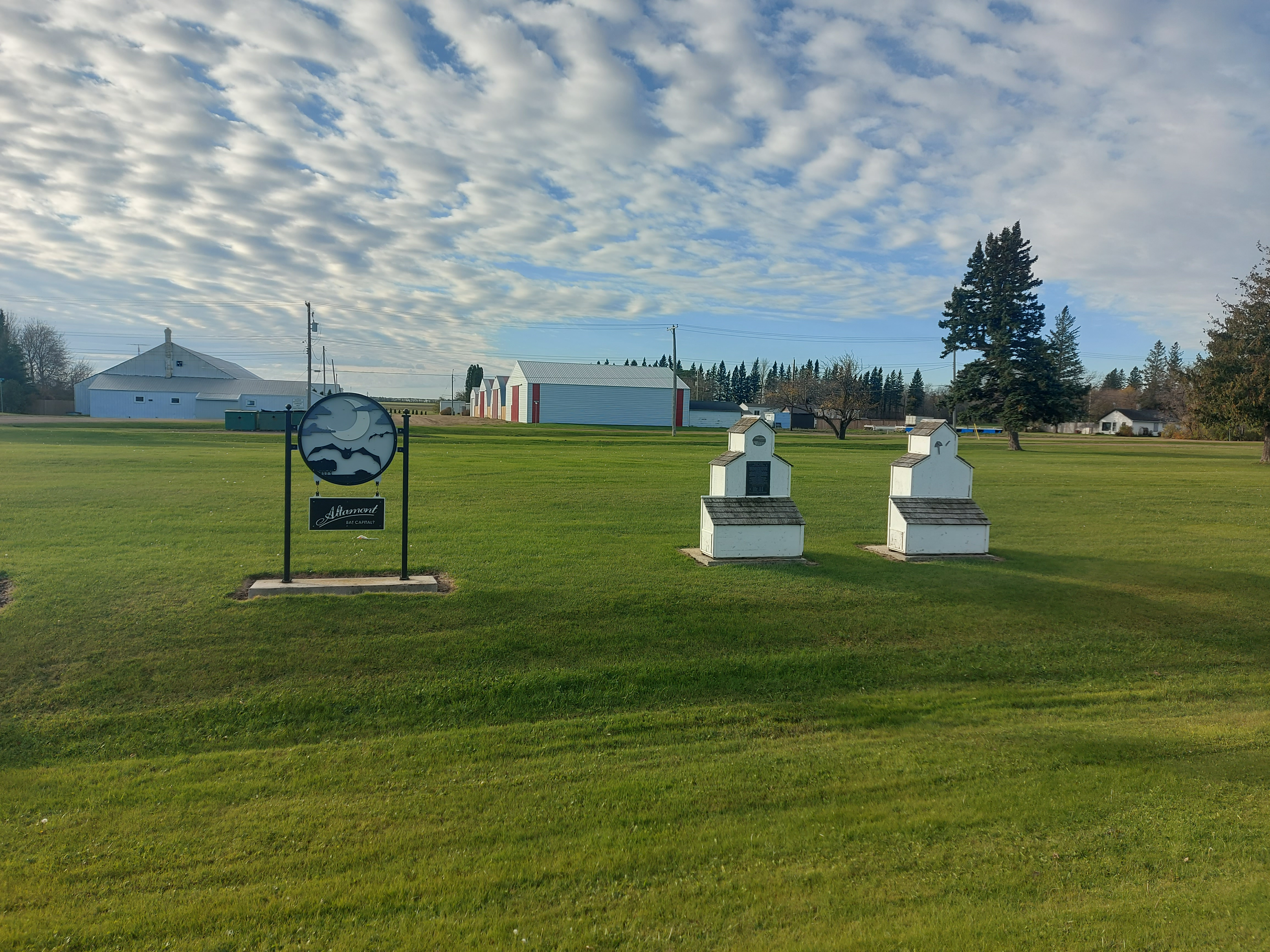
- Welcome sign and mini grain elevators

- Location of Altamont in Manitoba Altamont (Canada)
- Coordinates: 49°23′55″N 98°29′50″W
- Country: Canada
- Province: Manitoba
- Region: Pembina Valley
- Census Division: No. 4

Government
  - MP: Branden Leslie
  - MLA: Lauren Stone
- Time zone: UTC−6 (CST)
  - Summer (DST): UTC−5 (CDT)
- Postal Code: R0G 0A0
- Area code: 204
- NTS Map: 062G08
- GNBC Code: GAAPS

Altamont is an unincorporated community recognized as a local urban district located within the Municipality of Lorne in south central Manitoba, Canada.

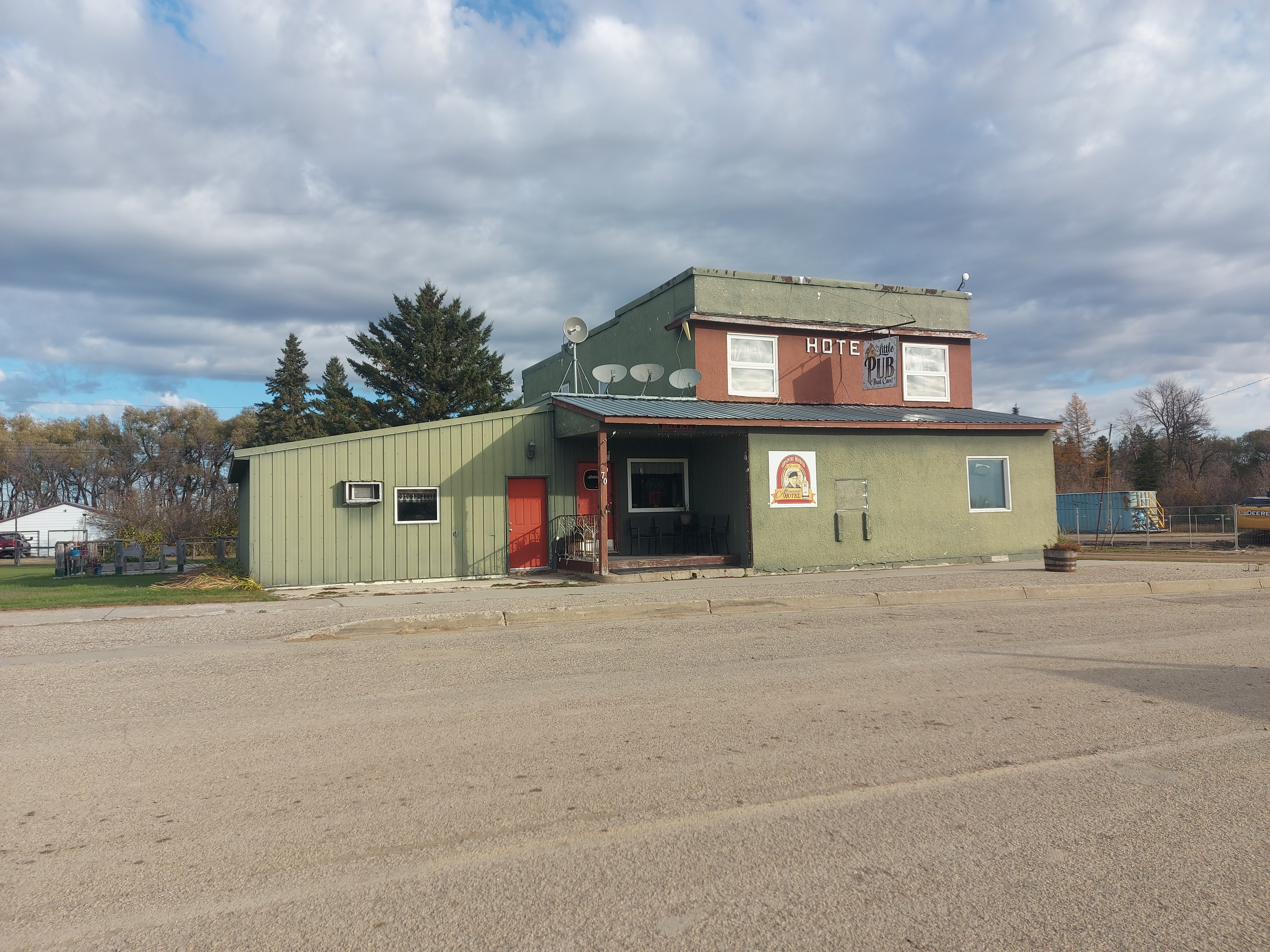
Pub and hotel in Altamont

== See also ==
- List of regions of Manitoba
- List of rural municipalities in Manitoba
