= Darlingford =

Darlingford, Manitoba
- Local urban district
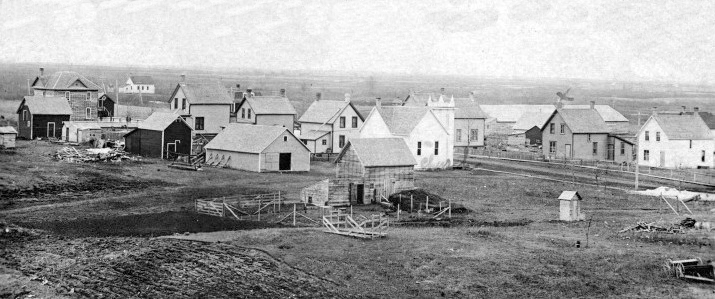
- Darlingford, 1907

- Location within Manitoba Location within Canada
- Coordinates: 49°12′14″N 98°22′41″W
- Country: Canada
- Province: Manitoba
- Region: Pembina Valley
- Time zone: UTC-6 (CST)
  - Summer (DST): UTC-5 (CDT)
- Postal code: R0G 0L0
- GNBC Code: GAGCY

Darlingford is an unincorporated community recognized as a local urban district located 21 km (13 mi) west of Morden, Manitoba in the Municipality of Pembina in the Pembina Valley region of southern Manitoba, Canada.

== History ==
Darlingford was founded by James Ephraim Law, builder of the first house in the town. The Law cairn was erected and is a tribute to the steadfast love of family and community that was inherent in the life of John Oliver and Sara Law. They instilled these same virtues in their thirteen children that they raised on this very site. John Oliver is the son of James Ephriam Law. James was said to have purchased this NW8-3-7W in 1898 but the registration did not take place until 1902.

A Manitoba Historical Plaque was erected in Darlingford by the province to commemorate Darlingford Memorial and Park's role in Manitoba's heritage.

In 1921, Darlingford and the surrounding district commemorated their military efforts and their war dead by constructing a small Gothic-inspired memorial building and park. The Darlingford Memorial Park was largely inspired by Ferris Bolton, a pioneer farmer and politician from Darlingford, whose three sons were killed in France in 1917. Maintained today by local volunteers, it remains the only free-standing memorial building in Manitoba with the sole function of commemorating the war dead. Two black marble tablets inside the structure display the names of 199 local veterans and victims of both the First World War and Second World War. The memorial was designated a Manitoba Provincial Heritage Site on March 29, 1991 by the Government of Manitoba.

As early as 1905, the Manitoba Department of Education was experimenting with consolidation to better serve local communities and students. It was thought that a bigger and better equipped school, in a centralized location, provided better education. Darlingford Consolidated School No. 1228, completed in 1910 on a design by Winnipeg architect F. R. Evans, is an example of those developments. Built of brick, the entrance tower is notably off-centre so that, as the school enrollment grew, another wing would be added on the south side of the building. That never happened at Darlingford. The building features a rare fire escape system off the second floor at the rear.

The building is now home for the Darlingford School Heritage Museum.

== See also ==
- List of regions of Manitoba
- List of rural municipalities in Manitoba
