= Swan Lake, Manitoba =

Swan Lake
- Local urban district
- Location of Swan Lake in Manitoba
- Coordinates: 49.411°N 98.790°W
- Country: Canada
- Province: Manitoba
- Rural municipality: Lorne

Area
  - Land: 0.71 km^{2} (0.27 sq mi)

Population (2021)
  - Total: 276
- Time zone: UTC-6 (CST)
  - Summer (DST): UTC-5 (CDT)

Swan Lake is a local urban district within the Municipality of Lorne in the Canadian province of Manitoba. It is recognized as a designated place by Statistics Canada.

== Demographics ==
As a designated place in the 2021 Census of Population conducted by Statistics Canada, Swan Lake had a population of 276 living in 132 of its 149 total private dwellings, a change of 8.2% from its 2016 population of 255. With a land area of 0.71 km^{2} (0.27 sq mi), it had a population density of 388.7/km^{2} (1,006.8/sq mi) in 2021.

== See also ==
- List of communities in Manitoba
- List of designated places in Manitoba
- List of local urban districts in Manitoba
