= Municipality of Lorne =

Rural municipality in Manitoba, Canada

Lorne
- Rural municipality
- Municipality of Lorne
- Location of the RM of Lorne in Manitoba
- Coordinates: 49°26′37″N 98°44′58″W
- Country: Canada
- Province: Manitoba
- Region: Central Plains and Pembina Valley
- Division: Pilot Mound Census Division
- Incorporated (amalgamated): January 1, 2015
- Time zone: UTC-6 (CST)
  - Summer (DST): UTC-5 (CDT)

The Municipality of Lorne (French: Municipalité de Lorne) is a rural municipality (RM) in the Canadian province of Manitoba.

== History ==
The Municipality of Lorne, formerly known as the Rural Municipality of Lorne, was created on January 1, 2015 via the amalgamation of the RM of Lorne and the villages of Notre-Dame-de-Lourdes and Somerset. It was formed as a requirement of The Municipal Amalgamations Act, which required that municipalities with a population less than 1,000 amalgamate with one or more neighbouring municipalities by 2015. The Government of Manitoba initiated these amalgamations in order for municipalities to meet the 1997 minimum population requirement of 1,000 to incorporate a municipality. The RM of Lorne was originally incorporated as a rural municipality on February 14, 1880.

== Communities ==
Local urban districts

- Notre-Dame-de-Lourdes
- Somerset

Unincorporated

- Altamont
- Bruxelles
- Cardinal
- Mariapolis
- St. Alphonse
- St. Leon
- St. Lupicin
- Swan Lake

== Demographics ==
In the 2021 Census of Population conducted by Statistics Canada, Lorne had a population of 2,904 living in 1,103 of its 1,199 total private dwellings, a change of −4.5% from its 2016 population of 3,041. With a land area of 923.03 km^{2} (356.38 sq mi), it had a population density of 3.1/km^{2} (8.1/sq mi) in 2021.

== See also ==
- List of francophone communities in Manitoba
- Royal eponyms in Canada
