= St. Leon, Manitoba =

Coordinates: 49°21′49″N 98°35′22″W

St. Leon in Manitoba

St. Leon (French: Saint-Léon) is an unincorporated community recognized as a local urban district in Manitoba, Canada. It is located in the Municipality of Lorne to the southwest of Winnipeg, near the United States border. The community is best known as the site of the St. Leon Wind Farm project.

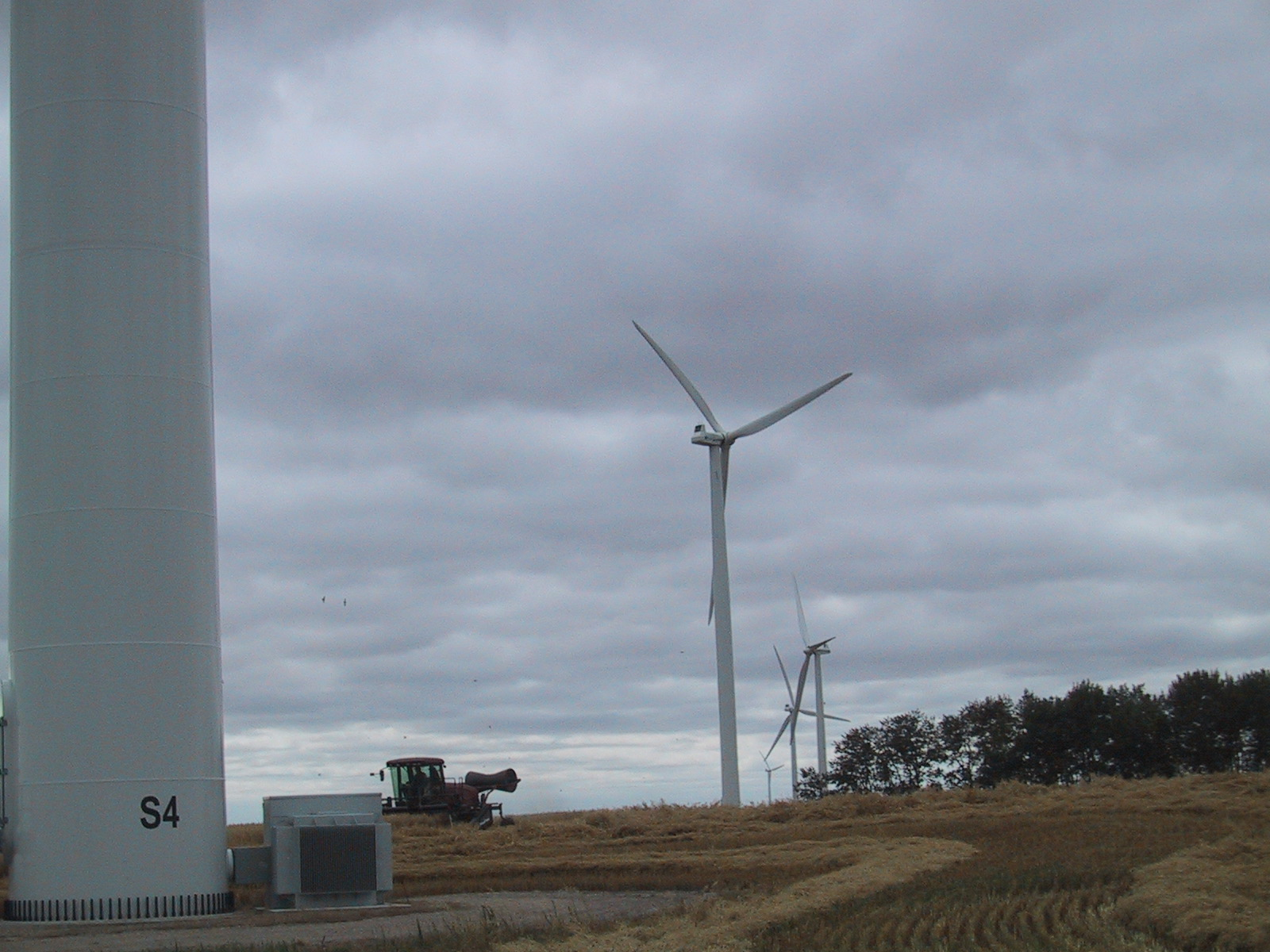
Wind turbines near St. Leon, Manitoba

== See also ==
- List of regions of Manitoba
- List of rural municipalities in Manitoba
