= Miami, Manitoba =

Miami
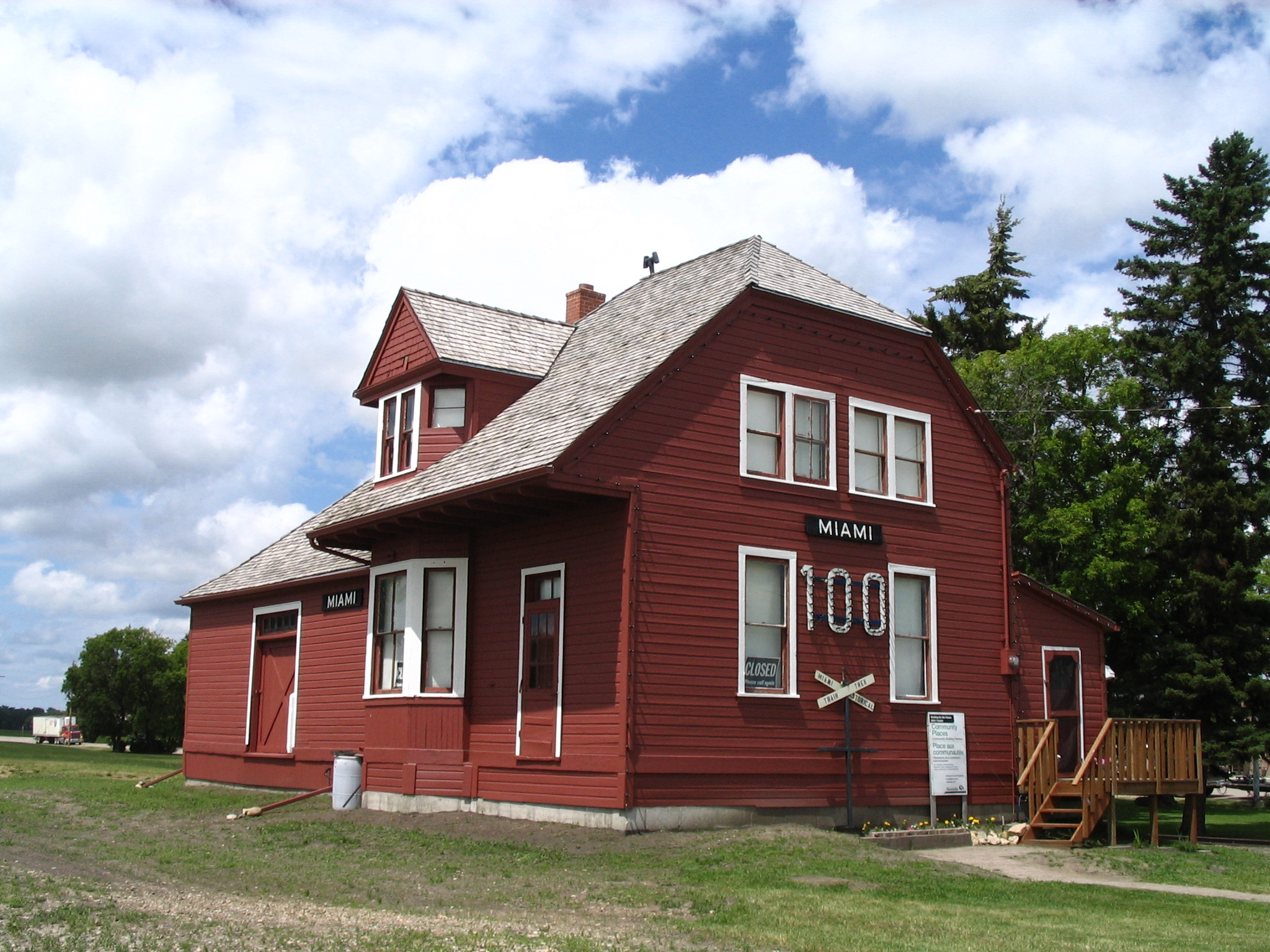
- Miami Railway Station

- Location of Miami in Manitoba
- Coordinates: 49°22′16″N 98°14′38″W
- Country: Canada
- Province: Manitoba
- Region: Pembina Valley
- Census Division: No. 3
- Established: 1885

Government
  - Governing Body: R.M. of Thompson Council
  - MP: Branden Leslie
  - MLA: Lauren Stone

Population (2011 Census)
  - Total: 435
  - Density: 350.6/km^{2} (908/sq mi)
- Time zone: UTC−6 (CST)
  - Summer (DST): UTC−5 (CDT)
- Postal Code: R0G 1H0
- Area code: 204
- NTS Map: 062G08
- GNBC Code: GARDJ

Miami is an unincorporated community recognized as a local urban district in southern Manitoba, Canada, which was formed in 1885. It supports a K-12 school and contains a curling rink and a skating rink. It lies 100 kilometres southwest of Winnipeg in the Rural Municipality of Thompson.

== History ==
In 2005, the community was the victim of a mass street sign theft. All of the community's signs, a total of 44, were stolen just before Christmas Day; the total replacement cost was about $7,000 CAD. That same night a house fire was reported and no street signs were available for directions. Most of the streets in the community are named after prominent past residents or pioneers.

Miami was used in a controversial prank contest by Winnipeg radio station Classic Rock 97.5 FM (CJKR) morning man Scruff Connors in 1995. The radio station ran a contest for an all-expenses-paid trip to Miami to watch the Super Bowl, but did not mention that they were referring to Miami, Manitoba, and not the one in Florida. Local media reported that some participants had considered lawsuits over the prank. Because of the negative backlash of the prank, CJKR terminated Connors' contract within days of the incident.

== Demographics ==
In the 2021 Census of Population conducted by Statistics Canada, Miami had a population of 464 living in 199 of its 216 total private dwellings, a change of 6.9% from its 2016 population of 434. With a land area of 1.2 km^{2} (0.46 sq mi), it had a population density of 386.7/km^{2} (1,001.5/sq mi) in 2021.

== Services ==
Miami, Manitoba has a fire department. Members of the department are trained to a minimum Level I fire fighting certification with the Office of the Fire Commissioner. The Miami Volunteer Fire and Rescue Service has about 24 active members. The community also has an EMS Unit that works in conjunction with the surrounding hospitals.
