= Division No. 4, Manitoba =

Census division in Canada

Coordinates: 49°16′N 98°53′W

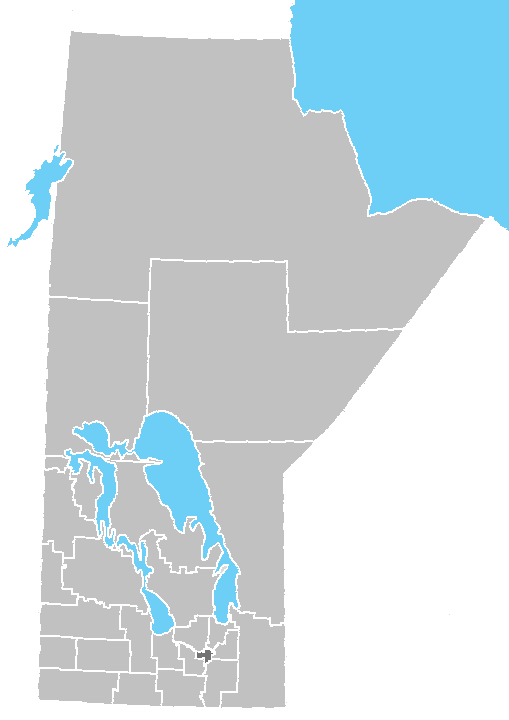

Division No. 4 (Pilot Mound) is a census division located within the Pembina Valley Region in the south-central region of the province of Manitoba, Canada. Unlike in some other provinces, census divisions do not reflect the organization of local government in Manitoba. These areas exist solely for the purposes of statistical analysis and presentation; they have no government of their own.

The major industry of the Pilot Mound is mixed farming and livestock. Also included in the division is the main reserve of the Swan Lake First Nation.

== Demographics ==
In the 2021 Census of Population conducted by Statistics Canada, Division No. 4 had a population of 9,665 living in 3,580 of its 4,089 total private dwellings, a change of −3.2% from its 2016 population of 9,986. With a land area of 4,489.22 km^{2} (1,733.30 sq mi), it had a population density of 2.2/km^{2} (5.6/sq mi) in 2021.

== Municipalities ==
- Argyle
- Cartwright – Roblin
- Lorne (part in Division No. 8)
- Louise
- Pembina

== Unincorporated communities ==
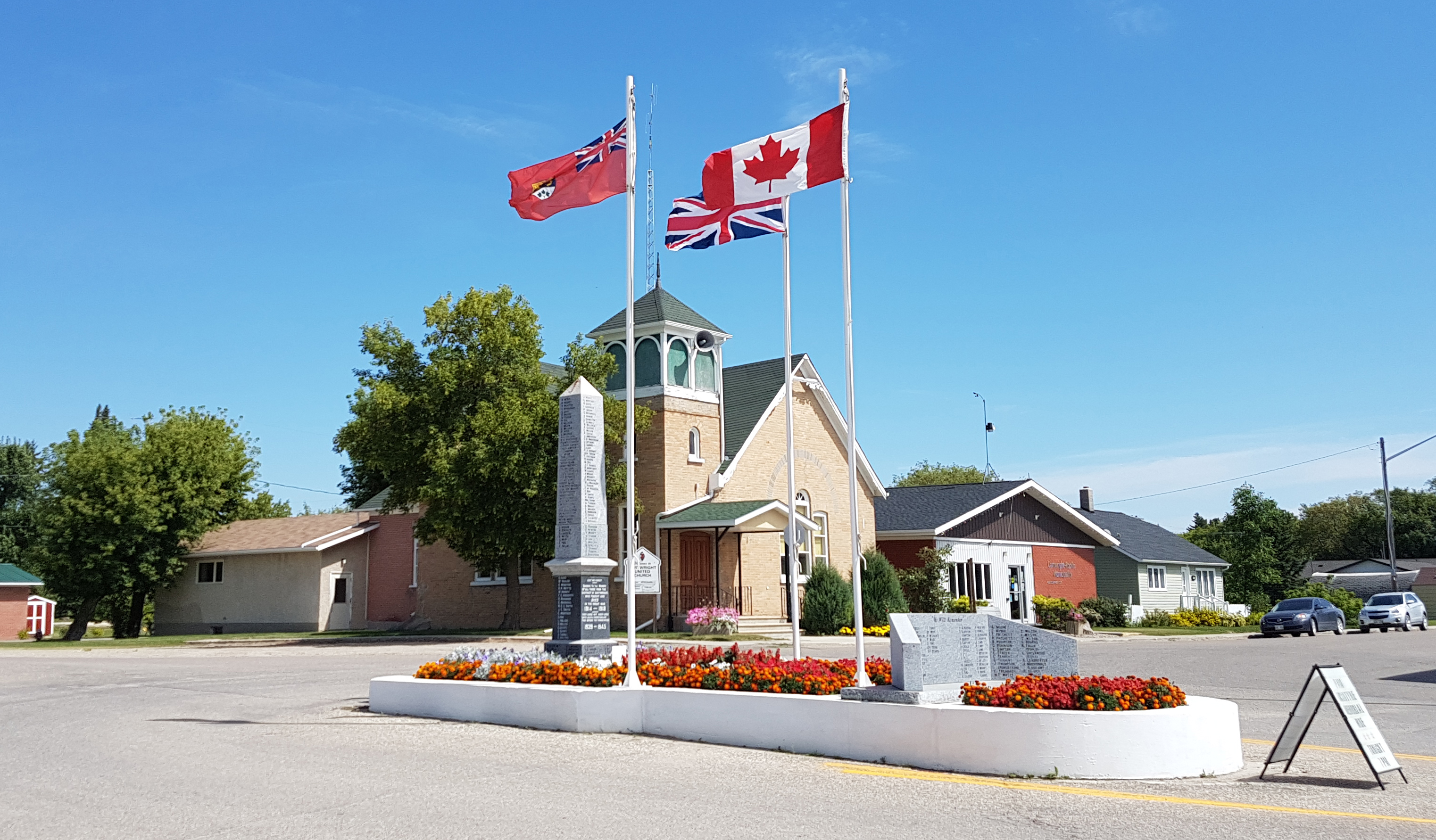
War cenotaph in Cartwright

- Cartwright
- Crystal City
- Manitou
- Pilot Mound
- Somerset

== First Nations reserves ==
- Swan Lake 7
