= Manitou, Manitoba =

Community in Manitoba, Canada

Manitou
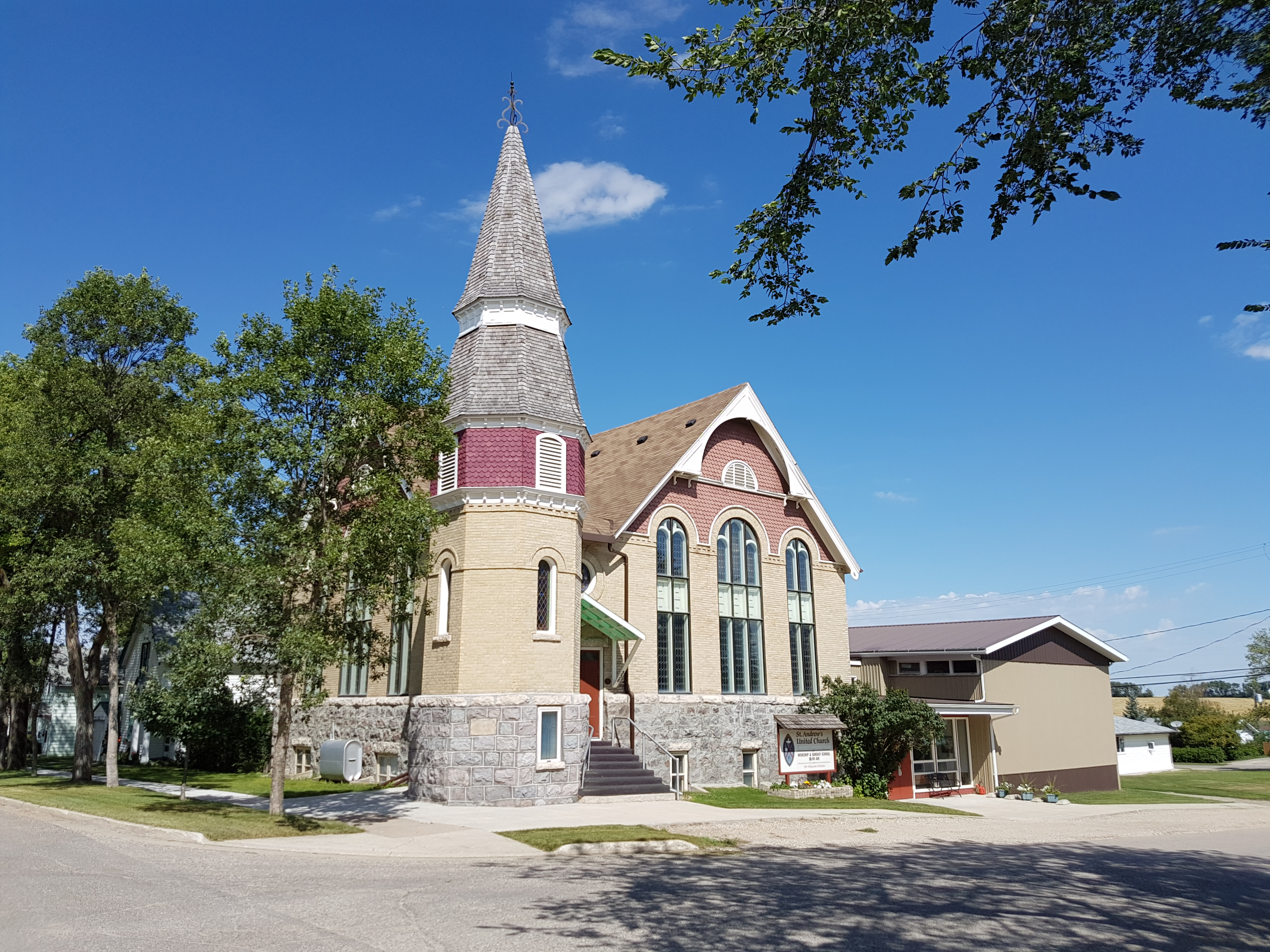
- St. Andrew's United Church in Manitou, constructed in 1901.

- Location of Manitou in Manitoba Manitou (Canada)
- Coordinates: 49°14′26″N 98°32′12″W
- Country: Canada
- Province: Manitoba
- Region: Pembina Valley
- Census Division: No. 4

Government
  - MP: Grant Jackson (politician)
  - MLA: Doyle Piwniuk

Area
  - Land: 3.36 km^{2} (1.30 sq mi)

Population (2021 Census)
  - Total: 812
  - Density: 249.9/km^{2} (647/sq mi)
- Time zone: UTC−06:00 (CST)
  - Summer (DST): UTC−05:00 (CDT)
- Postal Code: R0G 1G0
- Area code: 204
- NTS Map: 062G02
- GNBC Code: GBSLG

Manitou is an unincorporated urban community in the Municipality of Pembina within the Canadian province of Manitoba that held town status prior to January 1, 2015. The Boundary Trail Railway is based in Manitou. The community's motto is "More Than A Small Town". The community is adjacent to PTH 3 and PR 244. Manitou is located near Mennonite communities such as Winkler, Manitoba and is right next to the St. Leon Wind Farm, the largest wind farm in Manitoba and one of the largest in Canada.

== Demographics ==
In the 2021 Census of Population conducted by Statistics Canada, Manitou had a population of 812 living in 363 of its 379 total private dwellings, a change of −3.3% from its 2016 population of 840. With a land area of 3.38 km^{2} (1.31 sq mi), it had a population density of 240.2/km^{2} (622.2/sq mi) in 2021.

== Media ==
Manitou had a weekly newspaper, the Western Canadian which was founded in March 1900 and ran until April 2023 when it was merged with the Pilot Mound Sentinel Courier to form the Hometown View.

== Arts and culture ==
Built in 1930, in the Arts and Crafts movement style, the Manitou Opera House is a local heritage landmark known for its unique acoustics. In 2007, Winnipeg folk musician Christine Fellows recorded parts of her album Nevertheless in the Manitou Opera House. It is booked for over 200 events per year.

Two historic houses associated with writer and activist Nellie McClung were renovated and relocated to the town in 2017 and reopened as museums.

== Transportation ==
- Highway 3
- Provincial Road 244
- Manitou Airport

== Notable people ==
- Thelma Forbes, politician
- Robert Ironside, businessman
- Nellie McClung, writer
