= Rathwell, Manitoba =

Coordinates: 49°38′49″N 98°32′47″W

Location of Rathwell in Manitoba

Rathwell is an unincorporated urban centre in the province of Manitoba. It is part of the agricultural area of south central Manitoba, Canada and is situated in the Municipality of Norfolk Treherne.

== Climate ==
Climate data for Rathwell
Month	Jan	Feb	Mar	Apr	May	Jun	Jul	Aug	Sep	Oct	Nov	Dec	Year
Record high °C (°F)	7.5 (45.5)	10 (50)	18.5 (65.3)	35 (95)	38.5 (101.3)	37.5 (99.5)	36.1 (97.0)	40 (104)	38.5 (101.3)	32 (90)	23.9 (75.0)	14.4 (57.9)	40 (104)
Mean daily maximum °C (°F)	−12 (10)	−7.5 (18.5)	−0.7 (30.7)	10.3 (50.5)	19.3 (66.7)	23.4 (74.1)	25.6 (78.1)	25.3 (77.5)	18.9 (66.0)	11.2 (52.2)	−0.7 (30.7)	−9 (16)	8.7 (47.7)
Daily mean °C (°F)	−16.9 (1.6)	−12.5 (9.5)	−5.6 (21.9)	4.2 (39.6)	12.2 (54.0)	17 (63)	19.2 (66.6)	18.3 (64.9)	12.6 (54.7)	5.6 (42.1)	−5 (23)	−13.5 (7.7)	3 (37)
Mean daily minimum °C (°F)	−21.8 (−7.2)	−17.5 (0.5)	−10.5 (13.1)	−1.9 (28.6)	5.1 (41.2)	10.5 (50.9)	12.7 (54.9)	11.3 (52.3)	6.2 (43.2)	0 (32)	−9.2 (15.4)	−18 (0)	−2.8 (27.0)
Record low °C (°F)	−38.3 (−36.9)	−42 (−44)	−45.6 (−50.1)	−27.8 (−18.0)	−12.5 (9.5)	−1.5 (29.3)	1.5 (34.7)	−2.5 (27.5)	−6.7 (19.9)	−19.5 (−3.1)	−35.5 (−31.9)	−38.5 (−37.3)	−42 (−44)
Average precipitation mm (inches)	23.2 (0.91)	20.2 (0.80)	25.3 (1.00)	32.9 (1.30)	59.6 (2.35)	78.7 (3.10)	78.2 (3.08)	60.5 (2.38)	51.8 (2.04)	39.3 (1.55)	28 (1.1)	26.8 (1.06)	524.3 (20.64)
Source: Environment Canada
