= Bruxelles, Manitoba =

Bruxelles
- Unincorporated Community
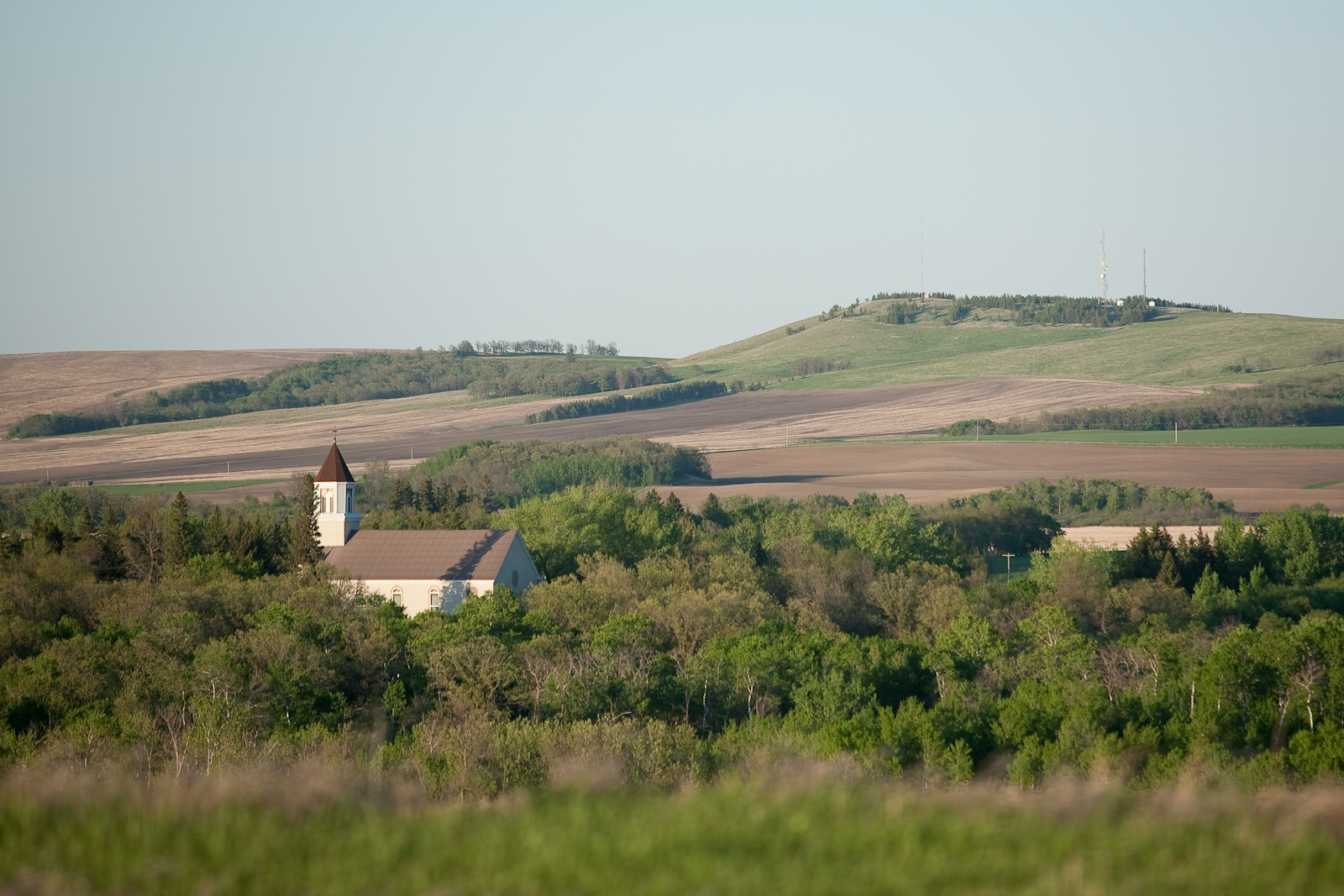
- Bruxelles, looking Northeast, in 2012

- Bruxelles in Manitoba
- Coordinates: 49°29′15″N 98°55′07″W
- Country: Canada
- Province: Manitoba
- Established: 1892

Government
  - MP: Branden Leslie
  - MLA: Doyle Piwniuk
- Time zone: UTC-6 (CST)
- Postal code: R0G 0G0
- Area code: +1-204

Bruxelles is a small community located in the Municipality of Lorne, Manitoba, Canada. It was founded in 1892 by Belgian immigrants.

== History ==
The name was chosen by Archbishop Alexandre-Antonin Taché of Roman Catholic Archdiocese of Saint Boniface partially because of the origin of the local settlers and also because it was the home city of the communities first Parish priest, Father G. Willems. Also, the French spelling was chosen (rather than the Dutch name Brussel or the English name Brussels) most likely because the Archbishop and the archdiocese were Francophone.

The original town site lay some 3 km (two miles) north of its current location. It was moved because the original town site was considered a poor location.

== Film ==
The community was the setting for the 2003 National Film Board of Canada animated short Louise, which explored a day in the life of filmmaker Anita Lebeau's 96-year-old Belgian Canadian grandmother, Louise Marginet, a Bruxelles resident.

== Notable people ==
- Étienne Gaboury CM OM, Architect

== See also ==
- Immigration to Canada
- List of regions of Manitoba
- List of rural municipalities in Manitoba
