= Notre-Dame-de-Lourdes, Manitoba =

Unincorporated community in Manitoba

Notre-Dame-de-Lourdes
- Unincorporated community
- Location within Manitoba
- Coordinates: 49°31′59″N 98°33′28″W
- Country: Canada
- Province: Manitoba
- Region: Central Plains
- Rural Municipality: Lorne

Area
  - Total: 2.83 km^{2} (1.09 sq mi)

Population (2021)
  - Total: 756
  - Density: 267/km^{2} (692/sq mi)
- Area codes: Area codes 204 and 431
- Website: www.notre-dame-de-lourdes.ca

Notre Dame de Lourdes is an unincorporated community recognized as a local urban district in the Municipality of Lorne within the Canadian province of Manitoba that held village status prior to January 1, 2015. It is located within the Central Plains Region, 100 km southwest of Winnipeg. The community had a population of 683 inhabitants in the 2011 census, an increase of 16.0% from the 589 inhabitants during the 2006 census.

The community's name (English: Our Lady of Lourdes) is a reference to the Marian apparition that is said to have appeared before Saint Bernadette in Lourdes, France.

== History ==
The site of Notre-Dame-de-Lourdes lies in Ojibwa country. Canadian pioneer explorer Pierre Gaultier de Varennes et de la Vérendrye traveled through the area in 1738 while seeking to establish a route to the western oceans.

The first settlers, from present-day Quebec, arrived in the 1880s. The post office was established in 1892 on 36-6-9W. Father Dom Benoît became the parish's first priest after arriving with French and Swiss immigrants. He also established a seminary of the Canons Regulaires with about 30 students but changes to the rules from Rome caused its dissolution.

A CNR railway point was established in 1912.

== Demographics ==
In the 2021 Census of Population conducted by Statistics Canada, Notre Dame de Lourdes had a population of 756 living in 287 of its 296 total private dwellings, a change of 1.6% from its 2016 population of 744. With a land area of 2.83 km^{2} (1.09 sq mi), it had a population density of 267.1/km^{2} (691.9/sq mi) in 2021.

== Notable people ==
- Rhayne Vermette, filmmaker
- J.P. Vigier, hockey player
