= Pembina Valley Region =

Region of Manitoba, Canada

Coordinates: 49°18′30″N 98°20′00″W

- Region of Manitoba
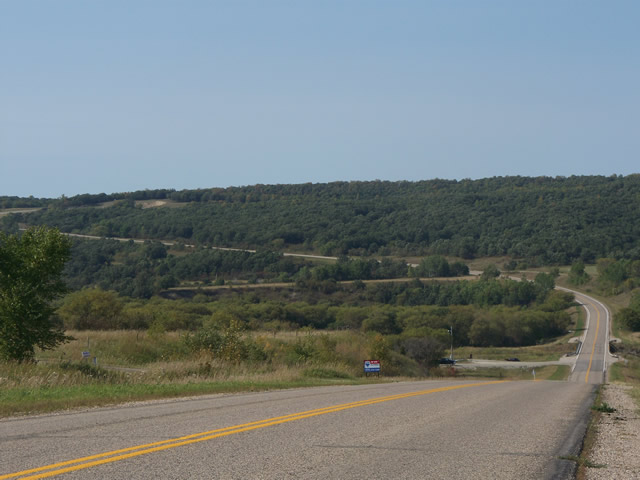
- Highway 31 crossing the Pembina Valley in Southern Manitoba.

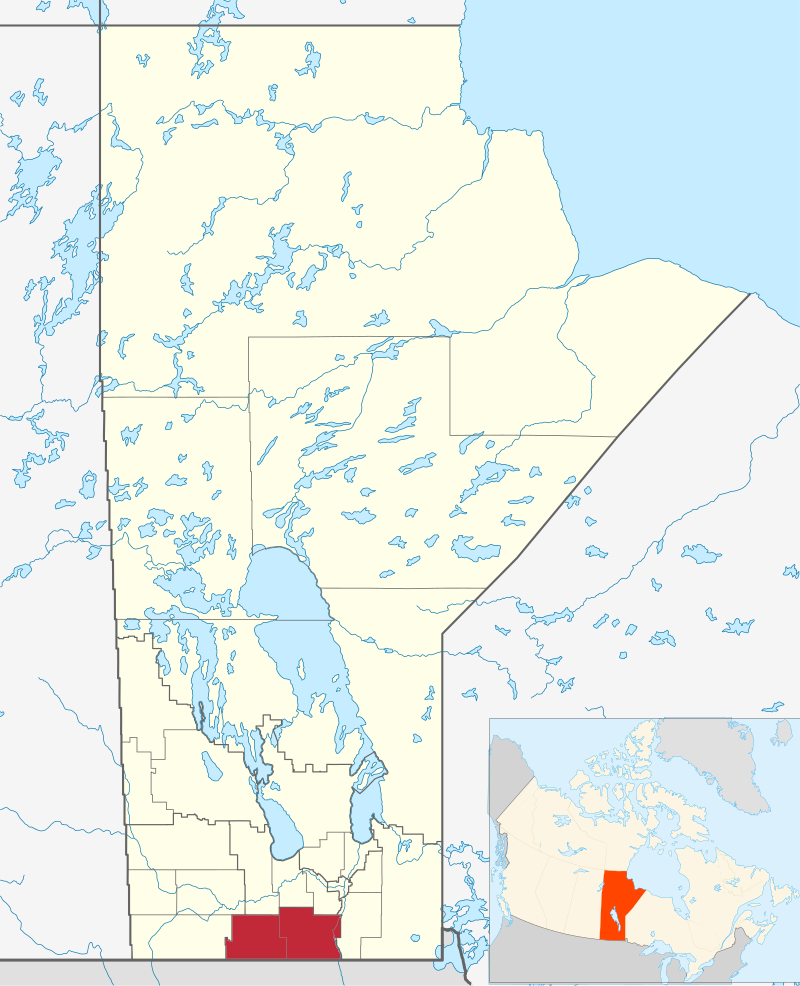
- Map of the Pembina Valley Region of Manitoba.
- Country: Canada
- Province: Manitoba

Area
  - Total: 9,774.87 km^{2} (3,774.10 sq mi)

Population (2021)
  - Total: 67,028
  - Density: 6.8572/km^{2} (17.760/sq mi)

The Pembina Valley /ˈpɛmbɪnə/ (French: Vallée-de-la-Pembina) is an informal geographic region of the Canadian province of Manitoba. It is named for its major geographical feature, the Pembina Valley, which runs through the southwestern part of the region.

The Pembina Valley had a population of 67,028 as of the Canada 2021 Census (Manitoba Census Areas 3 and 4). Its major service centres are the city of Winkler and the city of Morden. Other important towns include Altona and Carman.

The major industries of the Pembina Valley are agriculture and manufacturing.

The region is also home to Pembina Valley Provincial Park.

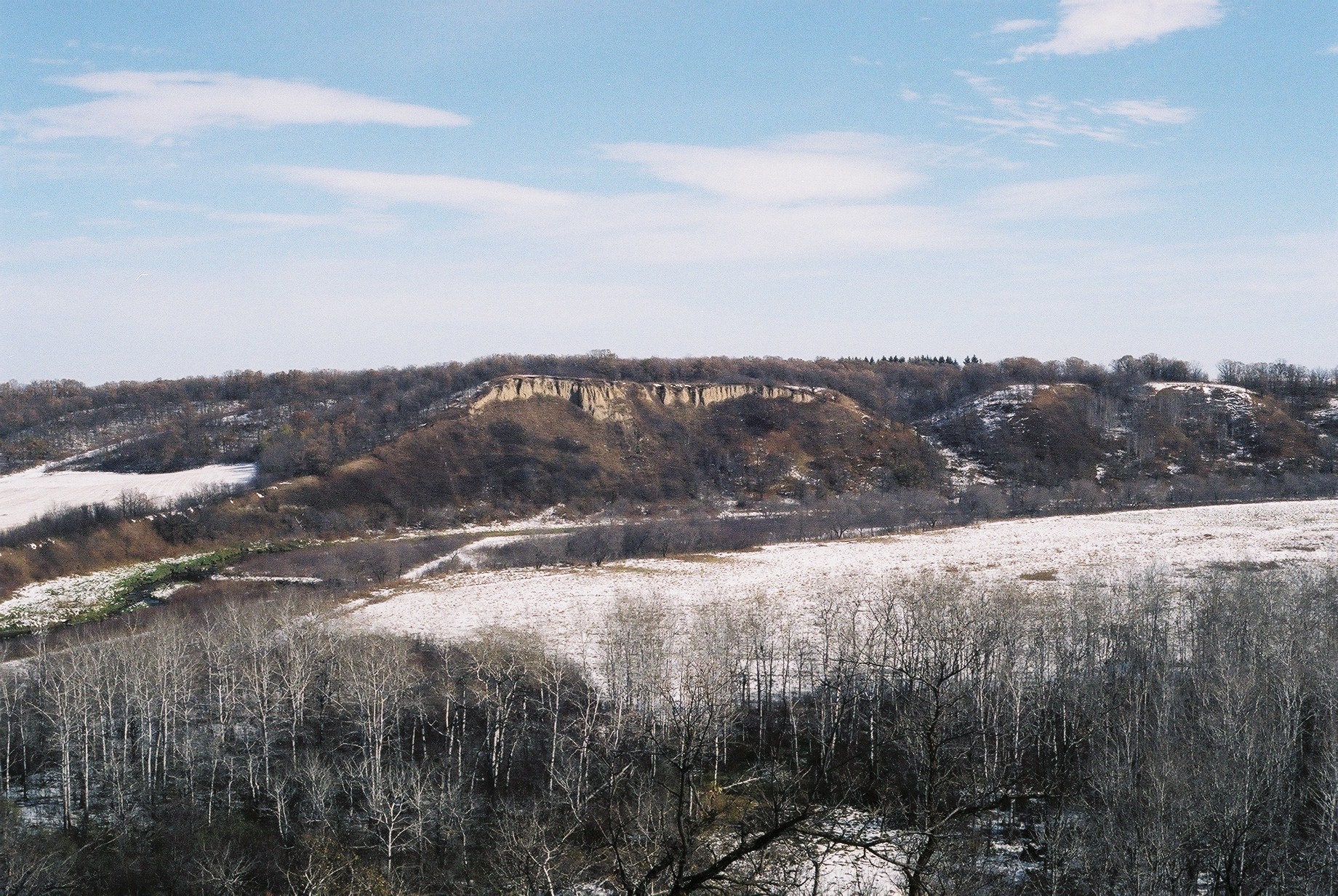
The Clay Banks buffalo jump, by Cartwright.

== Major communities ==
Name of population centre	Population (2021)	Status
Altona	4,267	Town
Carman	3,114	Town
Cartwright	302	LUD
Crystal City	389	LUD
Emerson	660	LUD
Gretna	541	LUD
Manitou	812	LUD
Morden	9,929	City
Morris	1,975	Town
Pilot Mound	675	LUD
Plum Coulee	1,040	LUD
Rosenort	798	LUD
Somerset	420	LUD
Winkler	13,745	City

== Sources ==
- Community Profile: Census Division No. 3, Manitoba; Statistics Canada
- Community Profile: Census Division No. 4, Manitoba; Statistics Canada
