= Manitoba Provincial Road 342 =

Provincial Road in Manitoba, Canada

Provincial Road 342
- PR 342 highlighted in red

Route information
- Maintained by Department of Infrastructure
- Length: 57.2 km (35.5 mi)
- Existed: 1966–present

Major junctions
- South end: PTH 3A in Clearwater
- PR 253 near Glenora; PTH 23 in Greenway
- North end: PTH 2 in Cypress River

Location
- Country: Canada
- Province: Manitoba
- Rural municipalities: Louise, Argyle, Glenboro-South Cypress, Victoria

Highway system
- Provincial highways in Manitoba; Winnipeg City Routes
← PR 341	→ PR 343

Provincial Road 342 (PR 342) is a 57.2-kilometre-long (35.5 mi) north–south highway in the Pembina Valley and Westman regions of Manitoba, Canada. Mostly a two-lane gravel road, it connects Clearwater with Glenora, Greenway, and Cypress River.

== Route description ==
PR 342 begins in the Municipality of Louise at the southern edge of Clearwater at a junction with PTH 3A. It winds its way through carved by Cypress Creek, passing under a railroad overpass and crossing the creek before entering downtown along Boundary Trail. In the centre of town, the highway makes a sharp right onto 11th Street N, following it northward through neighbourhoods before leaving Clearwater as it crosses another bridge over Cypress Creek, where the pavement transitions into gravel. PR 342 goes through several switchbacks as it winds its way northwest, lowering itself down into the Pembina River Valley to have an intersection with PR 442 and cross a bridge over the Pembina River. Entering the Rural Municipality of Argyle, it rises back out of the valley to run concurrently with PR 253, with the two heading due west along the northern side of Rock Lake before making a sharp right turn at a junction with an access road to the lake. Just east of Glenora, PR 342 splits off and heads east, then north through rural farmland for several kilometres, where it passes along the eastern edge of Greenway and has an intersection with PTH 23. Continuing north through rural areas, it has an intersection with PR 245 before going through a switchback to begin following the boundary line between the Municipality of Glenboro-South Cypress and the Rural Municipality of Victoria. Entering the town of Cypress River after crossing a former railway, the highway becomes paved as it travels along the western edge of downtown before coming to an end at a junction with PTH 2 (Red Coat Trail).

== Major intersections ==
Division	Location	km	mi	Destinations	Notes
Louise	Clearwater	0.0	0.0	PTH 3A – Killarney, Crystal City	Southern terminus; PTH 3A westbound is currently closed (bridge out); signed detour follows PR 342 northbound
Louise	Clearwater	0.5– 0.6	0.31– 0.37	Bridge over Cypress Creek	
Louise	Clearwater	1.0	0.62	Boundary Trail (Road 9N)	Signed PTH 3A detour follows Road 9N
Louise	Clearwater	1.8– 1.9	1.1– 1.2	Bridge over Cypress Creek; Pavement ends	
Louise		11.2	7.0	PR 442 south – Mather	Northern terminus of PR 442
Louise–Argyle boundary		12.1– 12.2	7.5– 7.6	Bridge over the Pembina River	
Argyle		13.7	8.5	PR 253 east – Pilot Mound	Southern end of PR 253 concurrency; pavement begins
Argyle		17.0	10.6	Road 74W – Rock Lake	
Argyle		20.3	12.6	PR 253 west – Glenora	Northern end of PR 253 concurrency; pavement ends
Argyle	Greenway	34.5	21.4	Wilson Avenue – Greenway	Pavement begins
Argyle	Greenway	35.1	21.8	PTH 23 – Baldur, Mariapolis	Pavement ends
Argyle		48.3	30.0	PR 245 east – Bruxelles	Western terminus of PR 245
Glenboro-South Cypress–Victoria boundary	Cypress River	56.4	35.0	Railway Avenue – Cypress River	Pavement begins
Glenboro-South Cypress–Victoria boundary	Cypress River	57.2	35.5	PTH 2 (Red Coat Trail) – Glenboro, Holland	Northern terminus; road continues north as Road 72W
1.000 mi = 1.609 km; 1.000 km = 0.621 mi: Concurrency terminus
