= Manitoba Provincial Road 253 =

Provincial road in Manitoba, Canada

Provincial Road 253
- PR 253 highlighted in red

Route information
- Maintained by Department of Infrastructure
- Length: 62.9 km (39.1 mi)
- Existed: 1966–present

Major junctions
- West end: PTH 18 near Killarney
- PTH 5 near Neelin; PR 342 near Glenora
- East end: PTH 3 / PTH 34 in Pilot Mound

Location
- Country: Canada
- Province: Manitoba
- Rural municipalities: Killarney-Turtle Mountain, Cartwright-Roblin, Prairie Lakes, Argyle, Louise

Highway system
- Provincial highways in Manitoba; Winnipeg City Routes
← PR 252	→ PR 254

Provincial Road 253 (PR 253) is a 62.9-kilometre-long (39.1 mi) east–west highway in the Westman and Pembina Valley regions of Manitoba. It serves as a paved connection to Killarney and Pilot Mound, providing access to Pleasant Valley and Glenora along the way. It crosses the Pembina River several times along its journey.

== Route description ==
PR 253 begins in the Municipality of Killarney-Turtle Mountain at an intersection with PTH 18 7 kilometres (4.3 mi) north of Killarney, heading due east to have its first crossing of the Pembina River before temporarily entering the Cartwright-Roblin Municipality to become concurrent (overlapped) with PR 458. The pair wind their way down into the Pembina River Valley, crossing the Pembina River for the second time just immediately south of Pleasant Valley and Pelican Lake. Entering the Rural Municipality of Prairie Lakes, the highway climbs its way up out of the valley, with PR 458 splitting off to head north shortly thereafter.

Continuing east, PR 253 enters the Rural Municipality of Argyle, having a short concurrency with PTH 5 (Parks Route) just north of Neelin before travelling along the northern side of Rock Lake. After passing through the centre of Glenora, it has a short concurrency with PR 342, with the highway making a couple of sharp turns before crossing the Pembina River and its river valley for the third and final time to enter the Municipality of Louise. PR 253 goes through a switchback at a junction with PR 440 before crossing the Goudney Reservoir via a causeway and entering Pilot Mound, travelling along the northern edge of town before coming to an end at an intersection with PTH 3 / PTH 34 (Boundary Commission Trail). The entire length of Manitoba Provincial Road 253 is a paved two-lane highway.

== Major intersections ==
Division	Location	km	mi	Destinations	Notes
Killarney-Turtle Mountain		0.0	0.0	PTH 18 – Killarney, Ninette	Western terminus
Killarney-Turtle Mountain		3.1	1.9	Bridge over the Pembina River	
Cartwright-Roblin		13.2	8.2	PR 458 south – Holmfield	Western end of PR 458 concurrency
Cartwright-Roblin		15.3	9.5	Bridge over the Pembina River	
Prairie Lakes		17.4	10.8	PR 458 north – Pleasant Valley, Belmont	Eastern end of PR 458 concurrency
Argyle		25.6	15.9	PTH 5 north (Parks Route) – Glenboro	Western end of PTH 5 concurrency
Argyle		27.1	16.8	PTH 5 south (Parks Route) – Cartwright	Eastern end of PTH 5 concurrency
Argyle		40.5	25.2	PR 342 north – Cypress River	Western end of PR 342 concurrency
Argyle		43.8	27.2	Road 74W – Rock Lake	
Argyle		47.1	29.3	PR 342 south – Clearwater	Eastern end of PR 342 concurrency
Argyle		48.8	30.3	Road 71W – Marringhurst Heritage House	
Argyle–Louise boundary		51.0	31.7	Bridge over the Pembina River	
Louise		55.5	34.5	PR 440 north – Mariapolis	Southern terminus of PR 440
Louise	Pilot Mound	61.7	38.3	Broadway Avenue – Pilot Mound	
Louise	Pilot Mound	62.9	39.1	PTH 3 (Boundary Commission Trail) / PTH 34 – Morden, Killarney	Eastern terminus
1.000 mi = 1.609 km; 1.000 km = 0.621 mi: Concurrency terminus
