= Manitoba Highway 34 =

Provincial highway in Manitoba, Canada

Provincial Trunk Highway 34
- PTH 30 highlighted in red
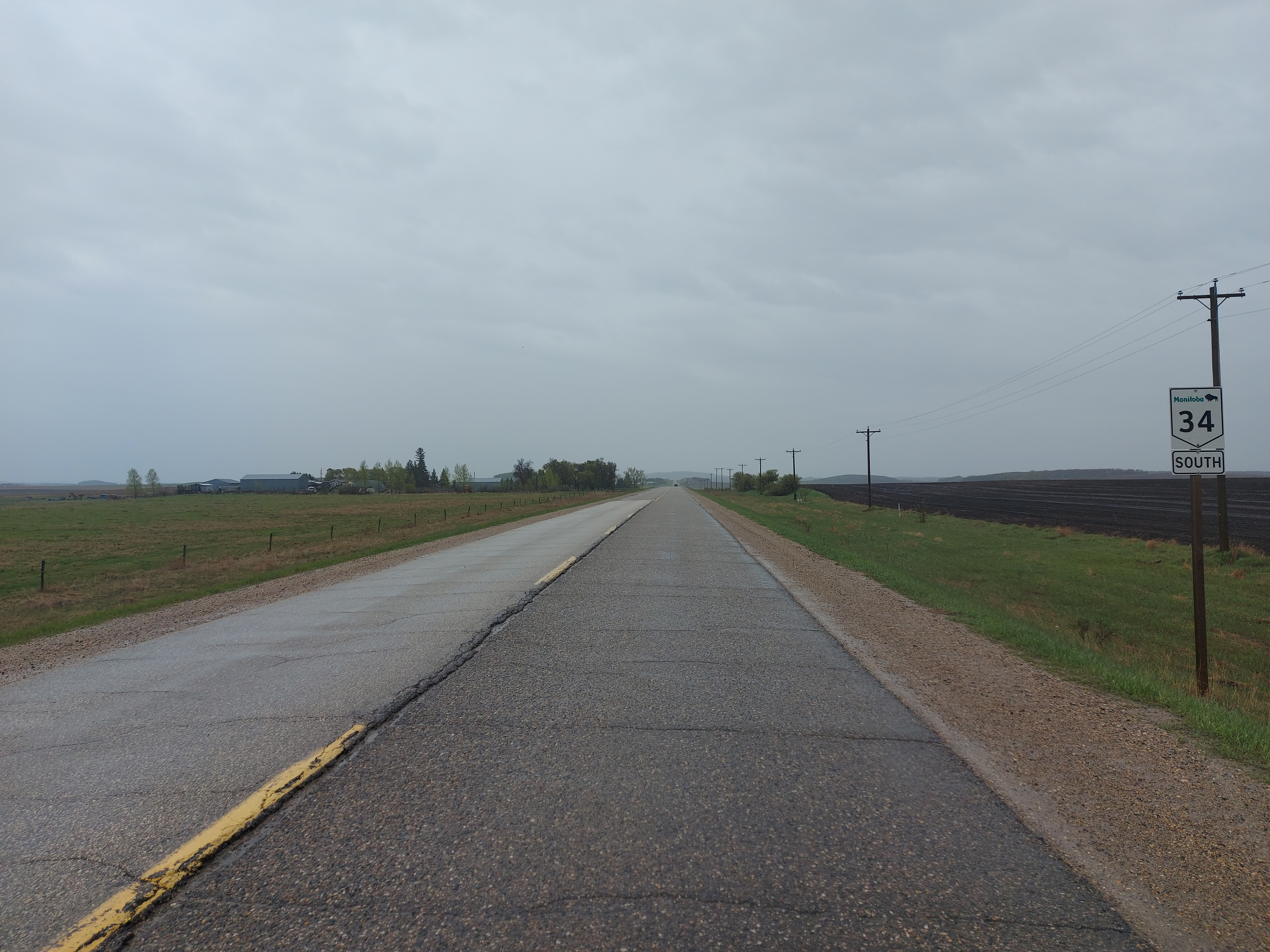
- Highway 34

Route information
- Maintained by Department of Infrastructure
- Length: 142 km (88 mi)
- Existed: 1955–present

Major junctions
- South end: ND 20 at the U.S. border near Crystal City
- PTH 3 from Crystal City to Pilot Mound; PTH 23 at Swan Lake; PTH 2 at Holland; PTH 1 (TCH) at Austin
- North end: PTH 16 (TCH) / YH at Gladstone

Location
- Country: Canada
- Province: Manitoba
- Rural municipalities: Lorne; Louise; Victoria; WestLake–Gladstone

Highway system
- Provincial highways in Manitoba; Winnipeg City Routes
← PTH 32	→ PTH 39

Provincial Trunk Highway 34 (PTH 34) is a provincial primary highway located in the Canadian province of Manitoba. It runs from the U.S. border (where it meets with ND 20) to PTH 16 (Yellowhead Highway) at the town of Gladstone.

PTH 34 is two lanes and runs north-south in the south-central region of the province. It is the main highway for the towns of Crystal City, Pilot Mound, and Holland. While the village of Austin is actually located 1 km east of the highway along PTH 1, the highway itself provides access to Austin's Agricultural Museum, which hosts the annual Thresherman's Reunion and Stampede each July.

The speed limit is 90 km/h (55 mph).

== Route description ==
PTH 34 begins in the Municipality of Louise at the North Dakota border, with the road continuing south towards Sarles, Calvin, and Devils Lake as North Dakota Highway 20 (ND 20). It heads north through rural farmland for a few kilometres, crossing Cypress Creek and becoming concurrent (overlapped) with PTH 3 (Boundary Commission Trail) to travel through the town of Crystal City, where they cross Crystal Creek and junction with PTH 3A and PR 423. The highway travels along the eastern edge of town before curving northeast to leave Crystal City and enter the town of Pilot Mound a few kilometres later. The road travels along the eastern edge, and mostly bypasses, the town, having an intersection with PR 253 here. They leave Pilot Mound and come to a T-intersection, with PTH 3 and the Boundary Commission Trail continue straight towards Morden, and PTH 34 turning due northward to enter the Rural Municipality of Lorne.

PTH 34 crosses the Pembina River at the eastern edge of Swan Lake to enter the Swan Lake First Nation, where it junctions with PTH 23. It leaves the reserve and heads through rural farmland for several kilometres, having a short concurrency with PR 245 near Bruxelles before going through a switchback to enter the Rural Municipality of Victoria. The travels along the eastern edge of the town of Holland, where it has intersections with PR 449 and PTH 2 (Red Coat Trail), before crossing the Assiniboine River and winding its way through wooded areas to enter the Municipality of North Norfolk.

PTH 34 re-enters farmland and travels through Pratt, having an intersection with PR 352, and winding it way north to pass along the western side of Austin, where it crosses a railroad track and PTH 1 (Trans-Canada Highway). The highway heads north through rural farmland for several kilometres, crossing into the Rural Municipality of WestLake – Gladstone near Pine Creek Station.

PTH 34 crosses Pine Creek and heads through rural areas for a few kilometres, passing by Gladstone Aerodrome and crossing over another creek before entering the town of Gladstone, where it comes to an end at an intersection with PTH 16 (Yellowhead Highway) on the south side of town. The road continues north as Morris Avenue into downtown.

The entire length of Highway 34 is a rural, paved, two-lane highway.

== History ==
PTH 34 first appeared on the 1955 Manitoba Highway Map. When it was first added, the highway was a much shorter route between Gladstone and Holland, with the southern terminus located at PTH 2. The highway's southern terminus was extended to PTH 23 in 1957, and then to PTH 3 the following year.

The section between PTH 3 and the US border was originally designated as PTH 17. This southernmost portion was redesignated to PTH 34 in 1964.

When the highway was initially added, it was originally slated to end at PTH 3 in the south and PTH 4 (now PTH 16) in the north. As a result, the highway was designated as PTH 34 to reflect this configuration.

== Major intersections ==
Division	Location	km	mi	Destinations	Notes
Louise		0	0.0	ND 20 south – Calvin, Devils Lake, Jamestown	Continuation into North Dakota
Louise		0	0.0	Canada–United States border at the Sarles–Crystal City Border Crossing	
Louise		5	3.1	Mile 3N	Former PR 201 east
Louise		10	6.2	PTH 3 west – Killarney	South end of PTH 3 concurrency
Louise		15	9.3	PTH 3A west / PR 423 east – Clearwater	
Louise	Crystal City	17	11		
Louise	Pilot Mound	24	15	PR 253 west – Glenora	
Louise		29	18	PTH 3 east – Morden	North end of PTH 3 concurency
Lorne	Swan Lake First Nation	48	30	PTH 23 – Ninette, Swan Lake	
Lorne		58	36	PR 245 west – Bruxelles	South end of PR 245 concurrency
Lorne		63	39	PR 245 east – Notre-Dame-de-Lourdes, Roseisle, Carman	North end of PR 245 east concurrency
Victoria	Holland	70	43	PR 449 east – Notre-Dame-de-Lourdes	
Victoria	Holland	72	45	PTH 2 – Souris, Elm Creek	
Victoria		85	53	Crosses over Assiniboine River	
Victoria		89	55	Ladysmith Road	Former PR 350 north
Victoria – North Norfolk boundary		96	60	Mile 55N	Former PR 461 east
North Norfolk		100	62	PR 352 north – Sidney	
North Norfolk	Austin	113	70	PTH 1 (TCH) – Brandon, Winnipeg	
North Norfolk		123	76	Mile 70N	Former PR 353 west
WestLake – Gladstone	Gladstone	142	88	PTH 16 (TCH) / YH – Neepawa, Portage la Prairie	PTH 34 northern terminus; continues north as Morris Avenue (former PR 460 north)
1.000 mi = 1.609 km; 1.000 km = 0.621 mi: Concurrency terminus; Route transition

== Related route ==
Provincial Road 449
- Location: Rural Municipality of Victoria
- Length: 16.3 km (10.1 mi)
- Existed: 1966–present

Provincial Road 449 (PR 449) is a 16.3-kilometre-long (10.1 mi) east-west spur of PTH 34 mostly within the Rural Municipality of Victoria. It runs westward from the town of Holland, providing access to rural areas of the RM.

Beginning at the tri-point where the Rural Municipalities of Lorne, Norfolk Treherne, and Victoria meet, PR 449 heads north from a junction with PR 245 along Road 56W for a couple kilometres along the boundary between the RM's of Norfolk Treherne and Victoria before making a sharp left onto Road 38N, fully entering the RM of Victoria. After heading due west for a good distance, it curves north onto Road 58W as it briefly passes through a wooded area, making a sharp left onto Road 39N shortly thereafter. The highway continues west for several kilometres, curving onto Road 60W to cross a causeway over the now drained Pellys Lake before making a sharp left turn onto Road 40N. PR 449 comes to an end along the outskirts of Holland at a junction with PTH 34, with Road 40N continuing west into town. PR 449 is entirely a gravel, two lane road travelling through mostly rural farmland.

Division	Location	km	mi	Destinations	Notes
Victoria	Holland	0.0	0.0	PTH 34 to PTH 2 (Red Coat Trail) – Austin, Pilot Mound; Road 40N – Holland	Western terminus; road continues west as Road 40N
Lorne / Norfolk Treherne / Victoria boundary		16.3	10.1	PR 245 – Notre Dame de Lourdes, Bruxelles	Eastern terminus
1.000 mi = 1.609 km; 1.000 km = 0.621 mi
