= Manitoba Highway 3 =

Highway in Manitoba, Canada

Provincial Trunk Highway 3
- Boundary Commission Trail
- PTH 3 highlighted in red

Route information
- Maintained by Department of Infrastructure
- Length: 396.1 km (246.1 mi)
- Existed: 1928–present

Major junctions
- West end: Highway 18 at Saskatchewan border near Pierson
- PTH 83 at Melita; PTH 21 near Deloraine; PTH 10 near Boissevain; PTH 5 at Cartwright; PTH 34 near Pilot Mound and Crystal City; PTH 14 between Morden and Winkler; PTH 23 near Roland; PTH 13 at Carman; PTH 2 at Oak Bluff; PTH 100 (TCH) at Oak Bluff
- East end: Route 155 at Winnipeg city limits

Location
- Country: Canada
- Province: Manitoba
- Rural municipalities: Boissevain-Morton, Brenda-Waskada, Cartwright-Roblin, Deloraine-Winchester, Dufferin, Killarney-Turtle Mountain, Louise, Macdonald, Pembina, Roland, Stanley, Two Borders
- Major cities: Morden, Winnipeg
- Towns: Carman, Melita

Highway system
- Provincial highways in Manitoba; Winnipeg City Routes
← PTH 2	→ PTH 3A

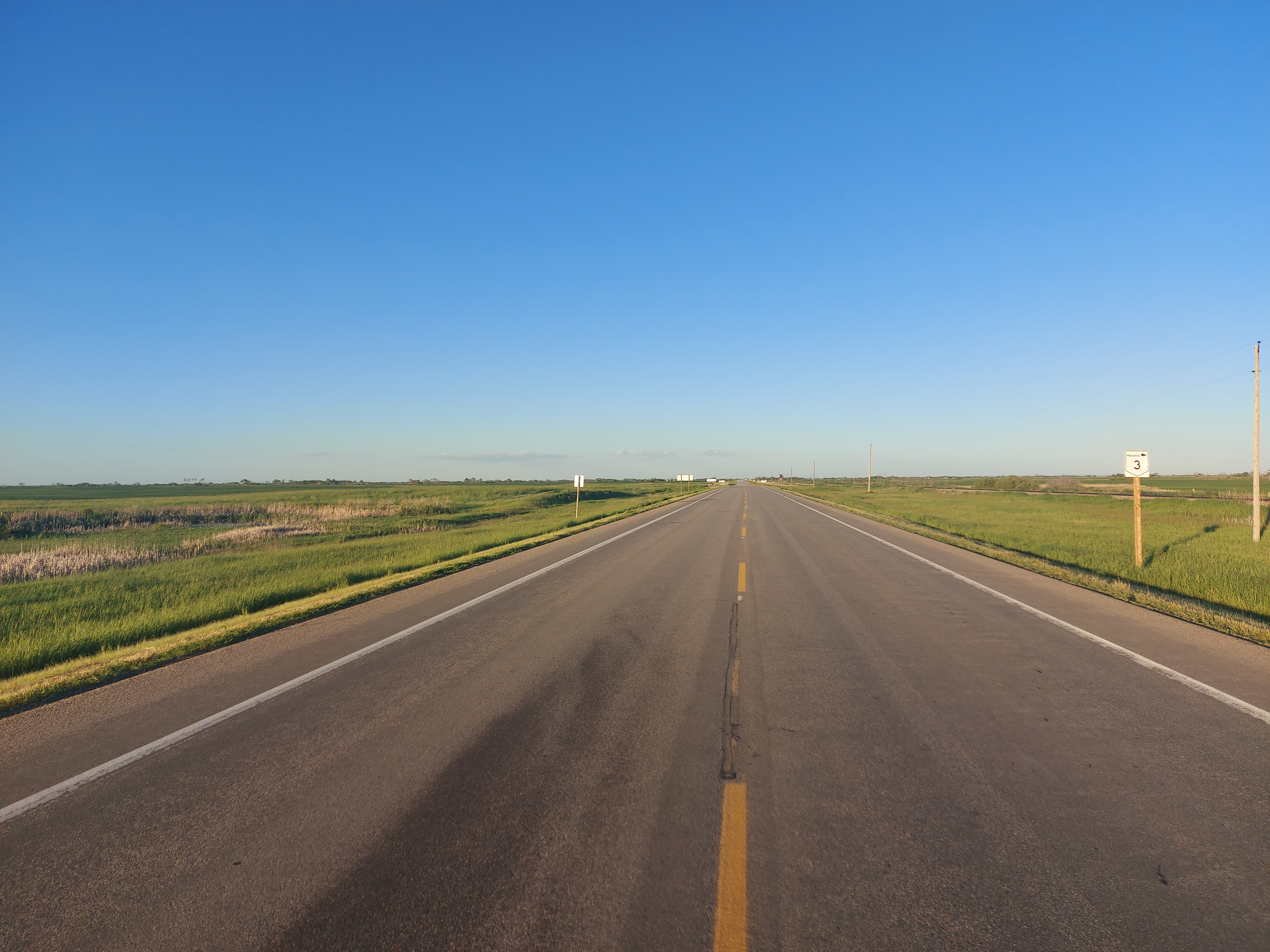
Highway 3 at its western terminus

Provincial Trunk Highway 3 (PTH 3) is a major provincial highway located in the Canadian province of Manitoba. It runs from the Saskatchewan boundary (where it meets Highway 18) to the southwest city limits of Winnipeg, where it continues as Winnipeg Route 155 (McGillivray Boulevard). Prior to the implementation of Winnipeg's City Route System, it extended to Pembina Highway.

West of its junction of PTH 14, PTH 3 is designated as the Boundary Commission Trail, commemorating the historic red river cart trail which connected western communities to the North-Western Territory and to British Columbia.

== Route description ==
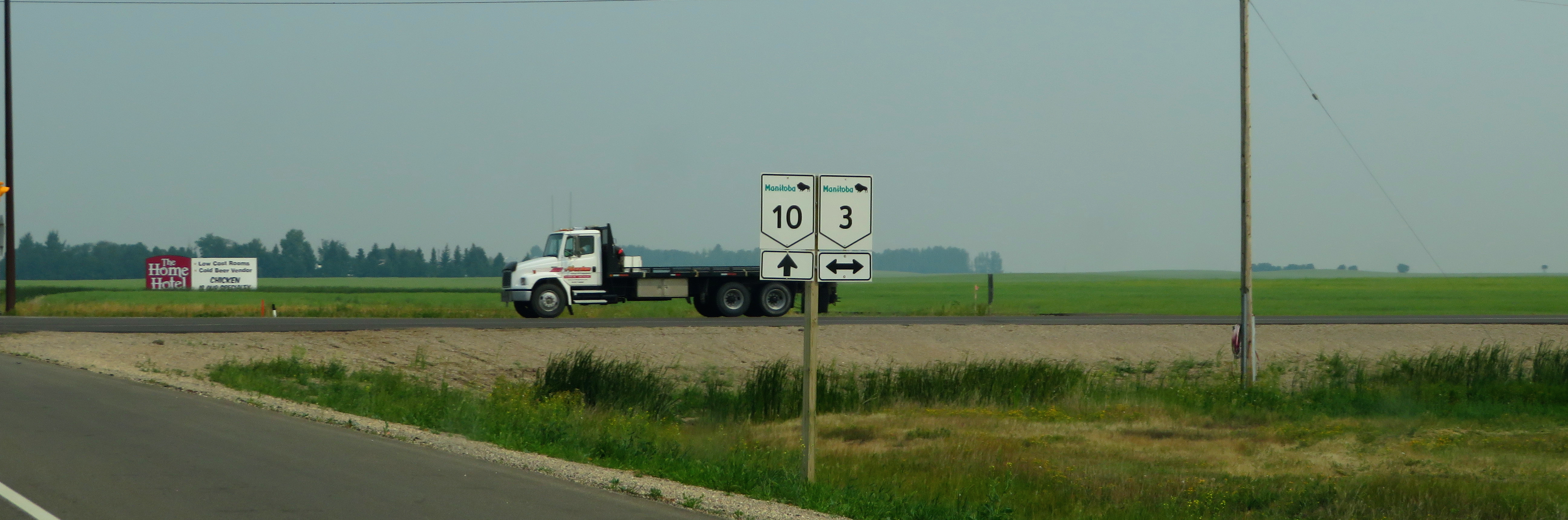
Junction between PTH 3 and PTH 10, between Bossevain and the International Peace Garden

PTH 3, and the Boundary Commission Trail, begins at the Saskatchewan border, with the road continuing east Saskatchewan Highway 18 (Hwy 18) towards Gainsborough and Estevan. The highway heads east to bypass Pierson to the north, where it has a short concurrency (overlap) with PR 256 and crosses a railway line. It now leaves Pierson behind and heads for several kilometres, having an intersection with PR 252 near Elva before joining PTH 83 in a concurrency and heading north up the Souris River valley. They enter the town of Melita, where they have a junction with PR 445 before PTH 3 splits off and heads east along the southern edge of town. The highway crosses the Souris River to leave Melita, and the river valley, to head for a few kilometres to cross into the Municipality of Brenda-Waskada at its first intersection PR 452.

PR 452 joins PTH 3 in a concurrency for roughly 4 kilometres (2.5 mi) before splitting and heading south towards Waskada. PTH 3 curves to the southeast, after crossing another railway track, to pass through Medora, where it has a short concurrency with PR 254, before curving back eastward to cross into the Municipality of Deloraine-Winchester. The highway now shares a roughly 8-kilometre-long (5.0 mi) concurrency with PTH 21 before splitting off at Deloraine, though it mainly bypasses the town along its western and southern sides. PTH 3 travels near the southern coastline of Whitewater Lake (as well as just 10 kilometres (6.2 mi) north of Turtle Mountain), where it junctions with PR 450 (which leads to Lake Metigoshe) before crossing into the Municipality of Boissevain-Morton.

PTH 3 crosses several streams and creeks as it makes its way to an intersection with PTH 10 (John Bracken Highway), roughly halfway between the town of Bossevain and the recreation areas of Turtle Mountain Provincial Park and the International Peace Garden. The highway crosses into the Municipality of Killarney-Turtle Mountain shortly thereafter, having a junction with PR 346 near Ninga before entering the town of Killarney. It passes through some neighbourhoods along the southern edge of town as it travels along the southern coastline of Killarney Lake to come to an intersection with PTH 18. PTH 3 joins PTH 18 and the two head south to leave Killarney and head south for a few kilometres before PTH 3 splits off near Lena, heading east to have a junction with PR 458 near Holmfield before entering the Municipality of Cartwright-Roblin.

PTH 3 travels through the town of Cartwright, where it has an intersection with PTH 5 (Parks Route) and crosses Badger Creek, before continuing east to have a junction with PR 442 just south of Mather before entering the Municipality of Louise. It has an intersection with its alternate route, PTH 3A near Clearwater, before crossing Cypress Creek and becoming concurrent with PTH 34. They head north through Crystal City, having another intersection with PTH 3A and PR 423, and Pilot Mound, where it has an intersection with PR 253, before PTH 3 splits off and heads eastward into the Municipality of Pembina.

PTH 3 now goes through some switchbacks as it crosses the Pembina River valley, having a short concurrency with PR 242 in the town of La Rivière. The highway leaves the river valley behind and heads due east to Manitou, where it has an intersection with PR 244 and starts paralleling a railroad. It makes a short jog to the south for a couple kilometres before curving back eastward to have an intersection with PR 528. PTH 3 travels along the southern edge of Darlingford, where it junctions with PTH 31 and PR 240, before travelling into the Rural Municipality of Stanley.

PTH 3 travels through the community of Thornhill before entering the city of Morden, passing directly through the city centre and having an intersection with PR 432, though it does avoid downtown just a few blocks to the south. The highway widens to a four-lane divided highway as it leaves the city, heading east for 6 kilometres (3.7 mi) to come to an intersection with PTH 14 just outside the city of Winkler, where PTH 3 heads north as a two-lane and Boundary Commission Trail follows PTH 14 eastward to PTH 32. The highway passes by Winkler Bible Camp before entering and travelling through the Rural Municipality of Roland for the next several kilometres, having a junction with PTH 23 near Roland, before crossing Shannon Creek and entering the Rural Municipality of Dufferin.

PTH 3 enters the town of Carman and travels through a neighbourhood before coming to an intersection between PTH 13 and PR 245 in a business district just south of downtown, with PTH 3 turning right and heading eastward to travel through another neighbourhood before leaving Carman and heading eastward through Homewood to cross into the Rural Municipality of Morris.

PTH 3 immediately passes through Sperling, where it has an intersection with both PR 205 and PR 336, before curving northeastward, paralleling a railroad line to enter the Rural Municipality of Macdonald and travel through Brunklid, where it has intersections with PR 305 and PR 332. The highway now passes through Sanford, where shares concurrencies with PR 334 and PR 247, as well as crossing the La Salle River. PTH 3 enters Oak Bluff at a roundabout intersection with PTH 2 (Red Coat Trail), continuing northeast along the eastern edge of the community to an intersection with PTH 100 (South Perimeter Highway / Trans-Canada Highway). Winnipeg Route 155 (Route 155) starts here, and the two head northeast concurrent with each other along McGillivray Boulevard to the Winnipeg city limits in the Fort Whyte neighbourhood, at an intersection with Brady Road. PTH 3 ends and Route 155 / McGillivray Boulevard continue into the city.

The entire length of Manitoba Provincial Trunk Highway 3, with the exception of the short section between Morden and Winkler, is a rural two-lane highway.

== History ==
PTH 3 formerly extended into the present-day city of Winnipeg. Prior to 1966, PTH 3 followed McGillivray Boulevard to PTH 75 (Pembina Highway) in the then separate municipality of Fort Garry, which was amalgamated into Winnipeg in 1971. When the Winnipeg Metro Routes were established in c. 1966, the section of PTH 3 inside the Perimeter Highway became Winnipeg Route 155. Today, the section of highway between the Perimeter Highway and Winnipeg city limits is cosigned as PTH 3 / Route 155.

== Major intersections ==
Division	Location	km	mi	Destinations	Notes
Two Borders		0.0	0.0	Highway 18 west – Estevan	Continuation into Saskatchewan; west end of Boundary Commission Trail
Two Borders	Pierson	10.0	6.2	PR 256 north – Tilston	West end of PR 256 concurrency
Two Borders		10.6	6.6	PR 256 south – Lyleton, Minot	East end of PR 256 concurrency
Two Borders		13.4	8.3	Road 166 West	Former PR 456 south
Two Borders		19.9	12.4	PR 252 north – Elva	
Two Borders		24.9	15.5	PTH 83 south – Minot	West end of PTH 83 concurrency
Town of Melita		36.9	22.9	PR 445 west	
Town of Melita		37.4	23.2	PTH 83 north – Virden	East end of PTH 83 concurrency
Two Borders		40.7	25.3	Road 154 West	Former PR 458 south
Two Borders–Brenda-Waskada boundary		47.3	29.4	PR 452 north – Napinka	West end of PR 452 concurrency
Brenda-Waskada		50.6	31.4	PR 452 south – Waskada	East end of PR 452 concurrency
Brenda-Waskada	Medora	58.9	36.6	PR 254 north – Lauder	West end of PR 254 concurrency
Brenda-Waskada	Medora	59.3	36.8	PR 254 south	East end of PR 254 concurrency
Deloraine-Winchester		72.4	45.0	PTH 21 north – Hartney	West end of PTH 21 concurrency
Deloraine-Winchester	Deloraine	80.6	50.1	PTH 21 south – Bottineau	East end of PTH 21 concurrency
Deloraine-Winchester		94.1	58.5	PR 450 south – Lake Metigoshe Recreation Area	
Boissevain-Morton		108.7	67.5	Road 119 West – Max Lake	Former PR 446 south
Boissevain-Morton		113.9	70.8	PTH 10 (John Bracken Highway) – Boissevain, Peace Garden	
Killarney-Turtle Mountain		127.1	79.0	PR 346 north – Ninga	
Killarney-Turtle Mountain		129.9	80.7	Road 106 West	Former PR 346 south
Killarney-Turtle Mountain	Killarney	143.1	88.9	PTH 18 north – Ninette	West end of PTH 18 concurrency
Killarney-Turtle Mountain		152.3	94.6	PTH 18 south – Rolla	East end of PTH 18 concurrency
Killarney-Turtle Mountain		165.5	102.8	PR 458 north – Holmfield	former PR 340 north
Cartwright-Roblin	Cartwright	175.2	108.9	PTH 5 (Parks Route) – Glenboro, Jamestown	Former PTH 28 south / PR 258 north
Cartwright-Roblin		186.6	115.9	PR 442 north – Mather	
Louise		198.1	123.1	PTH 3A east – Clearwater	
Louise		204.7	127.2	PTH 34 south – Devils Lake	West end of PTH 34 concurrency
Louise		209.6	130.2	PTH 3A west / PR 423 east – Clearwater	
Louise	Crystal City	211.2	131.2		
Louise	Pilot Mound	219.0	136.1	PR 253 west – Glenora	
Louise		223.2	138.7	PTH 34 north – Holland	East end of PTH 34 concurrency
Pembina		235.3	146.2	PR 242 north – Somerset	West end of PR 242 concurrency
Pembina	La Rivière	235.9	146.6	PR 242 south – Snowflake	East end of PR 242 concurrency
Pembina	Manitou	264.4	164.3	PR 244 north – Notre Dame de Lourdes	
Pembina		255.6	158.8	PR 528 south – Kaleida	
Pembina		263.4	163.7	PTH 31 south / PR 240 north – St. Claude, Langdon	
Stanley		273.3	169.8	Road 34 West – Miami, Thornhill	Former PR 338 north
City of Morden		279.6	173.7	Colert Road – Colert Beach	Former PR 434 south
City of Morden		281.5	174.9	PR 432 (Mountain Street)	
Stanley		289.7	180.0	PTH 14 east (Boundary Commission Trail) – Winkler	Boundary Commission Trail follows PTH 14 east
Roland		309.4	192.3	PTH 23 – Swan Lake, Roland	
Town of Carman		324.2	201.4	PR 245 west (4th Avenue S) – Roseisle PTH 13 north (Main Street) – Elm Creek	
Dufferin		337.2	209.5	Old 248 Road	Former PR 248
Morris	Sperling	345.4	214.6	PR 336 south / PR 205 east – Rosenort	
Macdonald	Brunkild	359.2	223.2	PR 305 – Ste. Agathe	
Macdonald	Brunkild	359.8	223.6	PR 332 – Starbuck, Lowe Farm	
Macdonald	Sanford	372.9	231.7	PR 247 west / PR 334 – Sanford, Domain	West end of PR 247 concurrency
Macdonald	Sanford	374.3	232.6	Mandan Drive / Road 46 NE	Former PR 247 west; PR 247 bridge across La Salle River closed in 2016
Macdonald		376.2	233.8	PR 247 east – La Salle	East end of PR 247 concurrency
Macdonald	Oak Bluff	386.6	240.2	PTH 2 (Red Coat Trail) – Treherne, Kenora	
Macdonald	Oak Bluff	387.7	240.9	Perimeter Highway (PTH 100 (TCH)) – Brandon, Kenora; Route 155 / McGillivray Boulevard begins	Route 155 western terminus; west end of Route 155 concurrency; interchange proposed
City of Winnipeg		396.1	246.1	PTH 3 ends / Brady Road south	Winnipeg city limits; PTH 3 eastern terminus; Route 155 continues
City of Winnipeg		401.8	249.7	Pembina Highway (Route 42)	Route 155 / former PTH 3 eastern terminus; former PTH 75
1.000 mi = 1.609 km; 1.000 km = 0.621 mi: Closed/former; Concurrency terminus; Route transition

== Related routes ==
=== Provincial Trunk Highway 3A ===
Provincial Trunk Highway 3A
- Location: Clearwater–Crystal City
- Length: 11.2 km (7.0 mi)
- Existed: 1960–present

Provincial Trunk Highway 3A (PTH 3A) is a 11.2-kilometre-long (7.0 mi) alternate route of PTH 3 in the Municipality of Louise, connecting the towns of Clearwater and Crystal City.

=== Provincial Road 450 ===
Provincial Road 450
- Location: Lake Metigoshe
- Length: 19.8 km (12.3 mi)
- Existed: 1966–present

Provincial Road 450 (PR 450) is a 19.8-kilometre-long (12.3 mi) north-south spur of PTH 3 in the Municipality of Deloraine-Winchester providing access to the Lake Metigoshe Recreation Area, as well as some other smaller lakes on the western half of Turtle Mountain and the Turtle Mountain Bible Camp, coming within 0.2 kilometres (0.12 mi) of the United States border. The entire length of PR 450 is a paved two-lane highway.

Division	Location	km	mi	Destinations	Notes
Deloraine-Winchester	Lake Metigoshe Recreation Area	0.0	0.0	Murray Drive / Hasselfield Road	Southern terminus
Deloraine-Winchester		19.8	12.3	PTH 3 (Boundary Commission Trail) – Deloraine, Killarney	Northern terminus
1.000 mi = 1.609 km; 1.000 km = 0.621 mi

=== Provincial Road 528 ===
Provincial Road 528
- Location: Kaleida
- Length: 8.2 km (5.1 mi)
- Existed: 1966–present

Provincial Road 528 (PR 528) is a 8.2-kilometre-long (5.1 mi) north-south spur of PTH 3 in the Municipality of Pembina, connecting it with the hamlet of Kaleida. It is a paved two-lane highway for its entire length.

Division	Location	km	mi	Destinations	Notes
Pembina	Kaleida	0.0	0.0	Church Street / Road 45W	Southern terminus; road continues south as Road 45W
Pembina		8.2	5.1	PTH 3 (Boundary Commission Trail) – Manitou, Darlingford	Northern terminus
1.000 mi = 1.609 km; 1.000 km = 0.621 mi
