= Manitoba Provincial Road 442 =

Provincial road in Manitoba, Canada

Provincial Road 442

Route information
- Maintained by Department of Infrastructure
- Length: 19.2 km (11.9 mi)
- Existed: 1966–present

Major junctions
- South end: PTH 3 near Mather
- North end: PR 342 near Clearwater

Location
- Country: Canada
- Province: Manitoba
- Rural municipalities: Cartwright-Roblin, Louise

Highway system
- Provincial highways in Manitoba; Winnipeg City Routes
← PR 440	→ PR 443

Provincial Road 442 (PR 442) is a 19.2-kilometre-long (11.9 mi) north–south highway in the Pembina Valley Region of southern Manitoba. It provides access to the hamlet of Mather as well as to the southern coastline of Rock Lake.

== Route description ==
PR 442 begins in the Cartwright-Roblin Municipality at an intersection with PTH 3 (Boundary Commission Trail) just south of Mather, heading north as a paved two-lane highway along the western boundary of town. Leaving Mather, the highway transitions to gravel at Government Allowance Road, traveling through rural farmland for a few kilometres before making a sudden sharp right onto Road 11N. It now winds its way along the southern coastline of Rock Lake before entering the Municipality of Louise, almost immediately crossing a bridge over Cypress Creek before coming to an end shortly thereafter at an intersection with PR 342 between Glenora and Clearwater.

== Major intersections ==
Division	Location	km	mi	Destinations	Notes
Cartwright-Roblin		0.0	0.0	PTH 3 (Boundary Commission Trail) – Crystal City, Killarney	Southern terminus; southern end of paved section; road continues south as Road 77W
Cartwright-Roblin	Mather	1.6	0.99	Government Allowance Road	Northern end of paved section
Cartwright-Roblin		8.2	5.1	Road 77W	Former PR 541 west
Louise		18.9	11.7	Bridge over Cypress Creek	
Louise		19.2	11.9	PR 342 – Rock Lake, Clearwater	Northern terminus
1.000 mi = 1.609 km; 1.000 km = 0.621 mi
