= Manitoba Highway 3A =

Highway in Manitoba

Provincial Trunk Highway 3A
- PTH 3A highlighted in red

Route information
- Auxiliary route of PTH 3
- Maintained by Manitoba Infrastructure
- Length: 11.2 km (7.0 mi)
- Existed: 1960–present

Major junctions
- West end: PTH 3 east of Mather
- PR 342 in Clearwater
- East end: PTH 3 / PTH 34 / PR 423 in Crystal City

Location
- Country: Canada
- Province: Manitoba
- Rural municipalities: Louise

Highway system
- Provincial highways in Manitoba; Winnipeg City Routes
← PTH 3	→ PTH 4

Provincial Trunk Highway 3A (PTH 3A) is a provincial primary highway located in the Canadian province of Manitoba. It runs from PTH 3 to the same route concurrent with PTH 34. The highway continues as PR 423 from its eastern terminus.

The highway serves as a direct connection to the town of Clearwater, and also is a shortcut. The speed limit is 90 km/h (55 mph).

== Route description ==
PTH 3A begins at an intersection with PTH 3 (Boundary Commission Trail) in a rural part of the Municipality of Louise. It heads north through the flat farmland of the prairies to cross a bridge over Cypress Creek (closed since 2016, signed detour in place via Road 71W, Road 9N, and the southernmost portion of PR 342) and pass along the eastern edge of Clearwater, where it has an intersection with PR 342 and makes a sharp curve to the east. The highway begins paralleling a former railroad line as it travels along the southern edge of Crystal City, where it comes to an end at an intersection with PTH 3 / PTH 34 (Boundary Commission Trail). The road continues east as gravel PR 423.

The entire length of Manitoba Provincial Trunk Highway 3A is a paved, rural, two-lane highway, located entirely in the Municipality of Louise.

== Bridge closure ==
Since 2016, PTH 3A has been split into two segments, both meeting a dead end at Cypress Creek. This due to the bridge across the creek being closed by the province due to safety concerns. The bridge was a concrete version of a Bowstring arch truss, originally built between 1919 and 1920 by the Winnipeg construction firm of Alex Gall and Company. Its original cost was $13,700. In deteriorating condition, the bridge was closed to vehicular traffic in 2016 and was demolished in spring 2018. There is a signed detour in place via Road 71W and Road 9N.

== Major intersections ==
Division	Location	km	mi	Destinations	Notes
Municipality of Louise		0.0	0.0	PTH 3 (Boundary Commission Trail) – Pilot Mound, Killarney	Western terminus
Municipality of Louise		4.1	2.5	Former Concrete Bowstring Arch bridge over Cypress Creek (closed since 2016)	
Municipality of Louise	Clearwater	4.3	2.7	PR 342 north – Clearwater	Southern terminus of PR 342
Municipality of Louise	Crystal City	10.7	6.6	Broadway Street – Crystal City	
Municipality of Louise	Crystal City	11.2	7.0	PTH 3 / PTH 34 (Boundary Commission Trail) – Killarney, Pilot Mound; PR 423 east	Eastern terminus; western terminus of PR 423
1.000 mi = 1.609 km; 1.000 km = 0.621 mi: Closed/former
