= Manitoba Provincial Road 423 =

Provincial road in Manitoba, Canada

Provincial Road 423
- PR 423 highlighted in red

Route information
- Maintained by Department of Infrastructure
- Length: 19.7 km (12.2 mi)
- Existed: 1966–present

Major junctions
- West end: PTH 3 / PTH 34 / PTH 3A in Crystal City
- East end: PR 242 near Snowflake

Location
- Country: Canada
- Province: Manitoba
- Rural municipalities: Louise

Highway system
- Provincial highways in Manitoba; Winnipeg City Routes
← PR 422	→ PR 424

Provincial Road 423 (PR 423) is a 19.7-kilometre-long (12.2 mi) east–west highway in the Pembina Valley Region of Manitoba. Essentially an eastern continuation of PTH 3A, it connects Crystal City with La Rivière and Snowflake via Purves. It is located entirely within the Municipality of Louise.

== Route description ==
PR 423 begins along the southern outskirts of Crystal City at a junction with PTH 3 / PTH 34 (Boundary Commission Trail), with the road continuing west towards Clearwater as PTH 3A. It heads due east as a two-lane gravel road, travelling through rural farmland as it passes just to the north of Purves, connected via a short section of Road 57W and Railway Street. The highway comes to an end a short time later at an intersection with PR 242 along the boundary with the Municipality of Pembina, roughly halfway between Snowflake and La Rivière.

== Major intersections ==
Division	Location	km	mi	Destinations	Notes
Louise	Crystal City	0.0	0.0	PTH 3 / PTH 34 (Boundary Commission Trail) – Killarney, Pilot Mound; PTH 3A west – Crystal City, Clearwater	Western terminus; eastern terminus of PTH 3A; road continues west as PTH 3A westbound
Louise		14.8	9.2	Road 57W to Railway Street – Purves	
Louise–Pembina boundary		19.7	12.2	PR 242 – La Rivière, Snowflake	Eastern terminus; road continues east as Road 9N
1.000 mi = 1.609 km; 1.000 km = 0.621 mi
