= Rural Municipality of Louise =

Rural municipality in Manitoba, Canada

Coordinates: 49°10′38″N 98°52′46″W

The Rural Municipality of Louise is a former rural municipality (RM) in the Canadian province of Manitoba. It was originally incorporated as a rural municipality on February 14, 1880. It ceased on January 1, 2015 as a result of its provincially mandated amalgamation with the Town of Pilot Mound and the Village of Crystal City to form the Municipality of Louise.

The former RM is located in the southern part of the province, on the border with the state of North Dakota in the United States. The 2006 Census reported a population of 819 persons, a 17.2% decline from the 2001 Census figure of 989 persons.

== Geography ==
According to Statistics Canada, the former RM had an area of 932.67 km^{2} (360.11 sq mi).

=== Communities ===
- Clearwater
- Fallison
- Purves
- Wood Bay

== Adjacent municipalities ==
- Rural Municipality of Roblin - (west)
- Rural Municipality of Argyle - (northwest)
- Rural Municipality of Lorne - (north)
- Rural Municipality of Pembina - (northeast & east)
- Cavalier County, North Dakota - (south)
- Towner County, North Dakota - (southwest)
