= Manitoba Provincial Road 458 =

Provincial road in Manitoba, Canada

Provincial Road 458

Route information
- Maintained by Department of Infrastructure
- Length: 38.9 km (24.2 mi)
- Existed: 1992–present

Major junctions
- South end: PTH 3 near Holmfield
- PR 253 near Pleasant Valley
- North end: PTH 23 near Belmont

Location
- Country: Canada
- Province: Manitoba
- Rural municipalities: Killarney-Turtle Mountain, Cartwright-Roblin, Prairie Lakes

Highway system
- Provincial highways in Manitoba; Winnipeg City Routes
← PR 457	→ PR 459

Provincial Road 458 (PR 458) is a 38.9-kilometre-long (24.2 mi) north–south highway in the Westman Region of Manitoba. It connects the towns of Holmfield and Belmont via Pleasant Valley.

== Route description ==
PR 458 begins along the border between the Municipality of Killarney-Tuttle Mountain and the Cartwright-Roblin Municipality at a junction with PTH 3 (Boundary Commission Trail), with the road continuing south as Road 90W. It heads north along the border to travel through the east side of Holmfield, where it crosses a bridge over the Long River, before going through a switchback to fully enter the Cartwright-Roblin Municipality. After joining a short concurrency with eastbound PR 253, where the cross the Pembina River into the Rural Municipality of Prairie Lakes, the highway heads through a switchback as it passes by the hamlet of Pleasant Valley before heading north through rural farmland for several kilometres, coming to an end just south of Belmont at an intersection with PTH 23, with the road continuing north into town as George Street. With the exclusion of the concurrency with PR 253, which is paved, the entire length of PR 458 is a gravel two-lane highway.

== History ==
Provincial Road 458
- Road 154W
- Location: Dalny
- Length: 19.9 km (12.4 mi)
- Existed: 1966–1992

PR 458 originated in 1966 as a designation for a 19.9-kilometre (12.4 mi) section of Road 154W in what was then the Rural Municipality of Arthur (now Municipality of Two Borders), providing road access to the hamlet of Dalny, as well as a connection between PR 251 and PTH 3 (Boundary Commission Trail). It was decommissioned in 1992 and is now a municipal road. PR 458 was designated along its current alignment in 1992, which was a part of a much longer PR 340 prior.

== Major intersections ==
Division	Location	km	mi	Destinations	Notes
Killarney-Turtle Mountain / Cartwright-Roblin boundary		0.0	0.0	PTH 3 (Boundary Commission Trail) – Cartwright, Killarney	Southern terminus; road continues south as Road 90W
Killarney-Turtle Mountain / Cartwright-Roblin boundary	Holmfield	5.2	3.2	Railway Avenue – Holmfield	
Killarney-Turtle Mountain / Cartwright-Roblin boundary	Holmfield	5.5	3.4	Bridge over the Long River	
Cartwright-Roblin		18.7	11.6	PR 253 west – Killarney	Southern end of PR 253 concurrency; southern end of paved section
Cartwright-Roblin		20.0	12.4	Bridge over the Pembina River	
Prairie Lakes		22.8	14.2	PR 253 east – Glenora	Northern end of PR 253 concurrency; northern end of paved section
Prairie Lakes		25.7	16.0	Pleasant Valley Road – Pleasant Valley	
Prairie Lakes		38.9	24.2	PTH 23 – Ninette, Baldur; George Street – Belmont	Northern terminus; road continues north as George Street (former PR 340 north)
1.000 mi = 1.609 km; 1.000 km = 0.621 mi: Concurrency terminus
