= Manitoba Provincial Road 258 =

Former provincial road in Manitoba, Canada

Provincial Road 258

Route information
- Maintained by Department of Infrastructure
- Length: 144 km (89 mi)
- Existed: 1966–1980

Major junctions
- North end: PTH 16 (TCH) (YH) at Neepawa
- PTH 1 (TCH); PR 351 at Carberry; PTH 2 at Glenboro; PTH 23 near Baldur
- South end: PTH 3 / PTH 28 at Cartwright

Location
- Country: Canada
- Province: Manitoba
- Towns: Carberry, Glenboro, Neelin

Highway system
- Provincial highways in Manitoba; Winnipeg City Routes
← PR 257	→ PR 259

Provincial Road 258 (PR 258) is a former provincial road in the Canadian province of Manitoba.

== Route description ==
PR 258 connected PTH 16 (PTH 4 prior to 1977) at the eastern edge of Neepawa to PTH 3 and PTH 28 at Cartwright. Between Neepawa and Cartwright, PR 258 passed through Carberry and Glenboro, as well as Spruce Woods Provincial Park, which is located between the two communities.

For a more detailed description of the route, see Highway 5.

== History ==
Along with PTH 28, PR 258 was decommissioned in its entirety when PTH 5 was extended from Neepawa to its current southern terminus in 1980.
