= Rural Municipality of Roblin =

Rural municipality in Manitoba, Canada

Coordinates: 49°07′59″N 99°16′47″W

The Rural Municipality of Roblin is a former rural municipality (RM) in the Canadian province of Manitoba. It was originally incorporated as a rural municipality on November 15, 1902. It ceased on January 1, 2015 as a result of its provincially mandated amalgamation with the Village of Cartwright to form the Cartwright – Roblin Municipality.

The former RM is located in the Pembina Valley Region of the province along the border of the state of North Dakota in the United States of America. According to the Canada 2006 Census, the former RM had a population of 964.

== Geography ==
According to Statistics Canada, the former RM had an area of 716.15 km^{2} (276.51 sq mi).

=== Communities ===
- Cartwright
- Mather

=== Adjacent municipalities ===
- Rural Municipality of Turtle Mountain - (west)
- Rural Municipality of Strathcona - (northwest)
- Rural Municipality of Argyle - (north)
- Rural Municipality of Louise - (east)
- Towner County, North Dakota - (south)

== See also ==
- Municipality of Roblin
