= Kaleida =

Kaleida may refer to the following:

- Kaleida (band), an English music duo
- Kaleida Health, a healthcare provider
- Kaleida Labs, a multimedia company
- Kaleida, Manitoba
