= Manitoba Highway 28 =

Road in Manitoba, Canada

Provincial Trunk Highway 28

Route information
- Maintained by Department of Infrastructure
- Length: 10.2 km (6.3 mi)
- Existed: 1959–1980

Major junctions
- South end: ND 69 (Canada–United States border) south of Cartwright
- North end: PTH 3 / PR 258 at Cartwright

Location
- Country: Canada
- Province: Manitoba

Highway system
- Provincial highways in Manitoba; Winnipeg City Routes
← PTH 27	→ PTH 30

Provincial Trunk Highway 28 (PTH 28) was a short provincial highway in the Canadian province of Manitoba.

The highway was used as a connector to PTH 3 and PR 258 at Cartwright and the U.S. border, where it continued as SR 69 in North Dakota (later redesignated as SR 4 in 1997).

== History ==
PTH 28 first appeared on the 1959 Manitoba Highway Map. Along with PR 258, PTH 28 was decommissioned in its entirety when PTH 5 was extended from Neepawa to its current southern terminus in 1980.

The original PTH 28 was designated from PTH 1 north of Griswold to PTH 4 in Shoal Lake. This became part of PTH 21 in 1949.

== See also ==
- Manitoba Highway 5
