= Robert J.C. Stead =

Canadian novelist (1880–1959)

Robert J. C. Stead
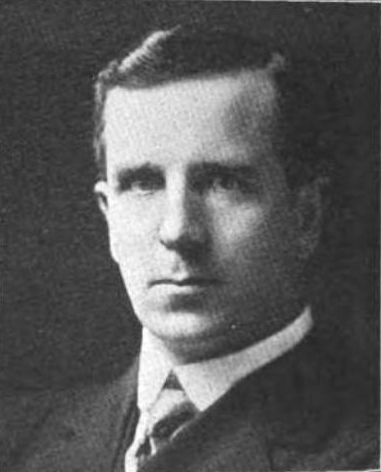
- Born: 4 September 1880; Middleville, Ontario
- Died: 25 June 1959 (aged 78); Ottawa, Ontario
- Occupation: Writer (novelist)
- Writing career
- Period: 20th century
- Genres: Fiction, poetry

Robert James Campbell Stead (4 September 1880 – 25 June 1959) was a Canadian novelist and poet.

Stead was born at Middleville, Ontario. The family homesteaded at Cartwright, Manitoba in 1882. He began a weekly newspaper in Cartwright in 1899, at the age of 18 years. His first book, The Empire Builders and Other Poems was published in 1908 and for the next 23 years, until 1931, he continued a steady flow of novels, short stories and books of verse, which enriched the portraiture of Canadian prairie life. As described by Terrence Craig, "In his early poetry, such as The Empire Builders and Other Poems (1908), Stead mixed with styles of Service and Kipling to produce a virulently nationalist concept of Canada and Canadians. This strain was continued when he turned to novels in 1914, and wartime tensions seemed to exacerbate his prejudices. His postwar novels are calmer, more tolerant and less romantic than his first work...".

For a significant period, Stead worked in the immigration department of the Canadian Pacific Railway in Calgary, where he produced "reams of rose-hued prose extolling the clean, healthy vigour of life in the open spaces—spaces opened courtesy of the CPR and available at good prices. On his own time, he writes in the same vein...", and became one of Canada's best-known authors.

Stead is best known for his novel Grain (1926). The novel Dry Water, which he wrote in the early 1930s but was unable to find a publisher for, due to the Depression of the times, was published by University of Ottawa Press in 2008.

Stead died in Ottawa.

== Works ==
- The Empire Builders And Other Poems, (1908)
- Prairie Born And Other Poems, (1911)
- Songs Of The Prairie, (1911)
- The Bail Jumper, (1914)
- The Homesteaders: A Novel Of The Canadian West, (1916)
- Kitchener And Other Poems, (1917)
- The Cow Puncher, (1918)
- Why Don't They Cheer?, (1918)
- Dennison Grant: A Novel Of To-day, (1920)
- Neighbours, (1922)
- The Smoking Flax, (1924)
- Zen Of The YD, (1925)
- Grain, (1926)
- The Copper Disc, (1931)
- Words, (1945)
- The Maple's Praise Of Franklin Delano Roosevelt, 1882-1945, (1945)
- Dry Water: A Novel Of Western Canada [edited by Prem VARMA] (1983)
