= Sarles–Crystal City Border Crossing =

Canada–United States border crossing

- US Border Inspection Station at Sarles, ND

Locaiton
- Country: United States; Canada
- Location: ND 20 / PTH 34; US Port: 10949 North Dakota Highway 20, Sarles, North Dakota 58372; Canadian Port: Manitoba Highway 34, Crystal City, Manitoba R0K 0N0
- Coordinates: 49°00′00″N 98°56′16″W

Details
- Opened: 1897

Website
- US Canadian

The Sarles–Crystal City Border Crossing connects the towns of Sarles, North Dakota and Crystal City, Manitoba on the Canada–United States border. North Dakota Highway 20 on the American side joins Manitoba Highway 34 on the Canadian side.

== Canadian side ==
In 1897, E.M. Kerr was the inaugural customs officer, such duties having previously been performed by the North-West Mounted Police. In 1899, the status was upgraded to an outport of entry under the administrative oversight of the Port of Winnipeg. The current station was built in 1955.

== US side ==
In 1961, the US built the Sarles border station in the median of the roadway. In 2012, this facility was replaced with a large modern border station. In 2014, the Sarles Port of Entry processed an average of 10 passenger cars and 3 trucks per day.

== See also ==
- List of Canada–United States border crossings
