= Rock Lake (Manitoba) =

Lake in Manitoba, Canada

- Location of the lake in Manitoba Rock Lake (Canada)
- Location: Manitoba, Canada
- Coordinates: 49°10′09″N 99°14′49″W
- Type: lake
- Max. length: 8 mi (13 km)
- Max. width: 0.75 mi (1.21 km)
- Surface area: 6.6 mi^{2} (17 km^{2})
- Average depth: 2.5 m (8 ft 2 in)
- Max. depth: 3.5 m (11 ft)

Rock Lake is the second largest navigable lake in southwestern Manitoba, Canada. It is about 8 miles (13 km) long and 0.75 miles (1.21 km) wide with a surface area of 6.6 square miles (17 km^{2}). Rock Lake is relatively shallow with a mean depth of 2.5 metres (8 ft 2 in) and a maximum of 3.5 metres (11 ft) when the lake is at a surface water level of 405.08 metres (1,329.0 ft). The summer target for the lake is 405.08 metres (1,329.0 ft). The lake is fed by several waterways the main ones being the Pembina River and Badger Creek. The total drainage area is 3,842 square kilometres (1,483 mi^{2}).

The lake has been a popular recreational area since the turn of the 20th century. The lake area is popular for boating, fishing, a wide variety of water activities, cottagers and home owners.

It is located approximately 4.4 kilometres (2.7 mi) south of Glenora and 15.7 kilometres (9.8 mi) west of Pilot Mound, Manitoba. The lake is in the Rural Municipalities of Roblin, and Argyle.

== Rock Lake Dam ==
A concrete stop log dam was built about a mile east of the lake on the Pembina River in 1940. The dam is used to maintain levels a much as possible above 405.08 metres. The dam is ineffective.

== See also ==
- List of lakes of Manitoba
