= Russ McLeod =

Canada-born American football player (1906–1977)

Profile
- Position: Offensive lineman

Personal information
- Born: July 29, 1906; Cypress River, Manitoba
- Died: April 1977
- Listed height: 6 ft 0 in (1.83 m)
- Listed weight: 190 lb (86 kg)

Career information
- High school: Calumet High School; Calumet, Michigan
- College: Saint Louis University

Career history
- St. Louis Gunners (1934)

Career statistics
- Games played: 3
- Games started: 1
- Stats at Pro Football Reference

Russell Ferguson McLeod (July 29, 1906 – April 1977) was an American football lineman. He played 3 games in the National Football League (NFL) for the St. Louis Gunners. He was born in Cypress River, Manitoba, Canada, and played college football at Saint Louis University.
