= Bill Robinson (ice hockey) =

Canadian ice hockey player

- Born: August 31, 1921; Cartwright, Manitoba, Canada
- Died: June 25, 2008 (aged 86)
- Height: 6 ft 0 in (183 cm)
- Weight: 190 lb (86 kg; 13 st 8 lb)
- Position: Forward
- Played for: New York Rovers; Quebec Aces; Seattle Ironmen; Ottawa Senators; Seattle Americans; Harringay Racers
- Playing career: 1941–1957

Bill Robinson (August 31, 1921 – June 25, 2008) was a Canadian ice hockey centreman who played for the 1941 Memorial Cup champion Winnipeg Rangers. He was born in Cartwright, Manitoba.

== Awards and achievements ==
- Turnbull Cup MJHL Championship (1941)
- Memorial Cup Championship (1941)
- Honoured Member of the Manitoba Hockey Hall of Fame
