= Florent Robidoux =

Canadian ice hockey player

- Born: May 5, 1960 (age 66) Cypress River, Manitoba, Canada
- Height: 6 ft 2 in (188 cm)
- Weight: 200 lb (91 kg; 14 st 4 lb)
- Position: Left wing
- Shot: Left
- Played for: Chicago Black Hawks
- NHL draft: Undrafted
- Playing career: 1980–1987

Florent Robidoux (born May 5, 1960) is a Canadian former professional ice hockey player. He played in 52 National Hockey League games with the Chicago Black Hawks between 1980 and 1984. At the time, Florent had played in every IHL, AHL, and NHL arena.

== Career statistics ==
=== Regular season and playoffs ===
| | | | Regular season | | | | | Playoffs |
| Season | Team | League | GP | G | A | Pts | PIM | GP | G | A | Pts | PIM |
|---|---|---|---|---|---|---|---|---|---|---|---|---|
| 1977–78 | Estevan Bruins | SJHL | 59 | 29 | 34 | 63 | 99 | — | — | — | — | — |
| 1977–78 | New Westminster Bruins | WCHL | 8 | 1 | 1 | 2 | 12 | 16 | 1 | 4 | 5 | 35 |
| 1978–79 | Portland Winterhawks | WHL | 70 | 36 | 41 | 77 | 73 | 25 | 11 | 16 | 27 | 20 |
| 1979–80 | Portland Winterhawks | WHL | 70 | 43 | 57 | 100 | 157 | 8 | 5 | 2 | 7 | 10 |
| 1980–81 | Chicago Black Hawks | NHL | 36 | 6 | 2 | 8 | 75 | — | — | — | — | — |
| 1980–81 | New Brunswick Hawks | AHL | 35 | 12 | 11 | 23 | 110 | 13 | 2 | 7 | 9 | 38 |
| 1981–82 | Chicago Black Hawks | NHL | 4 | 1 | 2 | 3 | 0 | — | — | — | — | — |
| 1981–82 | New Brunswick Hawks | AHL | 69 | 31 | 35 | 66 | 200 | 15 | 9 | 10 | 19 | 21 |
| 1983–84 | Chicago Black Hawks | NHL | 9 | 0 | 0 | 0 | 0 | — | — | — | — | — |
| 1983–84 | Springfield Indians | AHL | 68 | 26 | 22 | 48 | 123 | 4 | 0 | 1 | 1 | 6 |
| 1984–85 | Milwaukee Admirals | IHL | 76 | 29 | 35 | 64 | 184 | — | — | — | — | — |
| 1985–86 | Hershey Bears | AHL | 47 | 6 | 3 | 9 | 81 | 3 | 0 | 0 | 0 | 15 |
| 1986–87 | Milwaukee Admirals | IHL | 15 | 2 | 7 | 9 | 16 | 6 | 3 | 3 | 6 | 13 |
| AHL totals | | | 219 | 75 | 71 | 146 | 514 | 35 | 11 | 18 | 29 | 80 |
| NHL totals | | | 52 | 7 | 4 | 11 | 75 | — | — | — | — | — |

== Awards ==
- WHL First All-Star Team – 1980
