= Kaleida, Manitoba =

Kaleida
- Location of Kaleida in Manitoba
- Coordinates: 49°8′45.5″N 99°27′4.5″W
- Country: Canada
- Province: Manitoba
- Region: Pembina Valley
- Census Division: No. 4

Government
  - Governing Body: Municipality of Pembina Council
  - MP: Branden Leslie
  - MLA: Lauren Stone
- Time zone: UTC−6 (CST)
  - Summer (DST): UTC−5 (CDT)
- Area codes: 204, 431
- NTS Map: 062G01
- GNBC Code: GAMLC

Kaleida is an unincorporated community in south central Manitoba, Canada. It is located approximately 28 kilometers (17 miles) southwest of Morden, Manitoba in the Municipality of Pembina. Kaleida has a population of 10 as of June 2021. It is accessible from Provincial Trunk Highway 3 (Boundary Commission Trail) via Provincial Road 528.

== See also ==
- List of regions of Manitoba
- List of rural municipalities in Manitoba
