= Greenway, Manitoba =

Coordinates: 49.365°N 99.116°W

Greenway was a village in south central Manitoba, Canada. It was named after Thomas Greenway, premier of Manitoba from 1888 to 1900. It was built as a result of the Canadian Northern Pacific Railway's Morris Branch being run through the Rural Municipality of Argyle in 1890.

== See also ==
- List of regions of Manitoba
- List of rural municipalities in Manitoba
