= Sarles, North Dakota =

City in North Dakota, United States

- City
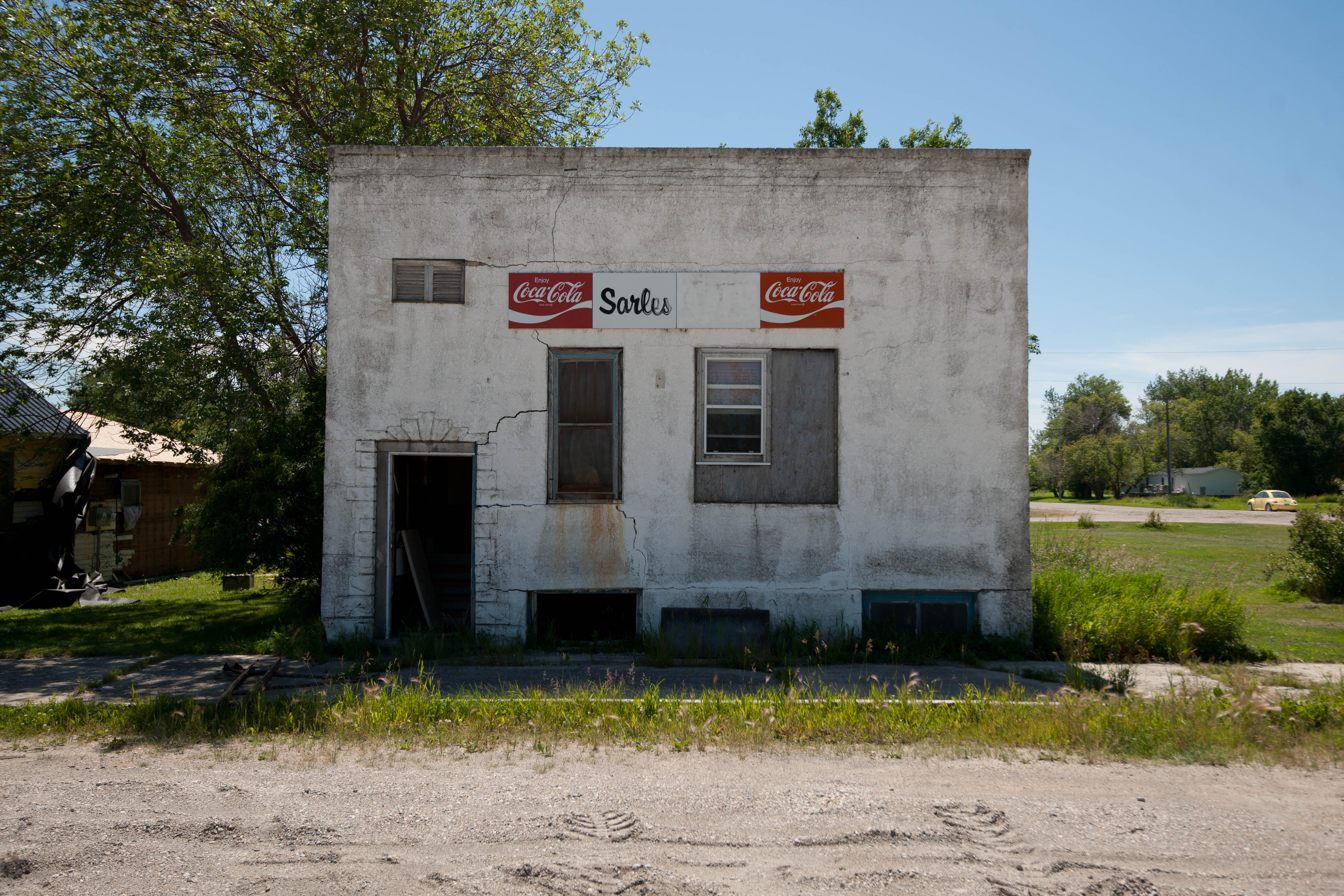
- Building in Sarles

- Location of Sarles, North Dakota
- Coordinates: 48°56′41″N 98°59′49″W
- Country: United States
- State: North Dakota
- Counties: Cavalier, Towner
- Founded: 1905

Area
  - Total: 0.26 sq mi (0.68 km^{2})
  - Land: 0.26 sq mi (0.68 km^{2})
  - Water: 0 sq mi (0.00 km^{2})
- Elevation: 1,585 ft (483 m)

Population (2020)
  - Total: 16
  - Estimate (2022): 15
  - Density: 61.3/sq mi (23.65/km^{2})
- Time zone: UTC-6 (Central (CST))
  - Summer (DST): UTC-5 (CDT)
- ZIP code: 58372
- Area code: 701
- FIPS code: 38-70780
- GNIS feature ID: 1036254

Sarles is a city in Cavalier and Towner counties in the State of North Dakota. The population was 16 at the 2020 census. Sarles was founded in 1905 at the end of the Great Northern railway extension north of Munich, called the "Sarles Branch". The town is named for North Dakota Governor Elmore Y. Sarles.

== Geography ==
According to the United States Census Bureau, the city has a total area of 0.22 square miles (0.57 km^{2}), all land.

== Demographics ==
Historical population
Census	Pop.	Note	%±
1910	346		—
1920	348		0.6%
1930	383		10.1%
1940	302		−21.1%
1950	285		−5.6%
1960	225		−21.1%
1970	148		−34.2%
1980	111		−25.0%
1990	86		−22.5%
2000	25		−70.9%
2010	28		12.0%
2020	16		−42.9%
2022 (est.)	15		−6.2%
U.S. Decennial Census; 2020 Census

=== 2010 census ===
As of the census of 2010, there were 28 people, 13 households, and 5 families residing in the city. The population density was 127.3 inhabitants per square mile (49.2/km^{2}). There were 27 housing units at an average density of 122.7 per square mile (47.4/km^{2}). The racial makeup of the city was 96.4% White and 3.6% Native American.

There were 13 households, of which 30.8% had children under the age of 18 living with them, 30.8% were married couples living together, 7.7% had a male householder with no wife present, and 61.5% were non-families. 53.8% of all households were made up of individuals, and 30.8% had someone living alone who was 65 years of age or older. The average household size was 2.15 and the average family size was 3.80.

The median age in the city was 35.5 years. 35.7% of residents were under the age of 18; 0.0% were between the ages of 18 and 24; 32.1% were from 25 to 44; 14.3% were from 45 to 64; and 17.9% were 65 years of age or older. The gender makeup of the city was 53.6% male and 46.4% female.

=== 2000 census ===
As of the census of 2000, there were 25 people, 16 households, and 5 families residing in the city. The population density was 97.5 inhabitants per square mile (37.6/km^{2}). There were 44 housing units at an average density of 171.5 per square mile (66.2/km^{2}). The racial makeup of the city was 84.00% White and 16.00% Native American.

There were 16 households, out of which 12.5% had children under the age of 18 living with them, 25.0% were married couples living together, 6.3% had a female householder with no husband present, and 68.8% were non-families. 68.8% of all households were made up of individuals, and 43.8% had someone living alone who was 65 years of age or older. The average household size was 1.56 and the average family size was 2.40.

In the city, the population was spread out, with 8.0% under the age of 18, 4.0% from 18 to 24, 24.0% from 25 to 44, 28.0% from 45 to 64, and 36.0% who were 65 years of age or older. The median age was 56 years. For every 100 females, there were 127.3 males. For every 100 females age 18 and over, there were 130.0 males.

The median income for a household in the city was $31,875, and the median income for a family was $36,875. Males had a median income of $31,250 versus $0 for females. The per capita income for the city was $21,479. There were no families and 8.3% of the population living below the poverty line, including no under eighteens and none of those over 64.
