= Rural Municipality of Victoria =

Rural municipality in Manitoba, Canada

- Rural municipality
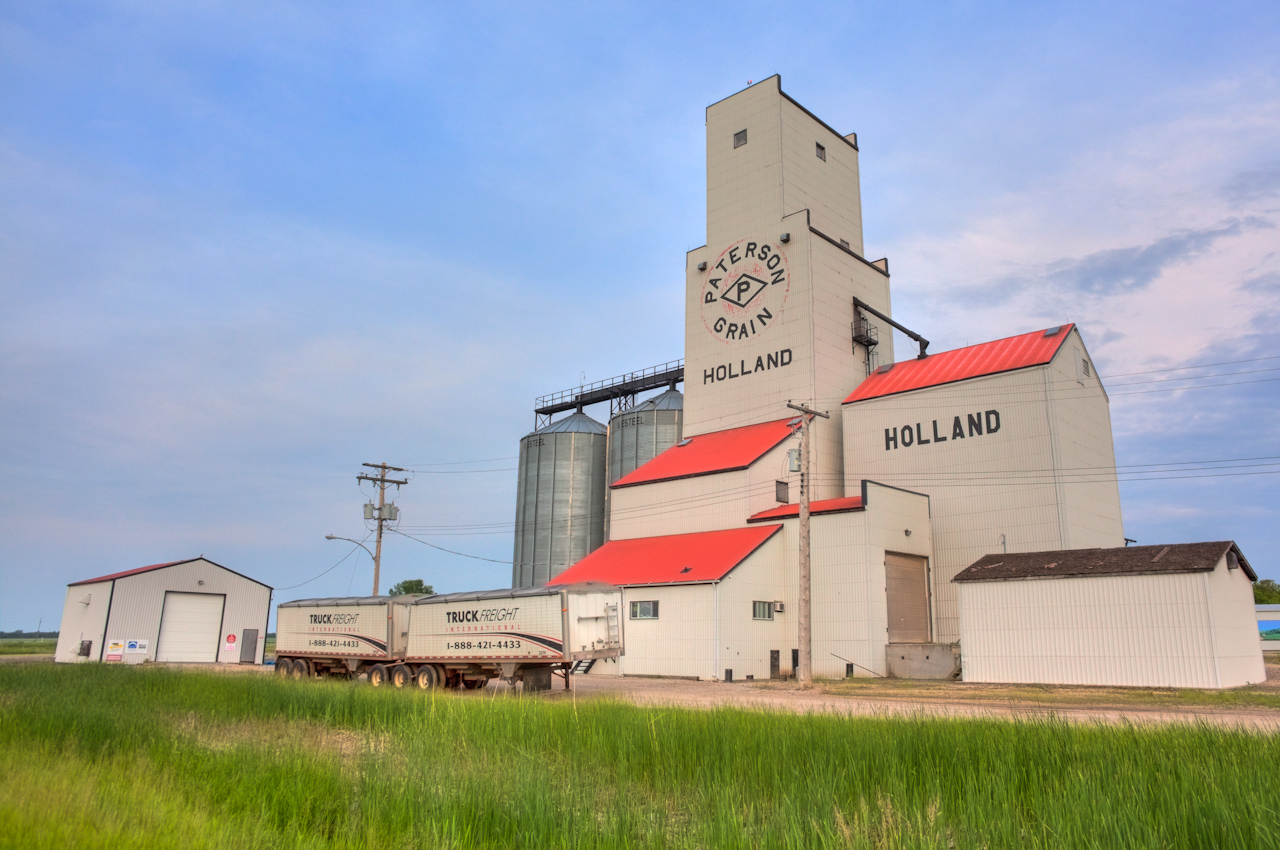
- Grain elevator at Holland

- Location of the RM of Victoria in Manitoba
- Coordinates: 49°39′52″N 98°54′55″W
- Country: Canada
- Province: Manitoba
- Region: Central Plains

Area
  - Land: 703.54 km^{2} (271.64 sq mi)

Population (2021)
  - Total: 1,188
- Time zone: UTC-6 (CST)
  - Summer (DST): UTC-5 (CDT)
- Area codes: 204 and 431
- Website: rmofvictoria.com

The Rural Municipality of Victoria is a rural municipality (RM) located in south-central Manitoba, north-east of Glenboro. The RM was established in 1902 and named for Queen Victoria. In its westernmost part, the RM contains parts of Manitoba's Spruce Woods Provincial Forest and Spruce Woods Provincial Park.

== Communities ==
- Cypress River
- Holland
- Landseer

== Demographics ==
In the 2021 Census of Population conducted by Statistics Canada, Victoria had a population of 1,188 living in 464 of its 518 total private dwellings, a change of 4.9% from its 2016 population of 1,132. With a land area of 703.54 km^{2} (271.64 sq mi), it had a population density of 1.7/km^{2} (4.4/sq mi) in 2021.

== See also ==
- List of francophone communities in Manitoba
- Monarchy in Manitoba
- Royal eponyms in Canada
