= Cartwright-Roblin Municipality =

Rural municipality in Manitoba, Canada

Cartwright–Roblin
- Rural municipality
- Cartwright–Roblin Municipality
- Location of Cartwright–Roblin in Manitoba
- Coordinates: 49.0955°N 99.3398°W
- Country: Canada
- Province: Manitoba
- Region: Pembina Valley
- Incorporated (amalgamated): January 1, 2015

Area
  - Total: 716.75 km^{2} (276.74 sq mi)

Population (2021)
  - Total: 1,336
  - Density: 1.864/km^{2} (4.828/sq mi)
- Time zone: UTC-6 (CST)
  - Summer (DST): UTC-5 (CDT)
- Website: cartwrightroblin.com

Cartwright–Roblin Municipality is a rural municipality in the Canadian province of Manitoba.

== History ==
The municipality was created on January 1, 2015 via the amalgamation of the RM of Roblin (2011 population 932) and the Village of Cartwright (2011 population 308). It was formed as a requirement of The Municipal Amalgamations Act, which required that municipalities with a population less than 1,000 amalgamate with one or more neighbouring municipalities by 2015. The Government of Manitoba initiated these amalgamations in order for municipalities to meet the 1997 minimum population requirement of 1,000 to incorporate a municipality.

The former Rural Municipality of Roblin in the Canadian province of Manitoba was originally incorporated as a rural municipality on November 15, 1902. It ceased on January 1, 2015 as a result of its provincially mandated amalgamation with the Village of Cartwright to form Cartwright – Roblin Municipality.

== Geography ==
According to Statistics Canada, the former RM had an area of 716.15km^{2} (276.51 sq mi).

Cartwright-Roblin Municipality is located in the Pembina Valley Region of the province along the border of the state of North Dakota in the United States of America. According to the Canada 2021 Census, the municipality had a population of 1336.

=== Communities ===
- Cartwright
- Mather

=== Adjacent municipalities ===
- Municipality of Killarney-Turtle Mountain - (west)
- Rural Municipality of Prairie Lakes - (northwest)
- Rural Municipality of Argyle - (north)
- Municipality of Louise - (east)
- Towner County, North Dakota - (south)

== Demographics ==
In the 2021 Census of Population conducted by Statistics Canada, Cartwright-Roblin had a population of 1,336 living in 396 of its 489 total private dwellings, a change of 2.1% from its 2016 population of 1,308. With a land area of 705.27 km^{2} (272.31 sq mi), it had a population density of 1.9/km^{2} (4.9/sq mi) in 2021.

== Attractions ==
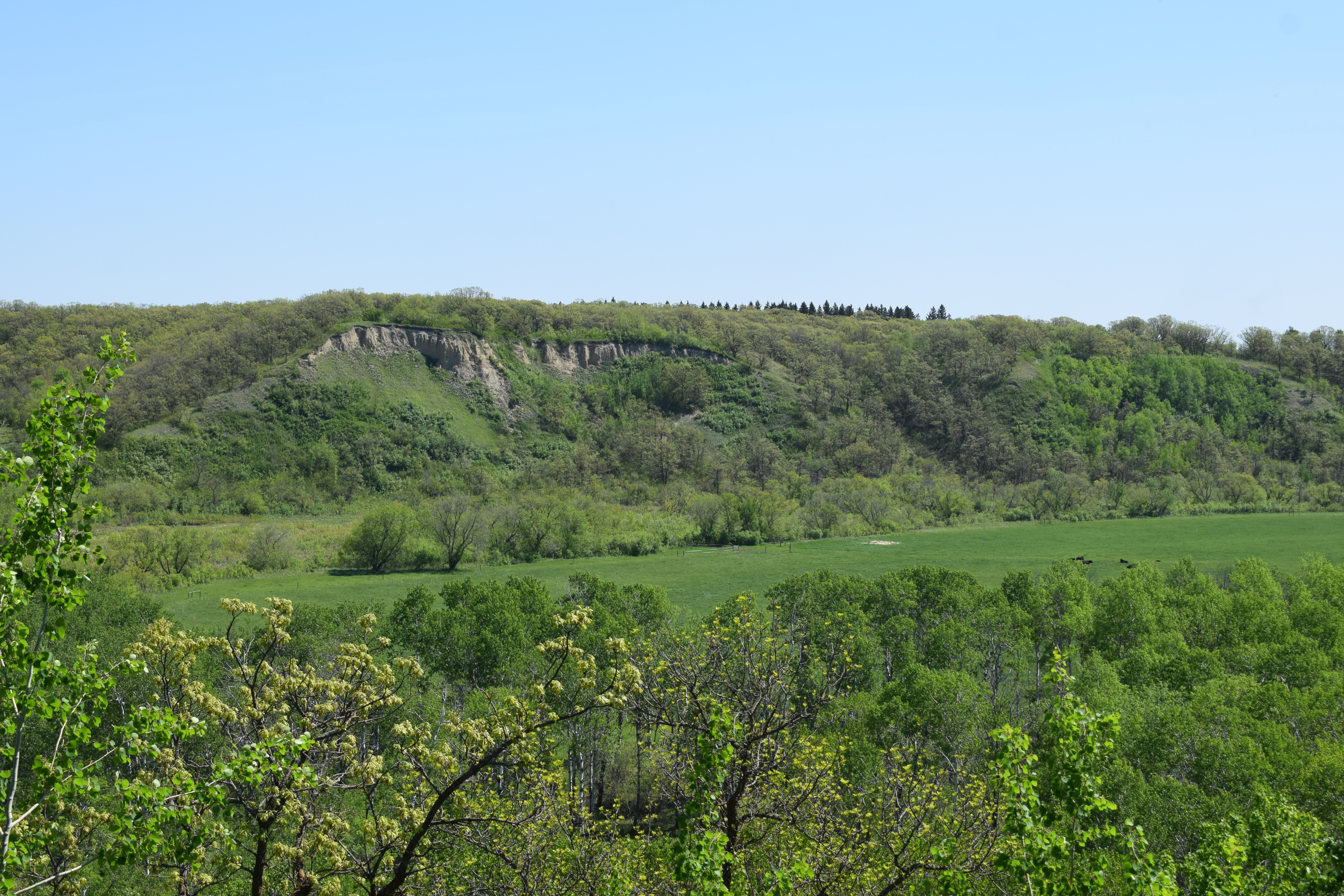
Clay Banks Bison Jump north of Cartwright, a Manitoba Historical site.

- The Clay Banks (buffalo jump), a site about 2,500 years old, used by Sonata and Besant First Nations as a hunting tool. Hunters would stampede American bison over these cliffs, later carving up the animal carcasses below for use as food, tools, and clothing.
- Badger Creek Crossing Cairn, marking the original site of Old Cartwright.
- Cartwright Town & Country Golf Club, a 9-hole golf course.
- Badger Creek Park, picnic and beach areas.
- Reflection Park gardens.
- Rock Lake Beach, Manitoba and public boat launch, approximately 18 km north of Cartwright, features lots for cabins, fishing, boating and other water recreation.
- Rock Lake Nature & Hiking Trail, immediately south of Rock Lake Beach.
- East End Rock Lake public boat launch.
- Heritage Park Museums and Campground, a collection of historic buildings including a main museum, shoe repair shop, post office, Manitoba Telephone System building, a single-room school house and a heritage house. Each building contains a collection of artifacts relating to the building's former use.
- Blacksmith Museum, a fully restored and working blacksmith's shop. Open summers afternoons: Wednesdays, Saturdays, Sundays, holiday Mondays and otherwise upon request.
- Church of England, a fully restored and working stone church.
- The Wall, Mather Manitoba.
- Hansboro–Cartwright Border Crossing

== See also ==
- Municipality of Roblin
