= Holland, Manitoba =

Community in Manitoba, Canada

Holland
- City
- Village of Holland
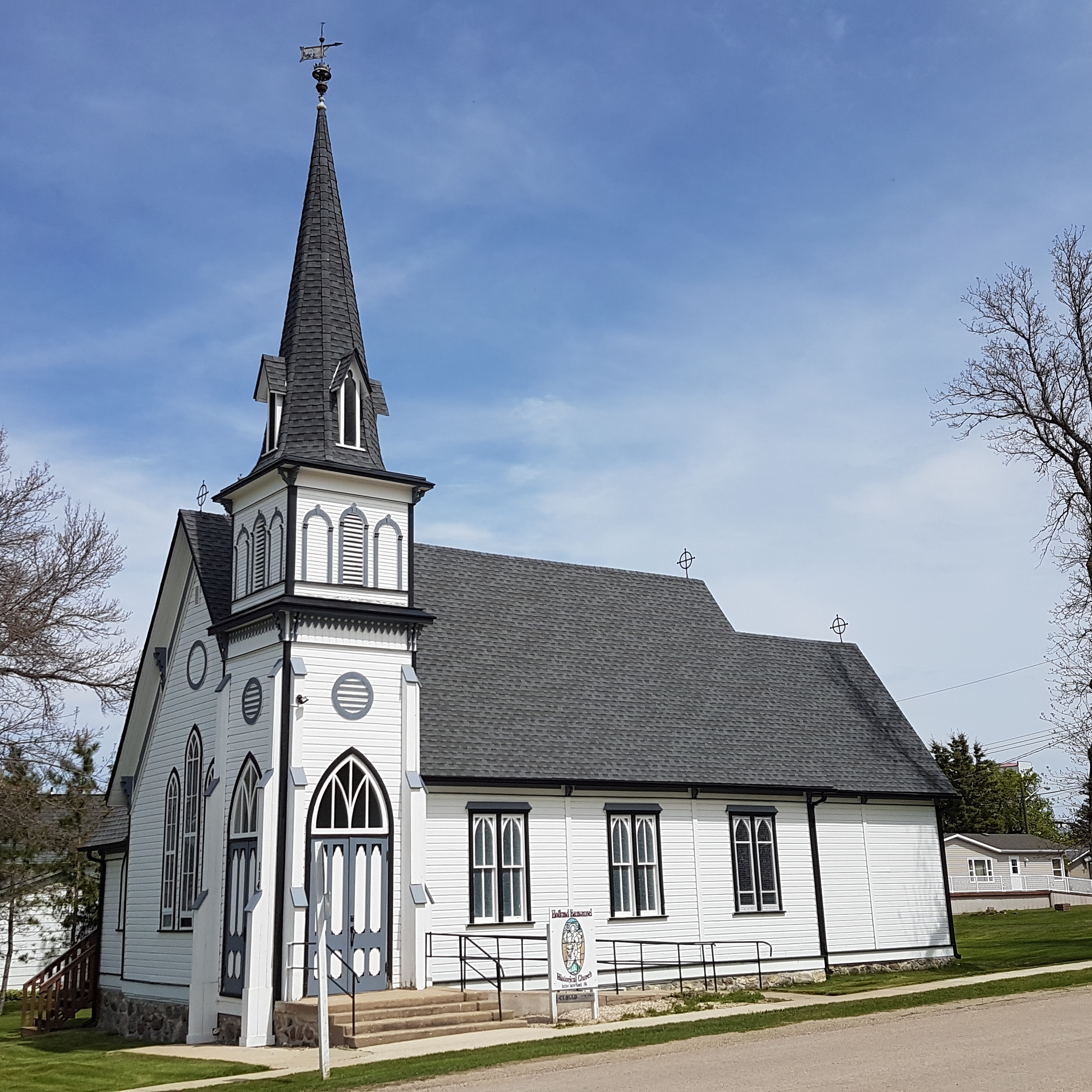
- Emmanuel Anglican Church.

- Location of Holland in Manitoba
- Coordinates: 49°35′40″N 98°52′52″W
- Country: Canada
- Province: Manitoba
- Rural Municipality: Victoria
- Established: 1878

Government
  - MP (Portage—Lisgar): Branden Leslie
  - MLA (Spruce Woods): Vacant

Area
  - Total: 2.70 km^{2} (1.04 sq mi)
- Elevation: 380 m (1,250 ft)

Population (2021)
  - Total: 353
  - Density: 131/km^{2} (339/sq mi)
- Time zone: UTC-6 (CST)
  - Summer (DST): UTC-5 (CDT)
- Postal code span: Rxx
- Area code: 204
- Demonym: Hollander

Holland, Manitoba is an unincorporated community recognized as a local urban district in the Rural Municipality of Victoria, in Manitoba.

It is located at the junction of Highway 2 and Highway 34.

The town was founded along what is formerly the Canadian Pacific Railway Glenboro Subdivision right-of-way. The railway tracks were damaged by spring flooding in 2011 and the line was taken out of service from Rathwell to Nesbitt. The railway tracks were removed in 2015 by Cando Contracting after the line was sold for salvage after attempts to start a short line railway fell short. Two Assiniboine Community College students proposed a hypothetical business plan to purchase, repair and operate the rail line which was the 2015 winner of the Manitoba New Venture Championships, although this plan never came to completion.

It lies south of the Assiniboine River, at an elevation of 380 metres (1,250 ft). Spruce Woods Provincial Park is located north-west of the community.

Community facilities include an elementary School, public library, volunteer Fire Department, supermarket, convenience store, hardware, post office, and a medical clinic. A skating arena and curling rink are open during the winter months only. A farm machinery dealership lies opposite the town across Highway 2.

Residents of Holland are known as "Hollanders". Holland is the administrative centre of the surrounding municipality of Victoria and home to the LaSalle Redboine Conservation District and the Tiger Hills Arts Association.

== Demographics ==
In the 2021 Census of Population conducted by Statistics Canada, Holland had a population of 354 living in 168 of its 190 total private dwellings, a change of 0% from its 2016 population of 354. With a land area of 2.7 km^{2} (1.0 sq mi), it had a population density of 131.1/km^{2} (339.6/sq mi) in 2021.

== Our Lady of the Prairies Monastery ==
Our Lady of the Prairies is a French Trappist monastery located near Rd 61 West and built from 1892 to 1918. It was designed by academic architect Jacques Collin, with assistance of Smith Carter Partners. The facility was known for its Oka cheese that was produced by monk Brother Albéric for 60+ years until 2018 when he retired. The monastery resides on 324 hectares of land, which includes the building itself, the farm that produces the cheese, and a small house where nuns and monks live.

In the following years, the surrounding farm land, the monastery site and its buildings were sold to Saint Mark’s Coptic Orthodox congregation located in Chevrier Boulevard in Winnipeg. In the fall of 2021, remains in the facility's cemetery were disinterred and moved to a cemetery in Rue des Ruines du Monastère.

As of July 2024, the monastery is now permanently closed, with members of the church's Sunday school visiting every few months ranging from grades 4-12. The owner of the congregation has changed the name to "St. Mary's Coptic Orthodox Monastery & Retreat Centre". All of the monks have left for good.

== Notable people ==
- Glen Harmon, NHL all-star
- Ken Leishman, criminal known for robberies between 1957 and 1966
