= Cypress River, Manitoba =

Community in Manitoba, Canada

Coordinates: 49°33′22″N 99°27′12″W

Location of Cypress River in Manitoba

Cypress River is an unincorporated community recognized as a local urban district in the Rural Municipality of Victoria in the Canadian province of Manitoba. Originally, the community was known as "Littleton". On Neil Young's 2005 album Prairie Wind, he makes references to Cypress River in the title track.

It is described as “the best ‘Little Town’ on the Prairie” ! which is a play on the name of Robert & Nathaniel Little, the original circa-1880s founders. Littleton, now marked only with a cairn and plaque, was located 2 miles east and 1 mile north of the present site. Cypress River has a population of 175 within the town limits. The area provides a beautiful diversity of landscapes – rock-strewn hills, wetlands, forested sandy lands, and flat prairie fields. Unlike some communities “in the middle of nowhere”, Cypress River is actually “on the edge of everywhere”; a half-mile from the corner of four municipalities.

From its beginnings in the 1880s, Cypress River has always been ready to welcome visitors. The Prairie Wind Music Festival occurs in June, Agricultural Fair in July, and other events throughout the year. Camping facilities are available year round and include electrical hookup and a dump station. The Trans-Canada Trail leads into town and is navigable by foot, bicycle, or horse. Two churches serve the community, as well as businesses providing a variety of services.

The Cypress River and Area Foundation was established in 2004.

1. On April 27, 1885, the S.S.Alpha, a steamboat which hauled freight and passengers out of Winnipeg along the Red-Assiniboine river system, set sail from Winnipeg with a cargo of freight for Portage la Prairie and Brandon. The Assiniboine River was high with spring runoff and the captain decided to cut across some of the river’s many bends. She hit a sandbar, 11 miles north of Littleton (between Cypress River and Holland). Abandoned to the river, Alpha gradually deteriorated and her resting place was concealed and forgotten. In the 1930s, a change in the river’s course carved away debris, and when the water level is low, her remains can still be seen.
2. Built in the late 1880s, the Union Hotel at Cypress River was advertised as the “best Temperance Hotel in the west”. Since 1922, the building has served as a grocery store; currently the store is known as Cypress River Foods.
3. Prior to 1877, the political boundary of the border of the Province of Manitoba and the Northwest Territories was formed along an imaginary line 8 miles west of Gladstone and 1 mile east of Cypress River.
4. Robert Little wrote a book about his experiences around Cypress River, title Reminiscences.

== Geography ==
It is located along Highway 2 in south central Manitoba between Tiger Hills to the south, and the sandy hills of Spruce Woods Provincial Park to the north.

=== Climate ===
Climate data for Cypress River
| Month | Jan | Feb | Mar | Apr | May | Jun | Jul | Aug | Sep | Oct | Nov | Dec | Year |
|---|---|---|---|---|---|---|---|---|---|---|---|---|---|
| Record high °C (°F) | 7.2 (45.0) | 12 (54) | 19.4 (66.9) | 37 (99) | 38 (100) | 40.6 (105.1) | 42.2 (108.0) | 39.4 (102.9) | 37.2 (99.0) | 33 (91) | 23.3 (73.9) | 13.3 (55.9) | 42.2 (108.0) |
| Mean daily maximum °C (°F) | −11.6 (11.1) | −7.3 (18.9) | −0.4 (31.3) | 10.6 (51.1) | 19.2 (66.6) | 23.4 (74.1) | 25.8 (78.4) | 25.3 (77.5) | 18.9 (66.0) | 11.2 (52.2) | −0.5 (31.1) | −8.9 (16.0) | 8.8 (47.8) |
| Daily mean °C (°F) | −16.9 (1.6) | −12.6 (9.3) | −5.6 (21.9) | 4.3 (39.7) | 12.2 (54.0) | 17 (63) | 19.2 (66.6) | 18.3 (64.9) | 12.4 (54.3) | 5.5 (41.9) | −5 (23) | −13.8 (7.2) | 2.9 (37.2) |
| Mean daily minimum °C (°F) | −22.1 (−7.8) | −17.8 (0.0) | −10.7 (12.7) | −2.1 (28.2) | 5.2 (41.4) | 10.5 (50.9) | 12.6 (54.7) | 11.3 (52.3) | 6 (43) | −0.2 (31.6) | −9.4 (15.1) | −18.7 (−1.7) | −3 (27) |
| Record low °C (°F) | −43.9 (−47.0) | −43.5 (−46.3) | −38.9 (−38.0) | −30 (−22) | −12.2 (10.0) | −3.3 (26.1) | −1.1 (30.0) | −3.9 (25.0) | −10.6 (12.9) | −21.5 (−6.7) | −36.7 (−34.1) | −39.5 (−39.1) | −43.9 (−47.0) |
| Average precipitation mm (inches) | 22.7 (0.89) | 19.3 (0.76) | 21.5 (0.85) | 32.3 (1.27) | 61.5 (2.42) | 90.7 (3.57) | 83.3 (3.28) | 70 (2.8) | 49.5 (1.95) | 37.8 (1.49) | 24.7 (0.97) | 24.1 (0.95) | 537.2 (21.15) |
Source: Environment Canada

== Notable people ==
- Carson Carels, hockey player
- Russ McLeod, NFL player
- Ric Nordman, politician
- Florent Robidoux, former professional hockey player
- Scott Young, journalist, father of musician Neil Young.

== See also ==
- List of communities in Manitoba
