= Mather, Manitoba =

Mather
- Location of Mather in Manitoba
- Coordinates: 49°05′56″N 99°11′28″W
- Country: Canada
- Province: Manitoba
- Region: Pembina Valley
- Census Division: No. 4

Government
  - Governing Body: Cartwright-Roblin Municipality Council
  - MP: Grant Jackson
  - MLA: Colleen Robbins
- Time zone: UTC−6 (CST)
  - Summer (DST): UTC−5 (CDT)
- Area code: 204
- GNBC Code: GBACH

Mather (49°05′56″N 99°11′28″W, CST) is an unincorporated community recognized as a local urban district in southwest Manitoba, Canada, and part of Cartwright – Roblin Municipality. It is located just off of PTH 3 (Boundary Commission Trail) along PR 442. The Mather area is known as Crocus Country.

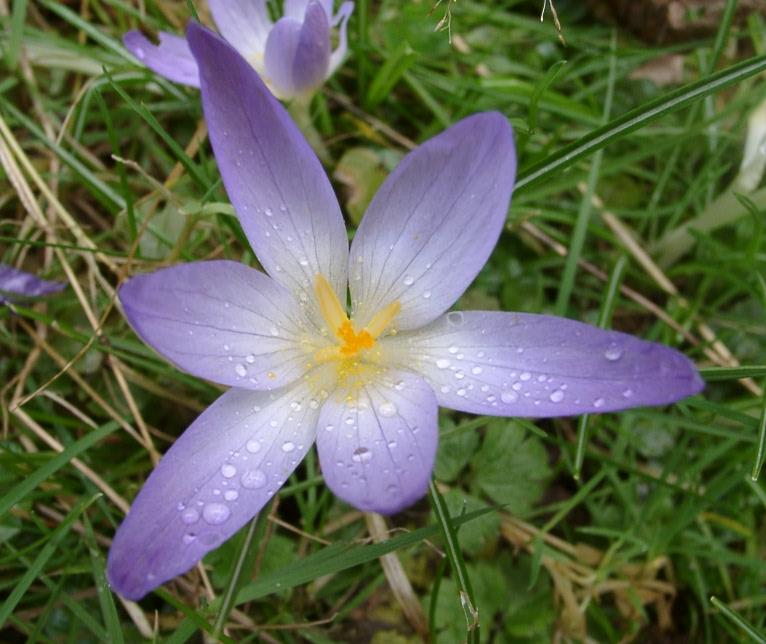
Crocus

== Businesses ==
The area around Mather is primarily a farming community. Mather also has a Harms Seeds, Yake's Service, as well as a barbershop.

Mixed farming is most common in the Mather area. Commonly harvested yields consist of wheat, barley, oats, canola, corn, soybeans and flax, as well as some sunflower and pea crops.

== Attractions ==
The Rock and Memorial Wall

"The Rock’" was moved by road on a metal skid to the centre of Mather as a commemorative marker. It was balanced on the skid with railway ties and due to the friction of the road and skid, enough heat was created to start the railway ties on fire. It is located next to the "Memorial Wall" which commemorates the 100th anniversary of the settlement of Mather. The brick wall displays over 550 family names of past and present residents.

The Grove

"The Grove" is a privately owned garden with winding paths, a small chapel, a fountain, a playhouse, and a summer house. The Grove has become a local hot spot for summer weddings.

Rock Lake

Mather is just south of Rock Lake where many water related activities take place in summer.

Boundary Commission Trail

Mather is located along the Boundary Commission Trail.

== Notable people ==
- Terry Yake - Hockey player

== See also ==
- List of regions of Manitoba
- List of rural municipalities in Manitoba
