= Neelin =

Rural Community

- Location of Neelin in Manitoba
- Coordinates: 49°13′45″N 99°21′03″W
- Country: Canada
- Province: Manitoba
- Region: Pembina Valley
- Census Division: No. 4

Government
  - Governing Body: RM of Roblin, Prairie Lakes, Argyle
  - MP: Grant Jackson
  - MLA: Colleen Robbins
- Elevation: 436 m (1,430 ft)
- Area code: 204
- GNBC Code: GBACH

Neelin is a small community in the Canadian province of Manitoba. It is located on Manitoba Provincial Highway 5 in the Rural Municipality of Argyle, about 29 km east of Killarney, or about 200 km southwest of Winnipeg.

The Roseberry school district was established in 1885, leading to the construction of a one-room schoolhouse in 1904. The school served as a K–12 school until 1960, when high school students began to bus to either Baldur, Killarney or Cartwright. Roseberry, now known as Neelin school, continued until 1968, when it was closed. The building has since been demolished. The Neelin Cemetery, established in 1917, is considered to be a historical site.

Neelin was also home to a Manitoba Pool elevator. The elevator stood on the CPR railroad tracks until its closure in 1978.

== See also ==
- List of regions of Manitoba
- List of rural municipalities in Manitoba
