= Rural Municipality of Argyle =

Rural municipality in Manitoba, Canada

Argyle
- Rural municipality
- Rural Municipality of Argyle
- Location of Argyle in Manitoba
- Coordinates: 49°22′11″N 99°09′2″W
- Country: Canada
- Province: Manitoba
- Provincial riding: Turtle Mountain
- Region: Pembina Valley
- Incorporated: August 15, 1881
- Named for: John Campbell, 9th Duke of Argyll

Area
  - Total: 770.44 km^{2} (297.47 sq mi)

Population (2016)
  - Total: 1,025
- Time zone: UTC-6 (CST)
  - Summer (DST): UTC-5 (CDT)
- Website: www.rmofargyle.ca

The Rural Municipality of Argyle is a rural municipality in southwestern Manitoba, Canada. Incorporated on 15 August 1881, it is named after John Campbell, 9th Duke of Argyll who was the fourth Governor General of Canada.

Baldur is the largest community in the municipality, which sits between Brandon and Portage la Prairie. Part of Rock Lake can also be found in the municipality.

Argyle is also home to the oldest standing Icelandic Lutheran Church in Canada, built in 1889.

== Communities ==
- Baldur
- Glenora
- Greenway
- Neelin

== History ==
In August 1880, two men from the New Iceland region of Manitoba, Sigurdur Kristofersson (or Chistopherson) and Kristjan Jonsson, set out westward to see their friend who had settled in Pilot Mound. On their way, Kristofersson and Jonsson came across an area of rolling prairie grass with small lakes which had no settlers besides two men who lived in a tent.

Kristofersson filed entry for the first homestead in what would later become the RM of Argyle. He named his farm Grund, Icelandic for 'grassy plain'. Kristofersson was soon joined by several other families, and made several trips back to Iceland, encouraging many fellow Icelanders to immigrate to his new homeland.

The rural municipality was incorporated on 15 August 1881 and is named after John Campbell, 9th Duke of Argyll, who was the fourth Governor General of Canada.

On July 26, 1885, a new congregation named Frelsis ('Liberty') was formed. In 1889, the congregation erected its Lutheran Church at Grund.

Also in 1889, in response to the Northern Pacific and Manitoba Railway's proposal of a line that would pass through the centre of Argyle to link Morris with Brandon, the towns of Greenway and Belmont were established. However, this left a large stretch of land without service.

With significant demand for a station to be located between Greenway and Belmont, the town of Baldur was established in 1890.

On March 16, 1906, a portion of Argyle was divided into the Rural Municipality of Strathcona, later forming the RM of Prairie Lakes.

Between 1964 and 1965, the Frelsis congregation joined Baldur Immanuel Lutheran Church. With the Frelsis building being the oldest-standing Icelandic Lutheran Church in Canada by this time, community members requested the provincial government to designate the church as a historic site. The government followed through on September 15, 1974.

== Demographics ==
In the 2021 Census of Population conducted by Statistics Canada, Argyle had a population of 994 living in 398 of its 515 total private dwellings, a change of −3% from its 2016 population of 1,025. With a land area of 768.63 km^{2} (296.77 sq mi), it had a population density of 1.3/km^{2} (3.3/sq mi) in 2021.

== Notable people ==
- Chris Fridfinnson — ice hockey player, born in Baldur
- Hallgrímur Fr. Hallgrímsson — Icelandic businessman, who went to high school in Baldur.
- Tom Johnson — Hockey Hall of Famer, born in Baldur
- Bill Stilwell — award-winning author and naturalist, born in Baldur

=== Politicians ===
- Walter Clark — politician and farmer, raised and lived in Baldur
- Irving Cleghorn — Scottish-Canadian politician who operated a pharmacy in Baldur prior to taking office
- Donald Craik — provincial cabinet minister, born in Baldur and raised in Greenway
- Ivan Schultz — provincial cabinet minister, born in Baldur
- John A. Mabon — a farmer from Neelin, who served as Reeve of Argyle in 1952 and later unsuccessfully ran as an independent candidate for Mountain in 1953.

== See also ==
- List of francophone communities in Manitoba
