= Pembina River (Manitoba – North Dakota) =

Pembina River Rivière Pembina
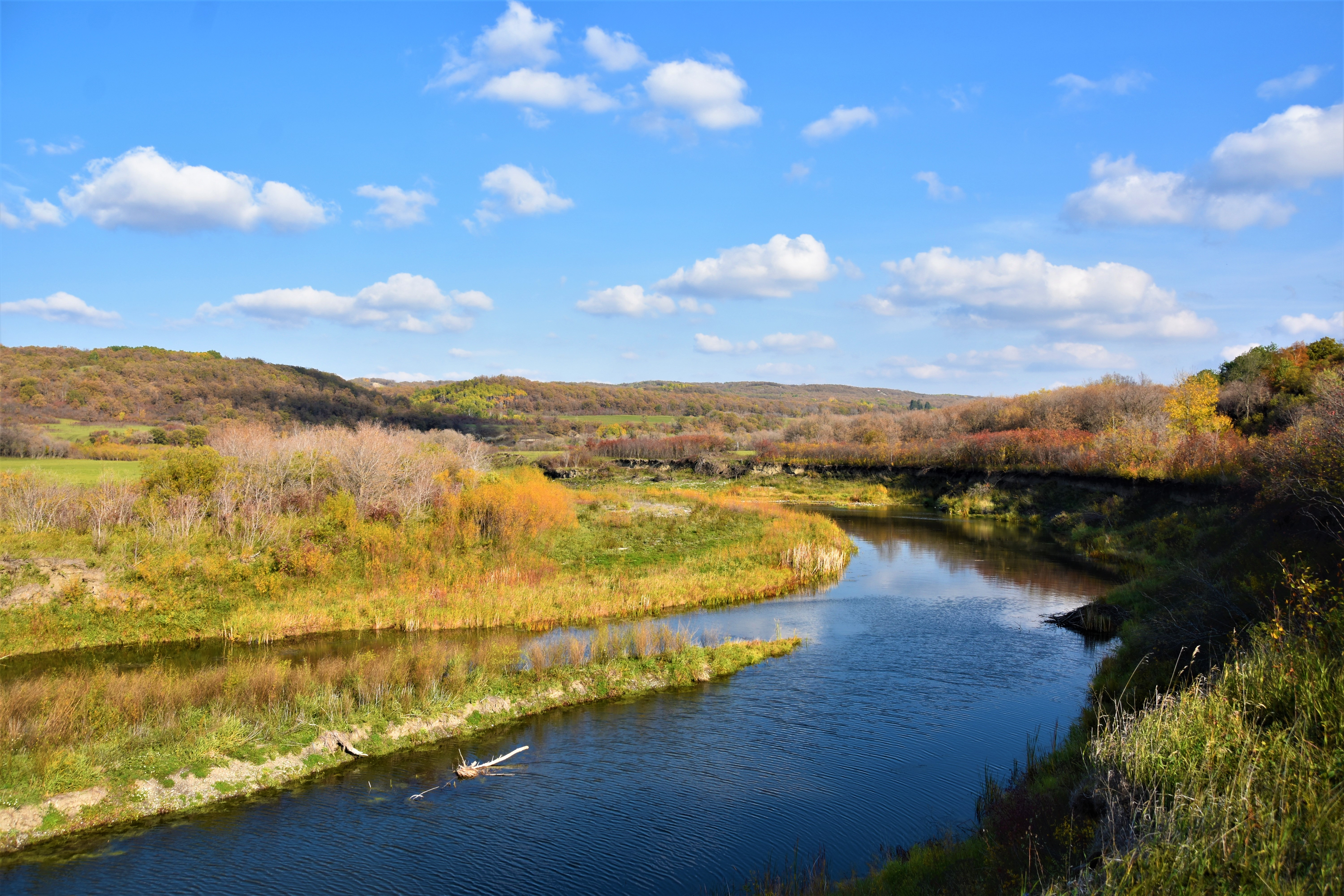
- The Pembina River in Pembina Valley Provincial Park

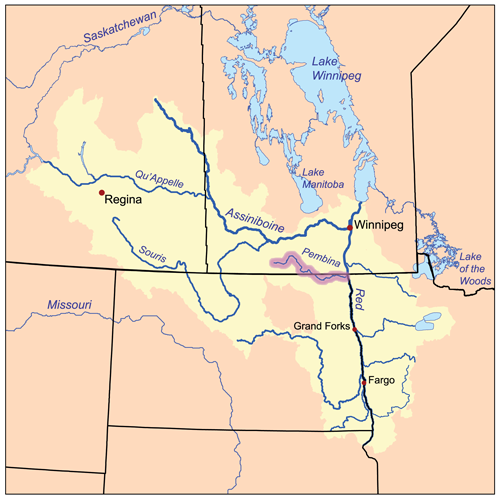
- The Red River drainage basin, with the Pembina River highlighted

Location
- Countries: Canada, United States
- States/Provinces: Manitoba, North Dakota

Physical characteristics
- Source: Turtle Mountain (plateau)
  - location: Manitoba, Canada
  - coordinates: 49°05′06″N 100°03′05″W (near Turtle Mountain)
- Mouth: Red River of the North
  - location: Pembina, North Dakota, United States
  - coordinates: 48°57′59″N 97°14′21″W
- Length: 319 mi (513 km)
- Basin size: 3,282 sq mi (8,500 km^{2})

Basin features
- River system: Red River drainage basin

The Pembina River is a tributary of the Red River of the North, approximately 319 miles (513 km) long, in southern Manitoba in Canada and northeastern North Dakota in the United States. It drains an area (about 8500 square kilometers) of the prairie country along the Canada–US border, threading the Manitoba-North Dakota border eastward to the Red River. Via the Red River, Lake Winnipeg and the Nelson River, it is part of the watershed of Hudson Bay.

It rises in several streams on the eastern side of the Turtle Mountains on both sides of the international border. The streams converge near Neelin, Manitoba and flow initially northeast, then southeast along the west side of the Pembina Hills into Cavalier County in northeastern North Dakota. It flows east, just south of the border, past Walhalla and Neche. It joins the Red River from the west just south of Pembina, approximately 2 miles (3 km) south of the international border. It receives the Tongue River from the south approximately 2 miles (3 km) upstream from its mouth on the Red.

The main tributaries of the Pembina River are Badger Creek and Long River. Some of the numerous minor tributaries include the Mary Jane, Pilot, Crystal, and Snowflake Creeks. The Pembina River ranges in depth from 1.5 to 4 metres (4.9 to 13.1 ft) at mid-channel. The full width of the river is highly variable, ranging from 6 metres (20 ft) to as much as 40 metres (130 ft) in other areas. There are numerous wetlands and prairie potholes in this watershed.

The elevation of the watershed ranges from 721 metres (2,365 ft) above sea level in the southwestern corner of the watershed, down to 330 metres (1,080 ft) adjacent to the Pembina River in the southeastern corner of the watershed. The watershed is level through the central and eastern regions, however the elevation rises roughly 200 metres (660 ft) in the 25-kilometre (16 mi) radius around the Turtle Mountain Provincial Park.

Water flow rates in the Pembina River watershed are highly variable. Data from hydrometric stations are used to monitor river flow rates and lake levels, for flood forecasting, and water management investigations. Water levels typically peak during spring run-off and rapidly declines generally in a few days. Groundwater contribution to stream flow normally ensures the river runs throughout the year. The months of March, April and May account for 68 percent of the run-off in a given year. Annual spring run-off rates are highly variable. In Neche, ND the lowest annual volume recorded was 356-m (2870 acre-ft) in 1939. The highest recorded volume was 94,400 hectare-m (765,000 acre-ft) in 1997.

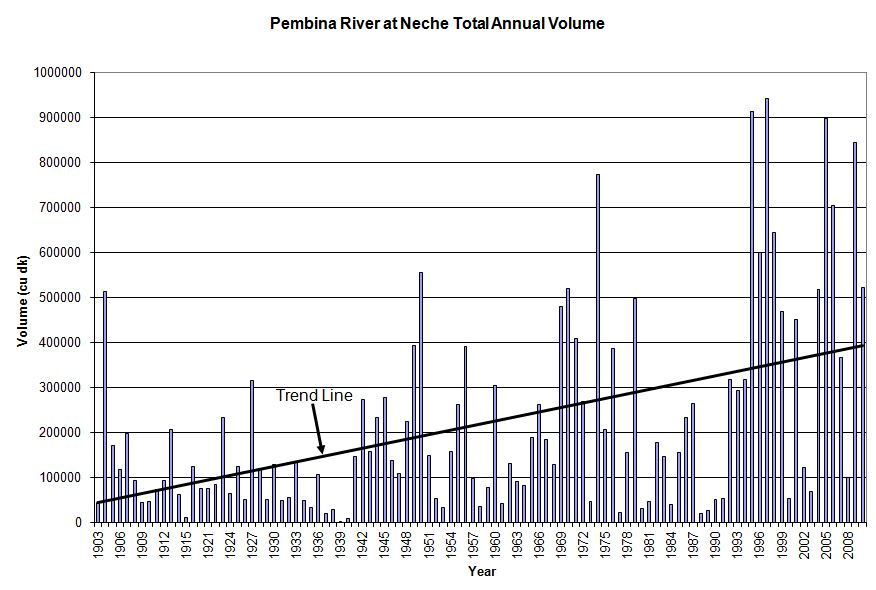
flow volumes for Pembina River at Neche

Environment Canada has a water quality monitoring station is maintained at the south-east corner of the watershed, near the International Boundary. Information from this station is collected regularly and is used to analyze for numerous variables including pesticides, metals, nutrients, general chemistry, and bacteria. A study conducted in 2001 found that over a 25-year period (1974–99) phosphorus concentrations had increased by 52 percent in the Pembina river. This increase in phosphorus is likely a result of increased nutrient input from a combination of wastewater treatment, agricultural inputs, and atmospheric depositions. Elevated phosphorus concentrations promote excessive algal bloom growth, which have many undesirable outcomes for the watershed and the entire Lake Winnipeg basin.

== See also ==
- List of Manitoba rivers
- List of North Dakota rivers
- Pembina Valley Provincial Park
- Pembina Gorge State Park
