= Clearwater, Manitoba =

Clearwater
- Location of Clearwater in Manitoba
- Coordinates: 49°08′01″N 99°02′07″W
- Country: Canada
- Province: Manitoba
- Time zone: UTC-6 (CST)
  - Summer (DST): UTC-5 (CDT)

Clearwater is an unincorporated community recognized as a local urban district in south central Manitoba, Canada. It is located in the Municipality of Louise. It plays host to the Harvest Moon Festival, a music and organic farming event held each September. Clearwater is also the site of an annual July 1 Canada Day baseball tournament.

== Transportation ==
The community has access to other towns in Manitoba via MB Provincial Highways 3A and 342. The community has access to Winnipeg via Highways 3A and 3.

== Notable people ==
- Mary Riter Hamilton, painter who was raised in Clearwater

== See also ==
- List of regions of Manitoba
- List of rural municipalities in Manitoba
