= Crystal City, Manitoba =

Crystal City
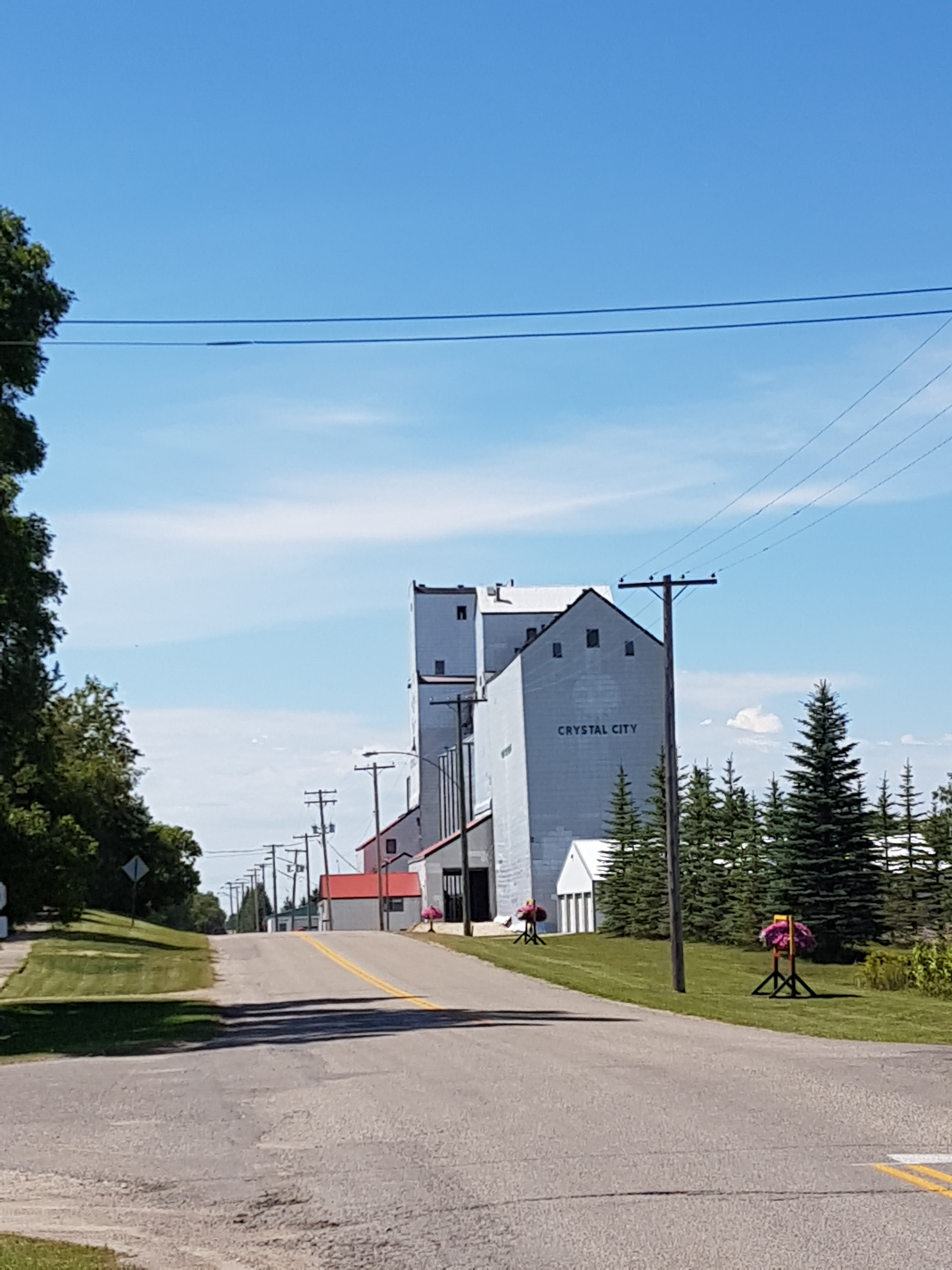
- Elevators in Crystal City.

- Location of Crystal City in Manitoba
- Coordinates: 49°08′47″N 98°56′56″W
- Country: Canada
- Province: Manitoba
- Region: Westman
- Rural Municipality: Rural Municipality of Louise
- Established: 1947

Government
  - MP (Brandon-Souris): Grant Jackson (CPC)
  - MLA (Turtle Mountain): Doyle Piwniuk (PC)

Area
  - Total: 2.80 km^{2} (1.08 sq mi)
- Elevation: 465 m (1,526 ft)

Population (2016)
  - Total: 389
  - Density: 138.9/km^{2} (360/sq mi)
  - Change 2006-11: 1.3%
- Time zone: UTC-6 (CST)
  - Summer (DST): UTC-5 (CDT)
- Postal code span: R0K
- Area code: 204

Crystal City is an unincorporated community recognized as a local urban district in the Municipality of Louise within the Canadian province of Manitoba. It held village status prior to January 1, 2015. It is located on Highway 3, 16 kilometres north of the Canada–United States border and 200 kilometres southwest of Winnipeg.

In summer 1878, Thomas Greenway, who would later serve in the Manitoba Legislature and become Premier of Manitoba, traveled to the region. During the following winter, he organized the Rock Lake Colonization Co. In summer 1879, the party of eight men arrived at Crystal Creek. By 1882, Crystal City was a substantial town. The earliest newspaper reference is for the land development that year.

The community was moved near the railway, which is no longer in use, for more attraction. The local school is named after him: Thomas Greenway Middle School (TGMS). TGMS has grades 4–8, and the Crystal City Early Years School (CCEY) has grades K-3.

The community has a rich heritage as a thriving agricultural service centre. Since the 1960s, Crystal City has had to adapt to changes brought about by the trend toward larger farms and an aging population.

== Demographics ==
In the 2021 Census of Population conducted by Statistics Canada, Crystal City had a population of 401 living in 193 of its 225 total private dwellings, a change of 3.1% from its 2016 population of 389. With a land area of 2.78 km^{2} (1.07 sq mi), it had a population density of 144.2/km^{2} (373.6/sq mi) in 2021.

== Attractions ==
The Crystal City Printing Museum, open on a full-time basis, is designated as a Provincial Heritage Site.

== Notable people ==
- Matt Epp, musician
- Dennis Thiessen, wheelchair curler, Paralympian

== See also ==
- Sarles–Crystal City Border Crossing
