= Cartwright, Manitoba =

Cartwright
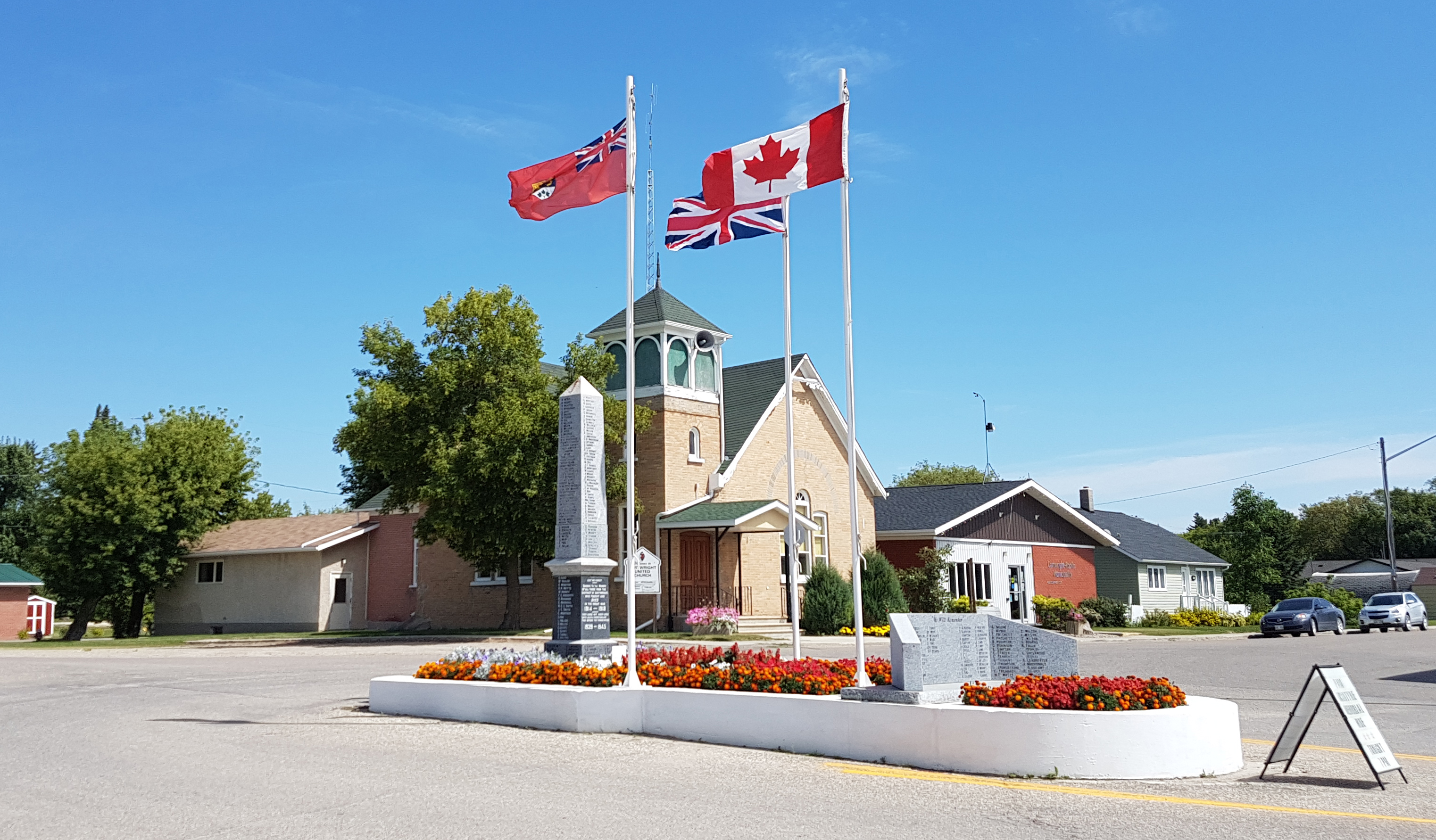
- Flags and the war cenotaph in Cartwright with the Cartwright United Church in the background.

- Emblem

- Location of Cartwright in Manitoba
- Coordinates: 49°09′38″N 99°34′15″W
- Country: Canada
- Province: Manitoba
- Region: Pembina Valley
- Census Division: No. 4

Government
  - Governing Body: Cartwright-Roblin Municipal Council
  - MP: Grant Jackson
  - MLA: Doyle Piwniuk

Population (2011)
  - Total: 302
  - Density: 165.2/km^{2} (428/sq mi)
- Time zone: UTC−6 (CST)
  - Summer (DST): UTC−5 (CDT)
- Area code: 204
- GNBC Code: GBACH

Cartwright is an unincorporated urban community in the Cartwright – Roblin Municipality within the Canadian province of Manitoba that held village status prior to January 1, 2015. It was originally incorporated as a village on December 31, 1947.

== History ==
Situated along the Badger Creek, the original location of Cartwright (also known as the Badger, or Old Cartwright) was established in 1879 by pioneers following the Boundary Commission Trail. Old Cartwright began on two townsites, one owned by P.C. McKibbin, the other by J.C. Waugh. The two men admired Sir Richard Cartwright and agreed to name their communities "Cartwright."

Waugh's land, being directly on the Boundary Commission Trail, became the area truly considered Cartwright.

In 1885, the location of Cartwright was moved 3.2 kilometres south to its present location to coincide with the building of the Canadian Pacific Railway line through that area. Cartwright's original location was along the Badger Creek and the Boundary Commission Trail and was known as the Badger, about two miles north of where it is today. Cartwright moved to its current location in 1885 with the building of the railway through this area. The community of Cartwright is located at the corner of Highway #5 and Highway #3 in the RM of Roblin, within the Province of Manitoba, in Canada. Ponderosa Days, Cartwright's annual summer celebration, is held on August long weekend.

== Demographics ==
In the 2021 Census of Population conducted by Statistics Canada, Cartwright had a population of 353 living in 172 of its 188 total private dwellings, a change of 0.3% from its 2016 population of 352. With a land area of 1.88 km^{2} (0.73 sq mi), it had a population density of 187.8/km^{2} (486.3/sq mi) in 2021.

== Industry ==
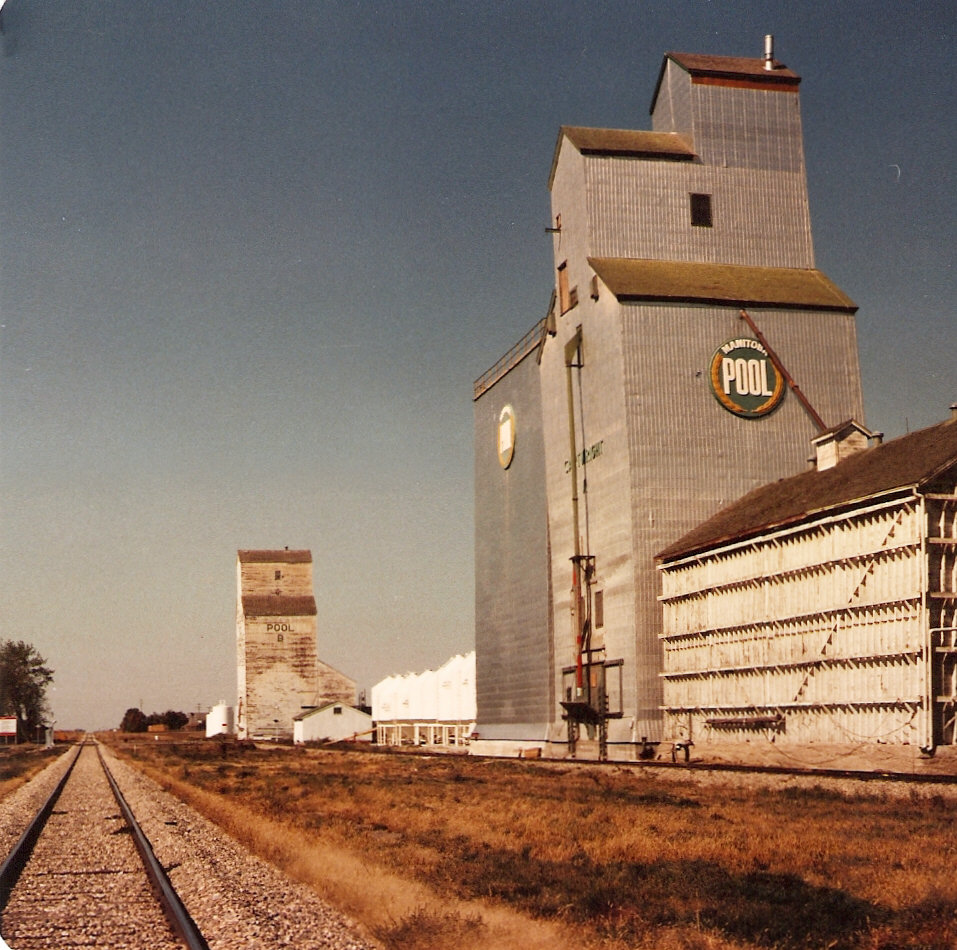
Manitoba Pool Elevator and Federal Elevator in 1985, Cartwright.

Primarily a farming community, Cartwright does include manufacturing industry, including trailer manufacturing, a trailer parts supply company, a small mechanic shop, an Ag and Auto repair shop, a farm supply store, "Ready To Move" or "RTM" house construction, cabinet-makers, and associated supply retailers.

== Southern Manitoba Review ==
The local newspaper, the Rock Lake Review, was started in 1899 by Robert J.C. Stead; in 1904 the paper was renamed The Southern Manitoba Review. In 1908 the paper was taken over by Stead's brothers-in-law, D.J. and Will Wallace and continued to operate in the Wallace family, until closing Dec. 31, 2021.

== Places of interest ==
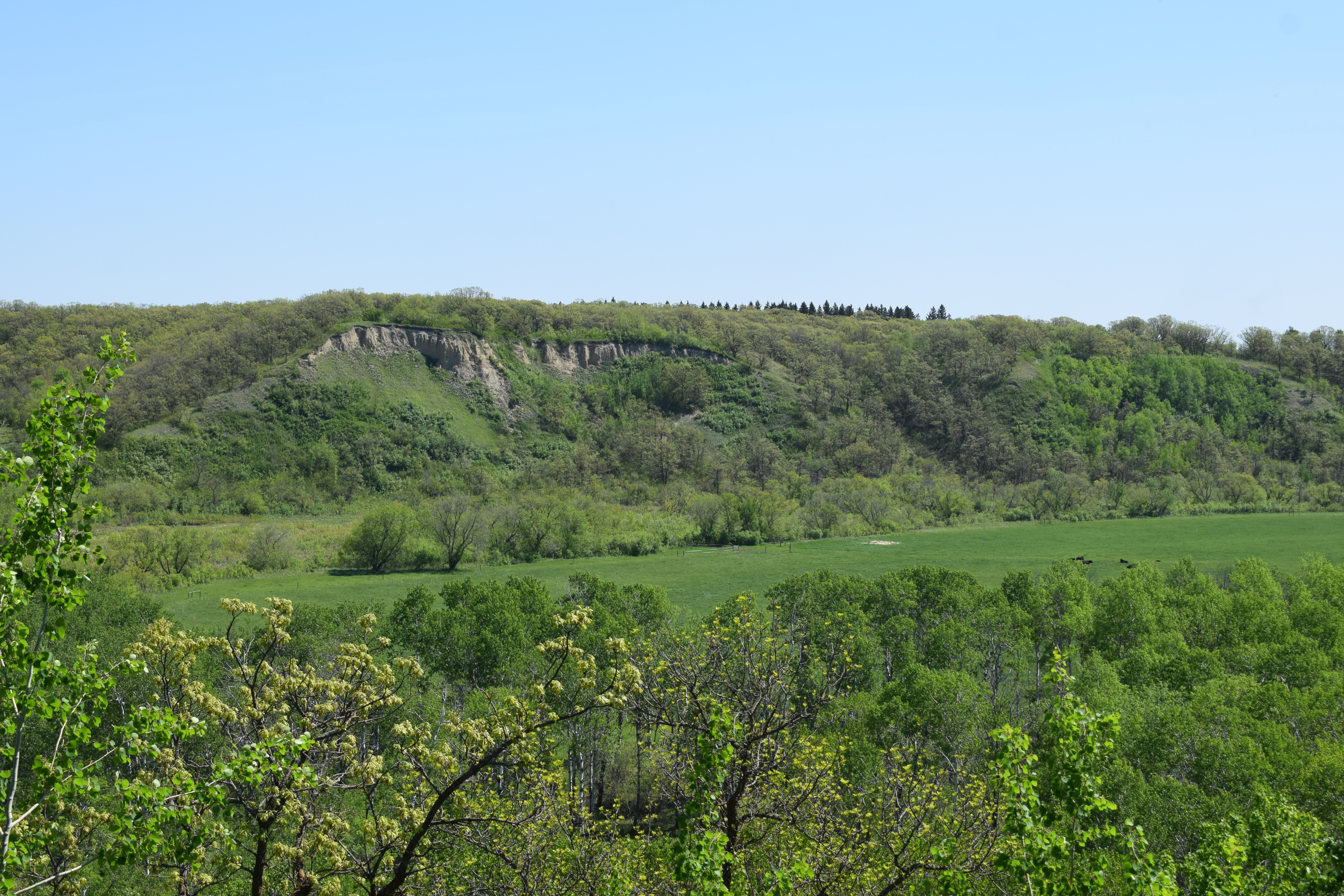
Clay Banks Bison Jump north of Cartwright, a Manitoba Historical site.

- The Clay Banks (buffalo jump), a site about 2,500 years old, used by Sonata and Besant First Nations as a hunting tool. Hunters would stampede American bison over these cliffs, later carving up the animal carcasses below for use as food, tools, and clothing.
- Heritage Park Museums, a collection of historic buildings including a shoe repair shop, post office, Manitoba Telephone System building, and a single-room school house. Each building contains a collection of artifacts relating to the building's former use.
- Blacksmith Museum, a fully restored and working blacksmith's shop. Opened upon request.
- Badger Creek Crossing Cairn, marking the original site of Old Cartwright.
- Cartwright Town & Country Golf Club, a 9-hole golf course.
- Rock Lake Beach, approximately 18 km north of Cartwright, features lots for cabins, fishing, boating and other water recreation.

== Notable people ==
- Bill Robinson, ice hockey centre
- Robert J.C. Stead, writer

== See also ==
- Hansboro–Cartwright Border Crossing
