= Municipality of Louise =

Rural municipality in Manitoba, Canada

Louise
- Rural municipality
- Municipality of Louise
- Location of the Municipality of Louise in Manitoba
- Coordinates: 49°10′38″N 98°52′46″W
- Country: Canada
- Province: Manitoba
- Region: Pembina Valley
- Incorporated (amalgamated): January 1, 2015

Area
  - Total: 934.81 km^{2} (360.93 sq mi)

Population (2021)
  - Total: 2,025
  - Density: 2.166/km^{2} (5.610/sq mi)
- Time zone: UTC-6 (CST)
  - Summer (DST): UTC-5 (CDT)
- Website: www.louisemb.com

The Municipality of Louise is a rural municipality (RM) in the Pembina Valley Region of the southern portion of the Canadian province of Manitoba.

== History ==
It was created on January 1, 2015 via the amalgamation of the RM of Louise, the Town of Pilot Mound and the Village of Crystal City. It was formed as a requirement of The Municipal Amalgamations Act, which required that municipalities with a population less than 1,000 amalgamate with one or more neighbouring municipalities by 2015. The Government of Manitoba initiated these amalgamations in order for municipalities to meet the 1997 minimum population requirement of 1,000 to incorporate a municipality.

== Communities ==
- Clearwater
- Crystal City
- Pilot Mound

== Demographics ==
In the 2021 Census of Population conducted by Statistics Canada, Louise had a population of 2,025 living in 754 of its 884 total private dwellings, a change of 5.6% from its 2016 population of 1,918. With a land area of 934.81 km^{2} (360.93 sq mi), it had a population density of 2.2/km^{2} (5.6/sq mi) in 2021.

== See also ==
- Hannah–Snowflake Border Crossing
- Sarles–Crystal City Border Crossing
- Royal eponyms in Canada
