= Pilot Mound, Manitoba =

Pilot Mound
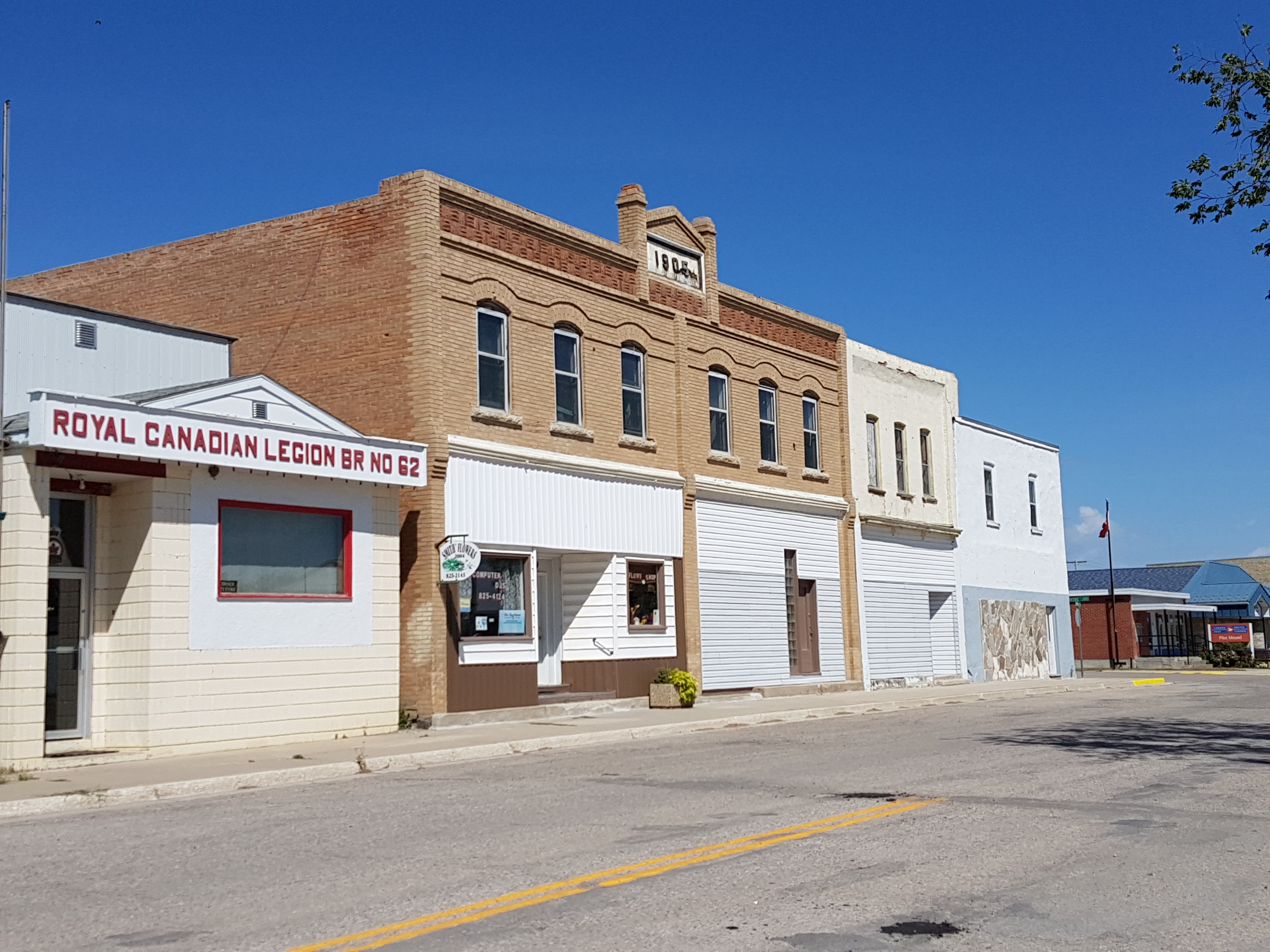
- Main Street

- Location of Pilot Mound in Manitoba
- Coordinates: 49°12′05″N 98°53′38″W
- Country: Canada
- Province: Manitoba
- Region: Pembina Valley
- Rural Municipality: Municipality of Louise
- Established: 1881

Government
  - MP (Brandon-Souris): Grant Jackson (CPC)
  - MLA (Turtle Mountain): Doyle Piwniuk (PC)

Area
  - Total: 2.65 km^{2} (1.02 sq mi)
- Elevation: 338 m (1,109 ft)

Population (2016)
  - Total: 627
  - Density: 236.6/km^{2} (613/sq mi)
  - Change 2011-2016: ▼1.3%
- Time zone: UTC-6 (CST)
  - Summer (DST): UTC-5 (CDT)
- Postal code span: R0G
- Area code: 204

Pilot Mound is an unincorporated community recognized as a local urban district that also once held town status in the Canadian province of Manitoba. It is located within the Municipality of Louise, approximately 60 km west of the City of Morden.

== Geography ==
=== Climate ===
Climate data for Pilot Mound (1981-2010)
Month	Jan	Feb	Mar	Apr	May	Jun	Jul	Aug	Sep	Oct	Nov	Dec	Year
Record high °C (°F)	9 (48)	11 (52)	20 (68)	35 (95)	35.7 (96.3)	37.2 (99.0)	37.8 (100.0)	38.3 (100.9)	37.8 (100.0)	32.2 (90.0)	22.2 (72.0)	12.2 (54.0)	38.3 (100.9)
Mean daily maximum °C (°F)	−11.1 (12.0)	−7.1 (19.2)	−1.1 (30.0)	9.8 (49.6)	18.2 (64.8)	22.8 (73.0)	24.9 (76.8)	24.8 (76.6)	19.0 (66.2)	10.1 (50.2)	−0.4 (31.3)	−7.9 (17.8)	8.5 (47.3)
Daily mean °C (°F)	−15.7 (3.7)	−11.9 (10.6)	−5.6 (21.9)	4.1 (39.4)	11.8 (53.2)	17.0 (62.6)	19.2 (66.6)	18.6 (65.5)	13.1 (55.6)	4.9 (40.8)	−4.5 (23.9)	−12 (10)	3.2 (37.8)
Mean daily minimum °C (°F)	−20.2 (−4.4)	−16.6 (2.1)	−10.1 (13.8)	−1.6 (29.1)	5.4 (41.7)	11.1 (52.0)	13.4 (56.1)	12.3 (54.1)	7.0 (44.6)	−0.3 (31.5)	−8.6 (16.5)	−16.1 (3.0)	−2 (28)
Record low °C (°F)	−41.1 (−42.0)	−40 (−40)	−36.7 (−34.1)	−26 (−15)	−12.2 (10.0)	−3.3 (26.1)	2.2 (36.0)	−0.1 (31.8)	−7.2 (19.0)	−16.9 (1.6)	−35.1 (−31.2)	−39 (−38)	−41.1 (−42.0)
Average precipitation mm (inches)	23.3 (0.92)	19.7 (0.78)	24.3 (0.96)	25.6 (1.01)	75.0 (2.95)	92.9 (3.66)	82.1 (3.23)	72.5 (2.85)	44.8 (1.76)	35.9 (1.41)	26.5 (1.04)	25.4 (1.00)	548.0 (21.57)
Source: Environment Canada

== History ==
Pilot Mound takes its name from a mound of shale that rises above the landscape. The "old mound" as it's called served as a pilot for early fur traders, settlers and explorers. Originally settled in 1878, Pilot Mound moved to its present location in 1885 to get closer to the Canadian Pacific Railway line that moved through the area. Notable landmarks in the Pilot Mound area include the stone bank vault, used to store land titles documents. A Manitoba Pool Elevator stood in Pilot Mound and was in operation from 1957 until 2000, when it was closed down by Agricore. The building was later demolished in 2003. The Pilot Mound school district was established in 1880. A two-story school known as "Big Red" was used as the main school until 1905, when a new brick school was built in the town. The brick school stood until 1959, when it was replaced with a new structure known as the Pilot Mound Consolidated School. From 1960 and on, this school served as the main school in the area, consolidating the former country schools.

== Demographics ==
In the 2021 Census of Population conducted by Statistics Canada, Pilot Mound had a population of 675 living in 286 of its 342 total private dwellings, a change of 7.7% from its 2016 population of 627. With a land area of 2.65 km^{2} (1.02 sq mi), it had a population density of 254.7/km^{2} (659.7/sq mi) in 2021.

== Sports ==
Pilot Mound is home to the Pilot Mound Pilots ice hockey team who play in the Tiger Hills Hockey League. The community was a finalist in CBC Television's Kraft Hockeyville competition in 2008.

== Notable people ==
- Thomas Bellamy, politician
- Delaney Collins, hockey player
- Jim Collins (curler), Brier-winning curler
- Edward Dow, politician
- Paul Hiebert, writer
- Black Jack Stewart, Hockey Hall of Famer
- Nolan Thiessen, Tim Hortons Brier champion
- Riley Weselowski, professional hockey player
