= List of generating stations in Manitoba =

This is a list of public utility electrical generating stations in Manitoba, Canada.

Manitoba produces close to 97% of its electricity through hydropower. The most important hydroelectric development in Manitoba is the 3,955-megawatt Nelson River Hydroelectric Project. Its five power stations produced 27.4 terawatt-hours of electricity in 2014-2015, meeting 75.7% of the provincial demand.

Manitoba Hydro, the government-owned public utility is the main power generator in the province with 15 hydroelectric generating stations, 2 fossil-fuel plants and 4 diesel generators, for a total installed capacity of 5,701 MW.

== Hydroelectric ==
Name	Location	River	Type	Date	Units	Capacity (MW)	Owner	Ref
Grand Rapids Generating Station	53°9′29″N 99°17′33″W	Saskatchewan River	Reservoir	1965	4	479	Manitoba Hydro	
Great Falls Dam	50°27′47″N 96°0′11″W	Winnipeg River	Run-of-the-river	1922	6	129	Manitoba Hydro	
Jenpeg Generating Station	54°32′36″N 98°1′36″W	Nelson River	Reservoir	1979	6	122	Manitoba Hydro	
Kelsey Generating Station	56°2′21″N 96°31′54″W	Nelson River	Reservoir	1957	7	287	Manitoba Hydro	
Kettle Generating Station	56°23′3″N 94°37′54″W	Nelson River	Reservoir	1970	12	1,220	Manitoba Hydro	
Laurie River 1 Generating Station	56°13′31.4″N 101°0′35.6″W	Laurie River	Reservoir	1952	3	5	Manitoba Hydro	
Laurie River 2 Generating Station	56°15′2.1″N 101°7′5.5″W	Laurie River	Reservoir	1958	3	5	Manitoba Hydro	
Limestone Generating Station	56°30′25″N 94°6′25″W	Nelson River	Run-of-the-river	1990	10	1,350	Manitoba Hydro	
Long Spruce Generating Station	56°24′1″N 94°22′10″W	Nelson River	Run-of-the-river	1977	10	980	Manitoba Hydro	
McArthur Falls Generating Station	50°23′51″N 95°59′31″W	Winnipeg River	Run-of-the-river	1954	8	56	Manitoba Hydro	
Pine Falls Generating Station	50°34′5″N 96°10′37″W	Winnipeg River	Run-of-the-river	1952	6	87	Manitoba Hydro	
Pointe du Bois Hydroelectric Dam	50°18′2″N 95°32′39″W	Winnipeg River	Run-of-the-river	1911	16	75	Manitoba Hydro (Winnipeg Hydro)	
Seven Sisters Generating Station	50°7′13″N 96°0′44″W	Winnipeg River	Run-of-the-river	1931	6	165	Manitoba Hydro	
Slave Falls Generating Station	50°13′21″N 95°34′6″W	Winnipeg River	Run-of-the-river	1931	8	68	Manitoba Hydro (Winnipeg Hydro)	
Wuskwatim Generating Station	55°32′16″N 98°29′46″W	Burntwood River	Reservoir	2012	3	211	Wuskwatim Power Limited Partnership and Manitoba Hydro	
Keeyask Generating Station	56°20′57″N 95°12′10″W	Nelson River	Run-of-the-river	2022	7	695	Tataskweyak Cree Nation/Fox Lake Cree Nation/War Lake First Nation/York Factory First Nation/Keeyask Hydropower Limited Partnership and Manitoba Hydro	

== Wind ==
The two wind farms in Manitoba are privately owned and sell energy to Manitoba Hydro for distribution to customers.

Name	Location	Capacity (MW)	Date	Owner	Ref
St. Leon Wind Farm	St. Leon	99	2005	Algonquin Power	
St. Joseph Wind Farm	Montcalm	138	2011	Pattern Energy	

== Fossil fuels ==
Name	Location	Units	Capacity (MW)	Date	Owner	Type	Ref
Brandon Generating Station	49°50′44″N 99°53′16″W	3	327	1958–2002	Manitoba Hydro	Natural gas	
Selkirk Generating Station	50°8′32″N 96°53′3″W	2	125	1958–2020	Manitoba Hydro	Natural gas	

== Off-grid ==
List of all Manitoba Hydro power plants in Manitoba serving loads in communities not connected to the North American power grid.

Name	Location	Capacity (MW)	Date	Owner	Type	Ref
Brochet	Brochet	3		Manitoba Hydro	Diesel	
Lac Brochet	Lac Brochet	2		Manitoba Hydro	Diesel	
Shamattawa	Shamattawa	3		Manitoba Hydro	Diesel	
Tadoule Lake	Tadoule Lake	2		Manitoba Hydro	Diesel	

== See also ==
- Energy in Canada
- List of power stations in Canada
- Nelson River DC Transmission System
