= Jacob Andersen =

Jacob Andersen may refer to:

- Jacob Andersen (singer), Danish singer
- Jacob Andersen (footballer) (born 2004), Danish footballer
- Jacob Dehn Andersen (born 1995), Danish footballer
- Jacob Rolsdorph Andersen (1828–1901), Norwegian judge
- Jacob Andersen (sailor) (1892–1955), Danish sailor
- Jacob Andersen, co-founder of IO Interactive
- Jacob Andersen, Danish co-creator of Dracco's Filly Funtasia

== See also ==
- Jacob Anderson (disambiguation)
- Jacob Andersson (born 1995), Swedish ice hockey player
