= Jacob Anderson (disambiguation) =

Jacob Anderson (born 1990) is a British actor, singer-songwriter, rapper, and record producer.

Jacob Anderson may also refer to:

- Jacob Anderson (field hockey) (born 1997), Australian field hockey player
- Jacob Anderson (priest) (died 1962), Canadian Anglican priest
- Jacob Anderson, frat president involved in Baylor University sexual assault scandal
- Prof (rapper) (real name Jacob Anderson; born 1984), American rapper

== See also ==
- Jacob Andersen (disambiguation)
- Jake Anderson (disambiguation)
- Jacob Anderson-Minshall (born 1967), American author and LGBTQ activist
- Jacob Andersson (born 1995), Swedish ice hockey player
