= All Saints' Anglican Church =

All Saints' Anglican Church or All Saints Anglican Church may refer to the following Anglican churches:

== Australia ==
- All Saints Anglican Church, Brisbane, Queensland
- All Saints' Anglican Church, Condobolin, New South Wales
- All Saints Anglican Church, Darnley Island, Queensland
- All Saints' Anglican Church, Derrinallum, Victoria
- All Saints Anglican Church, Henley Brook, Western Australia
- All Saints' Anglican Church, Newtown, Victoria
- All Saints Anglican Church, Petersham, New South Wales
- All Saints' Anglican Church, St Kilda East, Victoria
- All Saints Anglican Church, Yandilla, Queensland

== Canada ==
- All Saints Anglican Church (Dominion City, Manitoba)
- All Saints Anglican Church (Ottawa)

== United Kingdom ==
- All Saints' Church, Petersham, London
