= St. Leon Wind Farm =

Wind farm in St. Leon, Manitoba, Canada

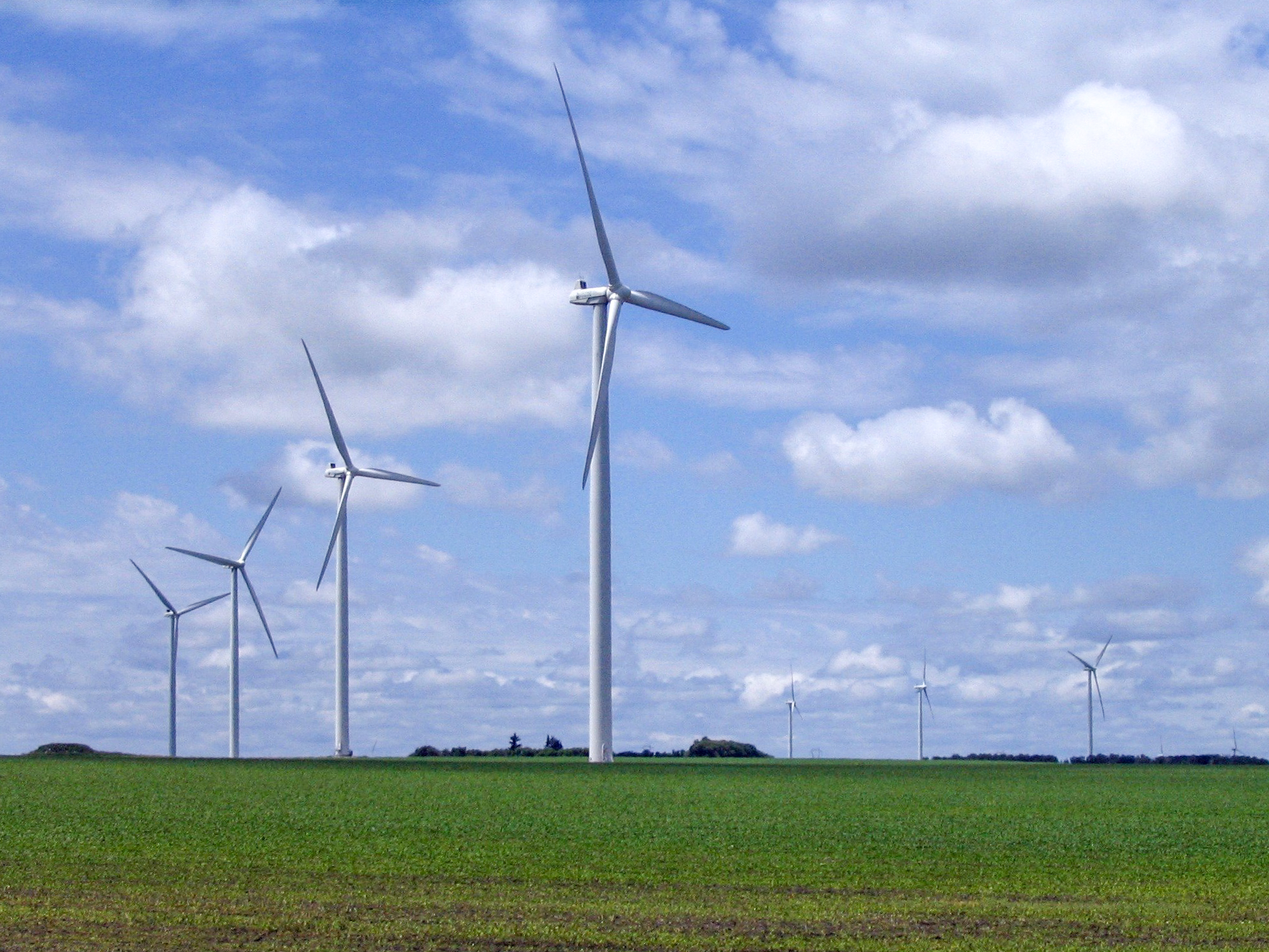
- Wind turbines near St. Leon, Manitoba
- Country: Canada
- Location: Rural Municipality of Lorne / Rural Municipality of Pembina, near St. Leon, Manitoba
- Coordinates: 49°21′37″N 98°32′15″W
- Construction cost: C$200 million
- Owner: Algonquin Power Income Fund

Wind farm
- Type: Onshore
- Hub height: 80 m (262 ft)
- Site area: 93 km^{2} (35.9 sq mi)

Power generation
- Units operational: 63
- Nameplate capacity: 120 MW

St. Leon Wind Farm (French: Parc éolien de Saint-Léon) is Manitoba's first wind farm, in St. Leon, Manitoba, Canada. In the first phase completed in 2006, 63 wind turbines were erected over a 93-square-kilometre (36 sq mi) area, capable of delivering 99 megawatts (MW). In 2011 a further 10 turbines were purchased, expanding the capacity of the project to 120 megawatts.

== Wind turbines ==
Each turbine has three blades made with carbon fiber and balsa wood. Each blade is 41 metres (135 ft) long. The nacelle containing the gearbox and generator is mounted on a tubular steel 80-metre (262 ft) tower. The assembly of blades, hub, gearbox, and generator, in total weighs around 220 tonnes. The blades turn at 14 revolutions per minute when the generator is turning at 1200 RPM; the speed increase makes the generator more compact and the overall system more efficient. Each tower has a 4-metre-diameter (13 ft) concrete foundation which extends between 10 and 15 metres (33 and 49 ft) below grade. The generators produce AC power at around 600 Volts and 60 Hertz. Each tower has a step-up transformer connecting the turbine by an underground cable to the 35 kV overhead wood pole line collection network. The collection network connects the turbines to a step-up transformer station, where the voltage is increase to 230 kV and connection is made to the Manitoba Hydro transmission network. Manitoba Hydro has a 25-year power purchase agreement with Algonquin Power Income Fund, which owns and operates the wind farm.

The Danish-built turbines are designed to operate on wind speeds between 12.6 and 90 kilometres per hour (8 and 56 mph). In very cold weather, −33 °C (−27 °F) or lower, the units are shut down. About 90% of the year there is sufficient wind to operate the turbines, although not necessarily at full output. In recent years the project has generated at a 35-to-40% annual capacity factor, due to its favorable site.

The array is dispersed over 9,000 hectares (22,200 acres) of farmland on the Pembina Escarpment, about 150 kilometres (93 mi) south-west of Winnipeg, Manitoba, in the rural municipalities of Lorne and Pembina. About five per cent of the area is covered by access roads and foundation sites, leaving the rest available for crops or cattle grazing. Each of the fifty area landowners is paid for the use of the land occupied by a turbine.

The capital cost of the first phase of the project was around C$200 million. About $30 million was provided by the federal Wind Power Production Incentive. The 2011 expansion cost an additional $30 million; the additional turbines were in operation by the spring of 2012.

== See also ==
- St. Joseph Wind Farm
- List of wind farms in Canada
