= Seven Sisters Generating Station =

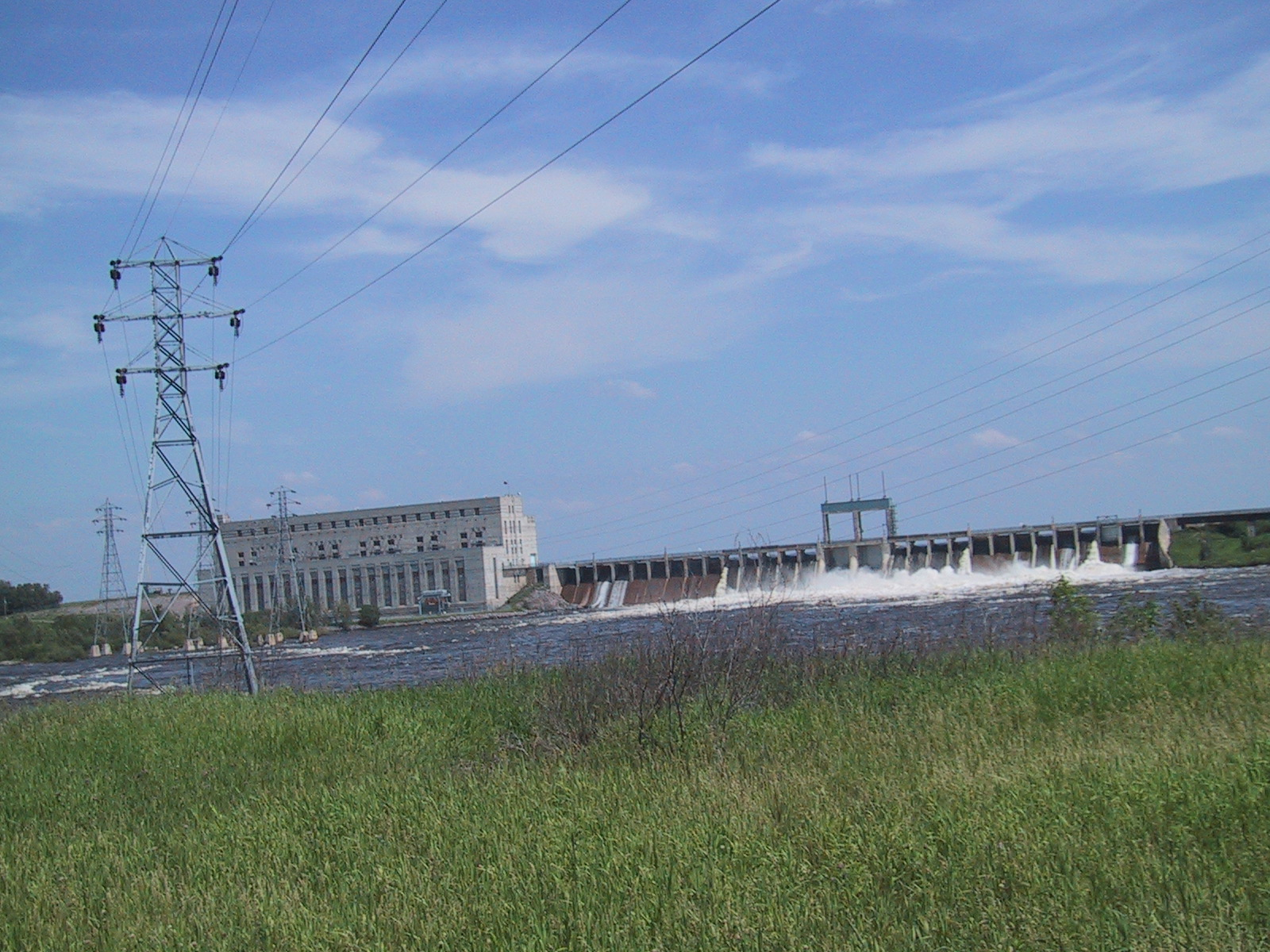
- The Seven Sisters Generating Station, from the downstream side.

- Location within Manitoba
- Country: Canada
- Location: near Seven Sisters Falls, Manitoba
- Coordinates: 50°7′13″N 96°0′44″W
- Status: Operational
- Construction began: 1929
- Opening date: 1952
- Owner: Manitoba Hydro

Dam and spillways
- Impounds: Winnipeg River
- Length: 128 metres (420 ft)
- Spillways: 2

Reservoir
- Creates: Natalie Lake

Power Station
- Type: Conventional
- Installed capacity: 165 megawatts
- Annual generation: 990 million kilowatt-hours
- Website; Manitoba Hydro

The Seven Sisters Generating Station is a hydroelectric generating station located on the Winnipeg River, in eastern Manitoba near Seven Sisters Falls, Manitoba. The reservoir is called Natalie Lake and is used for recreational boating and fishing.

The present capacity of the generating station is 165 megawatts, and in a typical year the station can produce 990 million kilowatt-hours. It is the largest generating station on the Winnipeg River. Power is transmitted over five 115 kV lines to Winnipeg, and sixth and seventh lines to the Whiteshell and on to Kenora, Ontario.

The powerhouse is 128 metres long. The total discharge of water from the station is 1,146 cubic metres per second, with a total drop from forebay to tailrace of 18.6 metres. The station has a 225 metre-long spillway. The forebay nominal elevation is 274.2 metres AMSL and the forebay area is 21 square kilometres. The forebay is retained by more than 12 km of dykes.

== History ==
Construction of the station by the Winnipeg Electric Company (now a part of Manitoba Hydro) started in 1929, with first power in 1931, producing 75 megawatts from three vertical turbine-generator units. The second stage of construction began in 1948, when the last three units were installed. The last units were installed in 1952.

When first constructed, operating staff lived in the townsite (Seven Sisters, Manitoba), but the plant was automated in the 1970s and put under remote control, requiring a much smaller on-site staff.

== See also ==
- List of generating stations in Manitoba
