= Centra Gas Manitoba =

Natural gas distributor in Manitoba, Canada

Centra Gas Manitoba Inc.
- Formerly: Winnipeg & Central Gas Company (1953–8); Central Winnipeg Gas Company (1958–90); ICG Utilities (Manitoba) (1990–1)
- Industry: Energy
- Founded: 1953; 72 years ago
- Headquarters: Winnipeg, Manitoba, Canada
- Area served: Manitoba, Canada
- Key people: Otto Lang, President & CEO (1993– )
- Owner: Manitoba Hydro
- Number of employees: 661 (1999)

Centra Gas Manitoba Inc., a subsidiary of Manitoba Hydro, is the primary distributor of natural gas in Manitoba, serving the Winnipeg and surrounding area, including rural communities. The company had a gas distribution monopoly in Manitoba until 1991.

Based in Winnipeg, it is regulated by the Public Utilities Board of Manitoba.

== History ==
Centra Gas Manitoba initially received its provincial charter in 1953.

It was privately owned by Vancouver-based Westcoast Energy from 1990 until 1999, when it was purchased by Manitoba Hydro. In the couple of years preceding the sale, Centra began speculative natural gas trading, leading to a CA$45.5 million loss which Manitoba utility regulators ruled could not be recovered by the company through a rate hike, forcing shareholders to absorb the loss. Moreover, as early as 1996, Centra had been working with Manitoba Hydro to reduce costs by combining forces on activities like power meter reading and billing.

Centra Gas Manitoba was one of four units of Centra Gas Canada (known as ICG Utilities until 1991), the other three being Centra Gas Ontario, Centra Gas Alberta, and Centra Gas British Columbia, which in toto distributed natural gas to 500,000 Canadians and employed about 2000 people as of 1991. Each of the four component companies were regulated utilities, and at least two had un-regulated affiliate firms, such as Centra Energy Services as the affiliate of Centra Gas Manitoba.

As of 1999, Centra had about 240,000 residential and commercial customers. In fiscal 2003, total gas revenues were CA$497 million on 2,123 million cubic metres of gas.
