= Winnipeg Hydro =

Former hydro generation and distribution company in Winnipeg, Canada

- Formerly: City Hydro
- Company type: Municipally owned corporation
- Industry: Hydro generation and distribution
- Founded: 1906; 120 years ago
- Defunct: 2002
- Fate: Merged with Manitoba Hydro
- Successor: Manitoba Hydro
- Headquarters: Winnipeg, Manitoba, Canada
- Area served: City of Winnipeg

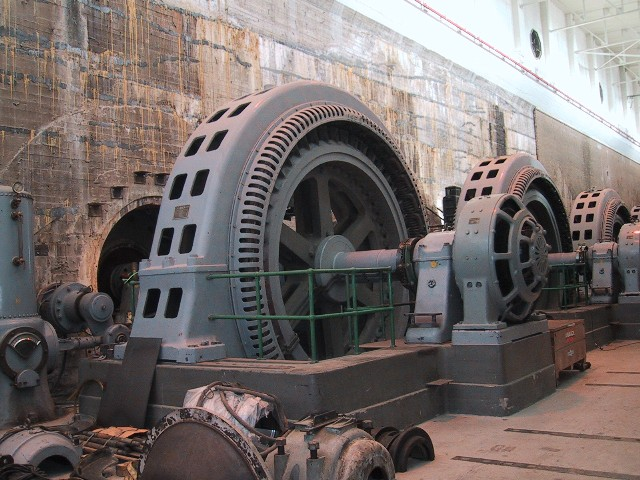
One of the generating units at Pointe Du Bois, the first generating station built by CIty Hydro (Winnipeg Hydro).

Winnipeg Hydro is a former provider of electrical power for the city of Winnipeg, Manitoba, Canada. Winnipeg Hydro was established in 1906 as City Hydro. It was purchased by Manitoba Hydro in 2002.

== History ==
Private electrical generators in the early years of the 20th century charged 20 cents per kilowatt hour for electrical energy. The City of Winnipeg charter did not allow it to operate an electrical utility, so city alderman John Wesley Cockburn obtained development rights for the site at Pointe du Bois Falls. In 1906 the city charter was amended and Cockburn transferred development rights to the city.

In 1906, voters approved a $3.25 million expenditure for development of a hydroelectric plant at Pointe du Bois. Immediately following the decision to build the Pointe du Bois plant, the price of electricity charged by the private sector in Winnipeg dropped from 20 cents per kilowatt-hour to 10 cents and subsequently to 7 1/2 cents. After commissioning the first units of the plant in 1911, Winnipeg Hydro set its rate at 3 1/3 cents per kilowatt-hour. This rate remained unchanged until 1973. Customers of Winnipeg Hydro saw some of the lowest electricity rates in North America. Increasing electrical demand from the city and the Manitoba Power Commission led to the installation of additional generating units at Pointe Du Bois, with a final capacity of 78 megawatts.

In 1924 City Hydro constructed a two-unit coal-fired generating station at Amy Street, with a total capacity of 10 megawatts. Two more units were added in the 1950s bringing total capacity to 50 MW. The Amy Street plant provided electric power and district heating steam until it closed in 1990. During the Second World War, the city saved coal at the Amy Street plant by using surplus hydroelectric power to raise steam for district heating. In 1931 the first two units at Slave Falls were commissioned, generating 17 megawatts. An additional six units installed from 1937 though 1948 brought the station capacity to 67 megawatts.

In 1955, City Hydro sold all its suburban distribution system to the Manitoba Power Commission, and purchased all former privately owned distribution within the city, becoming sole electrical utility in the downtown Winnipeg area. It was agreed that City Hydro would obtain all additional electrical capacity by purchase from the Manitoba Hydro Electric Board instead of developing additional generating stations.

The century-old Pointe du Bois plant has required significant investment to maintain its facilities. An original unit was replaced with a Straflo turbine in 1999, increasing station capacity to 75 MW.

Among the final achievements as Winnipeg Hydro recorded revenues higher than previous years. Infrastructure improvements included the completion of No. 6 Substation (Amy St) building and equipment installation as well as the completion of the installation of new underground cable to connect Scotland Avenue Terminal Station to No. 2 Substation (York) at York Avenue and Garry Street. The last Director of Winnipeg Hydro was Ian McKay.

On February 8, 2002 Manitoba Premier Gary Doer and Winnipeg Mayor Glen Murray confirmed formal offer by Manitoba Hydro for the purchase of Winnipeg Hydro.

On June 26, 2002, Bob Brennan, President & CEO of Manitoba Hydro and Gail Stephens, Chief Administrative Officer of the City of Winnipeg signed the Asset Purchase Agreement to finalize the deal for Manitoba Hydro's purchase of Winnipeg Hydro.

In September 2002, Winnipeg Hydro officially closed its doors and became a part of Manitoba Hydro.

== See also ==
- Manitoba Hydro

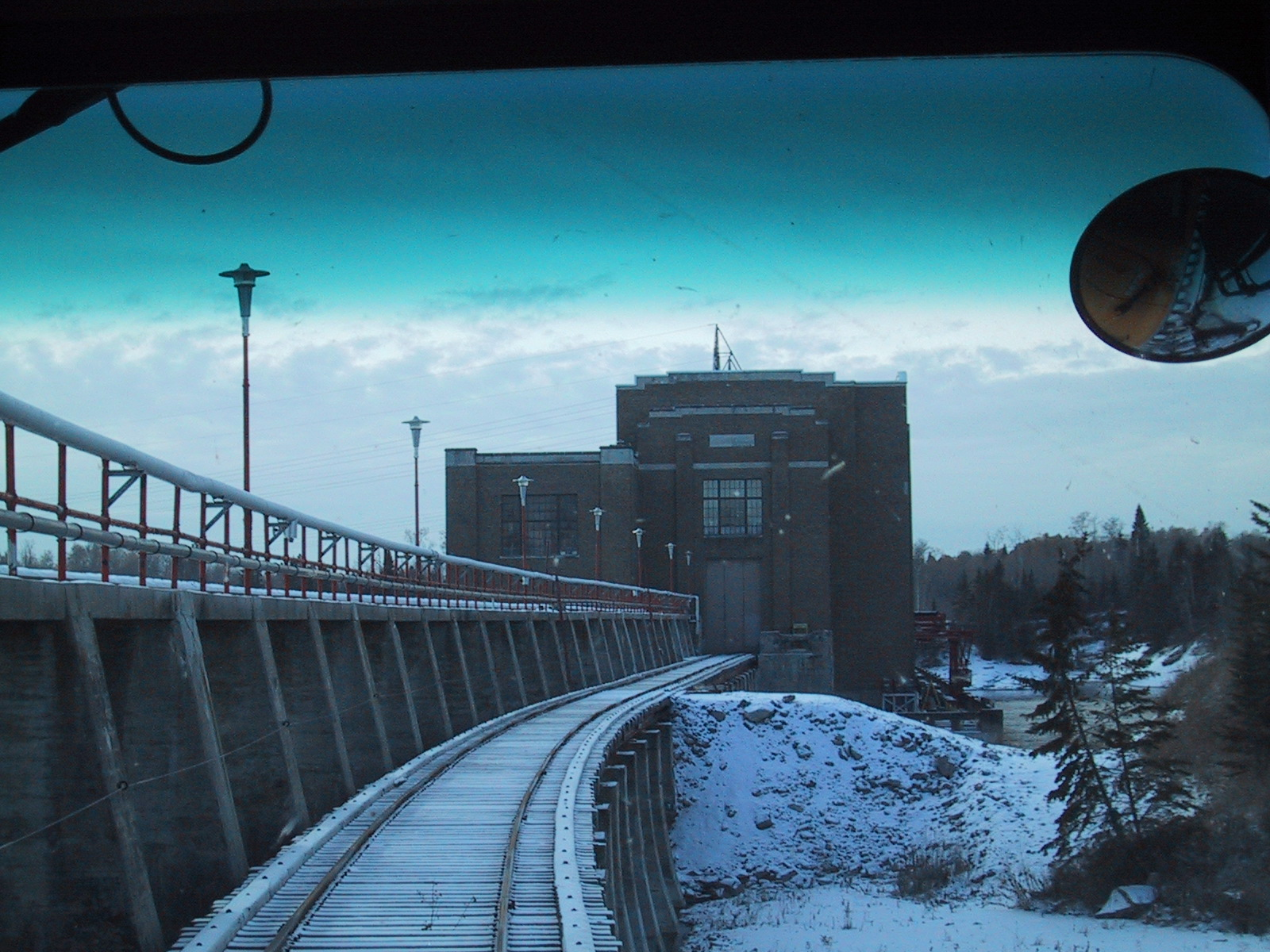
Winnipeg Hydro Slave Falls generating station built 1948, seen from the tramway that was the only access to the site.

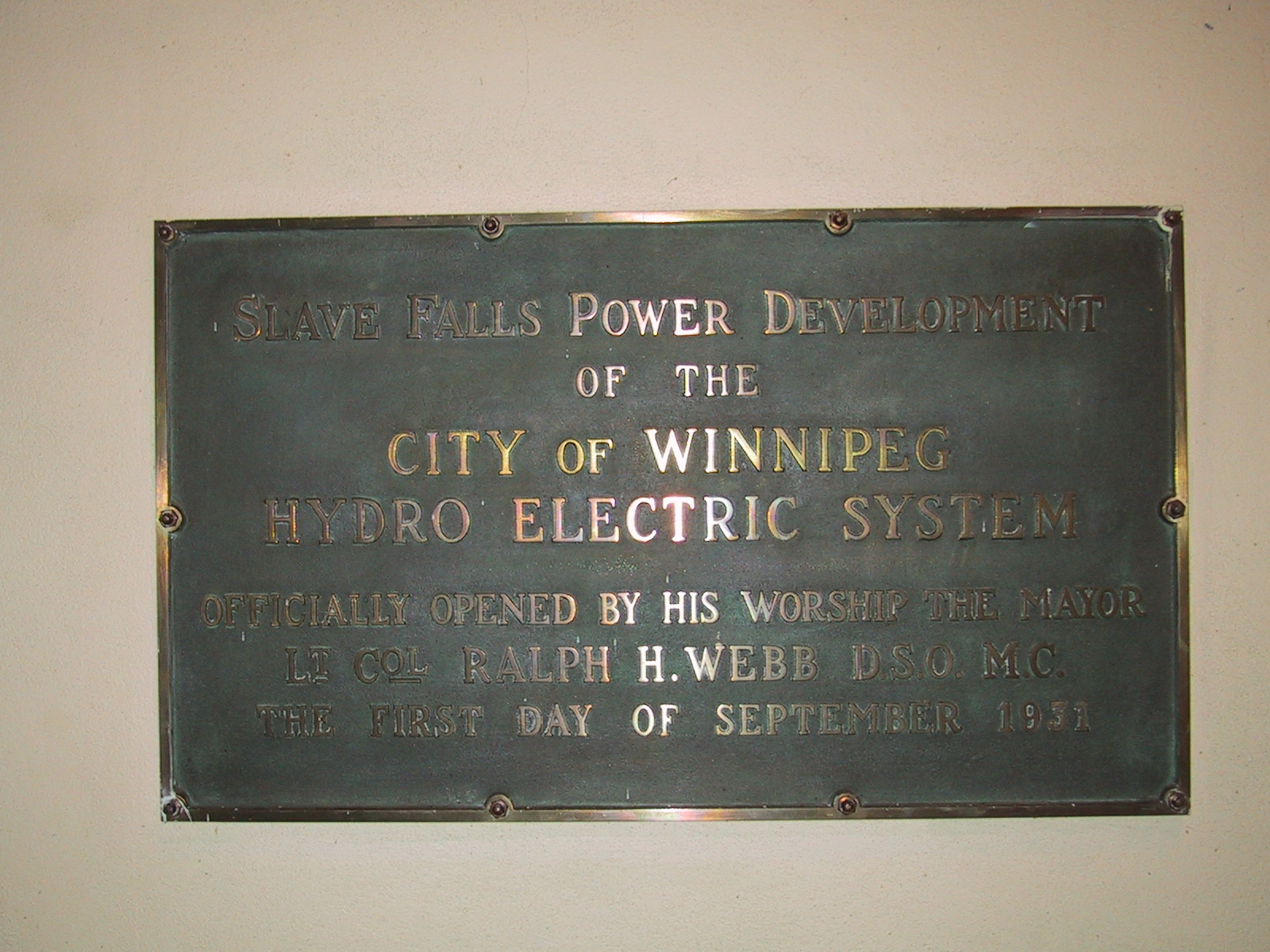
Dedication plaque at Slave Falls Generating Station.
