= Natural gas in Canada =

Natural gas was Canada's third largest source of energy production in 2018, representing 22.3% of all energy produced from fuels in the country. By contrast, the share of fuel-based energy production from natural gas in 2013 was 17.0%, indicating a growth rate of approximately 1.06% per year.

== Reserves ==
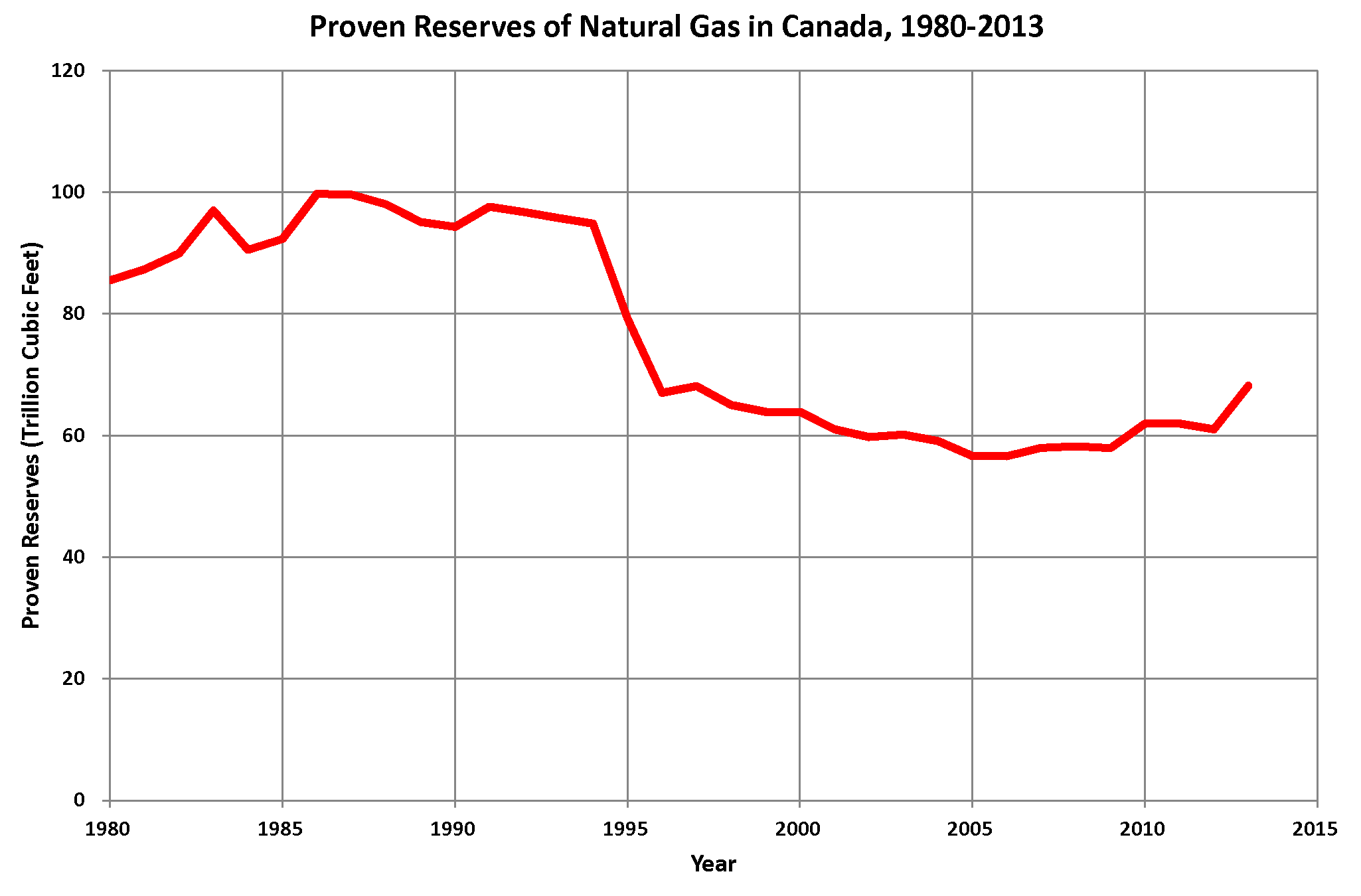
Proved natural gas reserves in Canada (1980-2013)

As of 2017, Canada's gas reserves were estimated 30.8 trillion cubic metres (1.09×10^{15} cu ft), 72% of which is from unconventional tight gas formations in Alberta and British Columbia.

Biogenic gas is produced at shallow depths by microbial activity. The most prolific biogenic gas deposit in Western Canada is the Southeast Alberta Gas Field (SAGF), which is located in southeastern Alberta and southwestern Saskatchewan in the Western Canada Sedimentary Basin and holds an estimated 1.42 trillion m^{3} of recoverable gas.

Gas hydrates are pure methane deposits formed at low temperature and high pressure conditions. They are typically found in the shallow sea in arctic permafrost regions and continental slopes. In Western Canada, the Mackenzie-Beaufort Sea and the continental slope off Vancouver Island are two areas which have undergone extensive exploration drilling and studies. The gas hydrate deposits in these regions are estimated to hold up to 11×10^{13} m^{3} of gas.

The Southeast Alberta Gas Field (SAGF) is a significant biogenic gas accumulation located in southeastern Alberta and southwestern Saskatchewan within the Western Canada Sedimentary Basin. Discovered in 1884 and brought into production in 1904, SAGF has been a major contributor to Canada's natural gas output. It holds an estimated 1.42 trillion cubic meters (50 trillion cubic feet) of recoverable gas. https://www.hartenergy.com/exclusives/production-canadas-montney-duvernay-gains-momentum-207694

In comparison, the Montney and Duvernay formations are among Canada's most prolific unconventional resource plays:

Montney Formation: Spanning northeastern British Columbia and northwestern Alberta, the Montney is considered one of the largest natural gas resources globally. It has an estimated total resource of 900 trillion cubic feet equivalent (Tcfe) of gas in place. Production from the Montney has grown significantly, with natural gas volumes increasing from approximately 0.82 billion cubic feet per day (Bcf/d) in 2010 to 8.06 Bcf/d in 2022.

Duvernay Formation: Located in central Alberta, the Duvernay Formation holds an estimated 443 trillion cubic feet of gas and 61.7 billion barrels of oil. Production from the Duvernay has also seen substantial growth, contributing to Canada's overall natural gas output.

While the SAGF has been a cornerstone of Canada's natural gas production for over a century, the Montney and Duvernay formations represent the future of the country's natural gas industry, with their vast resources and increasing production rates positioning them as key players in both domestic and international energy markets.

https://www.reuters.com/business/energy/canadian-natural-gas-prices-fall-two-year-low-storage-fills-2024-09-23/

== Production ==
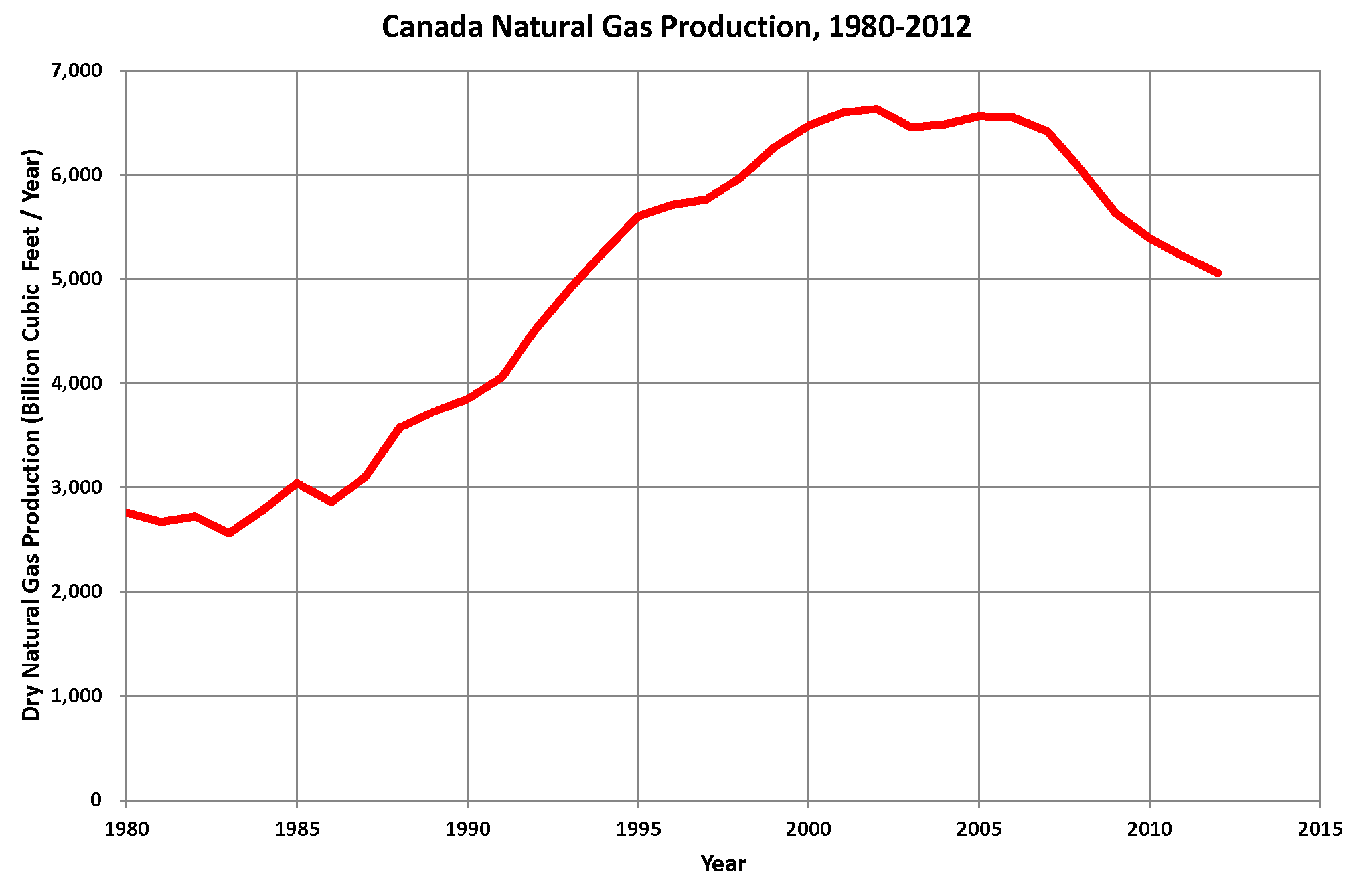
Canada natural gas production (1980-2012)

As of 2017, Canada was the fifth largest producer of natural gas in the world with a total of 473 million cubic metres per day (16.7×10^{9} cu ft/d). in 2017.

=== Liquefied Natural Gas Production ===
There are four LNG plants that serve Canada's domestic demand. Two additional LNG facilities are in the planning stages, with Stolt LNGaz slated to open in 2018 in Becancour, Quebec and Northeast Midstream planning two liquefaction plants in Nipigon and Thorold, Ontario.

Three LNG facilities are in operation in Western Canada as of 2018, and one more is slated to begin operations in 2018:

- Elmworth, Alberta LNG facility - Ferus Natural Gas Fuels Inc.
- Mt Hayes Ladysmith - FortisBC
- Tilbury LNG - FortisBC
- Energir (formerly Gaz Metro) natural gas liquefaction, storage and regasification plant
- Union Gas's Hagar LNG plant, the first to open in Canada

==== Ferus Elmworth LNG ====
Ferus Natural Gas Fuels Inc. (Ferus NGF) began operation of their merchant LNG facility in Elmworth, Alberta in May 2014. This facility can currently produce 50,000 gallons of LNG per day with an expansion capacity of 250,000 gallons per day. The facility receives lean gas from a nearby industry host plant.

==== FortisBC Mt Hayes LNG ====
FortisBC's Mt Hayes facility is located near Ladysmith, Vancouver Island. The facility was completed in 2011 and is owned in a limited partnership between FortisBC, Stz'uminus First Nation, and the Cowichan Tribes. The facility includes a liquefaction system, vaporization system, and storage tank and is connected to the main transmission line via two pipeline spurs. The primary use of the facility is for peak shaving storage, to ensure a steady supply of gas and maintain lower costs during peak demand periods for local customers.

==== FortisBC Tilbury LNG ====
The FortisBC Tilbury Island LNG facility is located in Delta, British Columbia and began operations in 1971. It has the capacity to liquefy 5,000 GJ of gas per day and stores up to 600,000 GJ. Expansion is underway to increase the liquefaction and storage capacities by 34,000 GJ and 1.1 million GJ, respectively.

== Pipelines ==
Across Canada, interprovincial pipelines have the capacity to carry over 1.3 billion cubic metres per day (46×10^{9} cu ft/d) of gas and even more within the boundaries of the individual provinces. The construction of new natural gas pipelines is controversial. RCMP enforcement actions against Wet'suwet'en hereditary chiefs in 2020 and 2021 at the Coastal Gas Link pipeline led to wide spread protests across the country.

== Domestic consumption ==
=== Electricity generation ===
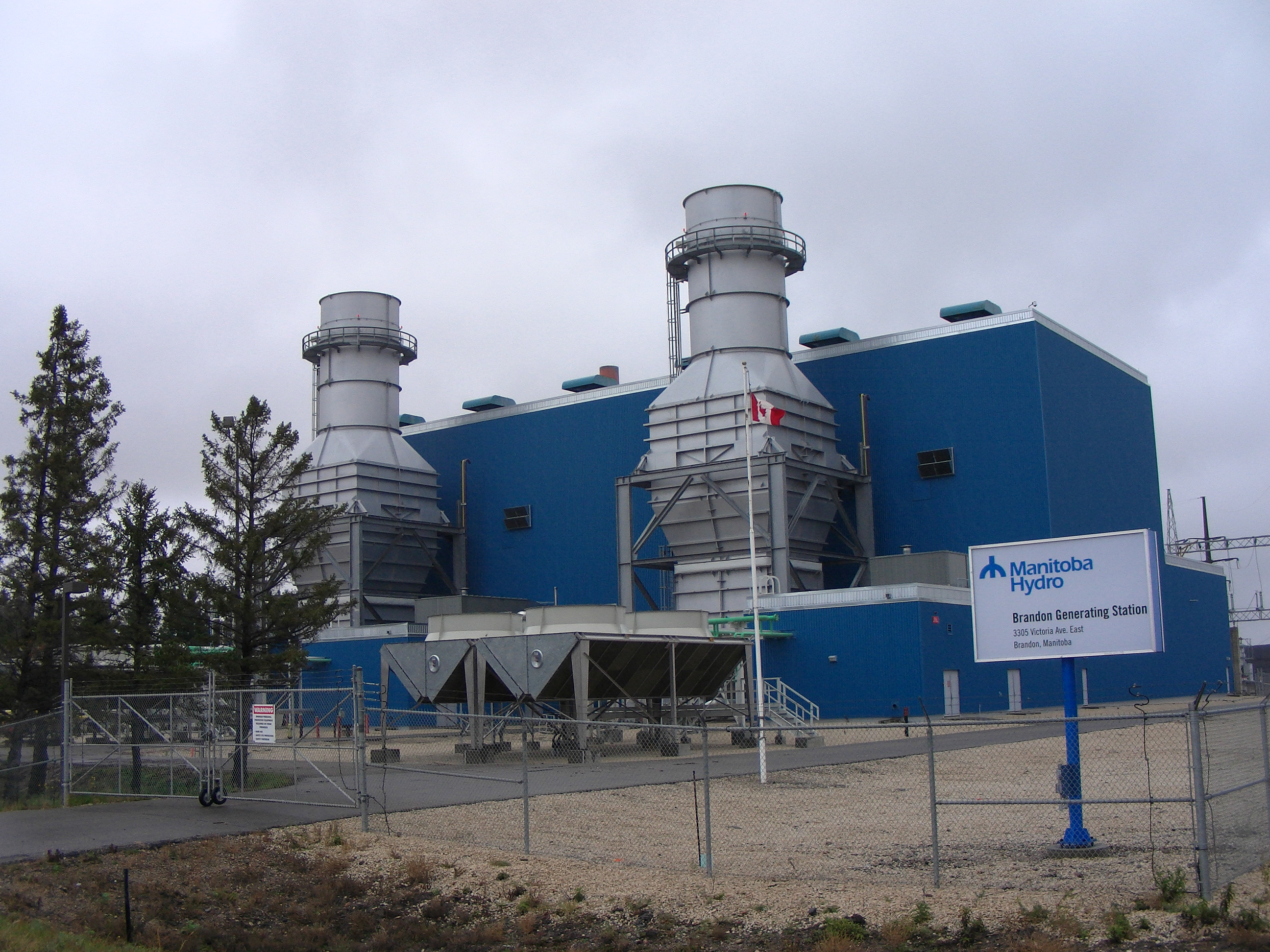
Brandon Generating Station was converted from burning coal to burning natural gas in 2018.

In 2016 natural gas was used to provide 35% of all energy in Canada, double the amount supplied by electricity. Electricity generated by natural gas was 8.5% of the nation's total. Natural gas is used to supply 50% of space heating, and 65% of water heating in homes, similarly 80% of businesses use natural gas for space and water heating. The industrial sector uses natural gas as a source of process heat, as a fuel for the generation of steam and as a feedstock in the production of petrochemicals and fertilizers. Provincially, Alberta is the largest consumer of natural gas at 3.9 billion cubic feet per day.

In 2018, the government of Canada announced the goal of phasing out the use of coal-fired power stations in favour of less polluting alternatives for electricity generation by 2030. In response, companies such as TransAlta and Capital Power began planning the conversion of their coal-fired power stations to burning natural gas. This transition is expected to increase overall domestic consumption of natural gas.

=== LNG consumption ===
==== Remote communities ====
In Canada there are approximately 188,525 people residing in 265 remote communities with a combined total annual electrical usage of 1,850 GW. The majority of these communities rely on diesel with a total annual fuel consumption of approximately 289 million L. Today, two of Canada's remote communities use natural gas as their primary fuel source.

- Norman Wells, NT purchases excess electricity from a natural gas-fueled power plant operated by Imperial Oil that taps into its field for gas.
- Inuvik, NT has one natural-gas run power plant which until recently was sourced locally from the Ikhil gas well in the Mackenzie Delta. The transition to LNG occurred in 2014 as production ceased in the well. The LNG was initially transported over 3,500 km from the Delta Tillbury plant. Today, Ferus’ Elmworth facility supplies LNG to Inuvik, as well as the city of Whitehorse, which uses natural gas generators.

==== Industries ====
Industrial consumers use LNG to smooth or peak shave the sudden lower/higher demand periods that arise due to extremely cold or warm weather. The Tilbury LNG FortisBC facility currently operates as a peak shaving facility in Western Canada. LNG is also used in heavy drilling, mining machinery operation, and fueling gas-fired electrical generating stations in remote mining locations.

- Caterpillar Inc.: An agreement was announced in 2013 between Caterpillar and Shell Canada to test new LNG hybrid mining trucks in their oil sands mining operations In 2017, Caterpillar Inc. released a dual fuel (LNG-diesel) retrofit kit for their 785C mining truck.
- Teck Resources began a pilot LNG project at their Fording River operation in 2015. Two hauling trucks were converted to dual diesel/LNG engines and LNG was provided by FortisBC.
- Stornoway Diamond Corporation has developed an LNG fueled power plant for the Renard diamond mine in Quebec.

==== Transportation ====
Some Canadian organizations have begun to transition away from diesel and gasoline and towards LNG fuel.

- BC Ferries signed an agreement with FortisBC in 2015 to supply 300,000 GJ of LNG annually to fuel three new passenger ferries equipped with dual fuel capacity (natural gas and diesel). The LNG is transported from the Tilbury facility by truck.
- Seaspan Ferries Corp purchased two hybrid (diesel-LNG-battery) ferries in 2017 to add to its fleet of vessels which deliver cargo from mainland Vancouver to Vancouver Island. LNG for Seaspan Ferries is also supplied by FortisBC's Tilbury facility.
- Vedder Transport of Abbotsford, BC owns a fleet of 65 LNG transport tractors, some of which were purchased from a failed LNG pilot project by Bison Transport. Vedder refuels their fleet using a private station which is supplied with LNG by FortisBC.
- Denwill Enterprises (Burnaby, BC), Sutco Transportation Services (Salmo, BC) and Arrow Transportation Systems (Kamloops, BC), own LNG transportation vehicles in their fleet and are supplied by FortisBC's Tilbury LNG facility
- ENN Canada (a subsidiary of ENN Group) owns three LNG fueling stations in Chilliwack, BC; Merrit, BC and Grande Prairie, AB which service trucking fleets.
- the Canadian National Railway took part in North America's first pilot study using two hybrid (LNG-diesel)powered locomotives from 2012-2013 and in 2015, which transported freight from Edmonton to Fort McMurray. As of 2018, the project has not yet been adopted.

== Trade ==
A large portion of Canada's gas is exported to the United States; in 2006, 9.9 billion cubic feet (280,000,000 m^{3}) per day. In 2018, Canada's annual net exports of natural gas totaled 57.5 billion cubic meters.

=== LNG export and import facilities ===
As of 2018, the Canaport LNG facility in New Brunswick, which opened in 2009, is Canada's only large-scale LNG terminal. The plant functions as a regasification facility. The plant receives LNG from the North Sea and the Caribbean and redistributes it to Atlantic Canada and Northeastern US. According to the International Gas Union's 2017 World LNG Report, Canada received 0.06 and 0.18 metric tonnes per annum (MTPA) from Norway and Trinidad, respectively, in 2016.

Since 2010, the National Energy Board (NEB) has received 48 applications for LNG import/export facilities in Canada. Of those applications, 24 LNG export projects were approved to service the Asian market demand. Canada's first LNG export to China occurred on November 22, 2017 by True North Energy, which transported 17 tonnes of LNG from Fortis BC's Tilbury plant in Vancouver. Because most of Canada's LNG export proposals are greenfield projects, the upfront capital costs are high compared to other international projects. However, small-scale LNG facilities are finding opportunities in Canada's domestic markets.

== Policy ==
=== Alberta Legislation and Public Agencies ===
The public agency governing the energy and electrical distribution in Alberta is the Alberta Utilities Commission (AUC). The AUC is an independent and quasi-judicial agency that regulates transmission lines, electric substations, power generation facilities (i.e. power plants including wind turbines), and gas utility pipelines. According to the AUC Act (SA 2007), the Commission is made up of nine members appointed by the Lieutenant Governor in Council and each hold terms of up to 5 years. In Section 8(5), the Act outlines that the commission may make an order on appeals relating to disputes and are responsible for holding hearings and determining if utility projects are in the public interest. Ultimately, the approval for any LNG plant or project needs approval from the AUC.

Another important statute in Alberta is the Hydro and Electric Energy Act (RSA 2000). Under Section 11 of the Act, the AUC must approve the construction and operation of any LNG plant before production can begin. Section 19 explains that the AUC is responsible for granting or denying approvals, permits, and licenses. Additionally, the commission may demand modifications to the plans, specifications, or locations for LNG plants, before allowing a project to proceed. If the applicant wants to make minor alterations to a power plant, then the corporation must submit a Letter of Enquiry containing the need for the project, timing of construction, and environmental impacts. These provisions are specified in the Hydro and Electric Energy Regulation (409/83) under Section 12.

The Isolated Generating Units and Customer Choice Regulation (165/2003) enables Alberta to govern the provision of energy to areas separate from the interconnected electric system, as well as isolated communities. In Section 2, the regulations clearly state that the owner of the electric distribution system where an isolated community is located must get approval for the pricing and costs associated with providing energy to those communities. In order to develop an LNG fueled power plant in remote communities, utility companies need to follow a robust approval process established by the AUC. During this procedure, the utility companies are required to follow an intensive nine step process involving public consultations, hearings, appeals, and a final decision from the AUC. As part of the process, community support is required before proceeding with energy projects. In the nine step approval process, the first step is public consultation, which involves the applicant addressing concerns from various stakeholders. Next, the utility company is required to make an official application to the AUC. Then, the AUC issues a notice of hearing to any members of the public who wishes to participate in the approval process. The fourth step involves interested parties making submissions or objections to the application. The next step is an opportunity for consultation and negotiation. Shortly after, the AUC holds public hearings and makes the decision to either deny the project, approve it, or put conditions on the approval. The final two steps involve an appeal process for dissatisfied participants and the ultimate construction and operation of the LNG facility.

== See also ==
- List of power stations in Canada by type
- List of countries by natural gas production
- Arctic methane emissions
- History of the petroleum industry in Canada
- Shale gas in Canada
