= Jake Anderson (disambiguation) =

Jake Anderson (born 1980) is an American fishing captain.

Jake Anderson may also refer to:

== Other people ==
- Jake Anderson (basketball) (born 1987), American professional basketball player
- Jake Anderson (rapper) (born 1984), American rapper known as Prof
- Jake Anderson (rugby union) (born 1992), American rugby union player
- Jake Anderson, former member of Carnifex (band)

== Fictional characters ==
- Jake Anderson, fictional character in Must Love Dogs
- Jake Anderson, fictional character in Heartland (Canadian TV series)

== See also ==
- Jacob Anderson (disambiguation)
