= St. Joseph Wind Farm =

Wind farm in Manitoba, Canada

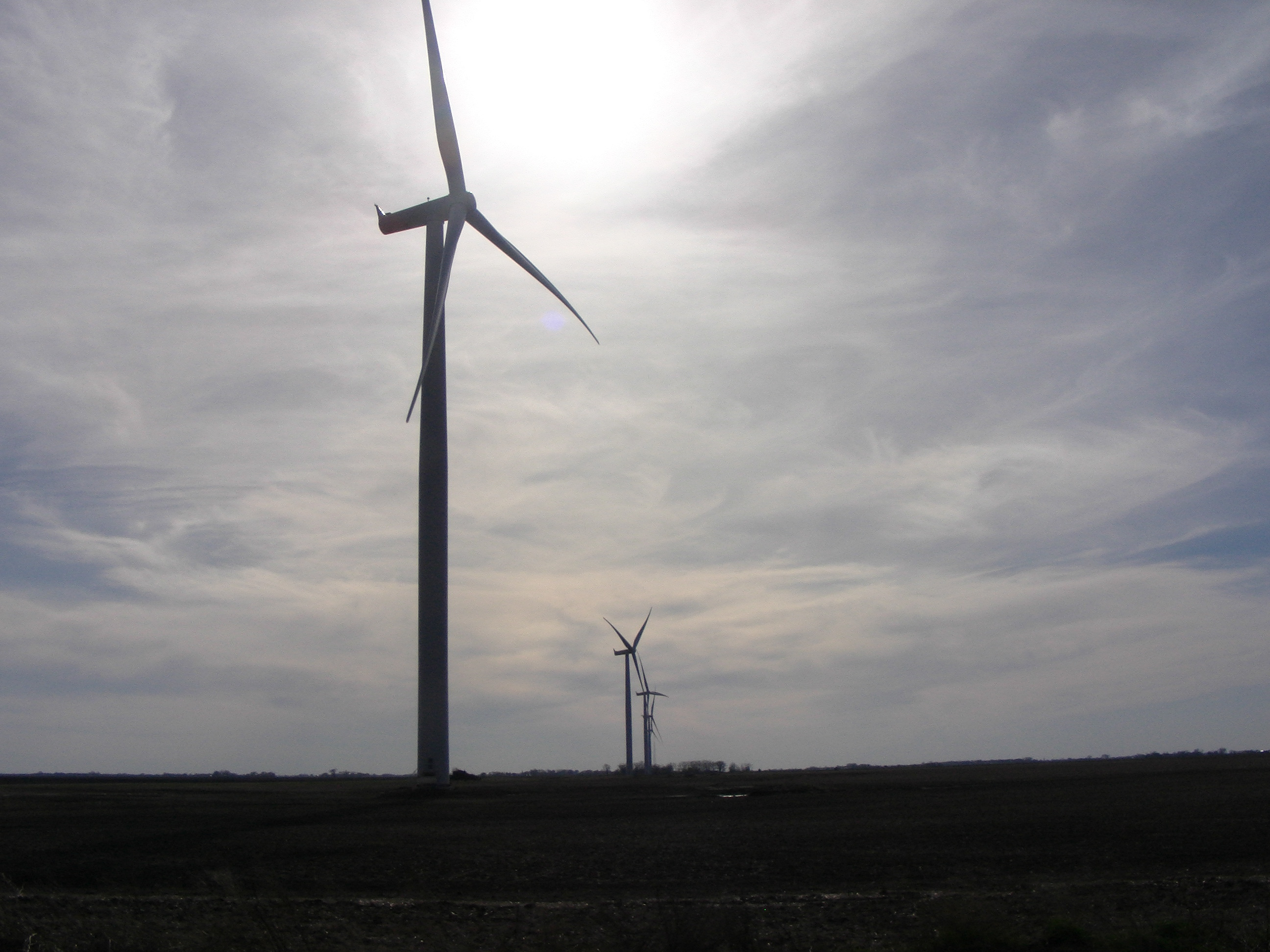
- Wind turbines near St. Joseph Manitoba, visible from Highway 75.
- Location of St. Joseph Wind Farm in Manitoba.
- Country: Canada
- Location: Rural Municipality of Montcalm / Rural Municipality of Rhineland, Manitoba
- Coordinates: 49°07′06″N 97°23′31″W
- Status: Operational
- Commission date: 2011
- Construction cost: C$355 million

Power generation
- Units operational: 60 × 2.3 MW
- Make and model: Siemens Wind Power: SW2.3-101
- Nameplate capacity: 138 MW

St. Joseph Wind Farm (French: Parc éolien de Saint-Joseph) is a wind energy power plant in southern Manitoba, Canada. It has 60 turbines with a total rating of 138 megawatts. First proposed in 2007, the turbines started operation in early 2011. The investment in the plant was C$355 million by the San Francisco-based Pattern Energy Group, with a part loan from Manitoba Hydro. The project had been initially planned at 300 MW capacity but was downsized due to economic conditions in 2008.

The power plant uses 60 Siemens Wind Power 2.3 megawatt turbines, model SW2.3-101; these were the first turbines sold by Siemens in Canada. The plant covers about 125 square kilometres west of Highway 75, around the community of St. Joseph, Manitoba. Energy is sold to Manitoba Hydro through a 27-year purchase agreement. Other communities in the surrounding area include St. Jean-Baptiste, Altona, Dominion City, Emerson, Gretna, Letellier, and Morris.

The site was first planned for 200 GE 1.5 turbines. An addendum to the St. Joseph Environment Act Proposal was filed June 2009. The primary change is the switch from GE 1.5 MW turbines to Siemens 2.3 MW turbines, reducing the number of turbines from 200 to 130 (http://manitobawildlands.org/develop_hydro.htm) Before Siemens was chosen with the turbines Mitsubishi was also a candidate for supplying turbines.

== See also ==
- St. Leon Wind Farm
