= All Saints' Anglican Church, Newtown =

Anglican church in Newtown, Victoria, Australia

All Saints' Anglican Parish Church, Geelong
- All Saints' Church of England Church
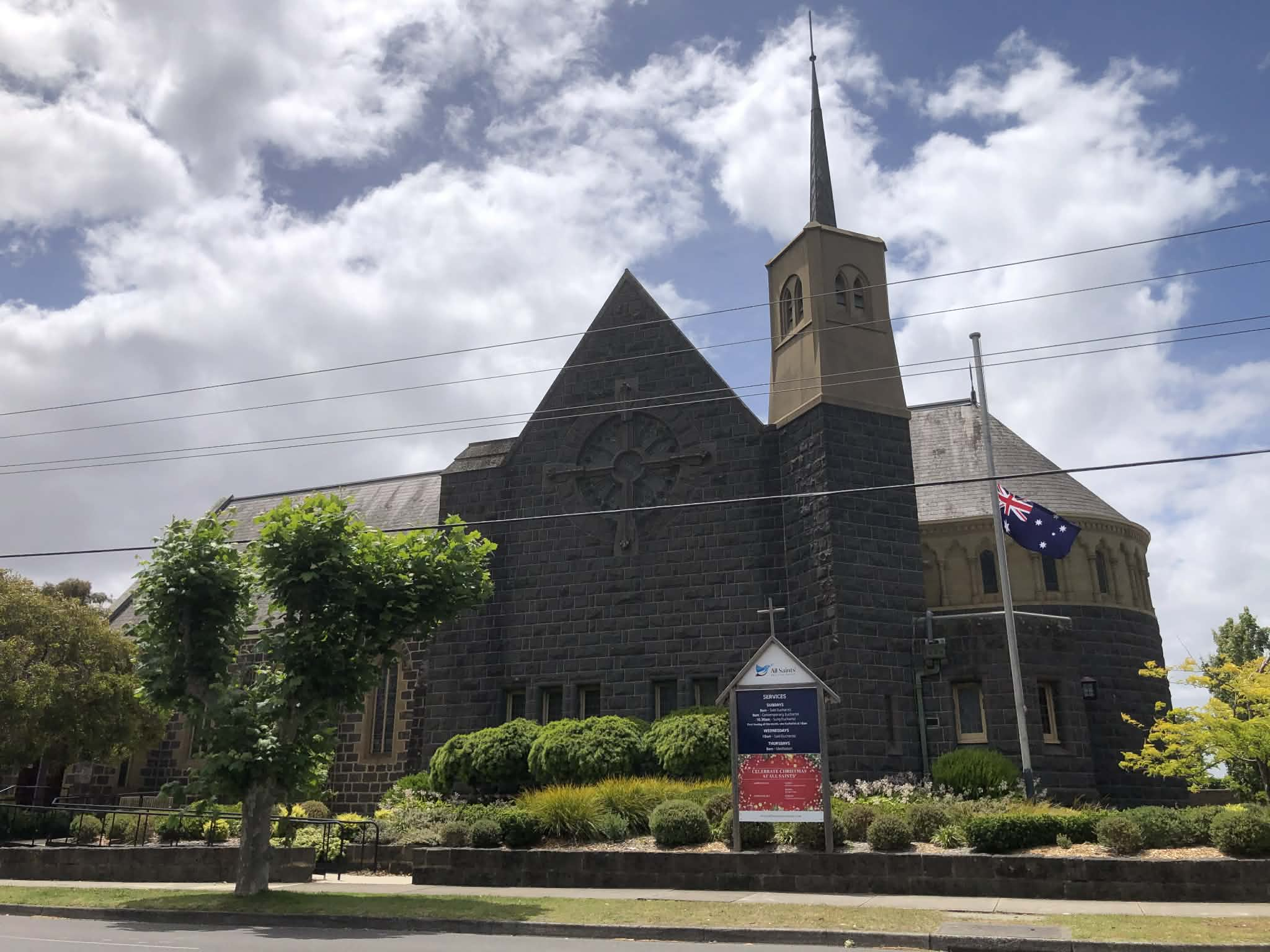
- All Saints' Anglican Parish, December 2025
- All Saints' Anglican Parish Church, Geelong
- 38°09′11″S 144°20′23″E
- Location: 113 Noble Street, Newtown, Victoria
- Country: Australia
- Denomination: Anglican Church of Australia
- Website: allsaintsnewtown.org.au

History
- Status: Active

Architecture
- Architect: Joseph Lowe Shaw
- Style: Early English Gothic
- Years built: 1862-1863 (later additions)
- Completed: 1863

Administration
- Province: Victoria
- Diocese: Melbourne

Clergy
- Vicar: Rev. Stephen Pollard

Victorian Heritage Register
- Official name: All Saints Anglican Church
- Type: Heritage Place
- Designated: October 23, 1975
- Reference no.: H1158
- Heritage Overlay number: HO91

All Saints' Anglican Church is a heritage-listed Anglican parish church situated in the Geelong suburb of Newtown, Victoria, Australia. The church was built in the early English Gothic style, using bluestone with freestone dressing. It has served as a place of Anglican worship since 1863. It is part of the Parish of Newtown & Geelong West, within the Anglican Diocese of Melbourne and remains in active use for religious services and community evenets.

== History ==
Plans for All Saints' Anglican Church were drawn up in 1861, and the foundation stone was laid on 28 June 1862 by Charles Perry, Bishop of Melbourne. The church was designed by Joseph L. Shaw, built of bluestone with freestone dressings, and erected by builders Foyle, Laidlaw and Company. All Saints' was officially opened for divine worship on 8 March 1863, with the Dean of Melbourne, the Reverend Hussey Burgh Macartney, delivering the opening sermon.

In 1918, a new sanctuary was dedicated by the Archbishop of Melbourne, the Most Reverend Henry Lowther Clarke, which was described at the time as one of the "loveliest" features of the church. The south transept, containing the vestry and organ, and the bell tower were added in 1927. The church marked its centenary in 1963 with the laying of the foundation stone for the Chapel of Christ the King on 24 February 1963. The parish later amalgamated with the Geelong West parish in 2004, creating the current Parish of Newtown & Geelong West.

=== All Saints' Peace Memorial Hall (Parish Hall) ===
The church's parish hall, situated across the road on Noble Street, was originally known as "Rosebank" and was built in 1861. It is associated with a timber merchant in the Geelong region known as James Scott, who lived there from its construction until his death. The hall was acquired by the church in 1956, when it was converted into All Saints' Peace Memorial Hall. Architectural elements to note include its unpainted masonry, fanlight, twelve-pane windows and fine masonry mouldings.
