= All Saints Anglican Church (Dominion City, Manitoba) =

Church in Manitoba, Canada

Coordinates: 49.1419°N 97.162°W

General information
- Architectural style: Carpenter Gothic
- Location: Dominion City, Manitoba, Canada
- Construction started: 1879
- Completed: 1879

Technical details
- Structural system: one-storey wood frame

The former All Saints Anglican Church is an historic Carpenter Gothic style Anglican church building located at 48 Centennial Drive, Dominion City, in the Rural Municipality of Franklin in Manitoba, Canada. Built in 1879 as an Episcopal Methodist church with a steep pitched roof and lancet windows, it is a modest example of Carpenter Gothic church style. In 1908, it was bought by the Anglican Parish of Dominion City which moved it to its present location and expanded to include the more elaborate details typical of Carpenter Gothic style Anglican churches.

All Saints is a municipal heritage site (No. M0093) as designated by the rural municipality of Franklin on June 8, 1993. The church closed in the 1960s and in 1985 it was bought by the Franklin Crafts Club. Since 1992 it has been the Franklin Museum.
