= Dominion City =

Community in Manitoba, Canada

- Local urban district
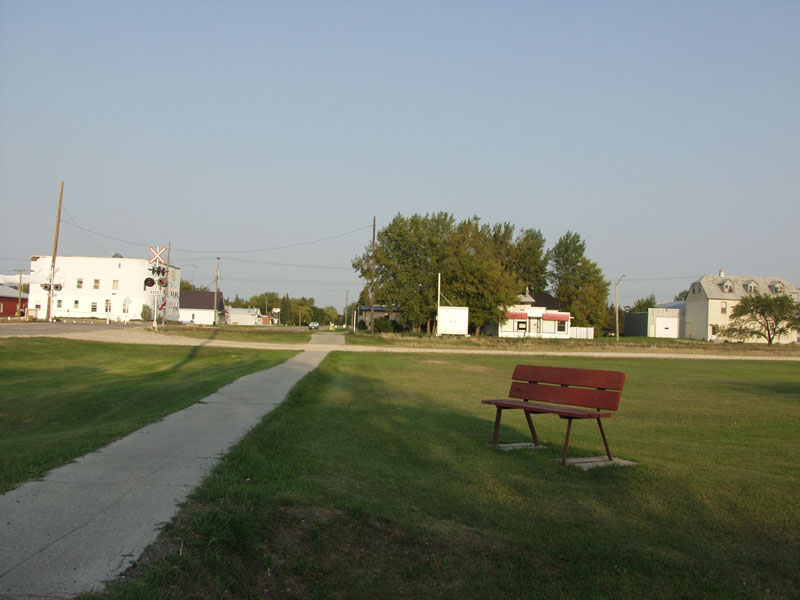
- Dominion City in 2006.

- Location of Dominion City in Manitoba
- Coordinates: 49°08′31″N 97°09′20″W
- Country: Canada
- Province: Manitoba
- Region: Eastman
- Rural Municipality: Emerson-Franklin
- Established: 1874

Government
  - Governing body: Municipality of Emerson-Franklin
  - MP (Provencher): Ted Falk (CPC)
  - MLA (La Verendrye): Konrad Narth (PC)

Area
  - Total: 2.56 km^{2} (0.99 sq mi)

Population
  - Total: 319
  - Density: 124.4/km^{2} (322/sq mi)
- Time zone: UTC-6 (CST)
  - Summer (DST): UTC-5 (CDT)
- Postal Code: R0A 0H0

Dominion City is an unincorporated community in the Municipality of Emerson – Franklin, Manitoba Canada. It is located in southeastern part of the province, approximately 20 kilometres (12 miles) north of the Canada–United States border.

Dominion City is served by Roseau Valley School. The community also has a pool, a museum, a bank, a credit union, a general store, a hockey rink, a curling club, and a nine-hole golf course. Historic buildings in Dominion City include All Saints Anglican Church, which is now used as the Franklin Museum.

The original name of the community was Roseau, later Roseau Crossing. It changed to the current name in 1878 to avoid confusion with similarly-named communities, such as Roseau, Minnesota. The "City" was added in keeping with Crystal City and Rapid City. The post office was called Roseau Crossing upon establishment in 1876 and renamed Dominion City in 1880.

== Demographics ==
In the 2021 Census of Population conducted by Statistics Canada, Dominion City had a population of 319 living in 148 of its 187 total private dwellings, a change of −9.6% from its 2016 population of 353. With a land area of 2.56 km^{2} (0.99 sq mi), it had a population density of 124.6/km^{2} (322.7/sq mi) in 2021.

== Notable people ==
- Jacob Anderson, priest
- Buddy Knox, 1950s rock and roll star
- Julie Masi, musician, member of The Parachute Club
- Denton Mateychuk, NHL player for the Columbus Blue Jackets
