= Jacob Rolsdorph Andersen =

Norwegian judge

Jacob Rolsdorph Andersen (1828–1901) was a Norwegian judge.

He was born in Eidskog Municipality, and graduated as cand.jur. in 1852. He worked as an attorney in Grue Municipality from 1856, assessor in Christiania City Court from 1874 and district stipendiary magistrate of Vinger and Odal District Court from 1880. From 1890 to 1901 he was a Supreme Court Assessor. He died in 1901.
