= Jacob Anderson (priest) =

Jacob Anderson was Archdeacon of Selkirk from 1936 until 1942.

Anderson was born in Lockport, Manitoba in 1875. He began his working life as a teacher. After that he enrolled at St. John's College, Manitoba and was ordained in 1902. After a curacy at Gilbert Plains he held incumbencies in Dominion City, Rathwell, Selkirk and Stonewall.

He died on 26 January 1962.
