= Selkirk Generating Station =

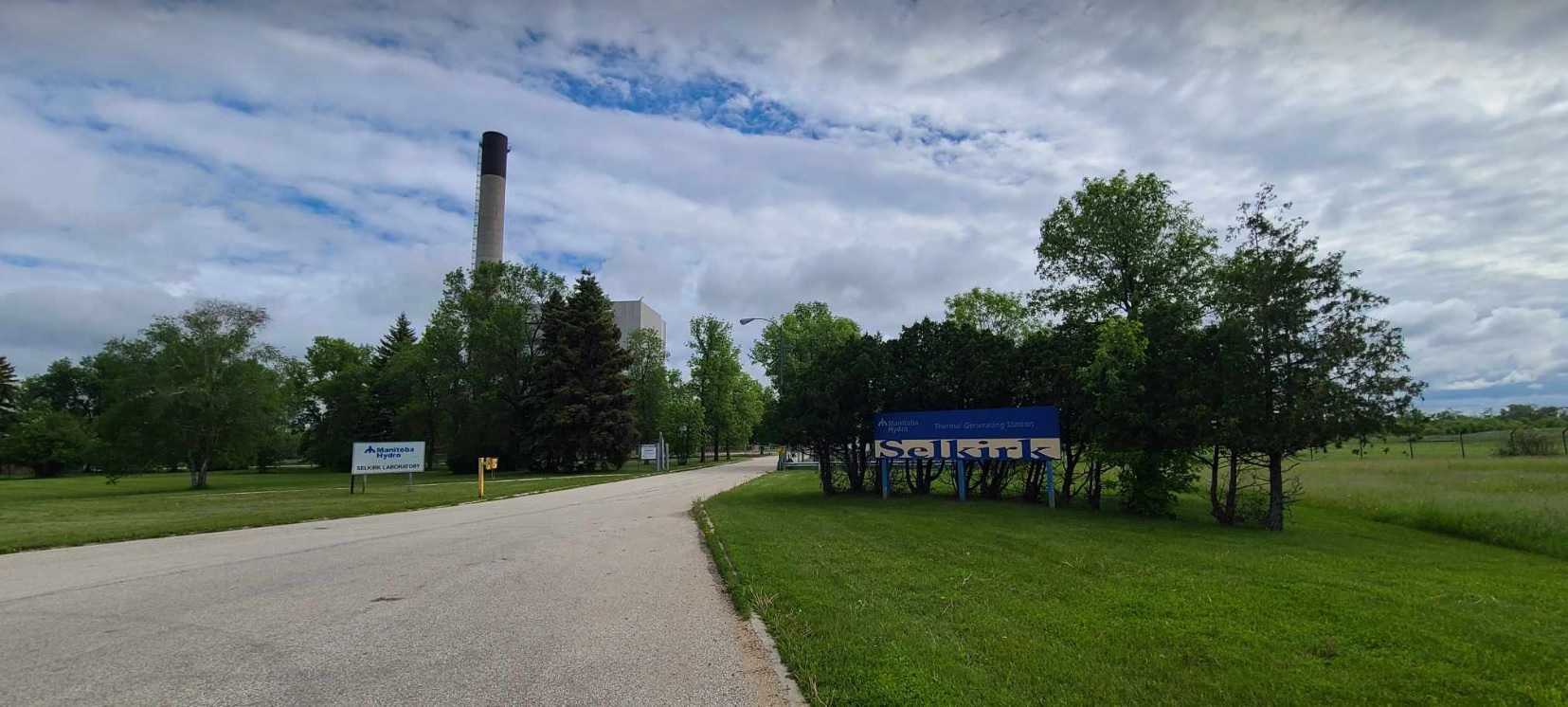
- Country: Canada
- Location: St. Clements, Manitoba
- Coordinates: 50°8′03″N 96°51′05″W
- Status: Decommissioned
- Commission date: 1961
- Decommission date: 2020
- Owner: Manitoba Hydro

Thermal power station
- Primary fuel: Natural gas

Power generation
- Nameplate capacity: 132 MW

Selkirk Generating Station is a natural gas-fired station owned by Manitoba Hydro. It is located just across the Red River from Selkirk, Manitoba, Canada, in the Rural Municipality of St. Clements.

Construction began in 1957, and the station went into commercial service in 1961 with two 66 MW steam turbine-generator units burning lignite coal from Saskatchewan. In 2002 it was converted to burn natural gas, at a cost of $30 million.

The station was decommissioned in 2020.
