= Brandon Generating Station =

- The natural gas-fired power station in 2026
- Country: Canada
- Location: Brandon, Manitoba
- Coordinates: 49°50′43″N 99°53′21″W
- Status: Operational
- Commission date: 1958
- Owner: Manitoba Hydro

Thermal power station
- Primary fuel: Natural gas
- Turbine technology: Steam turbine Gas turbine

Power generation
- Nameplate capacity: 340 MW

Brandon Generating Station is a natural gas-fired power station owned by Manitoba Hydro, located in Brandon, Manitoba, Canada. The station was first built to burn lignite from Saskatchewan.

On 1 January 2010, Unit 5, the sole coal-fired unit, was downgraded to emergency use only, per section 16 of the Manitoba Climate Change and Emissions Reductions Act. Unit 5 was permitted to operate as a generator only under certain circumstances:

- To prevent a situation which would lead to a disruption or destabilization of the power supply.
- In drought years where demand exceeds forecasted supply.
- To maintain the generator in a state of readiness and availability.

The last allowance required Unit 5 to operate for 3–4 days each month at 10–15% of maximum capacity. Unit 5 stopped burning coal on August 1, 2018, and was converted to a synchronous condenser.

== Description ==
The station consists of:

- 4 x 33 MW units (In 1996 three units were retired, and the last retired in 2001)
- 1 x 105 MW coal-fired unit. (Added in 1970, and Converted to Synchronous Condenser operation in 2018)
- 2 x 140 MW Alstom natural gas units (installed in 2002).
