= Jacob Andersson =

Swedish ice hockey player (born 1995)

- Born: March 17, 1995 (age 30) Umeå, Sweden
- Height: 6 ft 0 in (183 cm)
- Weight: 168 lb (76 kg; 12 st 0 lb)
- Position: Defence
- Shoots: Left
- team Former teams: Free agent Skellefteå AIK; Ässät; HKM Zvolen; Frisk Asker; Brûleurs de Loups
- Playing career: 2014–present

Jacob Andersson (born March 17, 1995) is a Swedish professional ice hockey defenceman. He is currently an unrestricted free agent who most recently played with Brûleurs de Loups in the Ligue Magnus.

== Playing career ==
Andersson made his Swedish Hockey League debut playing with Skellefteå AIK during the 2014–15 SHL season.

In the 2021–22 season, Andersson recorded 20 assists through 57 games in the Liiga with Ässät. On 12 May 2022, Andersson was signed for a second stint with Swedish Allsvenskan club, IF Björklöven, agreeing to a two-year contract.
