= Manitoba Hydro =

Electric power and natural gas utility company in Manitoba, Canada

Manitoba Hydro-Electric Board
- Trade name: Manitoba Hydro
- Type: Crown Corporation
- Industry: Electricity generation, transmission and distribution Natural gas distribution
- Founded: 1961
- Headquarters: Winnipeg, Manitoba, Canada
- Area served: Manitoba
- Key people: Hal Turner, President & CEO (interim)
- Products: Electricity, Natural gas
- Revenue: $C 3.065 billion (FY 2023)
- Net income: $C 590 million (FY 2023)
- Total assets: $C 31.410 billion (FY 2023)
- Total equity: $C 3.689 billion (FY 2023)
- Owner: Province of Manitoba
- Number of employees: 5,143 (FY 2023)
- Website: www.hydro.mb.ca

The Manitoba Hydro-Electric Board, operating as Manitoba Hydro, is the electric power and natural gas utility in the province of Manitoba, Canada. Founded in 1961, it is a provincial Crown Corporation, governed by the Manitoba Hydro-Electric Board and the Manitoba Hydro Act. Today the company operates 16 interconnected generating stations. It has more than 527,000 electric power customers and more than 263,000 natural gas customers. Since most of the electrical energy is provided by hydroelectric power, the utility has low electricity rates. Stations in Northern Manitoba are connected by a HVDC system, the Nelson River Bipole, to customers in the south. The internal staff are members of the Canadian Union of Public Employees Local 998 while the outside workers are members of the International Brotherhood of Electrical Workers Local 2034.

Manitoba Hydro headquarters in the downtown Winnipeg Manitoba Hydro Place officially opened in 2009.

== Abbreviated history ==
=== 1873–1960: electric power before Manitoba Hydro ===
The first recorded attempt to extract useful work from a Manitoba river was in 1829 at a flour mill (known as Grant's Mill) located on Sturgeon Creek in what is now Winnipeg. This was not successful and the milling equipment was later operated by a windmill.

The first public electric lighting installation in Manitoba was demonstrated at the Davis House hotel on Main Street, Winnipeg, March 12, 1873. In 1880, the Manitoba Electric and Gas Light Company was incorporated to provide public lighting and power, and a year later absorbed the Winnipeg Gas Company. In 1893, the Winnipeg Electric Street Railway Company was formed, and initially purchased power from Manitoba Electric and Gas, but by 1898, it had built its own 1000-horsepower (750 kW) generating plant and purchased Manitoba Electric and Gas.

The first hydroelectric plant in Manitoba operated north of Brandon from 1901 to 1924. Private investors built a 261-foot (80 m) earth-fill dam across the Minnedosa River (now known as the Little Saskatchewan River) about a kilometer from its junction with the Assiniboine River. The plant only operated part of the year, with the load carried in the winter months by steam generators. An 11-kV wood-pole transmission line connected the station with the town of Brandon, Manitoba. The dam washed out in 1948 but remains are still visible. A second plant was built by private investors near Minnedosa in 1912 but low water levels meant that it only operated intermittently. In 1920 the plant was replaced by a diesel station owned by the Manitoba Power Commission. The dam still exists today at Minnedosa Lake.

By 1906, Winnipeg Electric Street Railway had constructed a hydroelectric plant on the Winnipeg River near Pinawa, and seventy miles (110 km) of 60-kV transmission line. This plant operated year-round until 1951, when it was shut down to allow improved water flow to other Winnipeg River stations. Its remains are still preserved as a provincial park.

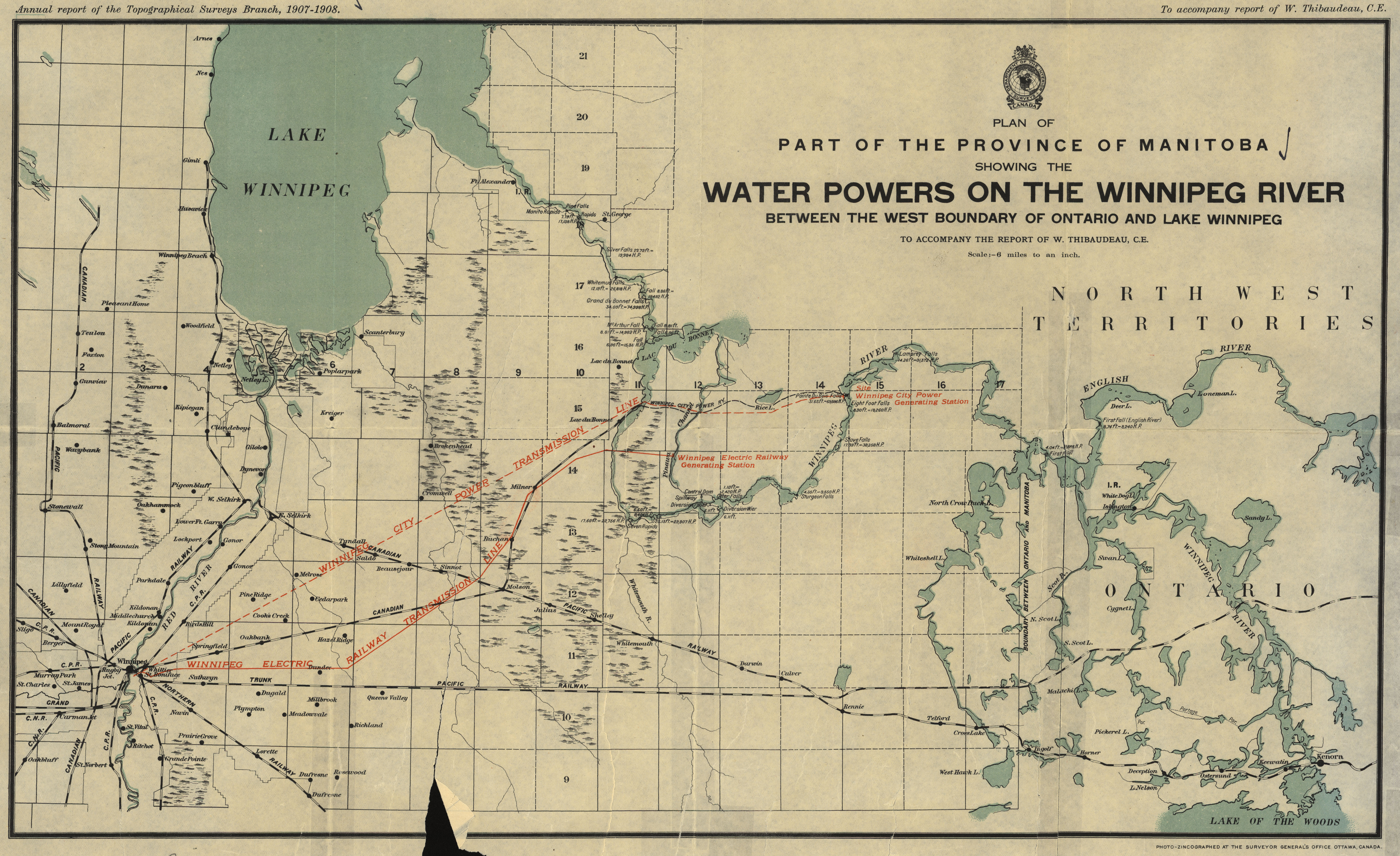
Early development on the Winnipeg River as of 1908.

Since the investor-owned Winnipeg Electric Street Railway was charging twenty cents per kilowatt-hour, the City of Winnipeg founded its own utility in 1906,. Winnipeg city alderman John Wesley Cockburn (January 9, 1856 – November 9, 1924) had privately secured water rights for a development on the river. With these water rights, the City developed a generating station at Pointe du Bois on the Winnipeg River (which was completed in 1911 and which still operates early in the 21st century). In reaction to this, Winnipeg Electric Street Railway dropped prices to ten cents per kilowatt-hour, but the City-owned utility (Winnipeg Hydro) set a price of 3.5 cents per kilowatt-hour which held for many decades.

In 1916, the Province established the Manitoba Power Commission with the object of bringing electric power to communities outside of Winnipeg.

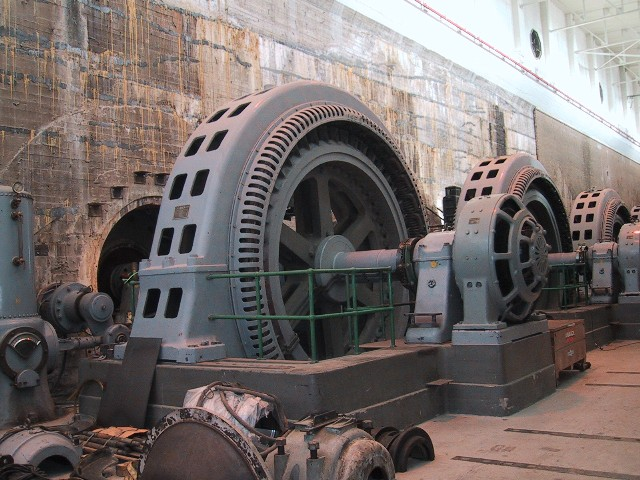
Pointe du Bois Generating Station on the Winnipeg River

Winnipeg Hydro, Winnipeg Electric Street Railway Company and the Manitoba Hydro Commission all built extensive hydroelectric generating facilities on the Winnipeg River during the period 1916 through 1928. The Great Depression starting in 1929 put an end to rapid growth until after World War II. The City of Winnipeg utility built coal-fired steam generators in 1924 on Amy Street, which were also used for district heating of downtown buildings. During World War Two, electric boilers at Amy Street used surplus hydroelectric power to economize on coal consumption. The City utility also implemented load management on electric water heaters, which allowed them to be turned off during the day and during peak load periods.

In 1949 the Province set up a new utility, the Manitoba Hydro Electric Board (MHEB). In 1953 the MHEB acquired the assets of the Winnipeg Electric Street Railway. The MHEB was tasked with bringing electric power to the rural parts of Manitoba, a task which took until around 1956 to substantially complete.

By 1955 there were three utilities in the province:

- Manitoba Power Commission (Provincial Government)
- Manitoba Hydro Electric Board (Provincial Government)
- Winnipeg Hydro Electric System (City of Winnipeg government).

Two thermal (coal-fired) stations were built at Brandon and Selkirk starting in 1958. These units were intended to operate during low-water years, and burned lignite coal.

In 1957, the first transmission line between Manitoba and North-West Ontario was installed. In 1960, a 138-kV connection to Saskatchewan Power Corporation was completed, and it was later uprated to 230 kV.

=== 1961 to date: the Manitoba Hydro era ===
The Manitoba Power Commission and Manitoba Hydro Electric Board merged in 1961 to form Manitoba Hydro. One of the earlier wholesale accounts to be transferred to Manitoba Hydro in 1956 was the village of Emerson, which had been served up to that point by a cross-border tie to the Otter Tail Power system at Noyes. The last of the private mine-owned utility systems at Flin Flon was purchased by Manitoba Hydro in 1973. The early 1970s also marked the installation of tie lines between Manitoba Hydro and utilities in Ontario, Saskatchewan and Minnesota. The interconnection with the American utilities (Otter Tail Power, Northern States Power, and Minkota Power Cooperative) were used to obtain firm power of 90 MW for the winter of 1970; and since that time these interconnections have also been used for export of energy.

In the period 1974 to 1976, Manitoba Hydro was still studying nuclear power, but it concluded that all hydraulic resources should be developed first before construction of any nuclear facility. Although a research nuclear reactor existed at the Pinawa AECL research facility, no nuclear generating capacity has ever been constructed in Manitoba.

In 1980, the Dorsey-Forbes-Chisago 500,000 volt transmission line interconnecting Manitoba Hydro with Northern States Power in Minnesota was put in service.

In July 1999, Manitoba Hydro purchased the natural gas distribution company Centra Gas Manitoba. In September 2002, Manitoba Hydro purchased Winnipeg Hydro, which formerly provided electric power in the downtown area of Winnipeg.

=== Nelson River development ===
The water power potential of the Nelson River was described as early as 1911, when over 6 million horsepower of potential generation capacity was identified at 11 sites – at a time when the developed hydropower in the rest of Canada was around 1 million horsepower. Between 1955 and 1960, studies were carried out to determine what resources would be available for future hydraulic generation. The stations at Kelsey, Kettle, Long Spruce and Limestone were built on the lower Nelson River to support both Manitoba load growth and export plans. Limestone, the largest generating station in Manitoba, is located on the Lower Nelson only 90 km from Hudson Bay. Long-term firm power sales contracts were signed with Northern States Power. Control dams have turned Lake Winnipeg, the 12th largest lake in the world, into a 25,000 km^{2} reservoir for the Nelson River generation system.

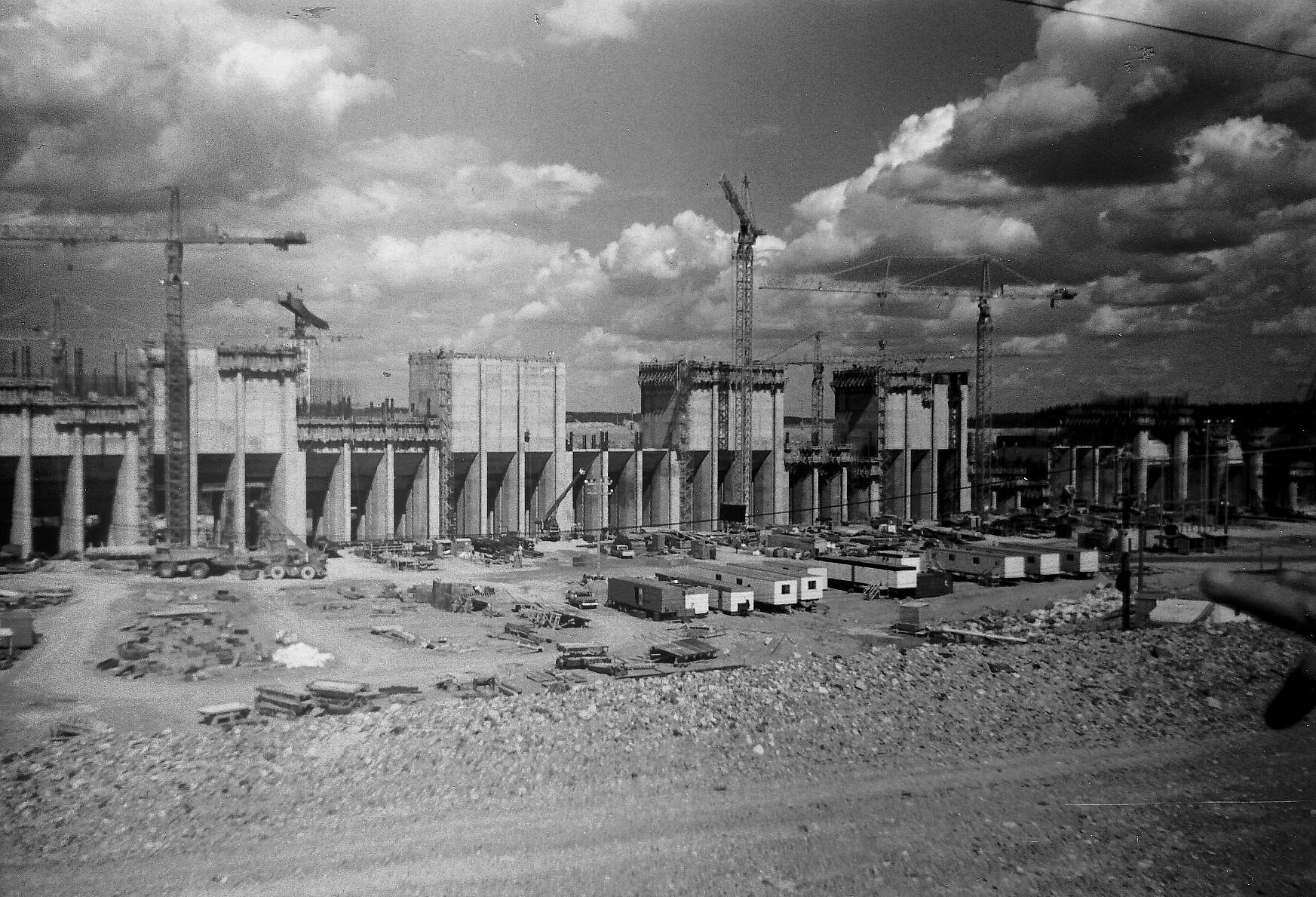
Manitoba Hydro Limestone Generating Station during construction, about 1987.

The great distance between generating sites on the Nelson River and load centers in southern Manitoba required the use of HVDC transmission lines to bring the energy to market. When these lines were commissioned, they were the longest and highest-voltage direct current lines in the world. The Dorsey converter station is 26 km north-west of the center of Winnipeg.

=== Wind development ===
Starting in 2005, a wind farm was built near St. Leon, Manitoba. Power generated by this privately constructed plant is purchased by Manitoba Hydro for distribution on its network. The capacity of this installation is 99.9 MW, comprising 63 wind turbines of 1.65 MW each. This is the first privately owned grid-connected generation to be constructed in Manitoba in nearly fifty years. Energy produced by this facility is subsidized by the Canadian Government's Wind Power Production Incentive, though over the life of the project tax revenue will exceed the value of the initial subsidy.

The 138 megawatt St. Joseph Wind Farm began operation in 2011.

Multiple wind farm sites with capacities between 50 and 200 MW have been studied for Manitoba. The Manitoba OASIS node has generator interconnection evaluation studies for wind farms at Elie, Lena, Darlingford, Boissevain, Killarney, and Minnedosa. Additional probable wind farm sites of up to 200 MW are in the generation queue on the OASIS for St. Leon, St. Laurent, Letellier, Waskada, Alexander, Lizard Lake, Lk. Manitoba Narrows and other locations.

=== Winnipeg Hydro ===
Winnipeg Hydro is a former provider of electrical power for the city of Winnipeg, Manitoba. Winnipeg Hydro was established in 1906 and was purchased by Manitoba Hydro in 2002.

In 1906, voters approved a $3.25 million expenditure for development of a hydroelectric plan at Pointe du Bois. Immediately following the decision to build the Pointe du Bois plant, the price of electricity charged by the private sector in Winnipeg dropped from 20 cents per kilowatt-hour to 10 cents and subsequently to 7 1/2 cents. After completion of the plant in 1911, Winnipeg Hydro set its rate at 3 1/3 cents per kilowatt-hour. This rate remained unchanged until 1973. Customers of Winnipeg Hydro enjoyed among the lowest electricity rates in North America.

In September 2002, Winnipeg Hydro officially closed its doors embarking on a new era as part of Manitoba Hydro.

== Manitoba Hydro Act ==
The Manitoba Hydro Act governs Manitoba Hydro. The purpose of the Manitoba Hydro Act was to provide for efficient, economical supply of electric power for the needs of the province. The first version of the act was effective March 31, 1961 and it has been revised since that date. Notably, the Act now carries a provision prohibiting privatization of Manitoba Hydro without a public referendum.

Since 1970, a Minister responsible for the Manitoba Hydro Act has sat on Executive Council of Manitoba. This position is not a full departmental portfolio in the Manitoba executive council, and it is generally held by ministers who also hold other cabinet responsibilities.

List of Ministers responsible for the Manitoba Hydro Act
Edward Schreyer	(NDP)	September 8, 1970 – January 28, 1974
Donald Craik	(PC)	October 24, 1977 – January 16, 1981
Wilson Parasiuk	(NDP)	November 30, 1981 – May 20, 1986
Victor Schroeder	(NDP)	May 20, 1986 – October 29, 1986
Wilson Parasiuk	(NDP)	October 29, 1986 – September 21, 1987
Jerry Storie	(NDP)	September 21, 1987 – May 9, 1988
Harold Neufeld	(PC)	May 9, 1988 – January 14, 1992
James Downey	(PC)	January 14, 1992 – September 10, 1993
Donald Orchard	(PC)	September 10, 1993 – March 20, 1995
David Newman	(PC)	January 6, 1997 – October 5, 1999
Greg Selinger	(NDP)	October 5, 1999 – September 25, 2002
Tim Sale	(NDP)	September 25, 2002 – October 12, 2004
Dave Chomiak	(NDP)	October 12, 2004 – September 21, 2006
Greg Selinger	(NDP)	September 21, 2006 – September 8, 2009
Dave Chomiak	(NDP)	January 13, 2012 – October 18, 2013
Stan Struthers	(NDP)	October 18, 2013 – November 3, 2014
Eric Robinson	(NDP)	April 2015 - May 3, 2016
Ron Schuler	(PC)	May 3, 2016 – August 17, 2017
Cliff Cullen	(PC)	August 17, 2017 – August 1, 2018
Colleen Mayer	(PC)	August 1, 2018 – September 25, 2019
Jeff Wharton	(PC)	September 25, 2019 – January 18, 2022
Cameron Friesen	(PC)	January 18, 2022 – January 30, 2023
Cliff Cullen	(PC)	January 30, 2023 – October 18, 2023
Adrien Sala	(NDP)	October 18, 2023 – Present

== Generating stations ==
Station	Started	Location	Units	Power per unit (MW)	Total power (MW)	Average annual generation (TW·h)	Remarks
Pointe du Bois	1911	Winnipeg R.	16	various	78	0.6	Ex–Winnipeg Hydro, 8.4 MW Straflo installed 1999, 14 m head, replacement planned
Great Falls	1922	Winnipeg R.	6	various	131	0.75	Ex–Winnipeg Electric Railway Co., 17.7 m head, 883 m^{3}/s each unit
Seven Sisters	1931	Winnipeg R.	6	25	165	0.99	18.6 m head, 1,146 m^{3}/s
Slave Falls	1931	Winnipeg R.	8	8	67	0.52	Ex–Winnipeg Hydro
Laurie River 1	1952	Laurie R.	1	5	5	0.03	Ex–Sherrit Gordon, 16.8 m head
Pine Falls	1952	Winnipeg R.	6	14	82	0.62	11.3 m head, 917 m^{3}/s
McArthur Falls	1954	Winnipeg R.	8	7	56	0.38	7 m head, 966 m^{3}/s
Kelsey	1957	Nelson R.	7	30	211	1.8	Ex-INCO, 17.1 m head, station 1,713 m^{3}/s
Laurie River 2	1958	Laurie R.	2	2.5	5	0.03	As for LR 1
Brandon (steam)	1958	Brandon	1	105	105	0.6 (Note: Typical peaking only)	Unit 5, sub-bituminous coal, emergency use only
Selkirk (steam)	1958	Selkirk	2	60	121	0.3	Natural gas since 2002
Grand Rapids	1965	Saskatchewan R.	4	120	472	1.54	First station built under Manitoba Hydro name, frequency control for Manitoba, 36.6 m head, 1500 m^{3}/s per unit
Kettle	1970	Nelson R.	12	103	1,220	7.1	30 m head, 370 m^{3}/s each unit
Long Spruce	1977	Nelson R.	10	100	1,010	5.8	26 m head, 4,580 m^{3}/s
Jenpeg	1979	Nelson R.	6	16	97	0.9	USSR Bulb Turbines
Limestone	1990	Nelson R.	10	135	1,340	7.7	5,100 m^{3}/s total
Wuskwatim Generating Station	2012	Burntwood River	3	66	200	1.5	First power was June 2012, station design discharge 1100 cubic metres per second, design head 21.4 m summer
Brandon (combustion turbine)	2002	Brandon	2	130	260	0.05	Units 6 & 7, natural gas/diesel backup simple cycle
Diesel Plants	-	Brochet, Lac Brochet, Tadoule Lake, Shamattawa	12	various	4	0.01	Diesel fuel, not on grid

Generating station total ratings are approximate. Water flow conditions and station service load may account for some of the difference between rated station output and total unit nameplate rating. In a typical year the hydroelectric plants produce more than ninety-five percent of the energy sold.

== Transmission ==
=== AC system ===
Manitoba Hydro operates an extensive network of more than 9000 km of ac transmission lines. Transmission voltages in use include:

- 66 kV
- 115 kV
- 138 kV
- 230 kV
- 500 kV

Distribution voltages include 4160 V especially in urban Winnipeg, 12.47 kV and 25 kV, usually on overhead conductors but often in buried cables. Total length of distribution lines is over 80,000 km.

Transmission lines built in Manitoba must withstand a wide temperature range, ice, and occasional high winds. In 1997, a tornado blew down 19 transmission towers of the HVDC system north of Winnipeg, reducing transmission capacity from the North to a small fraction of system capacity. During the several days required for utility employees to repair this line, power was imported from the United States over the 500 kV interconnection. As a consequence, though some major industrial customers were requested to curtail energy use, disruption for most customers remained small.

=== DC system ===
Map of current Bipole I & II lines

A large portion of the energy generated on the Nelson river is transmitted south on the HVDC Nelson River Bipole system. The two transmission lines BIPOLE I and BIPOLE II, each nearly 900 km long, operate at ± 450 kV and ± 500 kV DC, with converter stations at Gillam and Sundance, and the inverter station, Dorsey, near Rosser. The combined capacity of the two HVDC lines is 3420 MW, or about 68% of the total generation capacity in the province. A third HVDC line, BIPOLE III was completed July 4, 2018. At a cost of $4.7B, it carries 2000 MW capacity over 3076 towers and 1384 km. Two new converter stations were built at Keewatinohk on the Nelson River and at Riel east of Winnipeg. A different route from northern Manitoba was chosen for BIPOLE III in order to provide safety and redundancy in case BIPOLE I and II which run side by side for much of the route and end at the same converter station were simultaneously damaged.

=== Exports ===
Manitoba Hydro has transmission lines connecting with Saskatchewan, Ontario, North Dakota and Minnesota. Ties to the Canadian provinces are of low capacity but a substantial portion of Manitoba Hydro's annual generation can be exported over the tie to Minnesota. In 2003, a new line was completed to the United States (the Harvey-Glenboro 230kV line), allowing a firm export capacity of 700 megawatts. In 2005 Manitoba Hydro announced increased interchange up to 500 MW with Ontario, after construction of additional transmission facilities. Manitoba Hydro's largest interconnection is the Dorsey-Forbes-Chisago 500,000 volt (AC) line that begins at the Dorsey substation located in Rosser near Winnipeg and travels south into the United States and takes a southeasterly direction to the Forbes Substation northwest of Duluth, Minnesota and from there goes south to the Chisago substation located just north of St. Paul, Minnesota.

Manitoba Hydro also participates in "border accommodation" transfers, where it provides power to isolated extraprovincial end-use loads such as those of the Northwest Angle in Minnesota.

Manitoba Hydro is a member of the MRO Midwest Reliability Organization, a region of the North American Electrical Reliability Council NERC and successor to MAPP (Mid-continent Area Power Pool) since June 15, 2004. Manitoba Hydro continues its membership in MAPP, which retains its function as a generation reserves sharing pool.

Export of electrical energy has been regulated since 1907 in Canada. Since 1959, the National Energy Board licences exports, based on the criteria that the exports are surplus to domestic need and that the price charged is reasonable and in the Canadian public interest. Similarly, exporters of power from the United States into Canada require a United States Export Authorization.

=== Natural gas customers ===
Manitoba Hydro has about 238,000 residential, and 24,700 commercial and industrial customers. In fiscal 2008 total gas revenues were $580 million CAD on 2,165 million cubic metres of gas. Residential consumers account for about 48% of Manitoba gas consumption.

== Recent and current projects ==
Manitoba Hydro has a capital spending program intended to maintain and extend capacity for Manitoba customers, for environmental protection, and to allow export of energy surplus to Manitoba needs to stabilize rates. Some of these projects include:

- Power Smart: Manitoba Hydro has operated a Power Smart program since 1991. This project identifies energy conservation and efficiency opportunities for residential, commercial and industrial customers. Measures such as high-efficiency electric motors and improved lighting have offset 292 MW of peak load growth and up to 631 million kW·h per year of energy consumption. In 2005 Manitoba Hydro announced goals of doubling Power Smart capacity savings to 842 MW and 2.6 terawatt-hours by 2018.
- INROCS (Interlake Nelson River Optical Cable System) is the replacement of the former microwave links for control of northern generation and transmission with a buried fiber optic cable system. More than 1140 km of cable were buried between the system control center in Winnipeg, to the present northernmost stations near Gillam.
- Brandon Combustion Turbines: In 2003, Manitoba Hydro commissioned two simple-cycle gas turbine generating units at the existing plant in Brandon. These natural gas-fuelled units are intended to provide peaking power and supplemental capacity in case of low water levels.
- Selkirk Natural Gas Conversion: In 2003, the fuel supply of the Selkirk steam boilers was converted to natural gas. While this is a more expensive fuel than the coal previously used at this plant, it allows the life of the station to be extended without the capital cost required to clean coal emissions up to current standards.
- Wind Energy Survey: While Manitoba Hydro is in the process of completing a wind energy survey at five locations, private developers have completed wind farms at St. Leon and St. Joseph, and will sell all power generated to Manitoba Hydro. Manitoba Hydro has not announced an in-service date for additional utility-owned wind generation.
- New Hydraulic Generation (Keeyask, Conawapa, Notigi) and HVDC Transmission (): Studies are continuing to permit eventual construction of new generating projects along the Nelson River. The Keeyask station (formerly known as Gull) would have a capacity of approximately 695 megawatts and started construction in 2014. Expected completion of the station will be in 2019. In February 2009 the Tataskweyak Cree Nation community voted in favor of participation in the project. The 1380 megawatt Conawapa project was initiated but postponed indefinitely in 1992 when Ontario Hydro elected not to purchase firm energy from Manitoba. Planning activities for Conawapa were suspended in 2014 and no environmental hearings are currently scheduled. The potential generating station at Notigi would produce approximately 100 megawatts, and would create no new flooding, but no in-service date has been set for this project, and no plans are in progress to build the station at this time.
- Pointe du Bois replacement: In 2007 Manitoba Hydro announced plans to replace the 90-year-old Point du Bois plant with a new $800 million (Canadian) generating project at the same site, with greater output, reliability, and efficiency.

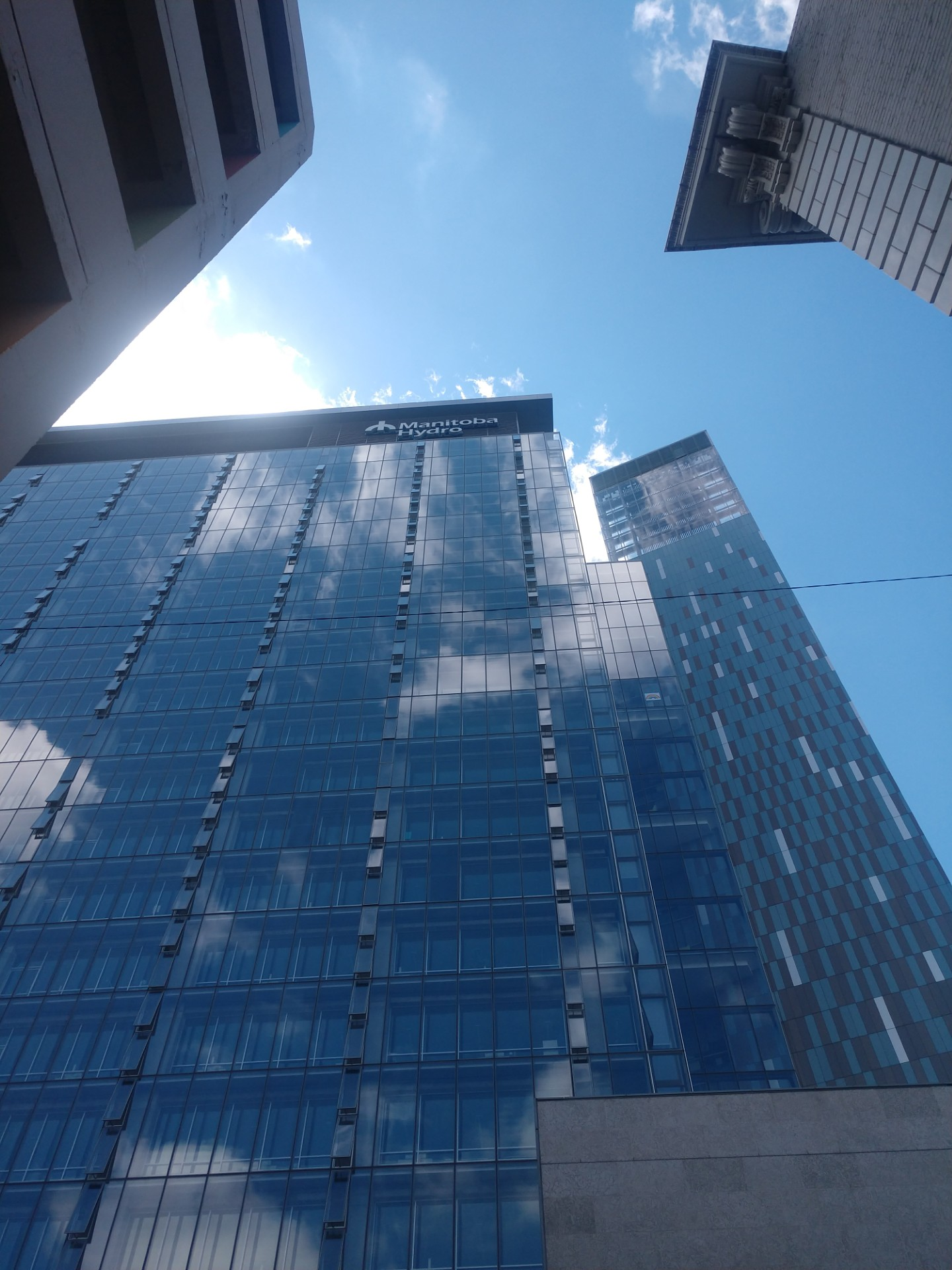
Manitoba Hydro Place

- In September 2009, the company completed its headquarters building, the Manitoba Hydro Tower on Portage Avenue. About 1650 Hydro employees work in this building. It is the 5th tallest building in the city at 112.5 metres to the top of solar chimney with a total of 22 stories and 690,000 square feet (64,000 square metres) floor space. The building is intended to be one of the most energy-efficient building of its size in North America, and to consume 60% less energy than the national building code requirements.

=== Wuskwatim generating station ===
Wuskwatim generating station is on the Burntwood River near Thompson. The general civil works contract was awarded in 2008, and first power from the project occurred in June 2012. The plant was officially opened on July 5, 2012, while construction of the remaining two units continued.

This 200 MW station has three hydraulic turbine generator units, causes less than one half square kilometre of new flooding, and has only a small reservoir. This project had the most extensive environmental review of any generating project in Manitoba. Participation of the Nisichawayasihk Cree Nation (NCN) First Nation was passed by a June 2006 referendum by NCN members. This partnership between NCN and Manitoba Hydro will allow advancement of the in-service date to 2012 and opportunities for additional export revenue. Otherwise the domestic load growth would not require this new capacity until several years later.

Excavation and primary concrete for the dam, powerhouse and spillway was mainly completed by June 2009. The spillway gate hoist housing had been erected and the river closure and diversion occurred in July 2009. Construction required an access road and construction camp site, and a construction power substation, along with services such as water supply and sewage lagoons for the camp. A new 230 kV gas-insulated substation was constructed adjacent to the dam site, which will distribute power from the Wuskwatim generators to the transmission network. A cofferdam was constructed for excavation of the tailrace and spillway channel, and subsequently removed. Secondary concrete and turbine installation continued through the summer and fall of 2010. The construction camp population varies according to activity level but as of July 2010 there were 635 workers in the construction camp.

=== Potential future projects ===
More than 5000 MW of hydroelectric potential could be developed in Manitoba, which includes 1380 MW at the Conawapa site, 695 MW at the Keeyask site, and 1000 MW at the Gillam Island site, all on the lower Nelson river. Other sites have been assessed but are not currently under study for development. All of these developments would require a large increase in electric power exports, since Manitoba load growth will not require this capacity for a generation or more. All of these projects require additional HVDC transmission capacity from the North to the South. One such project, Bipole III, has been discussed with communities on the east side of Lake Winnipeg, but this area is ecologically and culturally sensitive and power line construction will require extensive environmental impact assessment.

== Controversies and issues ==
Like any other large-scale activity, the operations of Manitoba Hydro have not been without controversy.

- In 1976, the Churchill River diversion project was set into operation. Flow was diverted by a series of channels and control structures into the Nelson River. The effects of this diversion on pre-existing water levels and the indigenous Cree and Métis people continue to be felt to this day. Negotiations between the affected Northern communities and Manitoba Hydro continue, to discuss mitigation measures and compensation for loss of traditional resource areas and sites.
- The water level of Lake Winnipeg is now regulated by Manitoba Hydro as part of the energy generation operations. Some property owners on the southern edge of the lake feel that the levels are now maintained at a higher average level than would be natural, and attribute erosion of their property to the lake level. Manitoba Hydro has pointed out that the regulation project also allows lake level to be lowered, such as during the 1997 floods, thereby preventing significant property damage.
- Residents of the area around the Selkirk steam plant attributed various environmental damage to the continued operation of this plant, which at the time was fuelled by coal. Manitoba Hydro has converted this plant to natural gas, which, while a more expensive and faster-depleting energy source than coal, burns with lower emissions of heavy metals, sulfur dioxide, and carbon dioxide.
- The Province of Manitoba charges Manitoba Hydro a water rental fee proportionate to the total volume of water passed through the generating stations. Increases in this rental have provided an important stream of non-tax revenue to the Provincial government. While at first glance it may seem superfluous for the provincial government to collect such fees from a company it owns, the government argues that such fees help ensure that Manitobans receive a direct return on that portion of energy resources that is exported. More controversially, in 2002–2004 the New Democratic Party provincial government collected a direct dividend from Manitoba Hydro. This was criticized by the provincial opposition parties for various reasons but mostly as evidence that Hydro rates were unnecessarily high with the excess amounting to a hidden tax.
- Manitoba Hydro has studied new HVDC transmission lines to run along the east side of Lake Winnipeg. The additional transmission capacity would be required to develop stations at Keeyask and Conawapa. This plan would offset the concentration of transmission lines in the Interlake area (west of Lake Winnipeg and east of Lake Manitoba), and would provide additional security against transmission failures due to adverse weather or other causes. However, this area has no roads and very little development. Some environmentalists argue that this vast area of boreal forest should not be crossed by a transmission corridor. If roads were built at the same time as the lines, these roads would allow year-round access to small First Nation communities east of the lake; some people feel this would have more adverse than beneficial effects for these communities. From an engineering perspective, there is no connection between building a new transmission line east of Lake Winnipeg, and building a road east of the lake. In May 2005, the provincial government announced that it would not consider any route along the east side of Lake Winnipeg, even though the alternative routes through the Interlake region or west of Lake Manitoba would extend the transmission lines, and increase cost. The western route was chosen by the government to protect the proposed UNESCO biosphere reserve on the east side by local First Nations reserves called Pimachiowin Aki. This decision was criticized by 19 former senior Manitoba Hydro engineers, who were in favour of the East side route.
- A transmission line down the west side of the province could also have adverse environmental effects: several caribou herds use the area near The Pas, several ecological reserves occur on the west side of the province (Lake Winnipegosis Salt Flats, Birch River), as well as UNESCO's Riding Mountain Biosphere Reserve, three provincial parks (Duck Mountain, Clearwater and Kettle Stones), one Park Reserve (Walter Cook Caves), one Provincial Forest (Porcupine Hills), and two Wildlife Management Areas (Tom Lamb WMA and Saskeram WMA).

=== Tritschler commission inquiry of 1979 ===
Concerns about the economy and efficiency of Manitoba Hydro's development program led the provincial government to form a commission of inquiry in 1977. Project cost overruns, and expanded capital spending during a time of declining electricity demand raised serious doubts about the timing of the Lake Winnipeg Regulation project and the development of projects along the Nelson River. The Tritschler Commission (named for Justice George Eric Tritschler (1901–1993)) delivered its final report in December 1979, which made 51 recommendations on Manitoba Hydro governance, planning, financing and operations.

== Comparison of Manitoba Hydro to other utilities ==
Manitoba Hydro is unusual in North America because it is the sole commercial provider of electrical power in the province of Manitoba. It is a Crown corporation closely regulated by the Provincial government. This status arose because of the history of electrification in the Province, where early private commercial developers required a large initial return on investment owing to the high risks of the projects. This limited the economic benefits that electrification would bring. Manitoba Hydro is required by its regulating legislation to give priority to public benefit over profit.

Another unusual feature of Manitoba Hydro is that it is a completely integrated electrical utility, with generation, transmission, and distribution operations. This means that Manitoba Hydro can consider the total system cost and benefits of any new development, rather than, for example, building generation capacity that relies on a second party for transmission. An example of this approach was seen at the Clean Environment Commission public hearings for the recent Wuskwatim Generation Project and the Wuskwatim Transmission Project, in which environmental reviews for both the generating station and associated transmission facilities were carried out at the same time.

Manitoba Hydro's mandate to serve dictates that it builds enough transmission and generating firm capacity to serve the Manitoba home market first. However, in a typical year, more energy is available than the firm capacity. This can be economically exported from the Province. Since this energy is typically sold on short-term contracts or even on a spot market, the returns on these sales increase Manitoba Hydro's retained earnings, allowing domestic rates to be stable and low.

Since Manitoba Hydro is a Crown Corporation paying no dividends and not obligated to provide a return on investment to shareholders, energy costs to industrial and residential consumers are lower than they would otherwise be. These lower costs help offset some of the higher costs of doing business in a region far from large markets.

As a Provincial Crown Corporation, investment decisions by Manitoba Hydro are heavily influenced by political and economic goals of the provincial government. For example, in the 1986 Manitoba provincial election, the incumbent New Democratic Party government announced accelerated construction of the Limestone project, with promises of increased employment as a result. Limestone GS was estimated to create 6000 person-years of direct employment, 11,000 of indirect employment over the construction period of eight years. As part of the contract for the ten turbine-generator units, Canadian General Electric agreed to invest $10,000,000 CAD in Manitoba business operations, and to obtain at least 15 per cent of installation labour locally.

== Current activities ==
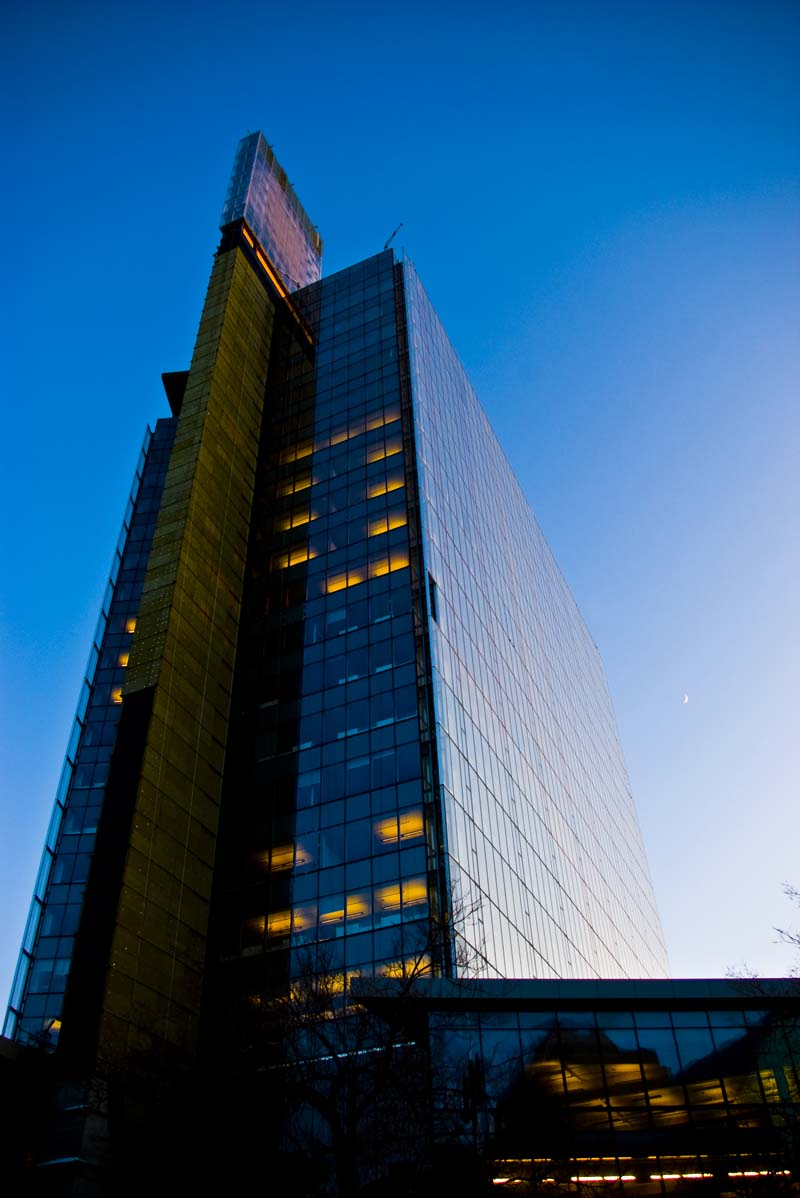
Manitoba Hydro headquarters in Winnipeg

For the fiscal year ending March 31, 2015, Manitoba Hydro serves a peak Manitoba electrical load of more than 4460 megawatts, down 4.9% from the previous year's peak (2013 year end for comparison in parentheses)(4500 megawatts). Electrical supply to Manitoba customers was 21.6 terawatt-hours in fiscal 2015 (21.5 2013), with total revenue due to electricity of $1.808 billion ($1.733 billion) CAD. Extraprovincial sales were at 10.28 terawatthours (9.1 terawatthours), with normal water flows. The company also delivered 2.07 billion cubic metres (2.05 billion) cubic metres of natural gas in 2015, which contributed $573 million CAD to revenues.

Manitoba Hydro had 6410 employees at the end of the 2015 fiscal year (6493 in 2013). Capital assets were valued at nearly $13.9 billion CAD.

In fiscal 2015 the total generation was 35.0 terawatt-hours (33.2 in fiscal 2013). In 2001 generation was nearly 32.7 terawatt-hours, allowing net export of 12 TW·h to customers in the United States, Ontario and Saskatchewan. A terawatt-hour is the average annual consumption of 70,000 Manitoba residences, 14,100 kW·h per year each. The peak load was 4,535 MW.

In fiscal 2015 Manitoba Hydro obtained 0.16% of its total generated electrical energy from fossil fuel at the Brandon and Selkirk thermal generating stations, and 2.38% from wind energy purchased from the St. Leon and St. Joseph wind power projects. About 0.24% of energy distributed in the province was imported.

A subsidiary company, Manitoba Hydro International, provides electric power consulting services. Manitoba Hydro also operates a high-voltage DC laboratory. Meridium Power, a subsidiary company, markets a line of written-pole AC electric motors suitable for heavy loads on single-phase systems and for power quality improvement. W.I.R.E. Services supplies services to transmission line operators for re-rating and verification of transmission line capacity.

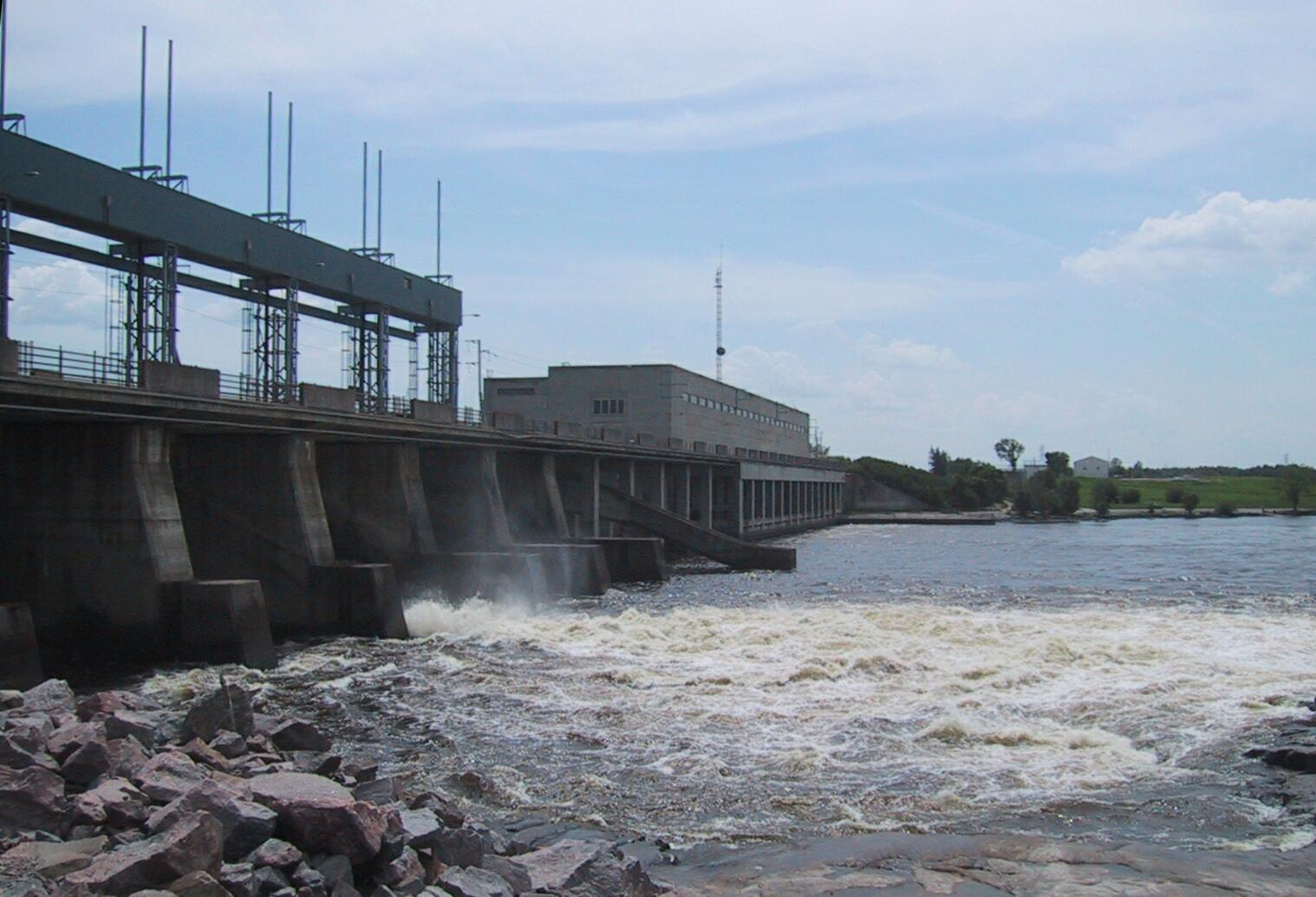
Pine Falls Generating Station, Winnipeg River

== See also ==
- Crown corporation
- Electric power
- Environmental concerns with electricity generation
- Hydroelectricity
- List of Canadian electric utilities
- Nelson River Hydroelectric Project
- Manitoba Electrical Museum
- Electricity sector in Canada
- List of hydroelectric power station failures
