= Wind Power Production Incentive =

The Wind Power Production Incentive, or WPPI, was a program of the Canadian Government that promoted the generation of electricity from wind power in Canada to reduce the amount of greenhouse gas that would otherwise enter the atmosphere from burning fossil fuels.

During the five-year field trial projects were performed to test the performance based on various weather conditions. Provision of economic incentives was guaranteed for up to 1,000 MW of newly installed capacity by 2007. New installations in 2003 included the MacBride Wind Farm (75.9 MW) in Alberta, the North Cape Wind Farm Expansion (5.3 MW), and the Aeolous Wind Turbine (3 MW) in PEI, the Parc éolien du Renard (2.25 MW) in Quebec, the Cypress Hill Wind Farm Expansion (4.6 MW) in Saskatchewan, and the Ontario Place Wind turbine (0.75 MW) in Ontario. The government paid about half the excess cost of producing electricity from wind, compared to conventional sources, for the first 10 years of a project. The Canadian WPPI Program started in 2002 and ended on March 31, 2007, after a change of government. A different program partly replaced it.

A wind farm costs about the same to build per watt of nameplate capacity as a coal-fired power station of similar rating, but the economies of scale are fewer for a wind farm due to the lower quantity of power produced over the life of a station. Depending on location, wind farms may produce nearly full power output only about 28% of the time, whereas a base-loaded coal-fired station runs at full output more than 85% of the time. The WPPI provided a direct subsidy per kilowatthour of wind energy produced, from 1.2 cents down to 0.8 cents depending on the startup date of a project. Measures were taken to distribute the incentive across the country. The total estimated cost of the program was (CDN) $260 million. The program lived a short 5 year life.

== Project description ==
The Canadian government launched the Wind Power Production Incentive in 2002, intending to boost Canada's installed wind capacity by 500% over five years. The program lasted fifteen years and cost Canada 260 million dollars (170 million U.S. dollars), and it was expected to earn roughly 1.5 billion Canadian dollars (1 billion U.S. dollars) of capital investments across the country.

An internal audit in 2006 observed that capacity factors were overestimated by applicants, so less capacity was supplied than intended.

== Project history ==
In 2002, Canada upheld the Kyoto Protocol, a nationwide pledge to help maintain and reduce greenhouse gas based on the theory that society has caused global warming. Canada set goals to increase renewable resources for energy diversification, further the development of technology in all aspects, create new jobs and increase the amount of trade internationally. Canada is supported by provincial and federal governments because of their increased development of incentive programs such as arctic energy alliances, gas distribution, and a variety of business programs. The Wind Energy Research and Development (WERD) program is the study of kinetic energy transformed into electricity. As a part of National Resources Canada, this program is Canada's main resource for technical support.

== Program failures, superseding, and lasting effects ==
The Wind Power Production Incentive lost its funding in 2006, five years into its planned 15-year lifespan. It was ultimately replaced the following year in part by a newer, more forward-thinking program, ecoEnergy for Renewable Power. The Wind Power Production Incentive was created as an immediate response to Canada's upholding of the Kyoto Protocol. It was one of two programs formed to address the motives of the Kyoto Protocol along with the Renewable Energy Deployment Initiative (REDI), which focused on smaller-scale production and renewable heat. During the life of these programs, their shortcomings began to surface. These shortcomings were the product of government officials reacting too hastily to newly evidenced environmental concerns resulting from the burning of fossil fuels for energy.

Through further research and testing, the concept of relying solely on wind power for Canada's energy needs proved to be inefficient and impractical. The superseding program, ecoEnergy for Renewable Power, uses government funding and tax incentives to encourage the production of various renewable energy sources such as low-impact hydro, biomass, photovoltaic and geothermal energy in addition to the wind power Canada was already heavily invested in. The more diversified approach limits the risks involved with becoming too heavily dependent on a single energy source. These risks include increased costs and unexpected decreases in the production of a particular energy source which could cause an energy crisis. EcoEnergy for Renewable Power is part of a larger program called the ecoACTION Clean Air Agenda, which planned to reduce Canada's greenhouse gas emissions by 17% from 2005 to 2020.

The Wind Power Production Incentive program was not a complete failure, but merely a premature and under-informed attempt at a large issue. The economics of the program proved quite prolific. Government funding was rewarded with substantial increases in wind power production amounting to 924 MW of clean wind energy. Much of this blueprint created by the WPPI was carried over into the new program with updated logistics. "The ecoEnergy for Renewable Power program will provide an incentive of one cent per kilowatt hour for up to 10 years to eligible projects constructed over the next four years that generate clean electricity from renewable sources" (Brown), a 0.2 cent per kilowatt hour decrease from the initial WPPI incentive. While also being expanded to include incentives for the production of more renewable energy sources, ecoEnergy retained the long-term incentives to provide security for those who participated in the program. The Renewable Energy Deployment Initiative was similarly supplanted by ecoENERGY for Renewable Heat, which "will provide $36 million over four years to increase the adoption of clean renewable thermal technologies for water heating and space heating and cooling" (Brown).

The Wind Power Production Incentive changed the way government officials, energy production companies, and consumers think about clean energy. It jump-started the industry and laid the blueprint for future clean energy acceleration programs in Canada and across the world. Wind energy's share of Canada's total energy consumption has grown at an average rate of 40% annually. Although wind power still accounts for less than 1% of Canada's total energy consumption, the programs the WPPI laid the path for have helped renewable energy sources take on about 11.1 percent of Canada's total energy consumption.
