= Okpik (disambiguation) =

Okpik or Ookpik, the Inuit language word for a snowy owl, may refer to:

- Ookpik, an Inuit handcrafted toy resembling an owl
- Okpik, a cold-weather adventure program created by the Boy Scouts of America
- Okpik's Dream, a Canadian documentary film, released in 2015
- Abe Okpik, an Inuit community leader in Canada, who worked to replace disc numbers with surnames
- dg nanouk okpik, an Alaskan Iñupiaq poet
- Ookpik, a comic strip drawn from 1964 to 1966 by Al Beaton
