= Ookpik =

Inuit handcrafted toy

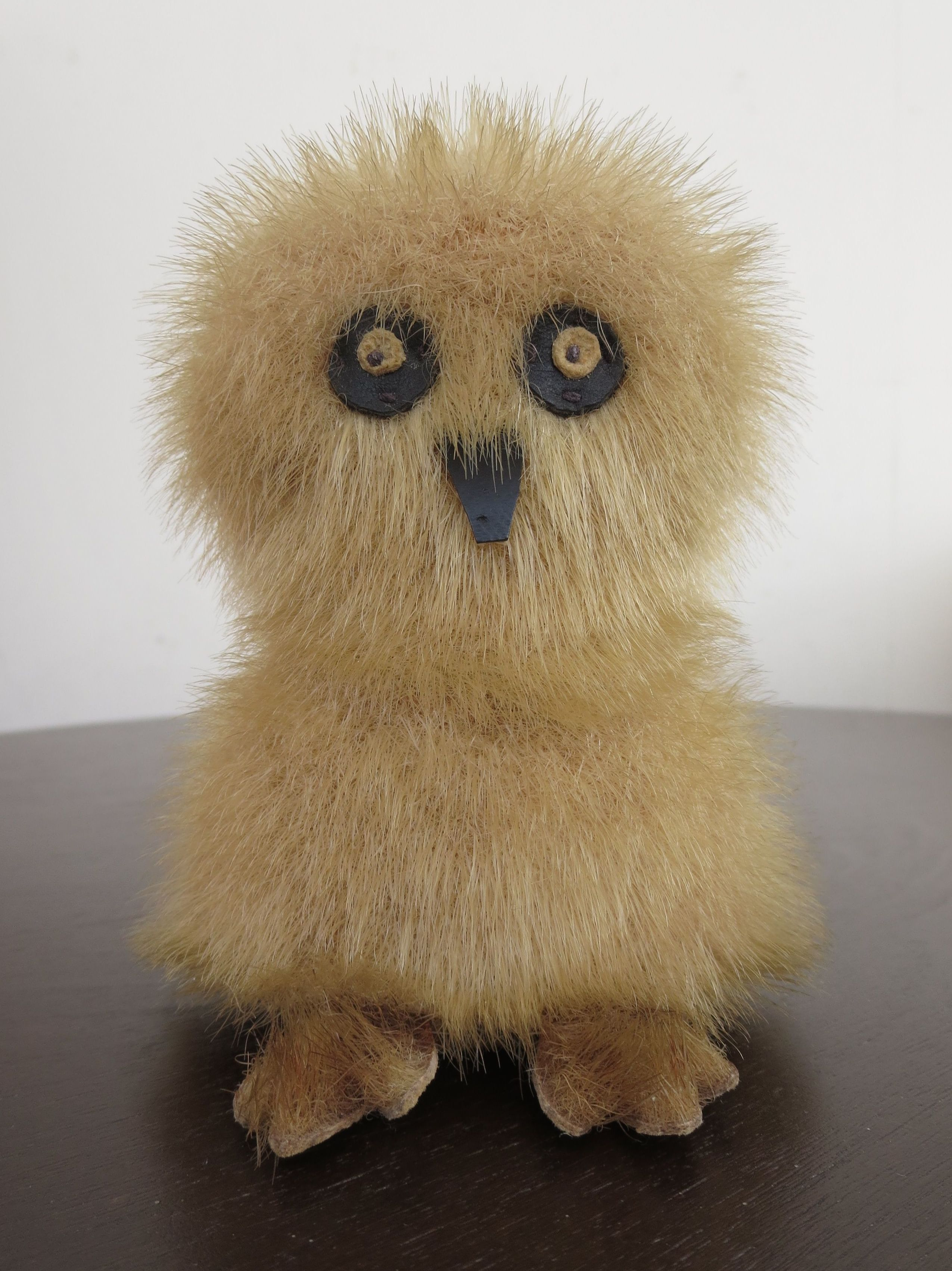
- A sealskin Ookpik from the mid-1960s
- Type: Souvenir handicraft
- Invented by: Jeannie Snowball
- Company: Fort Chimo Eskimo Co-operative
- Country: Canada
- Availability: 1963–present
- Materials: Sealskin; wolf fur

An Ookpik ([ukˈpik]) is a popular Inuit handicraft toy. It is a small, souvenir owl with large head and big eyes, a beak, and small black talons. They are often made from wolf fur, sealskin and other traditional materials.

Ukpik (ᐅᒃᐱᒃ) is the Inuktitut word for snowy owl.

== History ==
The original Ookpik was created in the early 1960s and made from sealskin. The figure was recreated by Jeannie Snowball of Fort Chimo, now Kuujjuaq, for a trade fair in Philadelphia in 1964. The Ookpik figures were created at the Fort Chimo Eskimo Co-operative in Quebec in 1963. The Ookpik is a symbol by which Canadian handicrafts are identified internationally.

Many Canadians and Americans remember owning an Ookpik, and remember it as a popular symbol of Canada.

== Mascot ==
The Northern Alberta Institute of Technology's (NAIT) mascot is the Ook, a shortened version of Ookpik. NAIT was presented this mascot in 1964 by the Federal Department of Northern Affairs and Natural Resources (now Indian and Northern Affairs Canada). Most of NAIT's sports teams are called the Ooks.

Okpik is both the name and the mascot for certain regional cold-weather camping programs run by the Boy Scouts of America. The original Okpik training was developed at the Northern Tier High Adventure Bases in Ely, Minnesota in the 1970s, and several other BSA high adventure bases have since adopted similar curricula.

== Music ==
The Ookpik Waltz was published in 1965 by the late, Mission, British Columbia, fiddler Frankie Rodgers.

Dance of the Ookpiks, an instrumental song by the Regents, reached #10 on RPM's Canadian Content chart on 11 January 1965 and made it onto some local charts. It did not make RPM's main chart.

== Comic strip ==
Ookpik was adapted into a daily comic strip by Toronto Telegram editorial cartoonist Al Beaton. The strip transformed the handcrafted owl into an anthropomorphic character and contributed to Ookpik's spread through Canadian popular culture during the 1960s.

The strip began in the Telegram on 30 November 1964 and was distributed through the Los Angeles Times Syndicate to approximately 50 newspapers in Canada and the United States. It continued until 27 June 1966. Beaton ended the strip after doctors advised him to reduce his workload because of declining health.

== Books ==
Several books, mainly children's, have been written about this popular owl, including:

- Kent Salisbury, illustrations by Beverly Edwards, Ookpik Visits the USA, which, when available, is valued at more than $1,500 (Little Golden Books)
- Dudley Copland, illustrations by James Simpkins OOKPIK the Ogling Arctic Owl (Canadian Century Publishers, 1965)
- Barbara Hazen, illustrations by Irma Wilde Ookpik in the City (Big Golden Book, 1968)
- Bruce Hiscock Ookpik: The Travels of a Snowy Owl (Boyds Mills Press, 2008, ISBN 978-1-59078-461-7)
- Dennis Lee, illustrations by Frank Newfeld, an ookpik features in the book of poems, Alligator Pie (Macmillan Publishers of Canada, ISBN 978-1-55263-338-0)
- Douglas Coupland, the ookpik was featured in the book about Canadian culture, Souvenir of Canada, which was later made into a film (Douglas & McIntyre, ISBN 978-1-55054-917-1)
- Barbara Shook Hazen, illustrations by Harry Devlin The Adventures of Ookpik: A Golden Book, 1968

Ookpik, a comic strip by Allan Beaton, ran daily in the Toronto Telegram and approximately fifty Canadian and American newspapers, including the Los Angeles Times Syndicate, from 30 November 1964, until 27 June 1966. Another source dates the strip to 1963.
