= High adventure =

Type of outdoor experience

High adventure is a type of outdoor experience. It typically is meant to include activities like backpacking, hiking, kayaking or canoeing. It may also include mountaineering, rock climbing, mountain biking, orienteering, hang gliding, paragliding and hot air ballooning.

== High adventure in Scouting ==
Scout leaders may offer traditional canoeing or backpacking high-adventure programs, but high adventure often transcends typical Scouting activities. High adventure activities may include:

- All-terrain vehicles
- Aquatics Lifesaving
- Backpacking
- Camping
- Canoeing
- Caving
- Climbing / Rappelling
- Project COPE / Ropes Course
- Expedition Planning
- Extreme Sports
- Geocaching
- First Aid
- Fishing
- Historical reenactment/Living history
- Horsemanship
- Hunting
- Kayaking
- Leave No Trace
- Motorboating
- Mountain Biking
- Orienteering
- Personal Watercraft
- Sailing
- Search & Rescue
- Scuba Diving
- Shooting Sports/Archery
- Snorkeling
- Space Exploration
- Whitewater Rafting
- Wilderness Survival
- Winter Sports and Camping
- Zip-Line

=== High adventure bases ===
- Summit Bechtel Reserve
- Florida Sea Base
- Northern Tier
- Philmont Scout Ranch

== See also ==
- Order of the Arrow High Adventure
- Outward Bound
- Outdoor education
- Powder Horn (Boy Scouts of America)
- Ten essential items of gear

Related activities:

- Thru-hiking, hiking a trail from end to end
- Hillwalking
- List of long-distance footpaths
- Hiking equipment
- River trekking
- Rogaining
