= George Edward Williams =

American politician (1899–??)

George "Eddie" Edward Williams (July 28, 1899 – ?) was a member of the Mississippi State Senate between 1957 and 1965.

Williams was born in Olive Branch, Mississippi. Before taking office, Williams was a teacher, farmer, and the tax assessor of DeSoto County between 1932 and 1935. He held leadership roles in various local organizations.
