= Desoto County Academy =

Desoto Christian Academy
- 100 Academy Drive, Olive Branch, MS 38654; United States

Information
- Type: Private
- Motto: "Learners Today. Leaders Tomorrow."
- Established: 1970
- Principal: Andy Price
- Grades: PK-12
- Colors: Navy Blue & Powder Blue
- Team name: Ambassadors
- Website: www.desotochristian.com

Desoto Christian Academy is a non-denominational Christian private school in Olive Branch, Mississippi. The school serves more than 600 students in grades pre-kindergarten through twelve.

The school was founded in 1970 as Ark Academy as a caucasian only school during a period of school desegregation in Mississippi. It was renamed Desoto County Academy in 1974 and later became Desoto Christian Academy in 2018. The school is now integrated and enrolls students of all races and nationalities.

== History ==
Betty Furniss founded Ark Academy in 1970. Veronica Elizabeth “Betty” Trainer Furniss was a member of the Citizens' Councils of America. The name Ark Academy was chosen, because, just as Noah is said to have saved humanity from a great flood, Furniss believed she was saving humanity from school integration.

The school was renamed Desoto County Academy in 1974. The mascot has been changed from Mighty Doves to Ambassadors.
