= Rocks and Boulder Cove =

Man-made climbing facility in West Virginia, USA

Coordinates: 37.9047°N 81.1200°W

- Interactive map of Rocks and Boulder Cove
- Location: Summit Bechtel Family National Scout Reserve
- Nearest city: Beckley

The Rocks and Boulder Cove is a climbing area at the Summit Bechtel Family National Scout Reserve near Beckley, West Virginia. It the largest man-made climbing facility in the world.

The Summit Bechtel Family National Scout Reserve’s primary function is to host the National Boy Scout Scout Jamboree every 4 years. The climbing walls at The Summit Bechtel Reserve make up the largest outdoor climbing facility in the world. The rock climbing structure was built to be a key part of the programming for the National Jamboree in 2013, keeping in mind that it would also be used in a larger event in 2019, the World Scout Jamboree.

The Boulder Cove includes top rope climbing, rappelling, and bouldering features. The top-rope climbing structures range in height from 19 to 36 feet. There are 25 lanes that can accommodate a single climber at any given time. These structures also have designated lanes for rappelling. Along with the 12 rappel stations on the climbing walls, there is a 72-foot platform where patrons can rappel as well. Lastly, there are three climbing boulders with an average height of 13 feet.
