= High adventure bases of Scouting America =

Outdoor recreational facilities in North America

High Adventure Bases
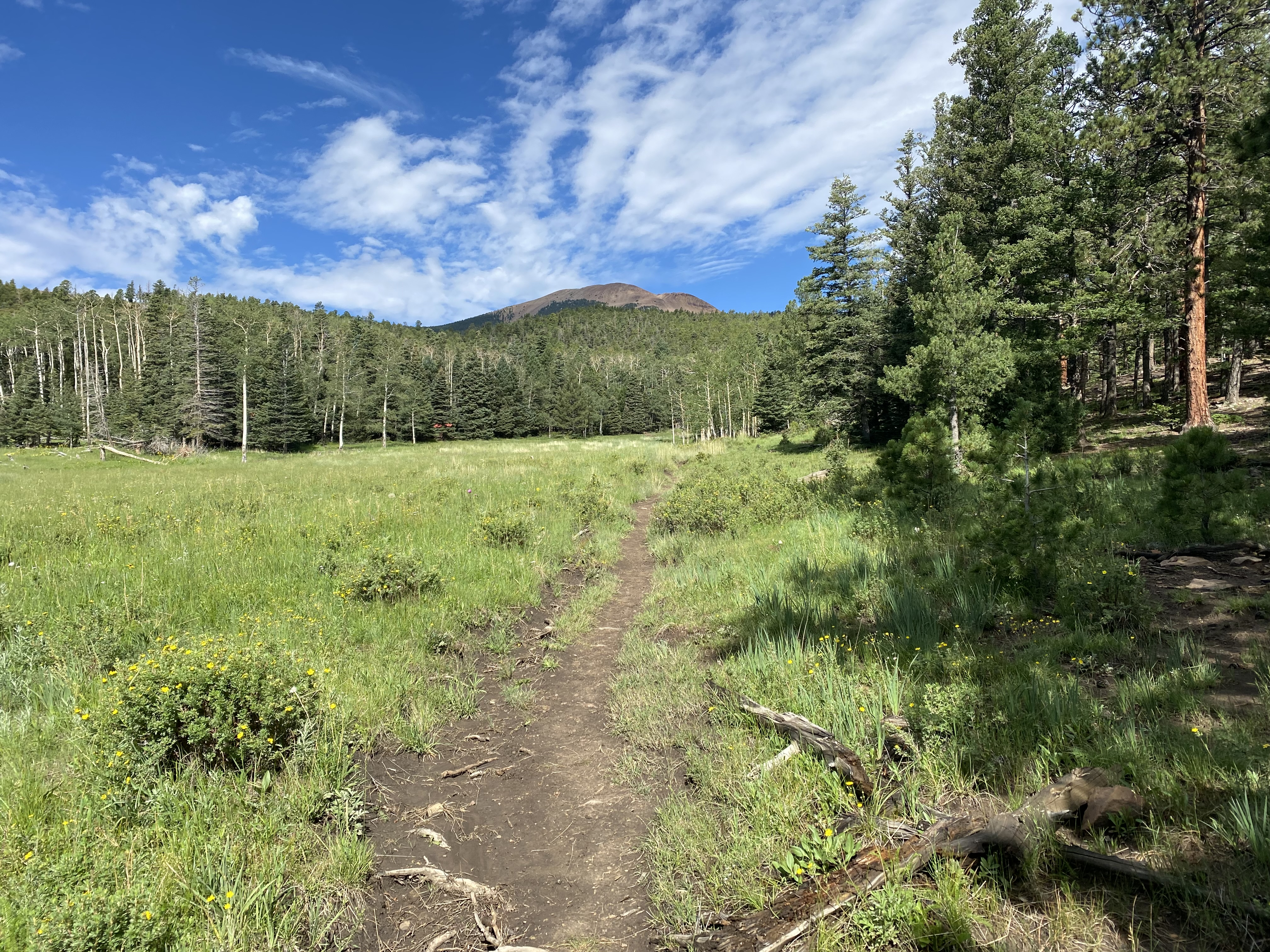
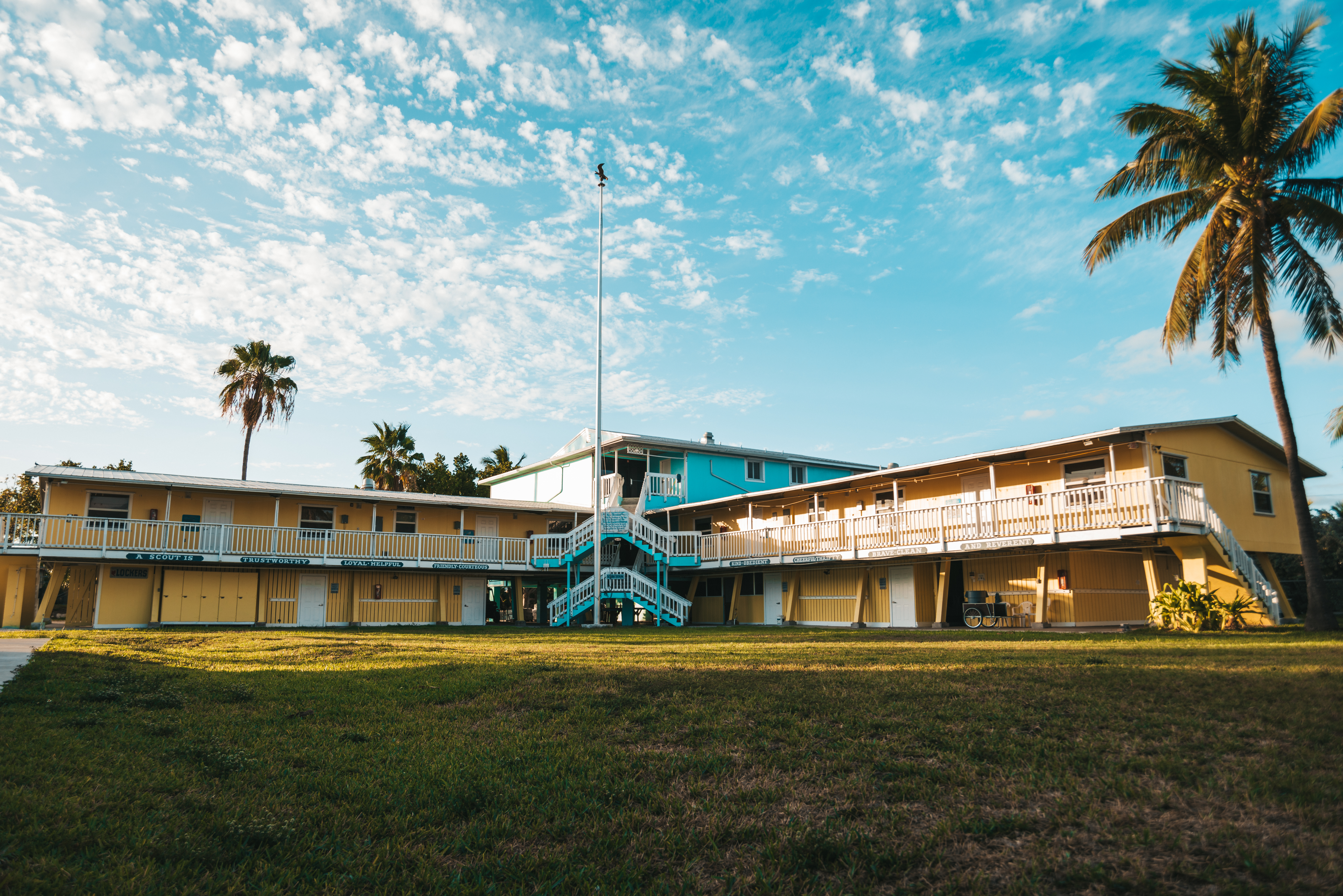
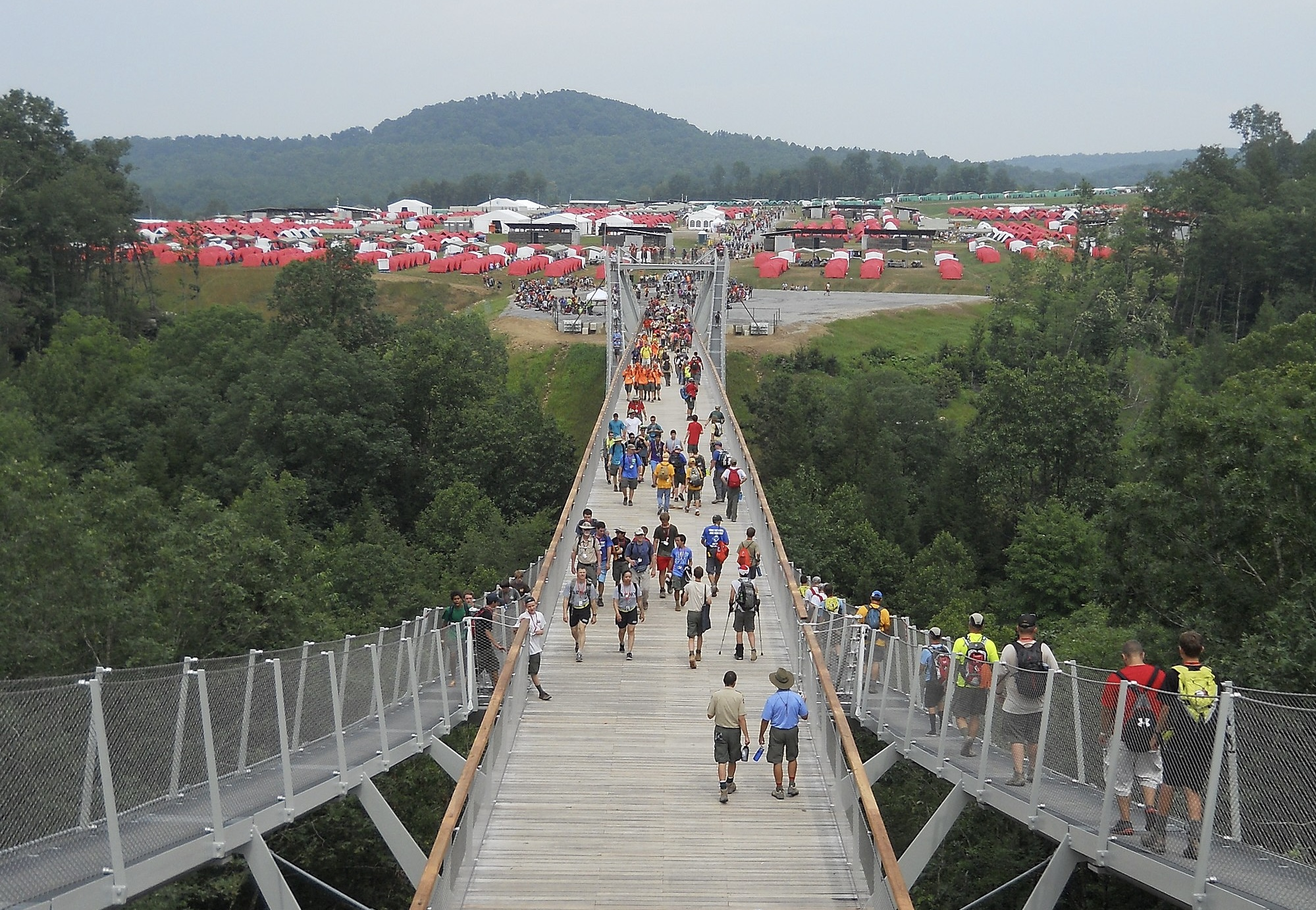
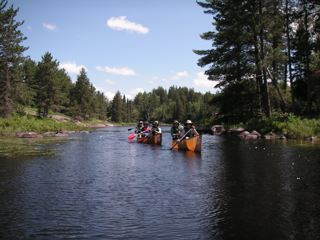
- Clockwise from upper left: Ewells Park camp at Philmont, sailing and scuba dorms at Sea Base, Scouts canoeing in the Boundary Waters near Northern Tier, CONSOL Energy Bridge at The Summit.

- Owner: Scouting America
- Location: United States and Canada

High adventure bases are outdoor recreation facilities owned and operated at the national level by Scouting America. There are four bases, with each offering training and wilderness programs such as canoeing, backpacking and sailing.

The four high adventure bases are located at Philmont Scout Ranch (New Mexico), Sea Base (Florida Keys, U.S. Virgin Islands, and the Bahamas), Northern Tier (Minnesota, Manitoba, and Ontario), and Summit Bechtel Reserve (West Virginia).

== Northern Tier ==
Northern Tier is a collection of high adventure bases in Minnesota, Ontario, and Manitoba. It is made up of Charles L. Sommers Canoe Base in Ely, Minnesota operating in the Boundary Waters Canoe Area Wilderness (BWCAW) and Quetico Provincial Park, Don Rogert Canoe Base in Atikokan, Ontario operating in Quetico Provincial Park, and Northern Expeditions Base in Bissett, Manitoba operating in Atikaki Provincial Wilderness Park and points beyond. It is the oldest national high adventure base operated by Scouting America.

Northern Tier offers mostly wilderness canoe trips, although other activities such as cold weather camping exist as well. Typical canoe trips cover 50 to 150 miles (80 to 240 km) and take 6 to 10 days. With each crew is a highly skilled technician/instructor called an "Interpreter".

== Philmont Scout Ranch ==
Philmont Scout Ranch is a ranch located near the town of Cimarron, New Mexico covering approximately 137,500 acres (556 km^{2}) of wilderness in the Sangre de Cristo Mountains of the Rocky Mountains of northern New Mexico, near the town of Cimarron. The main part of the ranch, formerly the property of oil baron Waite Phillips, was donated to the Scouting organization in 1938. Along with other donations and purchases, it is currently in use as a national high adventure base where crews of Scouts and Venturers take part in backpacking expeditions and other outdoor activities. It is the largest youth camp in the world by size. Philmont's terrain is mountainous, ranging in elevation from 6,500 feet (2,000 m) to 12,441 feet (3,792 m).

Philmont is also home to the Philmont Training Center, which is the main center for Scouting America’s national-level training for volunteers and professionals. In addition to its Scouting America programs, Philmont continues to operate as a ranch, maintaining a stock of cattle, horses, burros and bison.

== Sea Base ==
Sea Base is a high adventure base in the Florida Keys. The main facility is located in Islamorada, Florida on the end of Lower Matecumbe Key. Other locations include the Brinton Environmental Center located on Summerland Key (which oversees Big Munson Island located 5.5 miles (8.9 km) southeast) and the Bahamas Sea Base in Marsh Harbour, Abaco, Bahamas.

Main programs include sailing— including open water and reef sailing —island camping, snorkeling, and scuba diving. The Florida Sea Base Conference Center has become an alternative training site to the Philmont Training Center. Most conferences it hosts are for professionals or national level committees, but it also hosts conferences for outside groups.

== The Summit ==
High adventure activities at the Summit Bechtel Family National Scout Reserve are operated through the Paul R. Christen National High Adventure Base. The Summit was purchased in 2009 and the high adventure base began operation in 2014. The New River Gorge region offers white water rafting rated from Class II to Class V along the more than 50 miles of river within the New River Gorge National River area. Other outdoor activities that are popular to the area include Rock climbing, rappelling (abseiling), mountain biking, hiking, geocaching, and orienteering. Some of the additional activities added with help from Scout feedback at the 2010 Jamboree, are skateboarding, freestyle BMX, mountainboarding, ATV riding, paddle boarding, dragon boats racing, and ziplines.

The Summit is also the site for the national Scout jamboree and a training center. The reserve consists of a 10,600-acre (43 km^{2}) reclaimed mine site near Beckley, West Virginia. The purchase of the property was enabled by a $50 million grant from Stephen Bechtel, Jr.

== Former national bases ==
=== Northern Wisconsin National Canoe Base ===
Region 7 Canoe Base
- Location: Boulder Junction, Wisconsin
- Founded: 1940
- Defunct: 1983

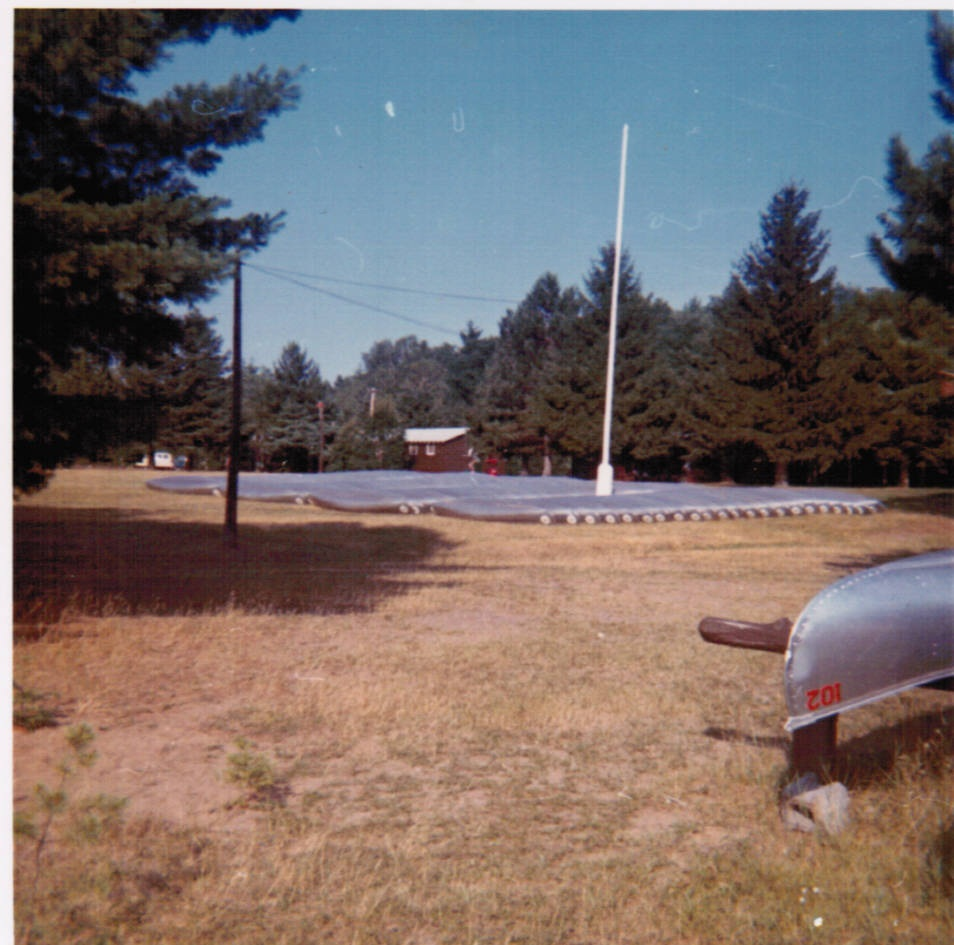
Northern Wisconsin National Canoe Base circa 1974

Northern Wisconsin National Canoe Base was opened in 1940 on the site of a former Civilian Conservation Corps camp on the south end of the east shore of White Sand Lake in northern Wisconsin. The closest town to that site is Boulder Junction, Wisconsin.

The base was originally named MIWI after the initials of the four states in the region. In 1943 it was renamed Region 7 Canoe Base. The base had also been referenced in publications as Region Seven Explorer Canoe Base. Around 1967 it was renamed Northern Wisconsin National Canoe Base, as publications begin referencing the new name during this period. By that time, thousands of Scouts were embarking on wilderness canoe trips from the canoe base every summer, principally from the Chicago area due to its proximity.

The primary program was wilderness canoe trips, through the lakes and rivers of northern Wisconsin and the southern edge of the Upper Peninsula of Michigan. The base provided training, outfitting, and guiding for these trips as well as sleeping and meal facilities for groups of 6-12 crew members, including an adult leader, as they prepared to start or end canoe trips. They also provided transportation to and from starting and ending points. Training included an intensive Voyageur course for the youth leader of a group during the week prior to the group's trip. Additional programs for Scouts included whitewater trips on the lower Flambeau Flowage, swimming at the White Sand Lake beach, informal sandlot football and softball games between staff members and Scouts at the base, and winter camping in the cabins left by the CCC.

Canoe trips launched from the base utilized hundreds of different lakes and rivers and about 300 campsites. About half of these sites were on public lands; the others were on private lands under special arrangements, which typically included maintenance work by the Scouts. Examples of closer frequently used waterways include White Sand, Lost Canoe, Pallette, Escanaba, Presque Isle, Crab, Trout, Boulder, and Wild Rice lakes and the Manitowish and Trout Rivers. In the 1960s, staff tried to open up new routes using creeks, with occasionally hilarious results. While the canoe trip area covered millions of acres, most trips were concentrated in the 400,000-acre (1,600 km^{2}) area going about 12 miles (19 km) north, 10 miles (16 km) east, 18 miles (29 km) west, and 10 miles (16 km) south of the base.

The base celebrated its 40th anniversary in 1980 and enjoyed its most popular years in 1980–81, but usage declined rapidly and the permanent base was closed in 1983. Numerous interrelated factors contributed to its demise, including Scout leaders and executives lobbying for closure in favor of other bases, declining usage, increased residential development in the area used for its canoe trips, and a heavy snowfall during the 1982-83 winter that collapsed the roof of the dining hall, which was never rebuilt.

While the permanent base was closed, expeditions continued to be led using guides from Charles Sommers base until the summer of 1986. The penultimate canoe trip was with Troop 912 from Manitowoc, Wisconsin from 8/10/1986 to 8/16/1986.

=== Maine National High Adventure Area ===
The Maine National High Adventure Area was established in 1970 due to the efforts of BSA Scout Executive Bud Jeffrey, Seven Island Lands Company President John Sinclair, and Bill Wadsworth and John Donnell of the BSA National Office. The first of three Maine National High Adventure bases was established at the site of the former Foster's Matagamon Sporting Camp on the north side of Matagamon Lake, and was called Maine Matagamon National High Adventure Base. This base operated as a single unit in 1971 and 1972. An additional base was established at Pittston Farm on Seboomook Lake in 1973, and a third on Sysladobsis Lake, was operated in 1971 and 1979.

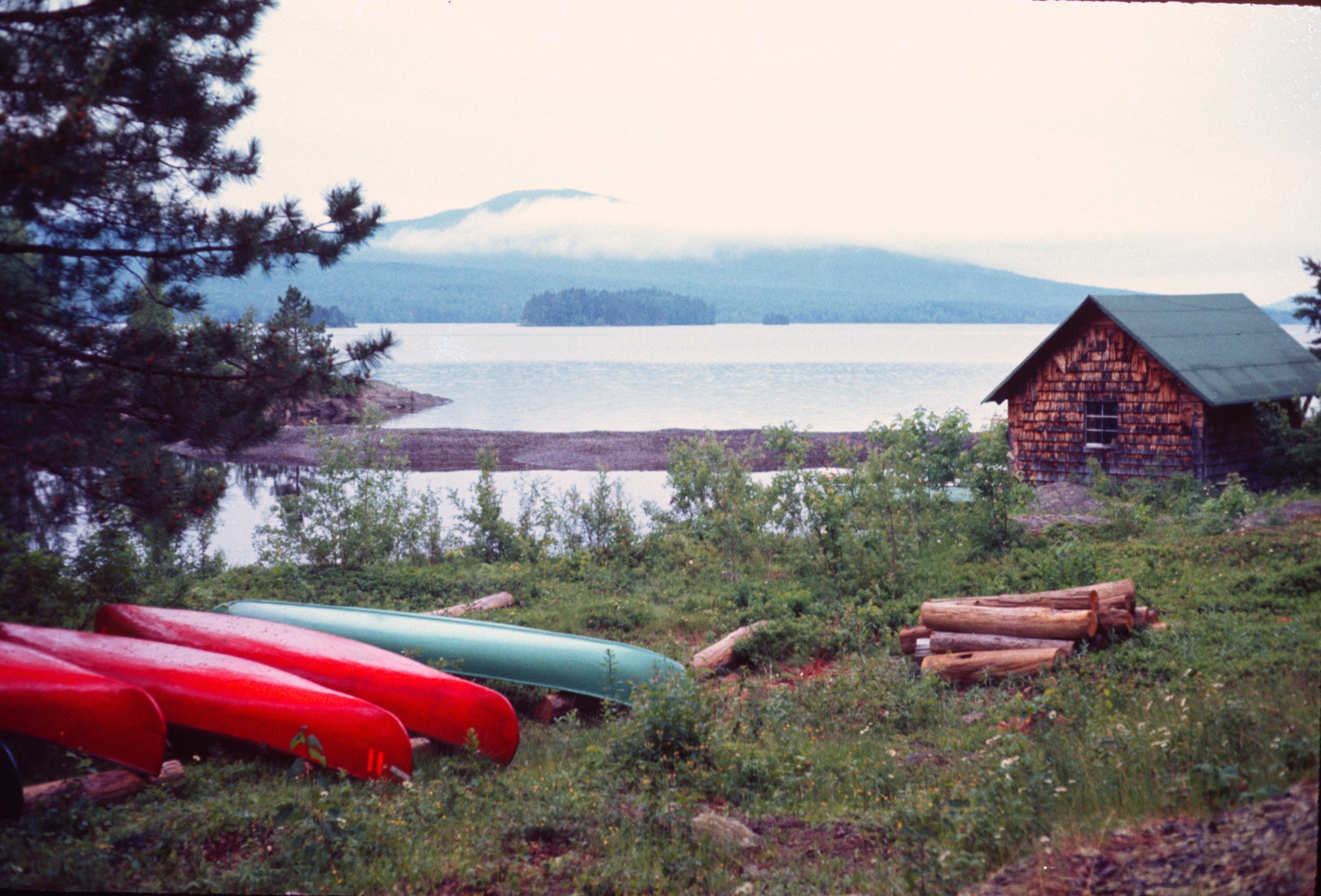
Waterfront at Maine Matagamon National High Adventure Base, summer 1971

Matagamon and Seboomook bases were the core of the program for many years. It was a program that exposed thousands of Scouts to the lakes, rivers, and mountains of the North Maine woods, providing them with an appreciation of wild lands, no trace camping, and self-sufficiency and safety in the wilderness.

Maine National High Adventure was operated as a national base until 1991, when the National BSA Office shut down the program. In 1993, the Matagamon base reopened as Maine High Adventure, an outdoor program run today by the Katahdin Area Council.

There is an active staff association called Maine High Adventure Staff Association that is dedicated to the history of the Maine National High Adventure Area, and to the support of the current Maine High Adventure Area.

Land Between the Lakes Gateway National High Adventure Base

The Land Between the Lakes Gateway National High Adventure Base was located on Shaw Branch of Lake Barkley near Cadiz, Kentucky. It opened in 1973 as a cooperative effort between the BSA and the Tennessee Valley Authority. The base hosted Boy Scout Troops, Explorer Posts, and some Girl Scout Troops for weeklong adventure treks. Participants had the option to choose backpacking, pontoon boat camping, canoe camping, or sail boat camping and utilized itineraries on both Kentucky Lake and Lake Barkley in both Kentucky and Tennessee. Although Land Between the Lakes ceased operations formally in 1983, their last summer with campers was 1979. Former LBL Staff members removed the High Adventure Base welcome sign in the summer of 1980 and donated it to the National Scouting Museum in Murray, Kentucky. After the LBL Base was closed, most of the equipment was donated to the Florida Sea Base and to Roy C. Manchester Boy Scout Camp on Kentucky Lake, which still operates a summer Aquabase program with weeklong sailing trips today.

== Awards ==
The Triple Crown of National High Adventure award was created in 1995 and later the Grand Slam of National High Adventure award was created in 2014 by the Charles L. Sommers Alumni Association, Inc. to both promote the Boy Scouts of America's National High Adventure programs and help identify those Scouts with a thirst for high adventure who may be interested in serving on the staff of Northern Tier High Adventure Bases and other National High Adventure Bases. The Triple Crown of National High Adventure award honors those who have participated in a high adventure program at three of the Boy Scouts of America's four National High Adventure Bases. The Grand Slam of National High Adventure award honors those who have participated a high adventure program at all four of the Boy Scouts of America's National High Adventure Bases.

== Alumni Associations ==
=== Charles L. Sommers Alumni Association, Inc. ===
The Charles L. Sommers Alumni Association, Inc. (SAA) is a non-profit Minnesota charity with the purpose to provide a continuing interest in and support for the mission and programs of the Northern Tier National High Adventure program, the Boy Scouts of America's oldest National High Adventure program.

Objectives include preserving and promoting wilderness camping, high adventure, and training opportunities; spreading the spirit of "The Far Northland" throughout Scouting, and offering the time, talent, and treasure of its membership to the Northern Tier National High Adventure program. Through its members, it has been instrumental as the first alumni association to launch capital campaigns in conjunction with the Boy Scouts of America to enhance high adventure base facilities and establish an endowed seasonal staff scholarship program.

Active membership is open to all persons who have served on the seasonal or permanent staff of any Northern Tier National High Adventure program, including the Charles L. Sommers National High Adventure Base, Donald Rogert Canoe Base (Atikokan, Ontario), Northern Expeditions (Bissett, Manitoba), Northern Wisconsin National Canoe Base, and Maine National High Adventure Base.

Affiliate membership is open to all former adult crew advisors from any Northern Tier National High Adventure program and any adult who wishes to maintain a significant interest in the mission and success of the Northern Tier National High Adventure program.

=== Philmont Staff Association, Inc. ===
The Philmont Staff Association, Inc. (PSA) is a non-profit New Mexico charity with the purpose to provide a continued support of Philmont Scout Ranch.

Membership is open to all those who have served on staff at Philmont. In addition to traditional staff positions, membership is also open to those who have served on staff of Autumn Adventure, Kanik, Philmont Training Center, National Junior Leader Instructor Camp (NJLIC), and National Advanced Youth Leadership Experience (NAYLE). The PSA is the only National High Adventure base alumni association that does not offer membership to those who have not served on staff.

=== Sea Base Alumni and Friends Association, Inc. ===
The Sea Base Alumni and Friends Association, Inc. (SBAFA) is a non-profit Florida charity with the purpose to provide continued support of Florida National High Adventure Sea Base. Objectives include supporting the staff, programs and interest of Florida Sea Base.

Membership is open to all those with an affiliation to Florida Sea Base, including current staff, former staff, members of the community, volunteers, and past participants.

=== Summit Bechtel Reserve Staff Association ===
The Summit Bechtel Reserve Staff Association was chartered on October 14, 2014, "with the purpose to "promote a continuing interest in and support for the vision, mission and programs of the Summit Bechtel Reserve... by and among those who have served the Summit Bechtel Reserve as staff or faculty." Since then they have provided SBR staff with many accommodations like pouring concrete pads in Foxtrot Staff Camp and installing electricity to all staff tents. They also annually award seasonal staff with scholarships so staff can continue studies after working at SBR.
