= Olive Branch Airport =

- IATA: OLV; ICAO: KOLV; FAA LID: OLV

Summary
- Airport type: Public use
- Owner: City of Olive Branch
- Serves: Olive Branch, Mississippi
- Elevation AMSL: 402 ft / 123 m
- Coordinates: 34°58′44″N 089°47′13″W

Map
- Location of airport in Mississippi OLV (the United States)

Runways
| Direction | Length | | Surface |
| Direction | ft | m | Surface |
|---|---|---|---|
| 18/36 | 6,000 | 1,829 | Asphalt |

Statistics
- Aircraft operations (2022): 85,247
- Based aircraft (2022): 117
- Source: Federal Aviation Administration

Olive Branch Airport (IATA: OLV, ICAO: KOLV, FAA LID: OLV) is owned by the City of Olive Branch. It is a public use airport in De Soto County, Mississippi, United States. It is located three nautical miles (6 km) northeast of the central business district of Olive Branch, Mississippi. This airport was included in the National Plan of Integrated Airport Systems for 2021–2025, which categorized it as a general aviation reliever airport.

The airport is about a 30-minute drive from downtown Memphis, Tennessee and 10 minutes from the Memphis city limits, making it an easily accessible satellite airport for the general aviation and business air travel communities wanting to access the East Memphis/Germantown/Collierville area. It is owned and operated by the City of Olive Branch.

== History ==
In the early 1970s, Holiday Inn announced they would construct what would be called Holiday Inn University and Conference Center in Olive Branch, Mississippi. Simultaneous with construction of the university, Holiday Inn began work on a 3,000-acre (12 km^{2}) industrial park and the Olive Branch Airport that opened in January, 1973. Today the development is known as Olive Branch Industrial Park. It is an 800-acre (3.2 km^{2}) fully planned, improved, and restricted industrial facility. It includes the Olive Branch Airport—one of Mississippi's busiest—offering a 6,000-foot (1,800 m) paved, lighted runway, and full service fixed-base operations (via Olive Branch Aviation). Today the Olive Branch Airport is owned and operated by the City of Olive Branch.

== Facilities and aircraft ==
Olive Branch Airport covers an area of 414 acres (168 ha) at an elevation of 402 feet (123 m) above mean sea level. It has one runway designated 18/36 with an asphalt surface measuring 6,000 by 100 feet (1,829 x 30 m). There is a fully functioning "Class D" control tower, with an up-link to Memphis International Airport's radar, which is staffed from 7am - 9pm CST daily. The airport has an ILS to Runway 18 and a LOC/DME to Runway 36.

Facilities include a general aviation terminal, 25 conventional hangars, 26 T-hangar units, and 140 paved tie-down spaces. The airport offers on-site car rental through Hertz Rent-A-Car, Enterprise Rent-A-Car and lodging arrangements at the nearby Whispering Woods Conference Center (previously the Holiday Inn University and Conference Center) and Fairfield Inn.

Olive Branch Aviation is the fixed-base operator (FBO). They provide both 100LL and Jet-A fuel for aircraft that are both based there and transient.

Located at Olive Branch Airport is Luke Weathers Flight Academy, a flight school offering FAR 141 and 61 Flight Training, JET Transition Training, a Maintenance and Air Traffic Control Academy, UAV Pilot Training, Military Rotor Fixed Wing Transition, Air Force Candidate Flight Training, Mentoring and more.

Olive Branch Airport is also home to Air Venture Flight Center is a flight training school and aircraft rental company based at the airport. They have a full-time staff of professional flight instructors and a large fleet of Cessna aircraft as well as a Piper Arrow and two Beechcraft Dutchess. It is also a Cessna Pilot Center and operates a charter company called Vectair-USA.

In 2021, nationally known ATP Flight School established a school at the Olive Branch Airport.

Any aircraft from a small training aircraft to a Bombardier Global Express business jet can operate to, from, and around Olive Branch Airport. A few charter companies have piston singles and twins, jets, and/or turbojets based at Olive Branch Airport. Vectair-USA uses a Beechcraft King Air 9L for chartered flights. OneSky Jets has one King Air B100 based there.

For the 12-month period ending December 31, 2022, the airport had 85,247 aircraft operations, an average of 233 per day: 91% general aviation, 8% air taxi and 1% military. In April 2022, there were 117 aircraft based at this airport: 94 single-engine, 15 multi-engine, 7 jet and 1 helicopter.

== See also ==
- List of airports in Mississippi
