= Northern Alberta Institute of Technology =

Polytechnic Institute in Edmonton, Alberta, Canada

Northern Alberta Institute of Technology (NAIT)
- Motto: Discere, Efficere, Praestare (Latin)
- Motto in English: "To Learn, To Do, To Succeed"
- Operational: May 27, 1963
- Type: Public Institute of Technology
- Established: 1962; 64 years ago
- Academic affiliations: CICan, AACTI, CBIE, CUP, Polytechnics Canada
- Endowment: $52.6 million (2023)
- President: Laura Jo Gunter
- Provost: Peter Leclaire
- Faculty: 2,093 (2023)
- Students: 14,636 (2023-24 fulltime equivalent)
- Undergraduates: 16,100 (full-time); 11,700 (part-time) (2023)
- Postgraduates: 1,230
- Other students: 7,009 apprenticeships, 2,600 international students (2023)
- Location: Edmonton, Alberta, Canada; 53°34′10.50″N 113°30′11.63″W
- Campus: Urban (Main campus)
- Other campuses: Patricia; Souch; Spruce Grove
- Newspaper: Techlifetoday magazine NAIT Nugget
- Colours: Athletics: Gold and Royal Blue; Institute: Royal Blue and Light Blue
- Nickname: Ooks
- Sporting affiliations: CCAA, Alberta Colleges Athletics Conference
- Mascots: Snowy owl, Ookpik
- Website: www.nait.ca

The Northern Alberta Institute of Technology (NAIT) is a public polytechnic and applied sciences institute in Edmonton, Alberta, Canada.

NAIT offers approximately 120 credit programs leading to degrees, applied degrees, diplomas, and certificates. As of 2023, there are approximately 15,700 students enrolled in credit programs, 7,009 apprentices registered in apprenticeship training, 12,100 students enrolled in non-credit courses, and more than 20,000 registrants for customized corporate based training. NAIT also attracts international students from 84 countries. NAIT is similar to an institute of technology or university of applied sciences as termed in other jurisdictions. The campus newspaper, the NAIT Nugget, is a member of the Canadian University Press (CUP).

== Academic programs ==
The polytechnic confers certificates, diplomas, applied degrees and baccalaureate degrees. NAIT's four-year baccalaureate degrees (Bachelor of Technology in Technology Management and Bachelor of Technology in Construction Management and Bachelor of Business Administration) were launched in 2007.

NAIT is one of the largest apprenticeship trainers in Canada offering 31 registered trades programs.

== History ==
In 1959, the Alberta provincial government decided to build an Edmonton facility to supplement apprenticeship and vocational training, which was at the time handled by the Provincial Institute of Technology and Art (PITA) in Calgary. The new institution would be named the Northern Alberta Institute of Technology (NAIT) and PITA would be renamed the Southern Alberta Institute of Technology (SAIT). Construction of the new facility began in January 1962. The first class was enrolled in October, a group of 29 Communication Electrician apprentices. NAIT officially opened on May 27, 1963, with a ceremony led by Premier Ernest Manning. The first graduation ceremony happened in 1965, with a class of 326 graduates. In 1982, the government transferred control to the new Board of Governors, chaired by Allan McCagherty. NAIT has been a leading polytechnic for more than 60 years. The school marked its 50th anniversary in 2012.

== Campuses ==
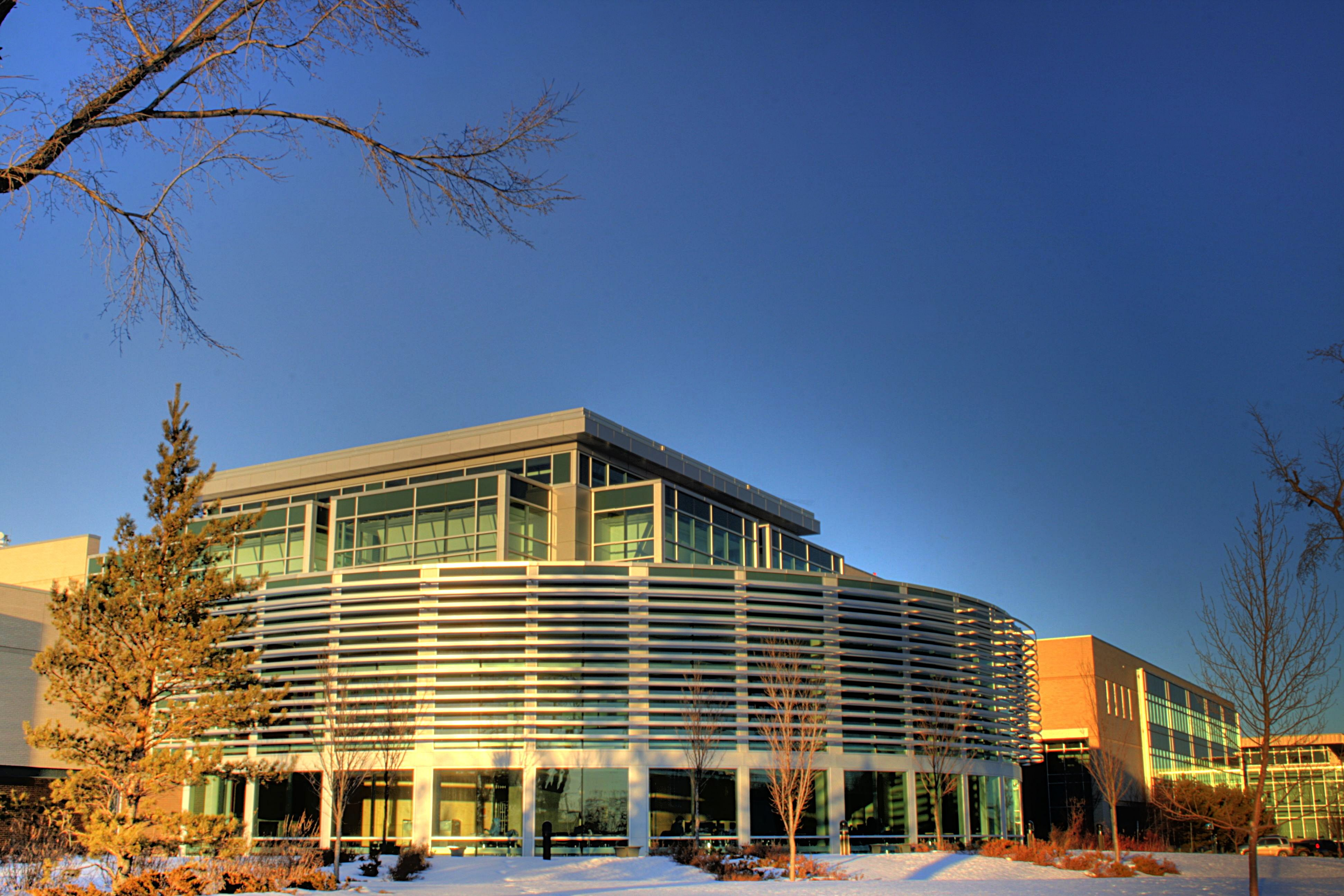
The Hewlett-Packard Centre on NAIT's Main Campus.

The institute has four campuses located in Edmonton and Spruce Grove:

- Main Campus at 11762 - 106 Street, Edmonton
- Patricia Campus at 12204 - 149 Street, Edmonton
- Souch (pronounced "such") Campus at 7110 Gateway Boulevard, Edmonton
- Crane and Hoist Campus at 281 Tamarack Drive, Spruce Grove

In February 2019, the Main campus acquired 13.27 ha (32.8 acres) of the former Edmonton City Centre Airport with the option for another 3.23 ha (8.0 acres), as well as the 4.8 ha (12 acres) Westwood Transit Garage to the north. This will enable the closure of the Patricia and Souch campuses, and the construction of a student residence building. The Spruce Grove campus will remain open since its crane and hoisting classes cannot be accommodated at the Main campus.

== Mascot ==
NAIT's mascot is the Ook. This is a shortened version of ookpik, the Inuktitut word for the snowy owl. NAIT was presented this mascot in 1964 by the federal Department of Northern Affairs and National Resources, now Crown–Indigenous Relations and Northern Affairs Canada. Most of NAIT's sports teams are now called the Ooks as well.

== Athletics ==
The NAIT Ooks compete in the Canadian Collegiate Athletic Association as a member of the Alberta Colleges Athletics Conference. Ooks team sports include badminton, basketball, curling, ice hockey, soccer, and volleyball. NAIT's official team colours are gold and royal blue.

Irwin Strifler was the Athletic Director from 1968 to 1998.

== Students' association ==
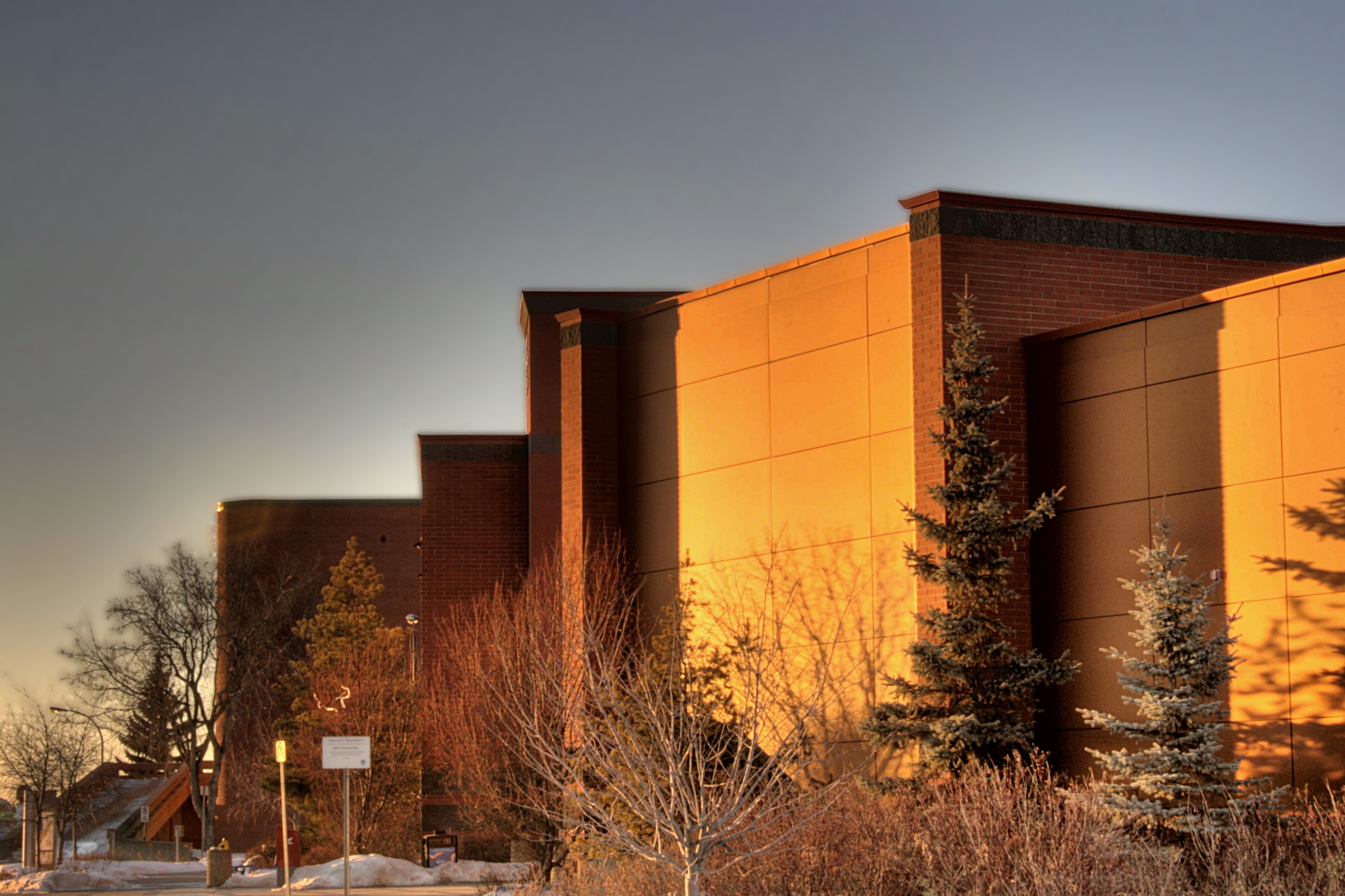
The South Learning Centre on NAIT's Main Campus.

The NAIT Students' Association (NAITSA) is composed entirely of current NAIT students. It is led by a four-person elected Executive Council, and governed by an eighteen-person elected Senate (two representatives from the 9 program groups). NAITSA is responsible for running the Nest Taphouse Grill, The NAIT Nugget (campus newspaper), campus events, the student health and dental plan, U-Pass and various other services aimed at enhancing student life.

== Techlifetoday magazine ==
Techlifetoday is the polytechnic's official magazine, focusing on people, technology and innovation. It launched in 2007 as techlife, a print magazine. Techlifetoday has published exclusively online since November 2018 and has earned numerous industry awards.

== Organization and administration ==
NAIT's credit programs are organized into seven academic schools and Corporate & Continuing Education. The schools are:

- JR Shaw School of Business
- School of Construction and Building Sciences
- School of Energy and Natural Resources
- School of Health and Life Sciences
- School of Manufacturing and Automation
- School of Media and Information Technology
- School of Transportation

== Notable alumni ==
- Gil Cardinal, filmmaker
- Nolan Crouse (Chemical Technology, Master of Business Administration), former mayor, City of St. Albert, 2007–2017
- Patrick LaForge (Marketing 1974), Edmonton Oilers past president and CEO
- Jarred Land, Red Digital Cinema Camera Company president
- Kevin Martin, Winter Olympic gold medallist curler
- Ian McClelland (Photographic Technology 1965), founder, Colorfast Corporation, former MP for Edmonton Southwest and former MLA for Edmonton-Rutherford
- Bryan Mudryk, TSN SportsCentre anchor
- Doug Pruden (Architectural Technology 1982), world record holder in push-up, holds 9 records
- Vince Steen, Northwest Territories MLA
- Corbin Tomaszeski (Culinary Arts 1992), chef on Food Network's Restaurant Makeover
- Bruce Woloshyn (Radio and Television Arts 1984), visual effects supervisor
- Percy Wickman (Finance 1969), former Edmonton alderman, and former MLA of Edmonton-Whitemud
- Olivia Cheng (Radio and Television Arts), Canadian actress
- Dave Quest (Business Administration 1985), politician, Strathcona-Sherwood Park MLA
- Billy Morin, Indigenous leader, Enoch Cree Nation Chief
- Morris Panych (Radio and Television Arts), Canadian actor and director
- Cathy King (Radio and Television Arts), Gold Medallist curler
- Dave Pettitt (Broadcasting), Canadian actor and voice-over artist
- Barb Higgins (Business Administration and Radio and Television Arts), television news anchor and journalist
- Natasha Staniszewski (Radio and Television Arts 1955), sports reporter and anchor
- Travis Toews (unknown), politician, accountant, rancher, business owner, Minister of Finance of Alberta and President of the Treasury Board.
- Bob McLeod (Administrative Management), politician, Northwest Territories MLA and 12th Premier of the Northwest Territories
- Richard Newman (Radio and Television Arts), broadcaster and writer
- Bol Kong (Radio and Television Arts), professional basketball player with National Basketball League of Canada (NBL) and NBA draft. Named All-Canadian at NAIT.
- Pierre Lueders (unknown), Canadian Olympic athlete, bobsleigh World Cup Champion, and head coach
- David Dorward (unknown), politician, Edmonton-Gold Bar MLA and business owner
- George Rogers (Business Administration with Accounting 1980), politician, Leduc-Beaumont MLA, mayor of Leduc, businessman
- Bob Peterson (Photography 1965), photographer
- Holger Petersen (unknown), businessman, music record producer and radio broadcaster
- Paul Graham, vice-president and executive producer of The Sports Network

== See also ==
- Education in Alberta
- List of colleges in Alberta
- Canadian Interuniversity Sport
- Canadian government scientific research organizations
- Canadian university scientific research organizations
- Canadian industrial research and development organizations
