= Bob Peterson (photographer) =

Canadian photographer

Robert Dale Matt Peterson (born April 14, 1944) is a Canadian photographer and publisher of Paralympics: Where Heroes Come (1988), the first book written about the history of the Paralympic Games.

== Early life and education ==
Peterson was born in Edmonton, Alberta, Canada. He attended the Northern Alberta Institute of Technology, and graduated in 1965 from that institution's first class of photography.

== Career ==
Peterson worked for the Edmonton Journal, CFRN-TV, and as a freelance photographer. He was the Official Photographer for the Edmonton Eskimos football team from 1975 to 1983, and for the Edmonton Drillers soccer team from 1981 to 1982.

Peterson photographed Wayne Gretzky in his first two seasons with the Edmonton Oilers hockey team, first with the World Hockey Association, and then with the National Hockey League. These include shots of Gretzky and Gordie Howe in the 1979 WHA All-Star series, the only time these two ever played together.

He served as Coordinator of Photography for Universiade '83 in Edmonton. He served as Official Photographer for the Canadian Paralympic Committee at the 1988 Seoul Paralympic Games, and for the International Paralympic Committee at the Paralympic Games in Tignes-Albertville in 1992, Atlanta in 1996, and Nagano in 1998.

As a result of his experience with disabled sports at the Paralympics, he published the book Paralympics: Where Heroes Come. The book has been distributed to 69 countries, and with the help of the Franklin Foundation and the Soldier On! program was given to injured Canadian soldiers returning from Afghanistan.

In 2003, Peterson's images were featured in an exhibit titled The Rookie at the Royal Alberta Museum.

In 2019, Peterson donated 9600 images to the Hockey Hall of Fame.

== Publications ==
=== Publications by Peterson ===
- Paralympics: Where Heroes Come. Edmonton, Alberta: One Shot, 1998. Peterson, Cynthia and Robert D Steadward.

=== Publications in which Bob Peterson's photographs have appeared ===
- Cowley, Michael. Sex and the Single Prime Minister. Toronto: Greywood, 1968.
- Jones, Terry. Decade of Excellence. Edmonton, Alberta: Executive Sport Publications, 1980.
- Jones, Terry. The Great Gretzky. Don Mills, Ont.: General, 1980.
- Jones, Terry. The Great Gretzky Yearbook. Don Mills, Ont.: General, 1981.
- Jones, Terry. The Great Gretzky Yearbook II: The Greatest Single Season in Hockey History. Don Mills, Ont.: General, 1982.
- Horton, Marc. Voice of a City: The Edmonton Journal's First Century, 1903 to 2003. Edmonton, Alberta: Edmonton Journal, 2003.
- Kepley, Dan and Jim Taylor. The Edmonton Eskimos: Inside the Dynasty. Toronto: Methuen, 1983.
- Marsh, James. "Wayne Gretzky." The Canadian Encyclopedia. Edmonton, Alberta: Hurtig, 1985.
- Peterson, Cynthia and Robert D. Steadward. Paralympics: Where Heroes Come. Edmonton, Alberta: One Shot, 1998.
- Soviet Life magazine. November, 1984.
- Taylor, Jim. Wayne Gretzky: the Authorized, Pictorial History. Vancouver: Opus Productions, 1994.
- Taylor Jim and Walter Gretzky. Gretzky: from the backyard rink to the Stanley Cup. Toronto: McClelland and Stewart, 1984.
