= Homer Formby =

American businessman

- Born: Homer Aubrey Formby; January 2, 1924; Jacksonville, Florida, U.S.
- Died: May 25, 2013 (aged 89); Kalispell, Montana, U.S.
- Occupation: businessman
- Years active: 1946–1996
- Known for: furniture refinishing, education
- Notable work: Wood And Much Much More
- Spouses: Betty Stokley Formby (m. 1951; div. 1971) Joyce Formby (m. 1972)
- Children: 2

Homer Aubrey Formby (January 2, 1924 – May 25, 2013) was an American craftsman, businessman and pioneer of do-it-yourself (DIY) television. He founded Formbys Inc., which marketed a line of furniture restoration products. Formby made millions and his business was eventually sold to Sherwin-Williams, who discontinued it in 2022.

== Early years ==
Formby was born in 1924 and grew up in Jacksonville, Florida, the third of six children. He was a third-generation craftsman who learned to apply hand-rubbed finishes on fine antiques while working after school in his father’s workshop. His apprenticeship began at age nine. After his service in World War II ended, Formby began working for himself. He had wealthy clients who lived in old plantation homes in South Georgia and North Florida. While traveling in Europe, they purchased antiques and shipped them to Formby for refinishing and repair before delivery to the new owners. He was drawn to Jefferson County for the locally produced Tung Oil, which was used on furniture. He opened an antique shop in the Perkins Opera House building and began selling and restoring furniture. Business was good and he wound up with 40 craftsmen and 17 antique shops across the Southeastern US. If one shop didn't have a desired piece, another would. But he couldn't keep the workers he trained. According to Formby, refinishing at the time was hard work and he was forced to close some shops and expanded his expertise restoring old buildings.

== Turning point ==
At one time, Formby couldn't find skilled craftsmen perform the refinishing, so he was forced to invent a product useable by anyone. Formby spent seven years developing a product that chemically dissolves and removes old varnish and shellac without damaging the wood. One day, he was called away while testing a mixture. When he returned, he found success and began selling his product to antique dealers, then marketing the formula by mail. The mail-order operation became highly successful, allowing him to expand the brand significantly.

== Promotion ==
Formby introduced his new refinishing formula at an Atlanta Rich’s Department store demonstration in 1968. Three thousand people showed up for the three days of demos. The store buyer admitted that no one had ever attracted that many people and gave Formby a $10,000 order. He drew similar crowds at stores in Texas and began selling his product to antique stores and plowing the money back into his new business. In the early 1970s before This Old House became popular, he began hosting the half-hour syndicated series, Formby’s Antique Workshop which lasted for nine years on 200 stations nationwide. He regularly appeared on national talk shows, radio programs, and call-in segments to answer consumer furniture questions. His face anchored his product packaging, making his name synonymous with home wood restoration throughout the 1970s and 1980s. His Southern demeanor and catchphrase,"No one knows wood as good" made him well known in home improvement. He authored instructional publications, including Homer Formby's Guide to Wood and Much, Much More to teach typical homeowners how to care for heirlooms and identify quality antiques.

== Success ==
Sales the first-year garnered $75,000; second year, $750,000; third year was $3 million. In 1973, Formby’s suppliers became unreliable delivering the quantities of chemicals to his remote Monticello location, so the operation was moved to Olive Branch, Mississippi in 1978. Formby purchased a former woodworking plant for a good price and Formby moved to nearby Germantown, Tennessee. He also established a home in Panama City, Florida for his wife Joyce and their antiques. Richardson-Vicks Inc. purchased Formbys Inc. in 1979 for an undisclosed amount with Homer Formby remaining in charge. Formbys Inc. was joined with the Thompson Company (Thompson’s WaterSeal) in 1986 becoming Thompson & Formby Inc. (T&F). After the merger, Formby remained chairman of the board and the public face of the combined company, touring, giving interviews, well into his late 60s. He spent his remaining company years doing commercials and running a call-in helpline to teach consumers how to use both products. He gradually ended his promotional activities when he turned 70.

== Keys ==
Formby and his wife were known as "social fixtures" in the Florida Keys and owned 9 acres (3.6 ha) Little Munson Island and the 100 acres (40 ha) Big Munson Island south of Big Pine Key.

"In 1974, John Spottswood sold Little Munson Island to a Georgia campground owner, County Johnson. Homer Formby, the authority on wood refinishing, wood care and “Refinishing Tips” for 40 years, was the next owner. His better known effort was to provide the island as a home for the “Caribbean Veterinarians Education Trust”, a group of 32 doctors to advance the science of veterinary medicine through research and continuing educational courses and limited research facilities for qualified veterinary professionals." Ben and Lucy Woodson, whom the Formbys knew from Memphis, were the next owners, developed and renamed it Little Palm Island resort.

In late 1982, Formby donated Big Munson Island to the Boy Scouts of America. The barrier island has no permanent structures, electricity or water supply. It became a kayaking destination for Florida National High Adventure Sea Base, located on Islamorada in the keys.

== Non-fiction book ==
- Wood and Much, Much More (1992)
