= Irwin Strifler =

Canadian football player and administrator

Profile
- Position: Fullback

Personal information
- Born: Edmonton, Alberta, Canada
- Listed weight: 195 lb (88 kg)

Career information
- College: Oklahoma State, Cameron
- University: Alberta

Career history

Playing
- 1959–1960: Edmonton Wildcats
- 1960–1961: Cameron Aggies
- 1962–1965: Alberta Golden Bears
- 1965: Calgary Stampeders

Operations
- 1968–1998: NAIT (Athletic Director)

Irwin Strifler is a Canadian former football player and administrator.

Strifler first played for the Edmonton Wildcats from 1959 to 1960. He was then awarded a football scholarship to Oklahoma State University, but instead played with Cameron University, winning the 1961 Junior Rose Bowl. He also played football at the University of Alberta from 1962 to 1965, and basketball from 1962 to 1966. During his years with the Golden Bears football team, he won 3 WIFL championships with the team. Strifler then signed with the Calgary Stampeders of the Canadian Football League in 1965. He was named athletic director of the Northern Alberta Institute of Technology in 1968 and held the position until 1998. He was also a founding member of the Canadian Colleges Athletic Association, serving as their vice-president for two years. Strifler is also a builder, former president, vice president and secretary of the Alberta Colleges Athletic Conference. He was named to the NAIT Wall of Fame in 2003, and the University of Alberta Sports Wall of Fame in 2005. In 2014, he was inducted into the Canadian Colleges Athletic Association Hall of Fame. He is married to Joyce.
