= Olive Branch, Mississippi =

- City
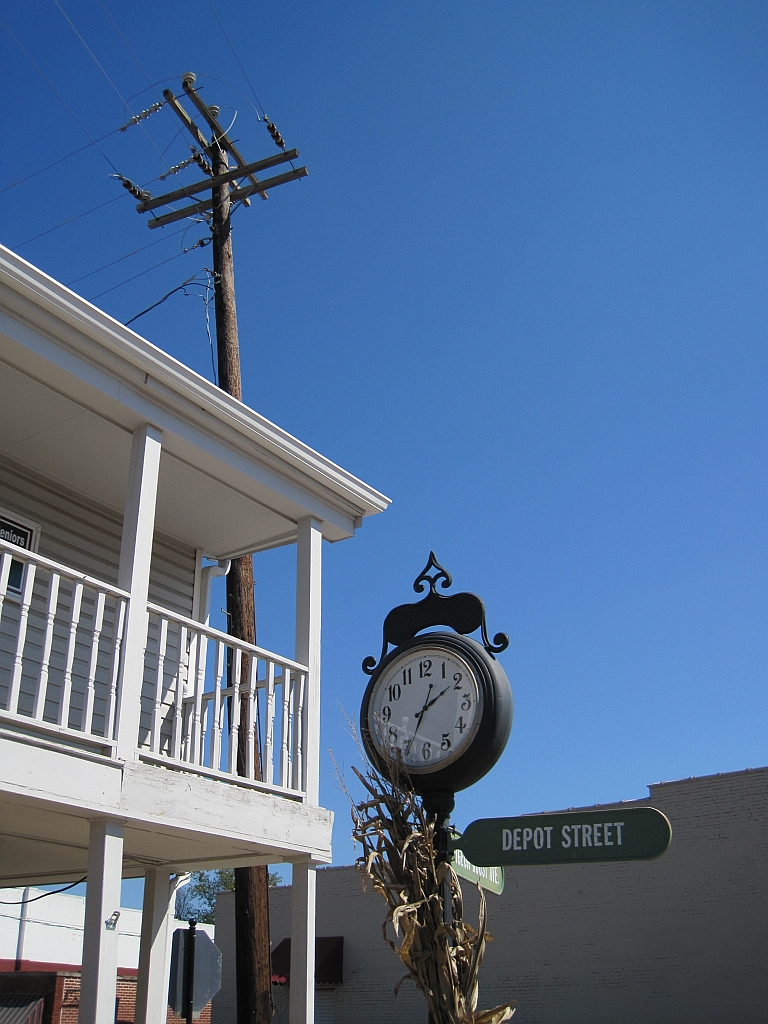
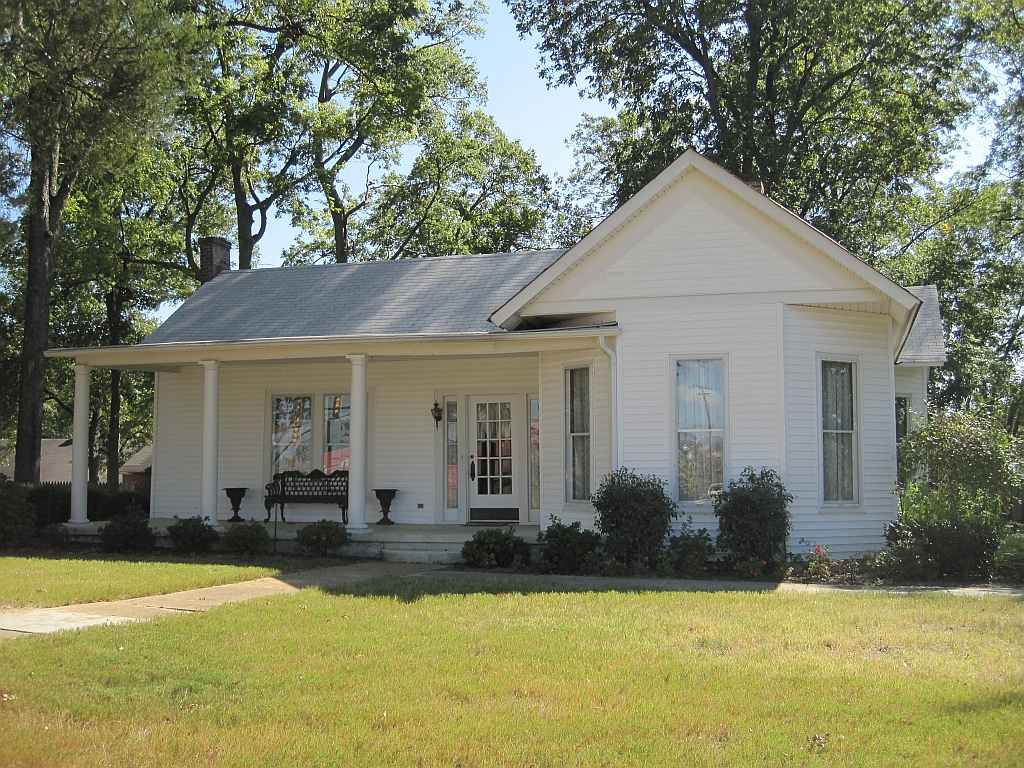
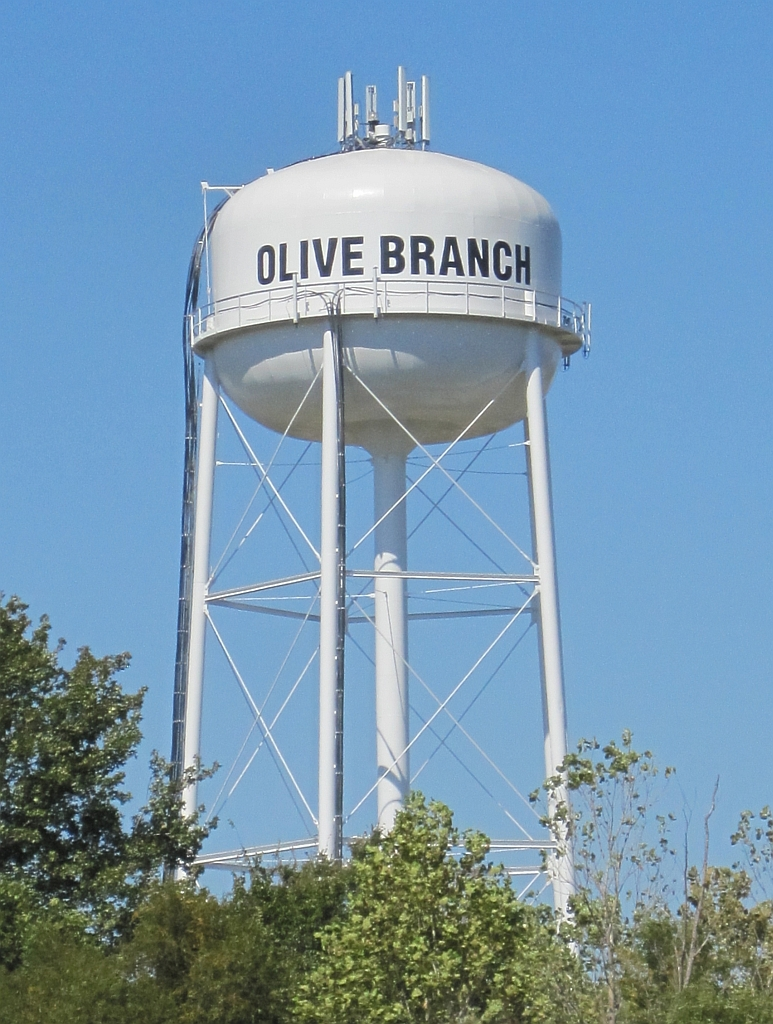
- Downtown Olive Branch Wesson House Olive Branch water tower

- Flag
- Interactive map of Olive Branch, Mississippi
- Location in the United States
- Coordinates: 34°57′37″N 89°50′30″W
- Country: United States
- State: Mississippi
- County: DeSoto
- City: May 1, 1874
- Founder: Stephen Flinn and Milton Blocker

Government
  - Type: Mayor-council
  - Body: Board of Alderman
  - Mayor: Ken Adams (R)

Area
  - Total: 56.05 sq mi (145.17 km^{2})
  - Land: 55.84 sq mi (144.62 km^{2})
  - Water: 0.22 sq mi (0.56 km^{2})
- Elevation: 387 ft (118 m)

Population (2020)
  - Total: 39,711
  - Density: 711.2/sq mi (274.59/km^{2})
- Time zone: UTC−6 (CST)
  - Summer (DST): UTC−5 (CDT)
- ZIP code: 38654
- Area code: 662
- FIPS code: 28-54040
- GNIS feature ID: 2404429
- Website: www.obms.us

Olive Branch is a city located in DeSoto County, Mississippi, United States. With a population of 39,711 at the 2020 census, it is the sixth most populous city in Mississippi. A suburb of Memphis, Olive Branch is part of the Memphis Metropolitan Statistical Area, a region that consists of three counties in southwest Tennessee, five counties in northwest Mississippi, and one county in eastern Arkansas. Along with other rapidly growing places in DeSoto County, Olive Branch attributes most of its growth and development to urban sprawl and flight radiating out from Memphis.

== History ==
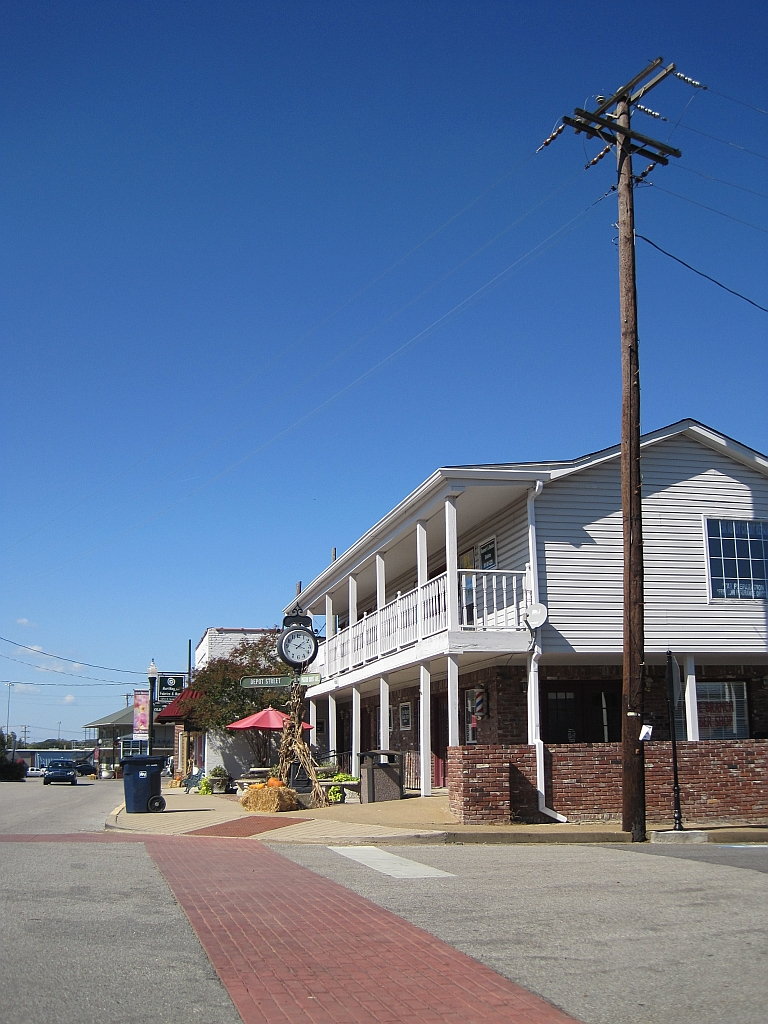
Downtown Olive Branch

Olive Branch, originally named Watson's Crossroad, was established in 1846 near Chickasaw Indian Trails and incorporated in 1873.

=== Early history ===
It was long inhabited by the Chickasaw people, who settled in northern Mississippi, western Tennessee, northwestern Alabama, and southwestern Kentucky, building homes with local materials. They nurtured park-like lands and utilized abundant waterways for sustenance and trade. Governed democratically, minkos (or chiefs in Chickasaw) led councils of elders. The Natchez Trace Parkway and National Scenic Trail protect parts of the historic trading route. European explorers, including Hernando de Soto in the 1500s, encountered Chickasaw communities and made unfavorable impressions. The Chickasaw minko provided supplies but resisted Spanish demands for enslaved laborers, launching an attack. In the 1700s, they allied with the British, notably defeating the French alongside the Choctaw in the Battle of Ackia.

=== 19th and 20th centuries ===
In 1836, among the first permanent settlers in the area were Stephen Flinn and his wife's brother-in-law, Milton Blocker. Blocker acquired his brother-in-law's share of land near Olive Branch, earning him the title “Father of Olive Branch.” Following the Pontotoc Treaty, which allocated specific lands to the Chickasaw, DeSoto County was established in 1836. Blocker paid $1,600 for Sections 34 and 35 from Lush-Pun-Tubby, who shared the story of his tribe's removal during the “Trail of Tears.” Many Choctaw perished on this journey. The Chickasaw resisted removal until 1834, when, despite negotiating with President Andrew Jackson, they were told to move to Indian Territory, leading to the death of Chief Levi Colbert during the journey. Other tribes, such as the Cherokee and Seminole, also faced removal. The Chickasaws signed the Treaty of Doaksville in 1837, which permitted their settlement within the Choctaw Territory. Most relocated between 1837 and 1851, with some remaining until the 1890s. During their settlement, Plains Indian tribes roamed the area, complicating the establishment of the Chickasaw presence. To maintain peace, the federal government constructed Fort Washita and Fort Arbuckle. In 1856, the Chickasaws separated from the Choctaws and established their own constitution. The “Lusher Map,” completed in 1835, was the first detailed depiction of North Mississippi. The first land sale occurred in January 1836, selling nearly a million acres, followed by a second sale of over 2.6 million acres later that year. By 1837, the final surveys of the Cession were completed, and the Pontotoc Land Office, which was crucial to the establishment of North Mississippi counties, closed in 1854, becoming part of Pontotoc. Flinn conveyed the land to Blocker for $6,400 (equal to $206,400 today) in 1840. A small community initially known as "Cowpens" sprang up in the early 1840s. The name was changed to "Watson's Crossroads" in 1842. In 1846, when a post office was established, the name was changed again to "Olive Branch". Frances Wilson Blocker, a descendant of one of the community's founders, suggested the name as a way to symbolize the biblical story of a dove bringing a branch to Noah.

During the American Civil War, forces under Confederate General Stephen D. Lee encamped in and around Ingram's Mill, near Olive Branch. While the forces under Union Colonel George Bryant destroyed the courthouse and the business district of Hernando, Olive Branch suffered no damage from the attack. However, on September 6, 1862, a skirmish broke out involving the 6th Illinois Cavalry Regiment led by Colonel Benjamin Grierson. In 1865, the United States Congress established the Freedmen's Bureau, a program that assisted black and white people in the cities within the South, including Olive Branch, by providing food, clothing, fuel, and legal counsel, along with establishing Mississippi's first public schools. In 1868, Voters approved the state Constitution that formally ended slavery and affirmed Black voting rights, allowing the state to rejoin the Union in 1870. The Mississippi Constitution allows newly freed Black Mississippians the right to learn to read and write. After the war, Olive Branch was one of the voting precincts of DeSoto County before Tate County was formed in 1873. Following Congressional Reconstruction, Black men were given the right to vote. In DeSoto County and all across Mississippi, African Americans have played an active role in democracy, serving as voters and officeholders. At least 226 Black Mississippians held public office during the Reconstruction era. Mississippi has elected its first two Black U.S. senators to Congress. One of them is Hiram R. Revels, the other is Blanche Bruce. A preacher named Jefferson J. Evans, who was born into slavery, was recently elected Sheriff of DeSoto County. Olive Branch was incorporated as a town on April 11, 1873. J. B. Stamps was elected as the first mayor. The Wesson House in Olive Branch, Mississippi, is one of three Dedicated Mississippi Landmarks in Desoto County. Built around 1875 by Ben F. Wesson, it was previously owned by Blocker, who died in 1847. At the first census conducted after incorporation in 1880, the population was 73. Kansas City, Memphis & Birmingham built a railroad line through Olive Branch in 1885, connecting the town to Memphis and Birmingham. The town was officially designated a village on March 6, 1888. In 1875, DeSoto County citizens sent a petition to Mississippi's Republican Governor, Adelbert Ames, for a pardon in a shooting incident, illustrating the charged political environment. Ames had requested federal troops to stop the violence but was denied, allowing white Democrats to terrorize Black voters and drive Republicans from office. In January 1876, the tide turned once again when newly elected white Democrats, who had seized power during county and state elections in 1875 via the Mississippi Plan, began the process of returning Mississippi to a condition of white supremacist control akin to the days of slavery. The end of Reconstruction brought Mississippi into shatters with the implementation of Jim Crow Laws, a set of laws to disenfranchise African Americans and to make racial segregation the law of the land. The gains brought by Black residents in DeSoto County and elsewhere in Mississippi were overturned.

At the turn of the 20th century, nearly 200 people lived in Olive Branch. In the ensuing years, several modern amenities were introduced in the village, including the first cotton gin (1910), a public water system (1922), and electrical service (1927). The Olive Branch School, built in 1908, replaced an overcrowded 1873 building and served as Bethel Township High School while accommodating lower grades. After a fire in 1913, it was rebuilt in 1915 on its original foundation. A new high school was built in 1929, leading to the 1929 school becoming Olive Branch Junior High. Classes continued in the 1908 building until the early 1970s, after which it became a district warehouse. The school's design, by architect Charles Insco Williams, showcases Craftsman style with features like random field stone, stucco, deep eaves, and a low-pitched tile roof. The Olive Branch High School stands as the only remaining historic building on the Tecumseh campus. T.H. Norvell's cheese plant (at the side of present-day Cadence Bank) opened in 1929, becoming the first major industry in Olive Branch. A public sewer system was built, and local streets were paved c. 1940. The village experienced modest growth during the next few decades, rising from 441 in the 1940 census, to 534 in 1950, and 642 in 1960. Growth accelerated in the 1960s, and by 1970 the population had more than doubled to 1,513. The Civil Rights Movement in the American South during the 1950s and 1960s involved a diverse group of people. The movement sought legal enforcement of equality for African Americans that was guaranteed by the U. S. Constitution. At various points between 1954 and 1970, participants in the movement represented all strata of American life. White and Black people joined in the struggle, southerners as well as northerners agitated, Midwesterners and westerners participated, and women, along with men, protested. Elderly and young Americans were active in the movement as well; however, students from middle school through college came to the struggle much later than most. Not until the 1960s did a substantial number of America's youth join and contribute their efforts to the struggle. In 1962, Dr Leslie McLemore was the first African American to vote in DeSoto County. In 1971, a site located a few miles from downtown Olive Branch was chosen as the home of Holiday Inn University and Conference Center. Simultaneous with the construction of the university, Holiday Inn began work on a 3,000-acre (1,200 ha) industrial park. This was followed by the opening of Olive Branch Airport in January 1973. With a runway length of 6,000 feet (1,800 m), it is currently one of Mississippi's five busiest airports for landings and takeoffs. U.S. Highway 78 was built through Olive Branch in 1974. Such developments and infrastructure improvements brought an influx of jobs, industries, and people to DeSoto County and Olive Branch.

The 1990s were a period of explosive growth in the city; 3,567 people lived in Olive Branch at the 1990 census. In 1996, a land annexation to the west doubled the city's total land area. By 2000, the population had risen to 21,054, a 490 percent increase over the 1990 figure.

== Geography ==
Olive Branch is located in northeastern DeSoto County, at the junction of U.S. Route 78, and State Highways 302 (known locally as Goodman Road) and 305 (Germantown Road/Cockrum Street). Via US 78 it is 22 miles (35 km) northwest to the center of Memphis.

The city's northern border is the Mississippi/Tennessee state line. The Memphis city limits touch the western portion of Olive Branch's northern border. The city of Southaven, Mississippi, borders Olive Branch on the west, and unincorporated areas border the city to the east and south.

According to the United States Census Bureau, the city of Olive Branch has a total area of 36.9 square miles (95.6 km^{2}), of which 36.7 square miles (95.0 km^{2}) is land and 0.2 square miles (0.5 km^{2}), or 0.56%, is water.

=== Climate ===
Climate data for Olive Branch, Mississippi (1987-2013)
Month	Jan	Feb	Mar	Apr	May	Jun	Jul	Aug	Sep	Oct	Nov	Dec	Year
Record high °F (°C)	77 (25)	77 (25)	89 (32)	94 (34)	96 (36)	100 (38)	102 (39)	106 (41)	101 (38)	93 (34)	86 (30)	78 (26)	106 (41)
Mean daily maximum °F (°C)	48 (9)	53 (12)	62 (17)	72 (22)	80 (27)	88 (31)	91 (33)	90 (32)	84 (29)	74 (23)	62 (17)	51 (11)	71 (22)
Mean daily minimum °F (°C)	28 (−2)	32 (0)	40 (4)	48 (9)	58 (14)	67 (19)	71 (22)	69 (21)	62 (17)	49 (9)	40 (4)	32 (0)	50 (10)
Record low °F (°C)	6 (−14)	3 (−16)	14 (−10)	26 (−3)	32 (0)	48 (9)	57 (14)	51 (11)	40 (4)	29 (−2)	19 (−7)	−6 (−21)	−6 (−21)
Average precipitation inches (mm)	3.92 (100)	4.39 (112)	5.18 (132)	5.36 (136)	4.97 (126)	4.36 (111)	4.64 (118)	2.52 (64)	3.40 (86)	3.31 (84)	6.10 (155)	5.48 (139)	53.63 (1,363)
Average snowfall inches (cm)	2.2 (5.6)	1.4 (3.6)	0.8 (2.0)	0 (0)	0 (0)	0 (0)	0 (0)	0 (0)	0 (0)	0 (0)	0.1 (0.25)	0.6 (1.5)	5.1 (12.95)
Source 1: Average Weather for Olive Branch
Source 2: NOAA

== Demographics ==
Historical population
Census	Pop.	Note	%±
1880	73		—
1890	199		172.6%
1900	198		−0.5%
1910	221		11.6%
1920	197		−10.9%
1930	336		70.6%
1940	441		31.3%
1950	534		21.1%
1960	642		20.2%
1970	1,513		135.7%
1980	2,067		36.6%
1990	3,567		72.6%
2000	21,054		490.2%
2010	33,484		59.0%
2020	39,711		18.6%
U.S. Decennial Census

=== Racial and ethnic composition ===
Olive Branch city, Mississippi – Racial and ethnic composition Note: the US Census treats Hispanic/Latino as an ethnic category. This table excludes Latinos from the racial categories and assigns them to a separate category. Hispanics/Latinos may be of any race.
Race / Ethnicity (NH = Non-Hispanic)	Pop 2000	Pop 2010	Pop 2020	% 2000	% 2010	% 2020
White alone (NH)	18,105	23,493	21,638	85.99%	69.40%	54.49%
Black or African American alone (NH)	2,369	7,696	13,827	11.25%	22.98%	34.82%
Native American or Alaska Native alone (NH)	37	47	72	0.18%	0.14%	0.18%
Asian alone (NH)	87	434	691	0.41%	1.30%	1.74%
Native Hawaiian or Pacific Islander alone (NH)	1	23	26	0.01%	0.07%	0.07%
Other race alone (NH)	14	40	155	0.07%	0.12%	0.39%
Mixed race or Multiracial (NH)	134	354	1,442	0.64%	1.06%	3.63%
Hispanic or Latino (any race)	307	1,397	1,860	1.46%	4.17%	4.68%
Total	21,054	33,484	39,711	100.00%	100.00%	100.00%

=== 2020 census ===
As of the 2020 census, Olive Branch had a population of 39,711. The median age was 38.8 years. 24.4% of residents were under the age of 18 and 14.9% of residents were 65 years of age or older. For every 100 females there were 89.8 males, and for every 100 females age 18 and over there were 86.1 males age 18 and over.

99.1% of residents lived in urban areas, while 0.9% lived in rural areas.

There were 14,599 households in Olive Branch, of which 36.8% had children under the age of 18 living in them. Of all households, 52.5% were married-couple households, 14.0% were households with a male householder and no spouse or partner present, and 28.4% were households with a female householder and no spouse or partner present. About 22.0% of all households were made up of individuals and 9.4% had someone living alone who was 65 years of age or older. There were 9,645 families residing in the city.

There were 15,542 housing units, of which 6.1% were vacant. The homeowner vacancy rate was 1.0% and the rental vacancy rate was 16.1%.

Racial composition as of the 2020 census
Race	Number	Percent
White	21,944	55.3%
Black or African American	13,881	35.0%
American Indian and Alaska Native	117	0.3%
Asian	696	1.8%
Native Hawaiian and Other Pacific Islander	26	0.1%
Some other race	1,041	2.6%
Two or more races	2,006	5.1%

=== 2010 census ===
As of the 2010 census, there were 33,484 people. The racial makeup of the city was 70.2% White, 23.8% African American, 0.5% Native American, 1.6% Asian, and Hispanic or Latino people were 4.2% of the population. The median income for a household in the city was $69,030, and the median income for a family was $76,270.

== Economy ==
Homer Formby purchased a former woodworking plant in 1978 and moved production of his furniture refinishing products to OB. In 1996, Sherwin Williams acquired the facility on Magnolia Drive and Thompson's WaterSeal was formulated there. The plant was closed in 2009 resulting in a loss of 157 jobs. Many locally owned, small businesses have been operating in Olive Branch for several decades. Examples are Old Style Barbecue and Olive Branch Printing. Several regional businesses, such as BancorpSouth and Holiday Inn, are also located in the area. In 2003, Memphis lost its only permanent indoor ice rink with the closure of the troubled Mall of Memphis. A new rink opened in Olive Branch in August 2011.

== Arts and culture ==
Olive Branch Old Towne features a historic trail, shops, festivals, music events, and a mural project funded by a grant. Olive Branch Arts Council launched Arts in the Alley and mural projects to boost local tourism and businesses.

== Parks and recreation ==
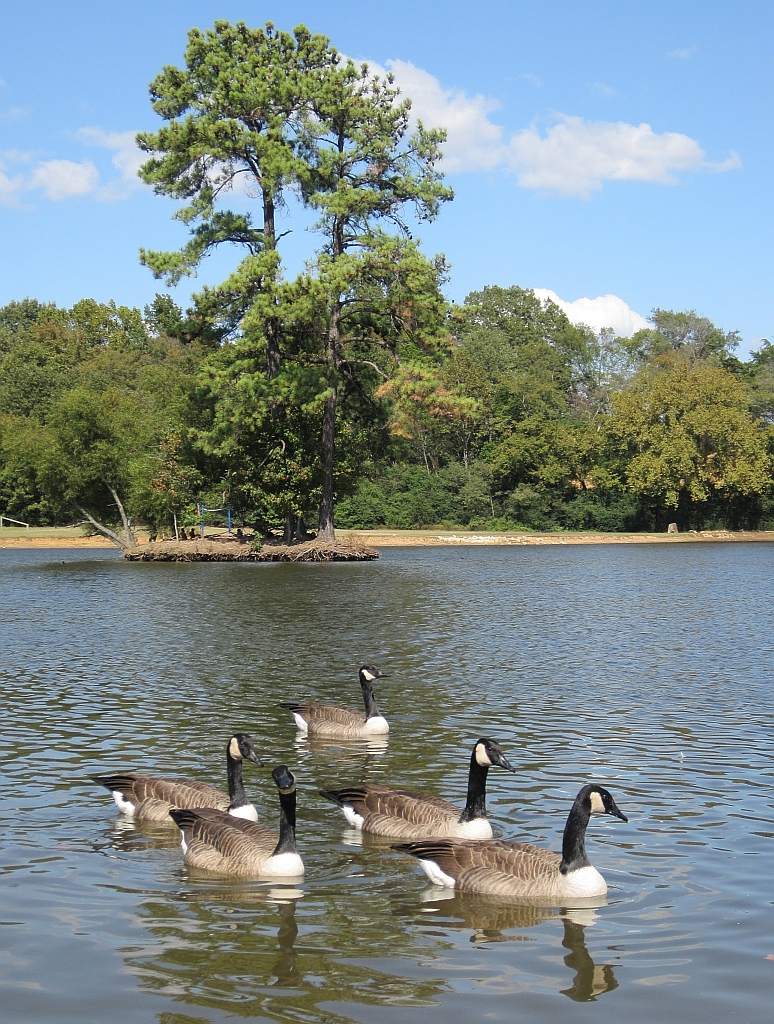
Olive Branch City Park

Olive Branch Parks and Recreation focuses on ensuring citizen participation in leisure activities, maintaining over 140 acres of parks, and enhancing program quality to meet community recreational, cultural, and environmental needs, benefiting all residents.

== Government ==
The mayor of Olive Branch is Ken Adams, a Republican. He has served since July 6, 2021. The city council consists of seven members who are each elected from one of six wards, known as single-member districts, with one alderman being elected at large and representing the entire city.

== Education ==
=== Colleges and universities ===
- Northwest Mississippi Community College

=== Public secondary schools ===
Olive Branch is served by the DeSoto County School District.

- DeSoto County Career and Technology Center East
- Center Hill High School
- Olive Branch High School
- Olive Branch Intermediate School
- Olive Branch Middle School

=== Public elementary schools ===
- Center Hill Elementary School
- Chickasaw Elementary School
- Olive Branch Elementary School
- Overpark Elementary School
- Pleasant Hill Elementary School

=== Private schools ===
- Cross Creek Christian Academy
- Desoto County Academy

== Infrastructure ==
=== Transportation ===
==== Highways ====
- I-269
- I-55
- US 78
- MS 302
- MS 305

==== Major Local Routes ====
U.S. Route 78, which turns into Lamar Avenue after crossing the border in Memphis, Mississippi Highway 302 (MS-302/Goodman Road), and Mississippi Highway 305 (Cockrum Road, Germantown Road) are the main thoroughfares in the Olive Branch area.

==== Railroad ====
A railroad line to Birmingham from Memphis runs through Olive Branch. It is used by BNSF.

R.J. Corman’s Tennessee Terminal performs industrial switching in the Olive Branch industrial park, interchanging with the BNSF Memphis to Birmingham mainline.

==== Mass transit ====
While Olive Branch does not have its own dedicated mass transit system, it is served by the Memphis Area Transit Authority (MATA). MATA provides bus and paratransit services to the surrounding areas, including parts of DeSoto County, where Olive Branch is located. Residents of Olive Branch can access MATA services for transportation within the region and to Memphis.

==== Airport ====
Olive Branch is served by Olive Branch Airport.

== Notable people ==
- Daren Bates, former NFL linebacker
- Charles Boyce, cartoonist, creator of Compu-toon
- Carl Byrum, former NFL running back
- Shon Coleman, former NFL offensive tackle
- Jalen Collins, former NFL, XFL, and Canadian Football League cornerback
- Bernice B. Donald, former federal judge
- Ed Easley, former St. Louis Cardinals catcher
- Andy Fletcher, Major League Baseball umpire
- Mark Guy, former Canadian Football League and Arena Football League wide receiver
- Ricky Stenhouse Jr., NASCAR driver, 2023 Daytona 500 winner
- Marko Stunt, retired professional wrestler
- K. J. Wright, coach and former NFL linebacker
