= Northern Tier (Scouting) =

Scouting America high adventure base in Minnesota and Ontario

- Owner: Scouting America
- Location: Boundary Waters Canoe Area Wilderness; Quetico Provincial Park; Canadian Crown Lands; Atikaki Provincial Wilderness Park
- Country: United States and Canada
- Founded: 1923
- Website www.ntier.org

Northern Tier is a collection of high adventure bases run by Scouting America in the Boundary Waters Canoe Area Wilderness of Minnesota, Ontario's Quetico Provincial Park and Canadian Crown Lands, Manitoba's Atikaki Provincial Wilderness Park, Woodland Caribou Provincial Park, and points beyond.

Northern Tier is the oldest of the four High Adventure bases operated by Scouting America; the other bases currently in operation are Philmont Scout Ranch in New Mexico, Sea Base in the Florida Keys, and Summit Bechtel Reserve in West Virginia. The oldest and largest of the Northern Tier bases is the Charles L. Sommers National High Adventure Base. Central to its program are trips into the Boundary Waters Canoe Area Wilderness (BWCA) and Quetico Provincial Park.

Programs at the Northern Tier vary by season. In the summer, participants undertake wilderness canoe excursions. There are no lodgings along these trips, and aircraft and motorboats are heavily restricted. Typical treks may cover 50 to 150 miles and take 6 to 10 days, with a maximum duration of 14 days. Accompanying each crew is a staff member called an "Interpreter", formerly known as a "Charlie Guide".

== Programs and bases ==
=== Bases ===
Northern Tier consists of the following bases:

- Charles L. Sommers Canoe Base on Moose Lake in Ely, Minnesota offers canoe trips to the Boundary Waters and the Quetico Provincial Park. It is the oldest, largest and most prominent of the Northern Tier bases. Central to its programs is trips into the Boundary Waters Canoe Area Wilderness (BWCA) and Quetico Provincial Park.
- Donald Rogert Canoe Base in Atikokan, Ontario Canada offers canoe trips into the Quetico and Crown Lands.
- Northern Expeditions Canoe Base in Bissett, Manitoba offered canoe trips into the 2.5 million acres combined Atikaki Provincial Park and Woodland Caribou Provincial Park. All trips here started with a float plane trip to the drop off point and canoe cache. Northern Expeditions Canoe Base is currently "closed for the foreseeable future" prior to the 2023 season; all participants with expeditions planned from Bissett received an email that the closure of the local EMS unit forced closure of the base to comply with BSA camping requirements. All 2023 crews were offered accommodation at Donald Rogert Canoe Base.

=== Programs ===
Programs at the Northern Tier vary by season. In the summer, participants undertake wilderness canoe excursions. There are no lodgings along these trips, and aircraft and motorboats are heavily restricted. Typical treks may cover 50 to 150 miles and take 6 to 10 days, with a maximum duration of 14 days. Accompanying each crew is a staff member called an "Interpreter", formerly known as a "Charlie Guide".

Most typical are summer canoe trip programs, signed up as groups. Other programs include:

- Fall Rendezvous offers a chance for crews to experience the Boundary Waters in the fall.
- The National Cold-Weather Camping Development Center is located at the Charles L. Sommers Base. The center provides materials for, and specializes in problems associated with, cold-weather camping for councils and other organizations. In the winter, the Okpik program is offered, with activities such as cross-country skiing, dog sledding, snow shoeing, ice fishing, and shelter building.
- The OA Wilderness Voyage, organized by the Order of the Arrow does work on the portage trails in the Boundary Waters area. In 2009, the program was expanded to include trips into the Quetico.

== History ==
=== History of the Northern Tier High Adventure program ===
The Northern Tier program's founding year is considered 1923, when a canoe trip organized by the Virginia Council led by scout commissioner Carlos S. Chase launched from Winton, MN at St. Croix Lumber and Manufacturing Company. In 1926 it became a BSA Region 10 program and was named Region 10 Canoe Trails. In the early days, there were no permanent structures, and Winton, Minnesota was the launch point. The Winton Resort Hotel became a sort of headquarters but it was mainly a mailing address and a place where Scouts could stay before and after a trip, and the basement was used for some storage. Later the headquarters moved to the Forest Hotel in Ely, but the actual base of operations was an old building in Winton thought to be the power house of a defunct saw mill. By 1932 they contracted with Sigurd Olson to provide canoe outfitting and trip services. Olson was then an outfitter and later became famous as a wilderness advocate and author.

The base of operations moved to Canadian Border Lodge on Moose lake in 1933 and then further east on Moose lake to Hibbard's Lodge. In 1941 the current site on Moose Lake was selected and secured, with construction beginning in December 1941 including a 56' x 36' log lodge built by seven Finnish axemen. The name was later changed to the Region 10 Wilderness Canoe Trails. Soon after, it became the permanent base of operations and was named the Charles L. Sommers Wilderness Canoe Base, taking the name of a Scouter who was the first Chairman of Region 10. Mr. Sommers was an avid Base supporter, canoe trip organizer and participant. However, the name Region 10 canoe base remained in use, including on patches and publications. The name stuck until 1972 when BSA consolidated regions and the base became part of the National High Adventure Program. The name was then changed to the Charles L. Sommers National High Adventure Base. With expansion of the program, Sommers is now part of the Northern Tier High Adventure programs.

The program has a long history with the Ely, Minnesota area. Such famous authors as Sigurd Olson counted themselves as friends of the program.

== Northern Tier Experience ==
What follows is a description of the typical summer program at Northern Tier's Charles L. Sommers Wilderness Canoe Base.

=== Check in ===
Similar to other BSA high adventure bases, an incoming crew will be assigned a staff member, known as an Interpreter, to help them get ready for their expedition. Upon arrival at the base, the crew will meet their interpreter while their leaders check in. After that, the crew will be issued their food and gear. Personal gear is carried in two or three Granite Gear packs. Food and cooking equipment are carried in boxes in specially made packs by Kondos Outdoors in Ely. Tents, paddles, PFDs, and other safety equipment are also issued, and their use is explained by the interpreter or the outfitting staff. Included in the gear is a radio or satellite phone used for emergency communication with base while on the trek. With the help of their interpreter, the crew plans the itinerary for their trip. Unlike treks at Philmont Scout Ranch in New Mexico, there are no pre-assigned routes except for groups staying in the Crown Lands. Crews are then assigned a cabin or a yurt in which to spend their first night. The crew has dinner, participates in an orientation program, and can visit the trading post.

=== On the trail ===
For a crew that is leaving the Sommers base and entering the Quetico Provincial Park, groups often make an effort to finish the 3 hour paddle to reach the Canadian customs office before it closes for lunch. During the summer, the sun comes up at 5:30 am and doesn't go down until about 9:30 pm. Long days are not uncommon.

=== BWCAW vs. Quetico ===
While both areas are designated wilderness areas, Quetico Provincial Park is often considered to be more remote and challenging than the Boundary Waters. The Boundary Waters also receives far more visitors than the Quetico. It is not unusual for crews not to see another person for several days in the Quetico. Whereas the Boundary Waters' portage trails are generally well maintained, Quetico's trails are often unmaintained. This means that in Quetico there are no boardwalks as there are in the BWCAW for swampy portages, and there are fewer park wardens clearing the trails of fallen timber and debris.

Likewise, the campsites are rather different between the two wilderness areas. Boundary Waters' campsites have designated fire grates in the fire ring and a small unenclosed fiberglass latrine "throne" set back in the woods. Quetico's campsites are far less used than BWCAW and many are not marked on maps. The sites themselves do not have a latrine (participants must dig a cat-hole at least 150 feet away from water and camp) nor do they have a fire grate.

=== Return to base ===
Upon returning to the base at the completion of their journey, crews return the gear issued to them and retrieve personal items. In the evening, crews enjoy an outdoor barbecue followed by a show put on by camp staff consisting of skits and songs, known as "Rendezvous." In between these events, crews may avail themselves of the base amenities: sauna, toilets, hot showers, a sweet shop, and a trading post.

== Wilderness Grace ==
Participants recite an adapted version of the Wilderness Grace. The summer version is as follows:

For food, for raiment,
For life and opportunity,
For sun and rain,
For water and portage trails,
For friendship and fellowship,
We thank thee, O Lord.
Amen.

The winter version replaces "rain" with "snow" and "water and portage trails" for "ice and ski trails."

== Alumni association ==
The Charles L. Sommers Alumni Association, Inc. (SAA) was incorporated as a non-profit corporation in 1992. The founders included former volunteers and staff members and supporters of the Northern Tier National High Adventures and Scouting. Their mission is to “provide a continuing interest in and support for the mission and programs of the Charles L. Sommers National High Adventure Base and the Northern Tier National High Adventure Program”.

== See also ==
- Scouting in Minnesota
