= Summit Bechtel Reserve =

Scouting America high adventure base in West Virginia

- Location within West Virginia
- Owner: Scouting America
- Location: Glen Jean, West Virginia
- Country: United States
- Coordinates: 37.91°N 81.11°W
- Founded: 2010
- Website https://summitbsa.org

The Summit Bechtel Family National Scout Reserve, often shortened to Summit Bechtel Reserve (SBR) or The Summit, is a High Adventure base owned by Scouting America and located in Fayette and Raleigh counties, near Beckley, West Virginia. It comprises the Paul R. Christen National High Adventure Base, James C. Justice National Scout Camp, and John D. Tickle National Training and Leadership Center. The reserve is over 14,000 acres (22 sq mi) in size and is the current home of the National Scout Jamboree.

The Summit is one of Scouting America's four high adventures bases, the others being Philmont Scout Ranch in New Mexico, Northern Tier in Minnesota, as well as Manitoba and Ontario in Canada, and Sea Base in the Florida Keys, as well as The Bahamas and United States Virgin Islands.

== Inauguration ==
On November 18, 2009, the BSA announced the acquisition of the property comprising the main 10,600-acre site of what is now the Summit Bechtel Reserve. Its acquisition was made possible through a donation from the Stephen D. Bechtel, Jr. Foundation. The $50 million donation is the largest in the history of the BSA.

On October 22, 2010, the BSA announced that total donations had reached $100 million, including a $25 million donation from the Suzanne and Walter Scott Foundation. Both Stephen Bechtel and Walter Scott, Jr. are recipients of the Distinguished Eagle Scout Award. October 22 is also the day the BSA announced the dates of the 2013 National Scout Jamboree and the day ground was broken at SBR with 22 golden shovels. The Scott funds funded the building of the Scott Scouting Valley and the Scott Visitor Center. Another gift from T. Michael and Gillian Goodrich led to the creation of centerpiece lake on the main site property now known as Goodrich Lake. Mike Goodrich is also a Distinguished Eagle Scout Award recipient.

The Summit Bechtel Reserve is located adjacent to the New River Gorge National Park and Preserve. Managed by the National Park Service, the National River comprises approximately 70,000 acres (280 km^{2}) that exemplifies the typically rugged Appalachian Mountains, and is a popular whitewater rafting, mountain biking, rock climbing, and tourism destination. It is also the home of the New River Gorge Bridge, which hosts an annual base jumping event each October.

The current goals of construction at the site are developing infrastructure and providing access to the area's resources for outdoor activities. The Summit is expected to inject $25.3 million into the local economy annually.

== Inception ==
Plans for The Summit began in 2007 when BSA leadership began looking for a permanent location for the National Scout Jamboree, which had been held at Fort A.P. Hill, Virginia since 1981 as well as seeking another high adventure base for the large number of Scouts who are wait-listed at the other three high adventure camps every year. A committee in charge of site selection and project planning was created. The committee named the new venture Project Arrow, chaired by Jack D. Furst. Plans for Project Arrow grew to include not only a venue for the Jamboree, but also for a Scout camp, a high adventure base, and a training and leadership center, all housed on the same contiguous property.

More than 80 sites in 28 states were visited over an 18-month span and inspected as possible locations for the new venue. The top fifteen sites were visited in October 2008 and the list was cut to three final sites: Saline County, Arkansas; Goshen, Rockbridge County, Virginia; and the New River region of West Virginia. In February 2009 Arkansas was cut from the list, leaving Virginia and West Virginia. On August 4, 2009, the BSA announced it was no longer considering the Virginia site and was looking into the feasibility of the West Virginia site becoming the sole site for all purposes.

On November 18, 2009, the BSA announced that it had chosen the West Virginia site, known locally as the Garden Ground Mountain property, as the future home of the Summit Bechtel Reserve.

One of the deciding factors for Project Arrow in choosing the West Virginia site was its adjacency to New River Gorge National River. More than 13 miles of the property borders the park, giving Scouts and Scouters access to the more than 70,000 acres of managed wilderness beyond the Reserve's property.

On April 1, 2012, Justin D. (Dan) McCarthy was appointed Summit Group Director. He is responsible for all aspects of the operation of the Reserve. McCarthy is a retired Vice-Admiral of the U.S. Navy and served as Deputy Chief of Naval Operations for Fleet Readiness and Logistics. A lifelong scouter, McCarthy received the Silver Buffalo Award, the BSA's highest volunteer recognition, in May 2012.

== Location ==
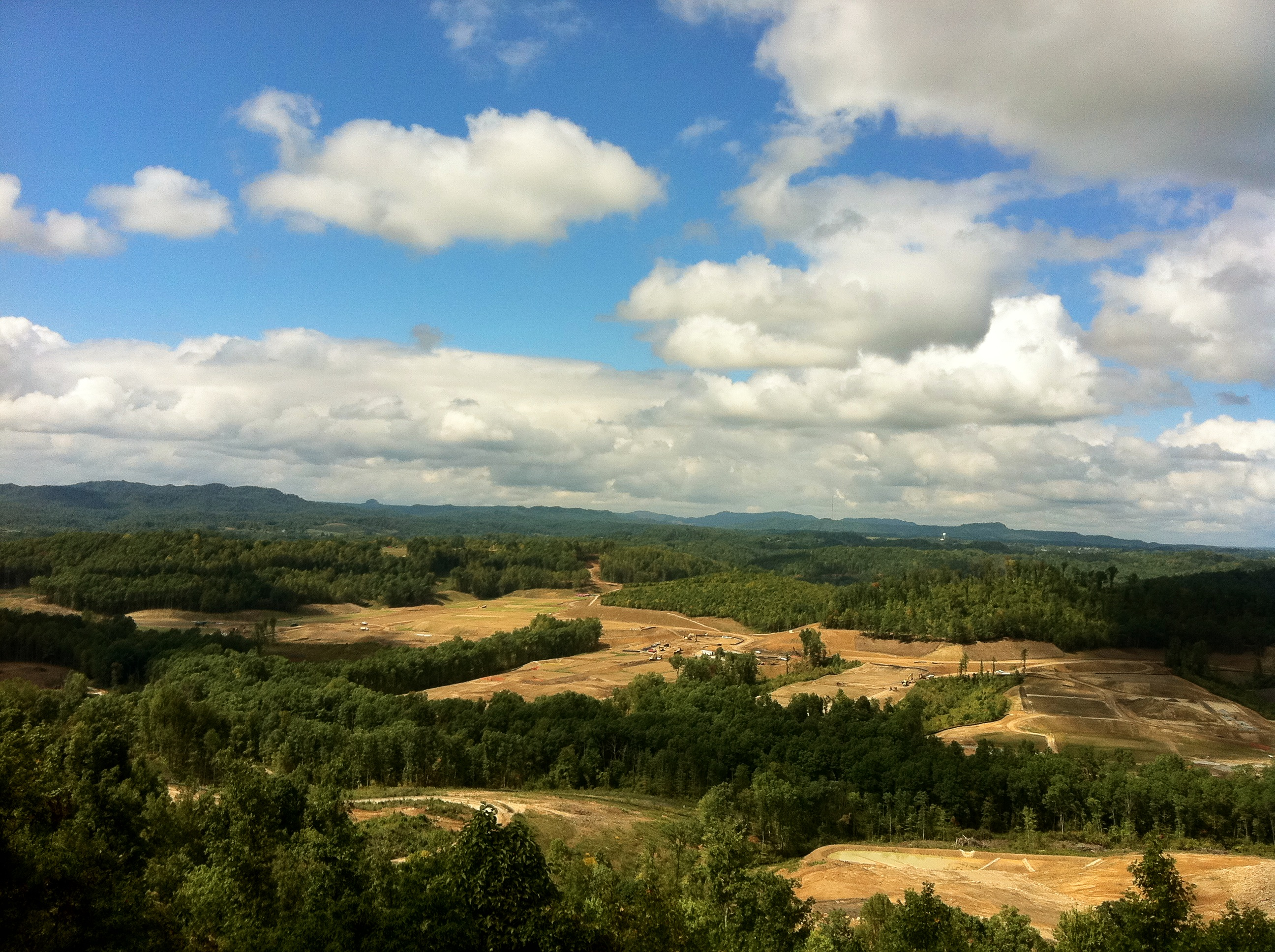
Overlook of the Summit site, cleared out before general construction in 2011.

The Summit Bechtel Family National Scout Reserve is in southern West Virginia bordering the New River Gorge National River. Approximately 11,400 acres (46 km^{2}) of the property are in Fayette County. The remaining roughly 2,600 acres (11 km^{2}) are in Raleigh County. The property borders the communities of Glen Jean, McCreery, Thurmond, and Mount Hope. To the south is the city of Beckley and to the north is the city of Oak Hill and the town of Fayetteville. To the northwest is Charleston, the state capital.

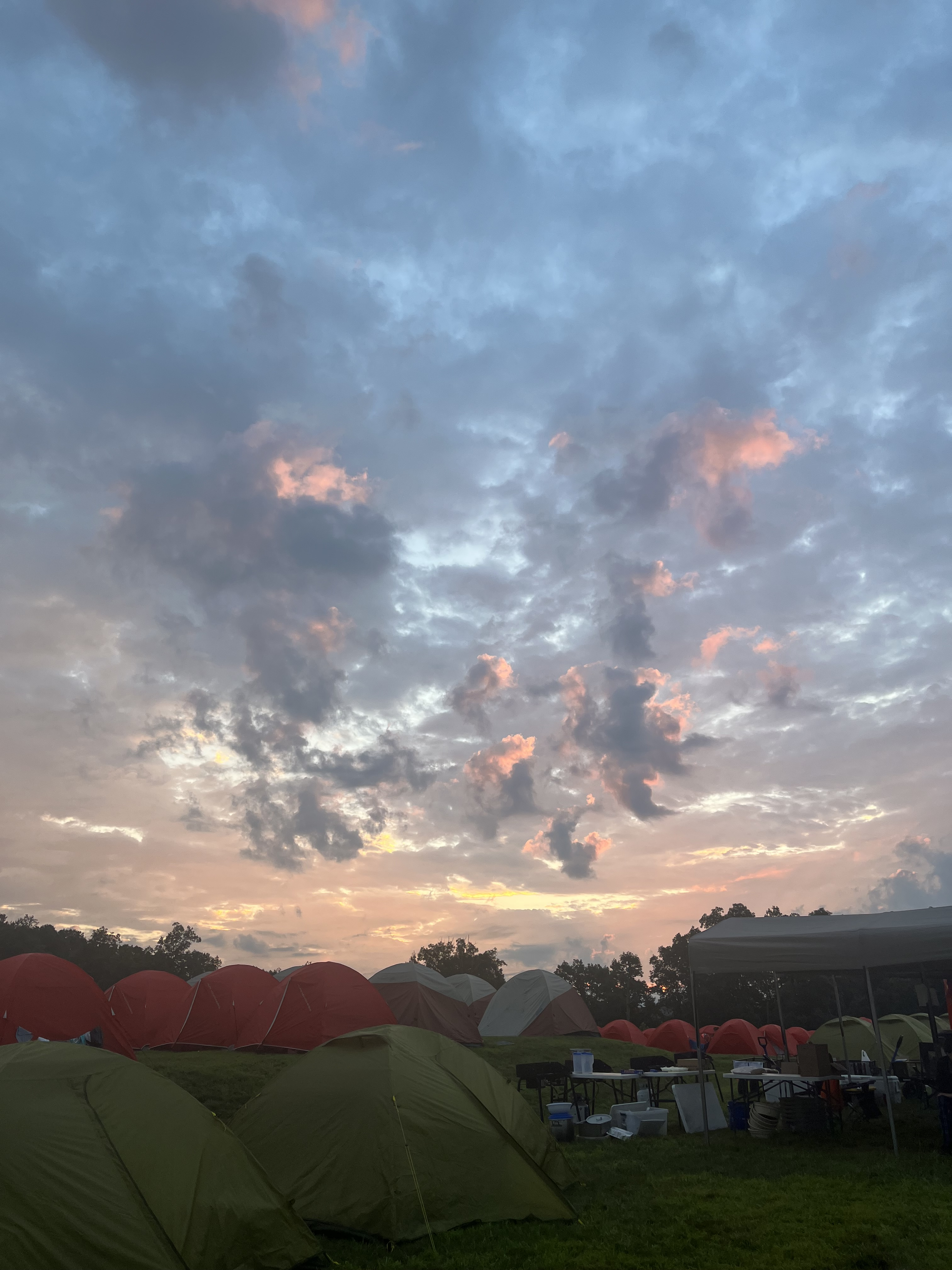
Sunrise at Summit Betchel Reserve

== Features ==
The Summit Bechtel Family National Scout Reserve has three main components of activity: the Paul R. Christen National High Adventure Base, the James C. Justice National Scout Camp, and the John D. Tickle Training and Leadership Center, each of which has unique program opportunities. There are six subcamps named based on the NATO Phonetic Alphabet, which have the capacity to house up to 40,000 campers, a large outdoor arena with a capacity of approximately 80,000, and ten district adventure areas covering mountain biking, BMX, skate boarding, archery, rifle & shotgun shooting, zip lines, canopy tours, challenge courses, climbing & rappelling. Operating principles of The Summit Bechtel Reserve are centered on four core values: Leadership, Adventure, Service, and Sustainability.

The SBR property was once the site of extensive coal mining, an industry for which the state of West Virginia is known. The remnants of long abandoned surface mines within the property have created wide flat areas that tier the terrain into a series of benches, effectively pre-grading and excavating the property, and allowing for many of the roads and infrastructure on the property to begin construction with manageable earth moving.

Sections of the property contain large flat areas engineered to accommodate regional camp headquarters and sub-camps. The sub-camp farthest from The Summit's core area is 1.3 miles (2.1 km), with an elevation gain of no more than 300 feet (91 m). Pedestrian pathways reduce walking times from base camps to the core activity center to 12–15 minutes.

A permanent arena on the far side of the valley seats 6000 to 8000 people, built as a natural extension to the property's lower bowl amphitheatre section, for a total arena area large enough for 80,000 people during national Scout jamborees.

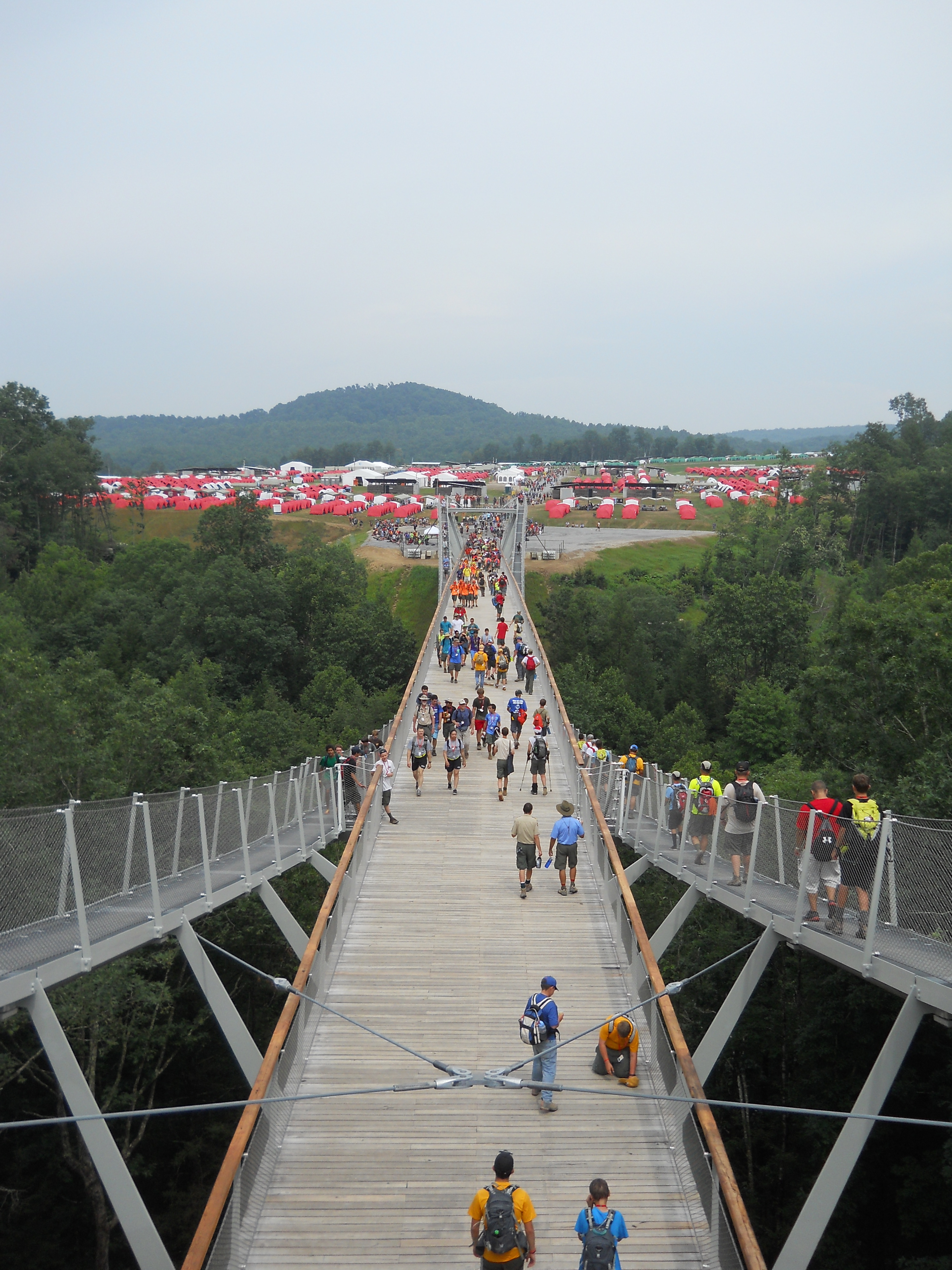
Consol Energy Wing Tip Footbridge at The Summit, viewed from one of three observation points; two on opposite sides and one underneath the bridge.

A lake at the center of the main site separates base camps from the arena, action areas, transportation centers, and other traditional core areas. A valley on the Summit property is crossed by a triple-walkway pedestrian suspension bridge sponsored by CONSOL Energy. The bridge is just shy of 800 feet (240 m) in length, and was made possible by the $15 million donation of CONSOL. The bridge connects the western and eastern portions of the core areas of the property.

High Adventure Areas constructed on the property include: The Park (skateboarding), The Trax (BMX), The Pools (scuba and swimming), The Cloud (popular science & robotics), The Bows (archery sports), The Barrels (shooting sports), The Ropes (challenge courses in the trees), the Rocks and Boulder Cove (climbing, bouldering, and rappelling), The Zip (zipline), Low & High Gear (mountain bike headquarters locations connecting over 36 miles of downhill and cross country mountain bike trails), The Canopy (canopy tours), and 'sampler' activities available within The Scott Summit Center.

ArcGIS Online supports the SBR's geospatial initiatives, including deployment of mobile and web applications. A Geographic Information System is a system designed to capture, store, manipulate, analyze, manage, and present all types of geographical data. Example applications that utilize the ArcGIS Platform supported at SBR include a 'story map', the SBR web map utilized for navigation during the 2013 National Jamboree, and a 'swipe map' comparing 2011 to 2013 development.

The SBR property also contains the Thomas S. Monson Leadership Excellence Complex, which house several training and leadership components on the main site as construction progresses.

== Bechtel family ==
Stephen D. Bechtel, Jr. is the grandson of Warren A. Bechtel, founder of the Bechtel Corporation, the largest civil engineering company in the United States. He took over as manager of the company in 1960 at the age of 35 and retired in June 1990. He is an Eagle Scout.

The S. D. Bechtel, Jr. Foundation and the Stephen Bechtel Fund, both family foundations, provide support to certain non-profit organizations that address challenges to the economic welfare of the United States.

Program areas supported by the foundations include science, technology, engineering, and math (STEM) Education, environment, character and citizenship development, and preventive healthcare and selected research.

The Bechtel Foundation donated $50 million to the BSA to help the Arrow Project purchase and develop the land that is now The Summit Bechtel Family National Scout Reserve.

== Jamborees ==
Original logo at time of first Jamboree held there

Since its inception, the largest construction focus of the Arrow Project was preparing The Summit Bechtel Family National Scout Reserve property for the 2013 National Scout Jamboree, which was held July 15–24, 2013.

The Jamboree saw over 56,000 participants and guests over the course of 10 days for the event. SBR became the third-largest city in West Virginia during the event. 2013 was the inaugural Jamboree held at SBR. All future BSA Jamborees will be held there.

The site has hosted the 2017 National Scout Jamboree and the 24th World Scout Jamboree in 2019, the latter having been co-hosted by Scouts Canada, Boy Scouts of America, and Asociación de Scouts de México.

The 2021 National Scout Jamboree was cancelled due to the COVID 19 Pandemic. It was rescheduled for 2023.

The site hosted the 2026 National Scout Jamboree from 22 July to 31 July. The Jamboree was held during the 250th anniversary of American Independence.

=== List of Jamborees at the Bechtel Summit ===
Year	Event	Dates	Attendance
2013	National Scout Jamboree	July 15–24, 2013	40,795
2017	National Scout Jamboree	July 19–28, 2017	35,000
2019	24th World Scout Jamboree	July 22–August 2, 2019	45,000
2023	National Scout Jamboree	July 19–28, 2023	15,000
2026	National Scout Jamboree	July 22–31, 2026	12,000

== BSA National high adventure bases ==
The Paul R. Christen National High Adventure Base at The Summit Bechtel Family National Scout Reserve, established in 2014, is the BSA's seventh consecutive and fourth operating national high adventure base program. The three currently operating programs are the Philmont Scout Ranch in New Mexico, the Northern Tier National High Adventure Base in Minnesota, and the Florida National High Adventure Sea Base in Islamorada, Florida. Discontinued programs include the Northern Wisconsin National Canoe Base in Wisconsin, Maine National High Adventure in Maine, and the Land Between the Lakes National Outdoor Adventure Center in Kentucky.

With the addition of The Summit Bechtel Reserve's Paul R. Christen National High Adventure Base as the newest high adventure base, participants will be exposed to programs unique to the New River Gorge region. The region offers white water rafting rated from Class II to Class V along the more than 50 miles of river within the New River Gorge National River area. Other outdoor activities that are popular to the area include Rock climbing, rappelling (abseiling), mountain biking, hiking, geocaching, and orienteering. Some of the additional activities added with help from Scout feedback at the 2010 Jamboree, are skateboarding, freestyle BMX, mountainboarding, ATV riding, paddleboarding, dragon boat racing, and zip-lining.

== Other uses ==
West Virginia University Institute of Technology, located in Beckley, uses the Summit Bechtel Reserve as the home facility for their men's and women's cross country team.

As well, Summit allows outside organizations to host retreats at the hotel and hall located on the premise.
