= Sea Base =

Scouting America high adventure base in Florida

- Previous name: Florida National High Adventure Sea Base
- Owner: Scouting America
- Location: Florida Keys
- Country: United States
- Coordinates: 24.8515°N 80.7383°W
- Founded: 1980
- Founder: Sam Wampler
- Website www.seabaseha.org

Sea Base, formerly known as Florida National High Adventure Sea Base, is a high adventure base run by Scouting America in the Florida Keys. Its counterparts are Philmont Scout Ranch in northern New Mexico; Northern Tier in Ely, Minnesota, as well as Manitoba and Ontario in Canada; and Summit Bechtel Reserve near the New River Gorge National Park in southern West Virginia.

The main Sea Base is located in Islamorada, Florida, on the end of Lower Matecumbe Key. Other bases include the Brinton Environmental Center located on Summerland Key (which oversees Big Munson Island located 5.5 miles southeast of the center), the Bahamas Sea Base in Marsh Harbour, Abaco, Bahamas, and the U.S. Virgin Islands Sea Base in St. Thomas.

== Early history ==
In 1928, the Sea Base property was the site for the first ferry terminal in the original overseas highway. Cars would board the boat and travel to No Name Key, where the road would continue. The Terminal Lunch stand, later called the Ferry Slip Cafe opened around the same time. In the Early 1930s, the property was known as WPA camp number 3. WPA workers were building a new highway parallel to the Overseas Railroad. The 1935 Labor Day Hurricane changed everything. The entire camp was destroyed in the storm. Most of the workers who lived at the camp were World War I veterans. Many of the workers were being evacuated to Homestead when their rescue train was washed off the tracks on Upper Matecumbe Key. Over 450 people died in the Islamorada area during the hurricane. The evidence of the workers' progress is still evident today. Veterans Key, in front of Sea Base's marina, is a man-made island made for a highway right-of-way. 8 bridge pilings protrude out of the water about a quarter of a mile west of veterans Key, for a bridge that was to connect Lower Matecumbe Key and Jewfish Bush Key and was never built.

The new Overseas Highway completed in 1938, included a toll house on the current location of Sea Base's commissary. The toll was removed in 1954. The Ferry Slip Cafe became the Toll Gate Inn and it was owned by local shark fisherman, Wynn Tyler. The Toll Gate Inn was a 10-room motel, a bar, restaurant, marina, and gas station. The marina was dredged in the early 1950s, at the same time that most of the canals in Lower Matecumbe Key were dredged out.

== New beginning ==
In 1974 a handful of volunteers from Miami, Florida and Atlanta, Georgia came together to develop a high adventure program using the waters in and around the Florida Keys as their foundation. The BSA National High Adventure chairman, John R Donnell Sr, asked the then Camping Director of the South Florida Council, Sam Wampler, to coordinate trips to Freeport in The Bahamas. Sam, using his station wagon and a warehouse, operated this program until 1979. The original Florida Gateway High Adventure committee members were Paul Benedum, John R Donnell Sr., Spurgeon Gaskin, Ernie Jamison, and chairman Charlie Topmiller. In 1977 over 700 participants were in the program, urging the Florida Gateway committee to look for a permanent location for a camp. The Florida Keys Adventure was operated in the former Malibu Lodge on Lower Matecumbe Key in 1977-1978. Under Wampler's leadership, the National Council received a 1.3-million-dollar grant from the Fleischmann Foundation. Following some extensive research, the Old Toll Gate Motel and Marina and 6.3 acres (25,000 m^{2}) was purchased in 1979 at a cost of $800,000. The remaining $500,000 was used to construct the sailing dorms, the quarterdeck, general manager's residence, to repair to the T-dock, purchase a SCUBA compressor, and renovate the restaurant to a dining hall and office.

== Florida Gateway High Adventure Base ==
The camp began small, but started growing immediately. The former Land Between the Lakes National High Adventure Base contributed a couple of canoes, a pontoon boat, some office equipment and one employee, Stu Cottrrell, who became the first program director. The Florida Gateway High Adventure Base opened on May 15, 1980. 800 Scouts attended the first summer. By 1982 construction and renovation was complete and the name was changed to the Florida National High Adventure Sea Base. In December 1982, the National Council of the Boy Scouts of America was given Big Munson Island from Homer Formby. Big Munson is an untouched, uninhabited island over 100 acres (0.40 km^{2}) in size, located off Big Pine Key in the lower Keys. It is now used for the Out Island Program, and as a part of the Key Adventure Program. In 1984 the new Scuba pools were dedicated, and in 1987, more land was purchased for future expansion.

== Expansion ==
Since that original gift, there have been several other grants and purchases which have allowed the base to grow. In 1991, the hurricane proof Scuba dorms were completed. John W and Tommie M Thomas made a gift of $70,000 to Sea Base for new staff and conference housing, the Thomas Building that was dedicated on May 15, 1992. A new interfaith chapel was dedicated in 1993. In 1994 the galley was remodeled again, and was subsequently renamed the Donnell Center, after John Donnell, Sr. Also in 1994 the first Corinthian 45 dive boat, the BSA Tarpon joined the fleet. With generosity from Union Pacific CEO Drew Lewis, a new administration building, dedicated to William L Adams, opened May 3, 1995. After a donation by Frank Heckrodt in 1998, a second Corinthian 45, the BSA Scoutmaster was purchased. In 2001 a new maintenance shop was finished. Sea Base was not done growing; a new facility was in the works. As a result of a $7 million donation from the Brinton Trust, The Brinton Environmental Center opened June 1, 2001. The center is named after J. Porter Brinton, the project's benefactor. The Brinton Center is located at mile marker 23 and it became the base of operations for Scouts going to Big Munson Island.

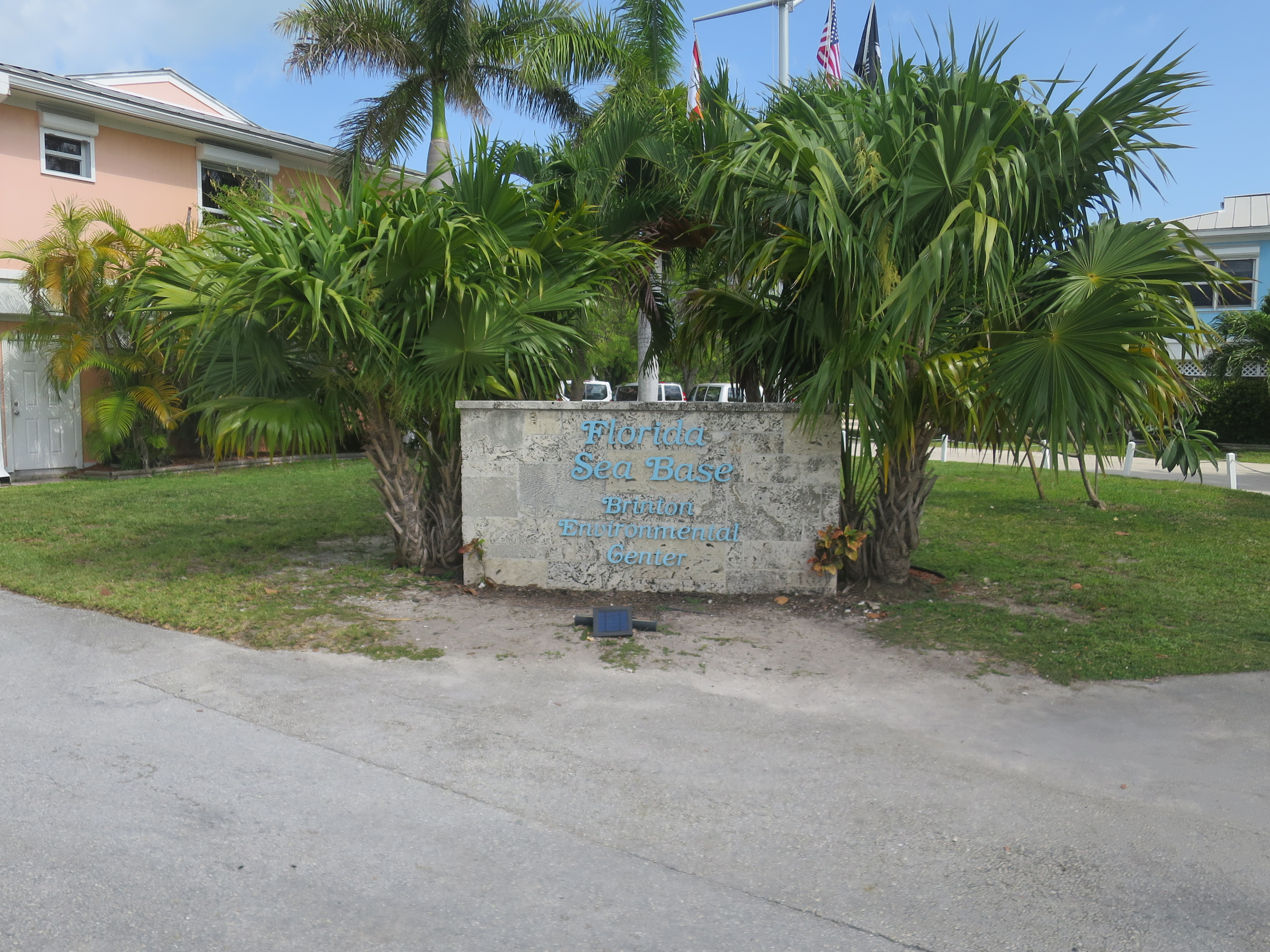
Brinton Environmental Center Sea Base sign.

== Today ==
Many of the Toll Gate Inn's original buildings are still a part of Sea Base. The motel is now called the Annex and houses seasonal staff. The bar and restaurant is now the galley, and the gas station is now used as the commissary.

The Sea Base Fleet includes 16 26-foot (8 m) Dusky drive boats, a 33-foot (10 m) Dusky fishing boat, two 18 ft (6 m) flats skiffs, six 46-foot (14 m) Newton Dive boats, two Corinthian 45-foot (14 m) dive boats and many charter sailboats.

== See also ==
- Scouting in Florida
- Florida Keys
