= Okpik =

Boy Scouts of America program

- Owner: Boy Scouts of America
- Location: Northern Tier National High Adventure Bases
- Country: United States of America
- Awarded for: Cold-weather camping

Northern Tier National High Adventure Base
47.989827, -91.49368422

Okpik, (Inuit language for snowy owl) pronounced as (OOk' pick) is the Scouting America cold-weather adventure program created by their Northern Tier High Adventure Bases at the Charles L. Sommers Canoe Base in Ely, Minnesota.

As the result of Northern Tier's Cold Weather Training program that teaches leaders to develop their own cold-weather program there are similar programs named after and based on Okpik offered by Scouting America councils nationally. For example, Tahosa High Adventure Base located near Ward, Colorado offered a course based on the Okpik weekend program; Camp William Hinds in Raymond, Maine offers a popular Okpik program as well. Philmont Scout Ranch, another National High Adventure Base, offers a similar cold weather camping program called Kanik. Several local councils of Scouting America have named their own local winter camping programs under the Okpik name, using the Okpik: Cold-Weather Camping manual, such as ones in Michigan, Buffalo, New York, the Blackhawk Area Council in Illinois and the Greater St. Louis Area Council in Missouri and the Potawatomi Area Council in Wisconsin.

== History ==
Since the early 1970s, the Charles L. Sommers Canoe Base has provided training in cold-weather camping and winter survival, while providing a place for cross-country skiing, ice-fishing, and other activities in the snow. In the early days, the Okpik program was teamed up with the United States Armed Forces who used the base during the week for cold weather survival training. On weekends, the Scouts would come to the base for a three-day camping experience.

== Programs ==
=== Cold weather training ===
From January 8 to 13, older Scouts and leaders interested in learning how to develop and run a winter program for their unit or council can attend a five-day Cold Weather Training Course. The Okpik staff trains participants in the skills of safe cold weather camping and the sharing of resources among participants, with emphasis on leadership and working with young people in a cold weather environment. Winter logistics and the safety of all participants are points of emphasis.

=== Weekends ===
The weekend program is the oldest Okpik program. From Friday evening through Sunday, participating groups receive instruction in the basic skills of winter camping and have the opportunity to practice them on an overnight campout. Training in cold weather dress, first-aid, menu and equipment are included in indoor sessions. Opportunities are also available for activities in winter ecology, igloo building, and other cold weather activities. Extra days can be added for school planning days and the Martin Luther King Jr. Day holiday.

=== Holiday stay ===
Between Christmas and New Year's Day Scouts and Venturers from further away can expand their outdoor program into the north woods winter. With the help of instructors and the extensive outfitting capabilities of the program, novice groups have the opportunity to enjoy skiing, snowshoeing, and other activities.

=== Musher Camp ===
Those attending Musher Camp learn about dog sledding. Participants stay in heated Musher Camp "yurts" located next to the dog yard at Okpik base camp. Staying in a quinzhee (snow dome) is an option. Participants learn how to train, care for, harness, and run sled dogs. Participants have the opportunity to mush his or her own team on wilderness day trips or by visiting other Okpik crews and sharing their expertise at dog sledding. Musher Camp programs are limited to at least a three-day trek.

=== Skiing, snowshoeing, and dog sled treks ===
Participants ski, snowshoe, or have a dog sled transport their gear while they ski along to a distant backcountry site. These programs are for older (14-years old by the day of arrival) Scouts who can spend at least two nights on the trail.

=== Cabin stay ===
This program is for younger Scouts that are accompanying a group of older Scouts, or visiting Okpik on their own. This program includes skiing, snowshoeing, dog sled rides, and other winter activities. The group will stay in heated cabins and cook their meals outside. This program is open to any registered Scout youth member.
