= Al Beaton =

Canadian editorial cartoonist (1923–1967)

- Born: Allan Beaton; 1923; Vancouver, British Columbia, Canada
- Died: August 24, 1967 (aged 43–44); Algonquin Provincial Park, Ontario, Canada
- Education: British Columbia School of Art
- Employer(s): The Province; Toronto Telegram
- Known for: Editorial cartooning, comic strips
- Notable work: Ookpik

Allan "Al" Beaton (1923 – August 24, 1967) was a Canadian editorial cartoonist and comic-strip artist. He worked for the Vancouver newspaper The Province and later served as the principal editorial cartoonist for the Toronto Telegram. He also created Ookpik, a comic strip based on the Canadian Arctic owl handicraft figure.

== Career ==
Beaton was born in Vancouver in 1923 and served overseas with the Royal Canadian Air Force during the Second World War. After the war, he attended the British Columbia School of Art. In 1953, he joined The Province as an editorial cartoonist.

Beaton joined the Toronto Telegram on May 27, 1961. He encouraged fellow newspaper artist Andy Donato to try editorial cartooning, and Donato occasionally substituted for him. Beaton's comic strip Ookpik was syndicated to approximately 50 Canadian and American newspapers during the 1960s. He discontinued the strip in 1966 after doctors advised him to reduce his workload.

Beaton died of a heart attack while visiting Algonquin Provincial Park on August 24, 1967, at the age of 44.
