= RSH Studios =

American film rental studio

- Former names: RED Studios Hollywood; Desilu-Cahuenga Studios; Ren-Mar Studios

General information
- Type: Television studios
- Location: 846 N. Cahuenga Boulevard, Hollywood, Los Angeles, California
- Coordinates: 34.0866°N 118.3284°W
- Owner: Red Digital Cinema Camera Company

RSH Studios (formerly known as RED Studios Hollywood, Desilu-Cahuenga Studios and Ren-Mar Studios) is a rental studio located at 846 N. Cahuenga Boulevard in Hollywood, California, on premises that were formerly the home of Desilu Productions.

== History ==
Originally it was the site of Metro Pictures Back Lot #3 in 1920. In 1947 it was rebuilt as a nine-stage studio called Equity Pictures and became Motion Picture Center Studios a year later. It has been used for a wide variety of film and television production, and the studio has been known by many different names.

In 1953, after filming the first two seasons of the I Love Lucy TV series at General Service Studios, Lucille Ball and Desi Arnaz were looking for a larger studio. They looked at the lot (known at the time as Motion Picture Center) and signed a ten-year lease on the property. In 1955 Desilu bought the studio.

In 1959, when Desilu bought other studios in Hollywood and Culver City, the studio's name was changed to Desilu-Cahuenga Studios to avoid confusion with the other Desilu Studios. In 1984, ten years after being independently owned and operated for use by producers, it became Ren-Mar Studios.

In January 2010, Ren-Mar Studios was bought by Red Digital Cinema Camera Company. The complex was renamed Red Studios Hollywood. In 2024, Nikon officially acquired RED Digital Camera, resulting in the studio's name change in early 2025 to RSH Studios. When Nikon acquired RED Digital Cinema in 2024, the studio was excluded from the purchase and was retained by Jarred Land and Jim Jannard, and it remains under their independent ownership to this day.

== Productions ==
The Abbott and Costello Show (season 2, 1953-54), I Love Lucy (seasons 3–6, 1953–1957), The Lucy–Desi Comedy Hour (1957–1960), The Lucy Show (1962-1968), The Dick Van Dyke Show (1961–1966), My World and Welcome to It, Make Room for Daddy, Hogan's Heroes, The Andy Griffith Show, Gomer Pyle-USMC, The Masked Singer (season 4-present), The Jack Benny Program, That Girl, Seinfeld, The Golden Girls, The Golden Palace, Empty Nest, NewsRadio, Ally McBeal, Beauty and the Beast, It’s a Living, MADtv, and Lizzie McGuire are among the television series that have been filmed entirely or partially at Ren-Mar.

Music videos are often filmed at the studio, including those of Madonna, INXS, Michael Jackson, Ozzy Osbourne, Hilary Duff, and Britney Spears.

The front (Cahuenga Boulevard) gate of Ren-Mar was used to represent the "Maroon Cartoon Studio" for the film Who Framed Roger Rabbit (1988). In 1991, the Richard Simmons exercise tape "Sweatin' to the Oldies 3" was taped at Ren-Mar.

Shows produced at Ren-Mar were FNMTV, Monk, and Weeds.
