= Lamar Jackson =

American football player (born 1997)

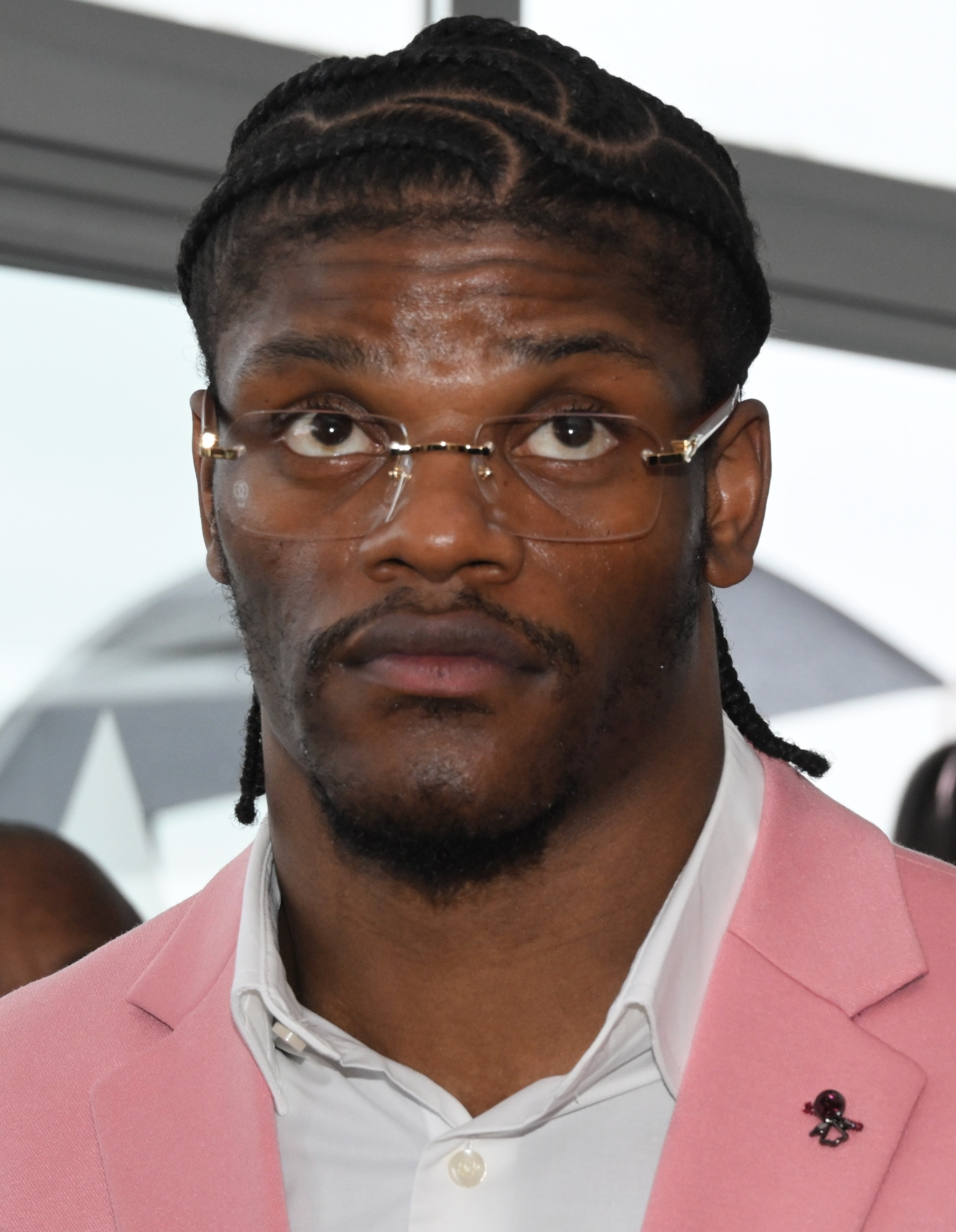
- Jackson in 2024

No. 8 – Baltimore Ravens
- Position: Quarterback
- Roster status: Injured reserve

Personal information
- Born: January 7, 1997 (age 29); Pompano Beach, Florida, U.S.
- Listed height: 6 ft 2 in (1.88 m)
- Listed weight: 205 lb (93 kg)

Career information
- High school: Boynton Beach Community (Boynton Beach, Florida)
- College: Louisville (2015–2017)
- NFL draft: 2018: 1st round, 32nd overall pick

Career history
- Baltimore Ravens (2018–present)

Awards and highlights
- 2× NFL Most Valuable Player (2019, 2023); 3× First-team All-Pro (2019, 2023, 2024); 4× Pro Bowl (2019, 2021, 2023, 2024); NFL passing touchdowns leader (2019); NFL passer rating leader (2024); Heisman Trophy (2016); Louisville Cardinals Ring of Honor; Louisville Cardinals No. 8 retired; NFL records: Career rushing yards by a quarterback: 6,646; Single-season rushing yards by a quarterback: 1,206 (2019)

Career NFL statistics as of 2026
- Passing attempts: 2,985
- Passing completions: 1,938
- Completion percentage: 64.9%
- TD–INT: 193–57
- Passing yards: 23,575
- Passer rating: 102.7
- Rushing yards: 6,666
- Rushing touchdowns: 36
- Stats at Pro Football Reference

Lamar Demeatrice Jackson Jr. (born January 7, 1997) is an American professional football quarterback for the Baltimore Ravens of the National Football League (NFL). He played college football for the Louisville Cardinals, winning the Heisman Trophy in 2016, and was selected by the Ravens with the final pick in the first round of the 2018 NFL draft. A two-time recipient of the NFL Most Valuable Player (MVP) award and the all-time leader in quarterback rushing yards, Jackson is regarded as one of the best quarterbacks of his generation, and by some analysts as one of the greatest dual-threat quarterbacks of all time.

Jackson became the Ravens' starting quarterback during his rookie season after an injury to Joe Flacco, leading the team to a division title and becoming the youngest quarterback to start a playoff game at 21. In his first full season, he led the NFL in touchdown passes and set the single-season rushing record for a quarterback, earning unanimous NFL MVP honors and becoming the fourth Black quarterback to win the award. In 2020, he became the first quarterback with multiple 1,000-yard rushing seasons and led the Ravens to a third straight playoff appearance. He secured a second MVP award in 2023 while taking the Ravens to their first AFC Championship Game since 2012. Jackson currently ranks second on the NFL's all-time regular-season career passer rating list. In 2024, Jackson set career highs in passing, became the all-time leader in quarterback rushing yards, and tied the record for most perfect passer rating games with four.

== Early life ==
Lamar Demeatrice Jackson Jr. was born to Felicia Jones and Lamar "L.J." Jackson Sr. on January 7, 1997. He grew up in the center of an economically distressed section of Pompano Beach, Florida in a public housing project known as Golden Acres. Jackson's father died from a heart attack on the same day his grandmother died in 2005, when he was eight years old. Jackson, his younger brother, and two younger sisters were raised by their mother.

According to Jackson, it was his mom that encouraged him to play football and was his first coach. Jackson says that at the age of 7 she put him and his brother through some very demanding workouts. Jackson attended public schools and played Pop Warner football in the same Florida league with future teammate Marquise Brown. When he was eight years old, Jackson could throw a football 20 yards. At age 11 Jackson won the South Florida FYFL Super Bowl. Jackson, his brother Jamar and the Northwest Broward Raiders beat the Fort Lauderdale Hurricanes, who had been back-to-back champions with a long winning streak. Jackson was the starting quarterback for the Raiders; but he was also the team's safety and place kicker. The Raiders won 14–6 as Jackson threw two touchdowns and kicked the extra points.

== High school ==
External videos
- Lamar Jackson high school football highlights YouTube video

Jackson started his high school football career relatively late, not being on a team until his junior year of high school. Jackson attended Santaluces for his first two years of high school, before transferring to Boynton Beach High School in Boynton Beach, Florida. While there, Jackson was a successful read-option quarterback who could run and throw the ball equally well. He improved passing accuracy and decision-making by watching hours of film each week. In two years at Boynton Beach, Jackson threw for 2,263 yards and 31 touchdowns with nine interceptions. He also ran for 1,624 yards and 22 touchdowns, and had a quarterback rating of 102.7. A touchdown highlight Jackson scored against Village Academy went viral online, with The Palm Beach Post's Ryan DiPentima detailing:

Without any passing options down field, the dynamic QB rolled to his right, pump faked at the line of scrimmage and then took off for the end zone. He pointed at a Village Academy defender while beating him to the edge and then cut up field. Then, as another defender came flying in to make a tackle at the goal line, he hit the breaks [sic]. He just ... stopped. As the defender flew by him, Jackson strutted into the end zone and threw his hands up.

While playing for Boyton Beach, Jackson also faced his Ravens teammate Tyler Huntley on Halloween night in 2014. Huntley and Hallandale high beat Boyton 38–36 with Huntley leading his team downfield for the winning score with 30 seconds left in the game. Jackson's last high school game came against a nationally ranked Miami Central High School team during the first round of the 2014 Florida High School Football Playoff 6A tournament. Boynton Beach was soundly defeated 49–6, with Jackson throwing two interceptions. He also competed for his high school track team, posting a personal record of 11.45 seconds in the 100 meter dash in one track meet. Jackson was named the Lou Groza Palm Beach County High School Player of the Year in 2014.

Jackson was rated three stars by ESPN.com and 247Sports, but four stars by Rivals.com. Despite the disagreement by recruiting companies over his caliber, he received offers from both Power Five schools like Louisville, Florida, Auburn, and Clemson, and mid-major programs like Akron, Western Kentucky, and Marshall. All of the major recruiting companies listed Jackson as a top 20 dual-threat quarterback, with 247Sports ranking him as high as #12. Jackson's in-state ranking also varied greatly, from as high as #51 from Rivals to as low as #80 by ESPN. Jackson visited only four schools (Louisville, Florida, Nebraska, and Mississippi State), and, after it appeared he might sign with Florida, Jackson ultimately committed to the University of Louisville. Head coach Bobby Petrino promised Jackson's mother that her son would be playing quarterback and nothing else.

College recruiting
Name	Hometown	School	Height	Weight	Commit date
Lamar Jackson; QB	Boynton Beach, FL	Boynton Beach Community (FL)	6 ft 3 in (1.91 m)	185 lb (84 kg)	Aug 30, 2014
Lamar Jackson; QB	Recruit ratings: Rivals: 247Sports: ESPN: (79)				
Overall recruit ranking: Scout: N/A Rivals: N/A 247Sports: 409 ESPN: N/A
Note: In many cases, Scout, Rivals, 247Sports, On3, and ESPN may conflict in their listings of height and weight.; In these cases, the average was taken. ESPN grades are on a 100-point scale.; Sources: "Lamar Jackson, 2015". Rivals.; "2014 Team Ranking". Rivals.com.

== College career ==
=== 2015 season ===
Jackson, a communications major, began his true freshman season as the backup quarterback to Reggie Bonnafon. He made his collegiate debut in the season opener against No. 6 Auburn, starting at running back before relieving Bonnafon at quarterback. Jackson completed 9 of 20 passes for 100 yards and an interception while rushing for a team-high 106 yards and a touchdown in the 31–24 loss. He made his first start at quarterback the following week against the Houston Cougars, completing 17 of 27 passes for 168 yards, one touchdown, and two interceptions while also rushing for a touchdown in a 34–31 loss. Jackson was benched the following week in favor of Kyle Bolin, but still appeared in the loss. After Louisville opened the season 0–3 while using three different starting quarterbacks, he regained the starting job against Samford in Week 4, accounting for three total touchdowns and rushing for 184 yards and two scores in the Cardinals' first victory of the season. Jackson started the next five games before missing a contest against Syracuse with an injury. He then returned in a reserve role behind Bolin, appearing in Louisville's final three regular-season games, including the season finale against Kentucky, in which he accounted for three touchdowns and rushed for a season-high 186 yards. Jackson regained the starting job for the 2015 Music City Bowl and was named MVP after passing for 227 yards and two touchdowns while rushing for a Music City Bowl-record 226 yards and two touchdowns in a 27–21 victory over Texas A&M. Jackson played in 12 games and made eight starts (seven at quarterback) during Louisville's 8–5 season. He completed 135 of 247 passes for 1,840 yards and 12 touchdowns with eight interceptions while rushing for 960 yards and 11 touchdowns.

=== 2016 season ===
During the first game of his sophomore year, against the Charlotte 49ers, Jackson set a university record for total touchdowns with eight, all of them in the first half. Against Syracuse, Jackson completed 20 of 39 passes for 411 yards, a touchdown, and an interception to go along with 199 rushing yards and four touchdowns, with all five touchdowns coming in the first half as the Cardinals routed the Orange 62–28. One of those touchdowns came when he hurdled over a Syracuse defender into the end zone.

Against #2 Florida State, Jackson completed 13-of-20 passes for 216 yards, a touchdown, and an interception in addition to 146 rushing yards and four touchdowns. He scored four of the five total touchdowns in the first half in a 63–20 rout of the Seminoles, the most points that the Seminoles had ever surrendered at the time. The game made Jackson the Heisman front runner, and gave the Cardinals a #3 ranking, their highest since 2006. Against Marshall, Jackson completed 24 of 44 passes for 417 yards and five touchdowns, and had 62 rushing yards and two rushing touchdowns. Against #5 Clemson, Louisville's offense totaled 586 yards, with Jackson accounting for 295 passing yards, 162 rushing yards, and three total touchdowns (one passing, two rushing). The Cardinals eventually lost the game 42–36. On December 8, Jackson was awarded the Walter Camp Award as the player of the year and the Maxwell Award as the best all-around player in college football.

External videos
- Jackson's Heisman acceptance speech, ESPN video

On December 10, 2016, Jackson was selected as the 2016 Heisman Trophy winner over fellow finalists Deshaun Watson, Dede Westbrook, Jabrill Peppers, and Baker Mayfield. Jackson became Louisville's first Heisman Trophy winner in school history, and the youngest-ever recipient of the award at the age of 19 years and 337 days. He finished Louisville's 9–4 season with 3,543 passing yards, 30 passing touchdowns, and nine interceptions to go along with 260 carries for 1,571 rushing yards and 21 touchdowns.

Aside from nationally recognized awards, Jackson also won prestigious awards within the University of Louisville. In 2017, he won a Louie for being named the Adidas High Performance Male Athlete of the Year for his outstanding sophomore campaign. Jackson also won a Louie for Play of the Year after the leap he made in the 2016 Syracuse game.

=== 2017 season ===
When Jackson entered the 2017 season, his fan base and media had high expectations of his performance. College GameDay announced their return to the University of Louisville to host the opening matchup on September 16 between the returning National Champions, Clemson Tigers, and the Cardinals. Despite the 47–21 blowout the Tigers achieved, Jackson did not let the numbers affect his playing ability. His remarkable statistics for the season resulted in Jackson being a Heisman finalist for the 2017 season. He finished in third place in the Heisman voting, losing out to Baker Mayfield and Bryce Love. He was the first defending champion to finish in the top 3 in Heisman voting the next year since Tim Tebow. Jackson played in 13 games, finishing with 3,660 passing yards for 27 touchdowns and 10 interceptions to go along with 232 carries for 1,601 rushing yards and 18 touchdowns in the Cardinals' 8–5 season.

Following the 2017–18 school year, Jackson was named the men's ACC Athlete of the Year for all conference sports, sharing honors with women's winner Arike Ogunbowale of Notre Dame basketball.

== Professional career ==
=== Pre-draft ===
On January 5, 2018, Jackson announced that he would enter the 2018 NFL draft. Many draft pundits doubted Jackson's quarterback abilities and suggested that he switch positions to wide receiver due to his athleticism, but Jackson remained adamant about his intention to play quarterback professionally. Jackson declined to run drills such as the 40-yard dash during the NFL Scouting Combine, in order to focus on displaying his passing skills. Jackson reportedly clocked in a 4.34 40 yard dash time in 2017 at Louisville.

External videos
- Lamar Jackson 2018 NFL Combine press conference
- Ravens draft Lamar Jackson, Baltimore Ravens video

Pre-draft measurables
Height	Weight	Arm length	Hand span	Wingspan	Wonderlic
6 ft 2 1/4 in (1.89 m)	216 lb (98 kg)	33 1/8 in (0.84 m)	9 1/2 in (0.24 m)	6 ft 5 5/8 in (1.97 m)	13
All values from NFL Combine

=== 2018 season ===
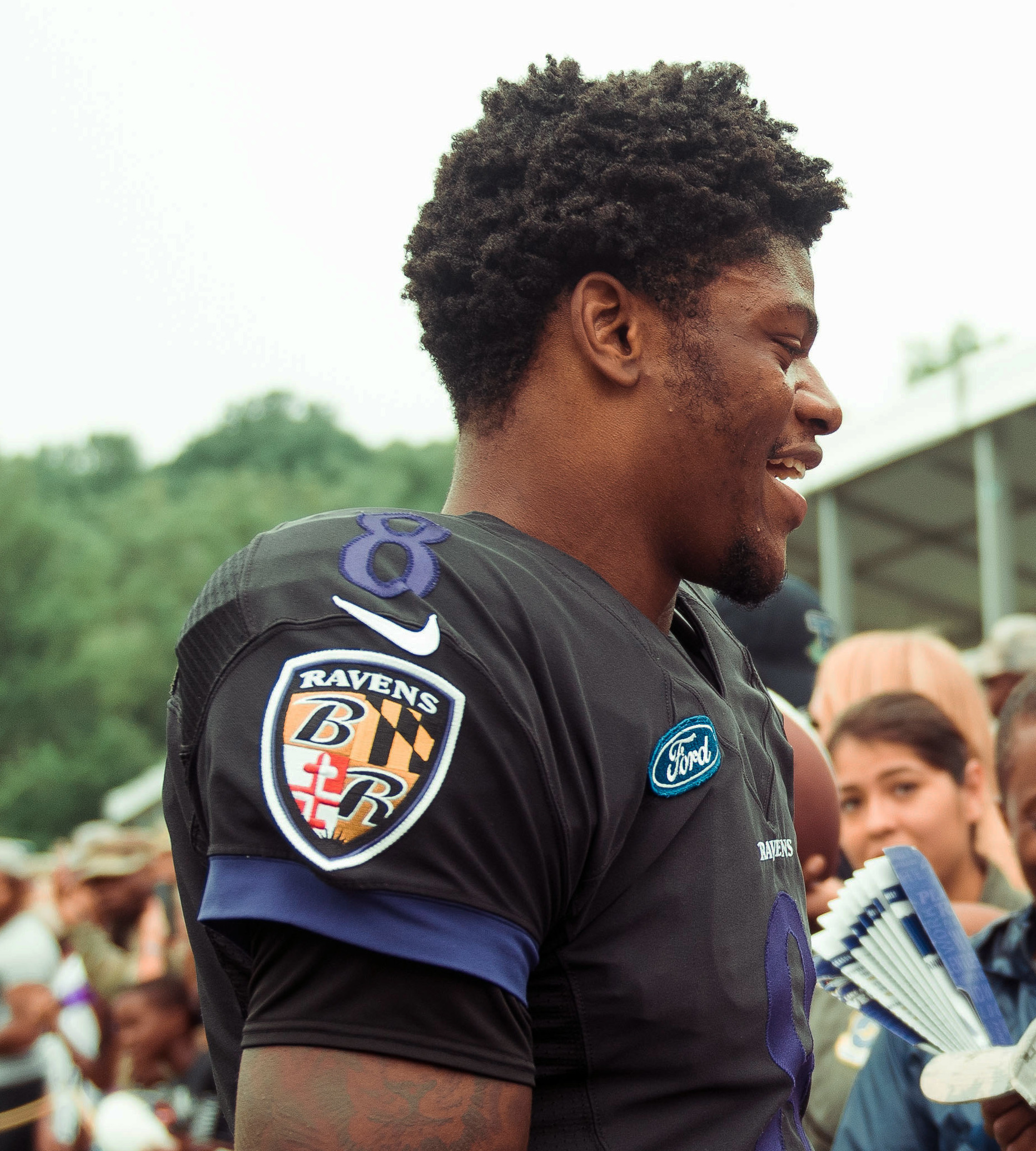
Jackson during training camp in 2018

Jackson was drafted by the Baltimore Ravens in the first round with the 32nd overall pick in the draft, after trading up for the selection with the Philadelphia Eagles. He was the fifth quarterback selected that year. On June 5, 2018, Jackson signed his rookie contract, reportedly worth $9.47 million with a $4.97 million signing bonus.

Jackson made his NFL debut relieving starting quarterback Joe Flacco in the second half of the season-opening 47–3 victory over the Buffalo Bills, finishing with 24 passing yards and 39 rushing yards. During a narrow Week 7 24–23 loss to the New Orleans Saints, Jackson scored his first NFL touchdown on a one-yard rush. In the next game against the Carolina Panthers, Jackson completed four of five passes for 46 yards and his first NFL passing touchdown, a 26-yard completion to fellow rookie tight end Hayden Hurst, in relief of Flacco during the fourth quarter of a 36–21 loss.

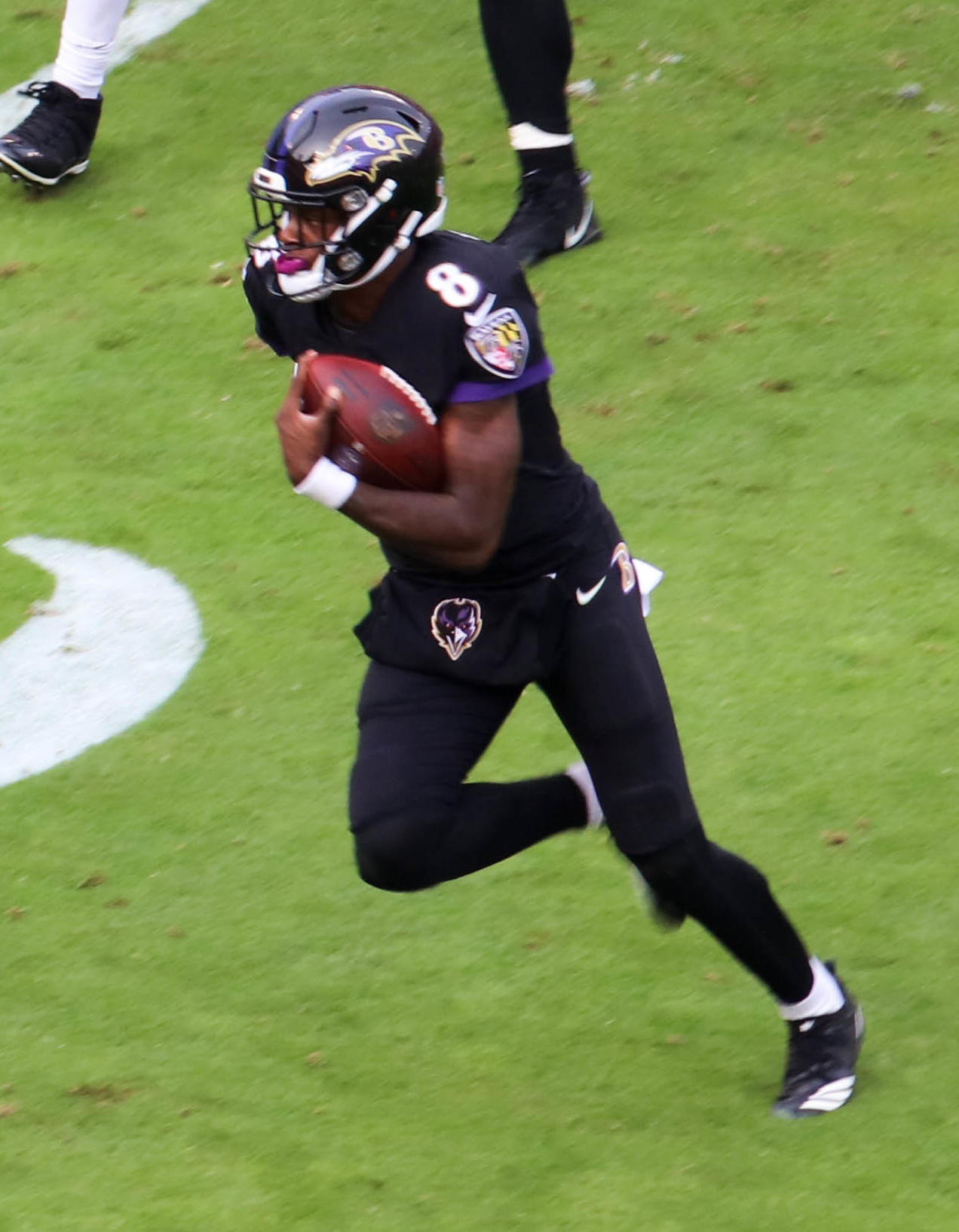
Jackson rushing in 2018

During a Week 11 24–21 victory over the Cincinnati Bengals, Jackson made his first NFL start in place of the injured Joe Flacco, who injured his hip two weeks prior against the Pittsburgh Steelers. Jackson completed 13-of-19 passes for 150 yards and an interception and rushed for 117 yards, which was a Ravens franchise record for rushing yards by a quarterback in a single game. In the next game against the Oakland Raiders, he threw for 178 yards, a touchdown, and two interceptions while also rushing for 71 yards and a touchdown as the Ravens won by a score of 34–17. The following week against the Atlanta Falcons, Jackson passed for 125 yards and rushed for 75 yards and a touchdown in a 26–16 road victory.

During a Week 14 24–27 overtime road loss to the Kansas City Chiefs, Jackson had his first two-touchdown game as he threw for 147 yards and two touchdowns while also rushing for 67 yards. Two weeks later, Jackson helped the Ravens defeat the Los Angeles Chargers, completing 12 of 22 passes for 204 yards and a touchdown in a 22–10 upset victory. In the regular-season finale against fellow rookie quarterback Baker Mayfield and the Cleveland Browns, Jackson passed for 179 yards and rushed for 90 yards and two touchdowns, despite fumbling a third potential touchdown at the goal line, as the Ravens narrowly beat the Browns 26–24 to clinch the AFC North title. In the seven regular season games in which Jackson had started, the Ravens went 6–1 to close out the 2018 season. Overall, he finished the season with 1,201 passing yards, six passing touchdowns, and three interceptions. Jackson also led all quarterbacks with 695 rushing yards and added five rushing touchdowns.

Taking the field on the day before his 22nd birthday, Jackson became the youngest quarterback to start an NFL playoff game in a Wild Card rematch against the Los Angeles Chargers. Despite being held to just 25 passing yards at one point in the fourth quarter by a stout Chargers defense, Jackson then passed for two touchdowns in four minutes to bring the Ravens back from a 20-point deficit to within a touchdown. After forcing the Chargers to punt with less than a minute left, the Ravens had one last chance to win the game down six points, but Jackson was strip-sacked by Chargers linebacker Uchenna Nwosu. With the Chargers recovering the ball, the Ravens lost 23–17 and were knocked out of the playoffs. Jackson finished the game completing 14 of 29 passes for 194 yards, the two aforementioned touchdowns, and an interception while rushing for 54 yards and losing a fumble.

Once the 2018 season ended, the Ravens' coaching staff decided to abandon the offensive strategy that had been designed for Joe Flacco and create a new offensive philosophy centered around the specific skills of Jackson. That philosophy included changing every play in the playbook, the terminology used and drafting players or acquiring free agents that would complement Jackson's skills.

=== 2019: First MVP ===
During the season-opening 59–10 road victory over the Miami Dolphins, Jackson completed 17-of-20 passes for career-highs of 324 yards and five touchdowns, making him the youngest quarterback to achieve a perfect passer rating. Jackson was named the American Football Conference (AFC) Offensive Player of the Week for his performance. In the next game against the Arizona Cardinals, Jackson threw for 272 yards and two touchdowns and rushed for 120 yards as the Ravens won by a score of 23–17. His two touchdown passes set the Ravens' franchise record for the most touchdown passes in the team's first two games of a season. Jackson became the first player in NFL history to pass for more than 250 yards and rush for 120 yards in a single game. The following week against the Kansas City Chiefs, he completed 22-of-43 passes for 267 yards and rushed for 46 yards and his first rushing touchdown of the season as the Ravens lost on the road by a score of 23–17.

During a Week 4 40–25 loss to the Cleveland Browns, Jackson threw for 247 yards, three touchdowns, and two interceptions while also rushing for 66 yards. In the next game against the Pittsburgh Steelers, Jackson completed 19-of-28 passes for 161 yards, a touchdown, and three interceptions as the Ravens won by a score of 26–23 in overtime. The following week against the Cincinnati Bengals, Jackson finished with 236 passing yards, 152 rushing yards, and a rushing touchdown during the 23–17 victory. He also became the first player in NFL history to pass for more than 200 yards and rush for 150 yards in a regular-season game, and had more rushing yards than any player at any position in Week 6. During a Week 7 30–16 road victory over the Seattle Seahawks, Jackson finished with 143 passing yards and 116 rushing yards with a rushing touchdown. After a Week 8 bye, the Ravens faced the unbeaten New England Patriots. In that game, Jackson threw for 163 yards and a touchdown and rushed for 61 yards and two touchdowns during the 37–20 victory. For his performance, Jackson earned his second AFC Offensive Player of the Week award.

In the next game, the Ravens routed the Bengals on the road 49–13 with Jackson throwing for 223 yards and three touchdowns and rushing for 65 yards and a touchdown, finishing with a perfect passer rating. He became only the second player in NFL history to produce two perfect passer ratings in the same season. Jackson joined Aaron Rodgers (2019) and Joe Montana (1989) as the only players in the Super Bowl era with 15-plus completions, 3-plus passing touchdowns, 1-plus rushing touchdowns, and a perfect passer rating in a single game. Jackson also earned his third total, and second consecutive, AFC Offensive Player of the Week award, matching his predecessor Joe Flacco's career total.

During a Week 11 41–7 blowout victory over the Houston Texans, Jackson became the first quarterback in franchise history to throw four or more touchdowns in a game multiple times during the regular season after he threw for 222 yards and four touchdowns. Jackson also rushed for 86 yards in the victory over the Texans, making him the only quarterback in NFL history to rush for more than 60 yards in seven consecutive games. In the next game against the Los Angeles Rams, Jackson threw for 169 yards and five touchdowns while also adding 95 rushing yards during the 45–6 road victory, making him the first player with that many touchdowns in a Monday Night Football debut and the youngest player with multiple five touchdown passing games in NFL history. Jackson earned his fourth AFC Offensive Player of the Week award due to his performance. He was named the AFC's Player of the Month for November. The following week against the San Francisco 49ers, Jackson finished with 105 passing yards, 101 rushing yards, and two total touchdowns as the Ravens won 20–17, and Jackson became the first quarterback in NFL history with four 100-yard rushing games in a season.

During a Week 14 24–17 road victory against the Buffalo Bills, he had 145 passing yards, three touchdowns, and an interception to go along with 40 rushing yards. Jackson also became the first quarterback since Michael Vick to rush for 1,000 yards in a single season. In the next game against the New York Jets, Jackson had 212 passing yards for five touchdowns to go along with eight carries for 86 yards during the 42–21 victory, breaking Vick's single-season rushing record for a quarterback. Jackson's five passing touchdowns in the game made him the sixth player since the merger to have three games with at least five passing touchdowns in a season, and tied the Ravens franchise season record with 33. Jackson was named AFC Player of the Week for his performance against the Jets. The following week against the Browns, Jackson was held to 38 passing yards and a lost fumble in the first 28 minutes, before exploding for 142 yards and two touchdowns in the last two minutes before halftime. He added a third touchdown pass in the second half of the 31–15 road victory, setting the Ravens single season record for touchdown passes at 36, finishing with 238 passing yards and 103 rushing yards. On the day after the Ravens' victory over the Browns, and due to the Ravens' having clinched home-field advantage, head coach John Harbaugh announced that Jackson, guard Marshal Yanda, safety Earl Thomas, and defensive tackle Brandon Williams would be inactive for the Week 17 game against the Steelers. Even without playing in the Ravens' final game, Jackson led all quarterbacks with 36 touchdown passes and a QBR of 81.10; he also led all rushers with a 6.9 yards per carry average. During the 2019 season, Jackson was also first with 43 total touchdowns and a 9.0 passing touchdown percentage.

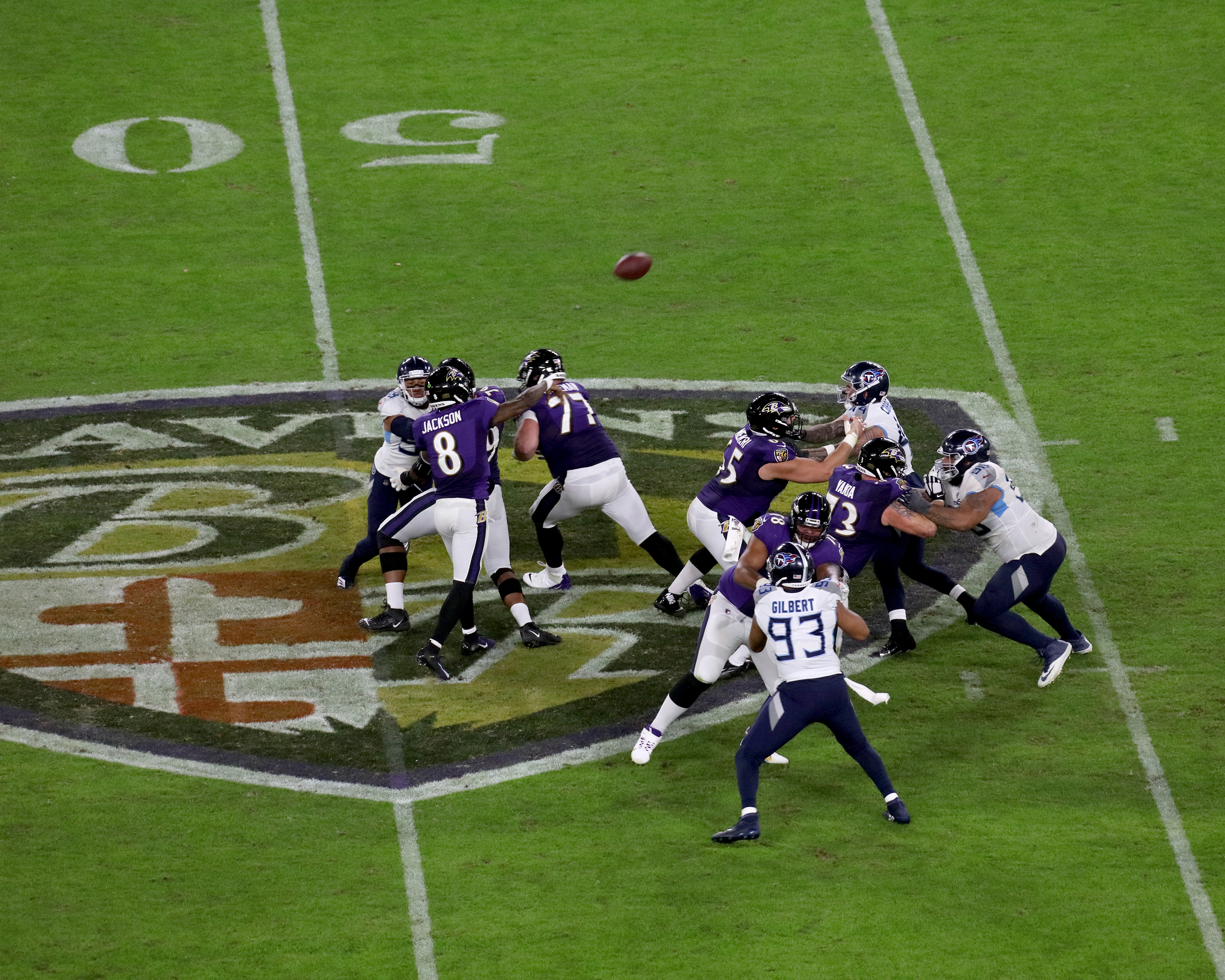
Jackson throwing a pass against the Tennessee Titans in the 2019 Divisional Playoffs.

Jackson was the starting quarterback at the 2020 Pro Bowl in Orlando, Florida. He threw for 185 yards and two touchdowns with one interception and was named the offensive Most Valuable Player. Jackson became the youngest quarterback in NFL history to start a Pro Bowl game.

Jackson was voted the MVP of the 2019 season. He became the second player after Tom Brady in 2010 to be voted unanimously and the second-youngest player to win, behind only Jim Brown. Jackson, along with Patrick Mahomes, Cam Newton and Steve McNair, is one of the four African-American quarterbacks to win the AP MVP award.

In the Divisional Round against the Tennessee Titans, Jackson and the Ravens were unable to replicate the same success that they had in the regular season, losing 28–12. Jackson finished the game completing 31-of-59 passes for 365 yards, a touchdown, and two interceptions while also losing a fumble on a strip sack. He also had 20 carries for 143 yards becoming the first player to throw for 300+ yards and rush for 100+ yards in a playoff game. In total, Jackson personally accounted for over 500 yards of offense.

=== 2020 season ===
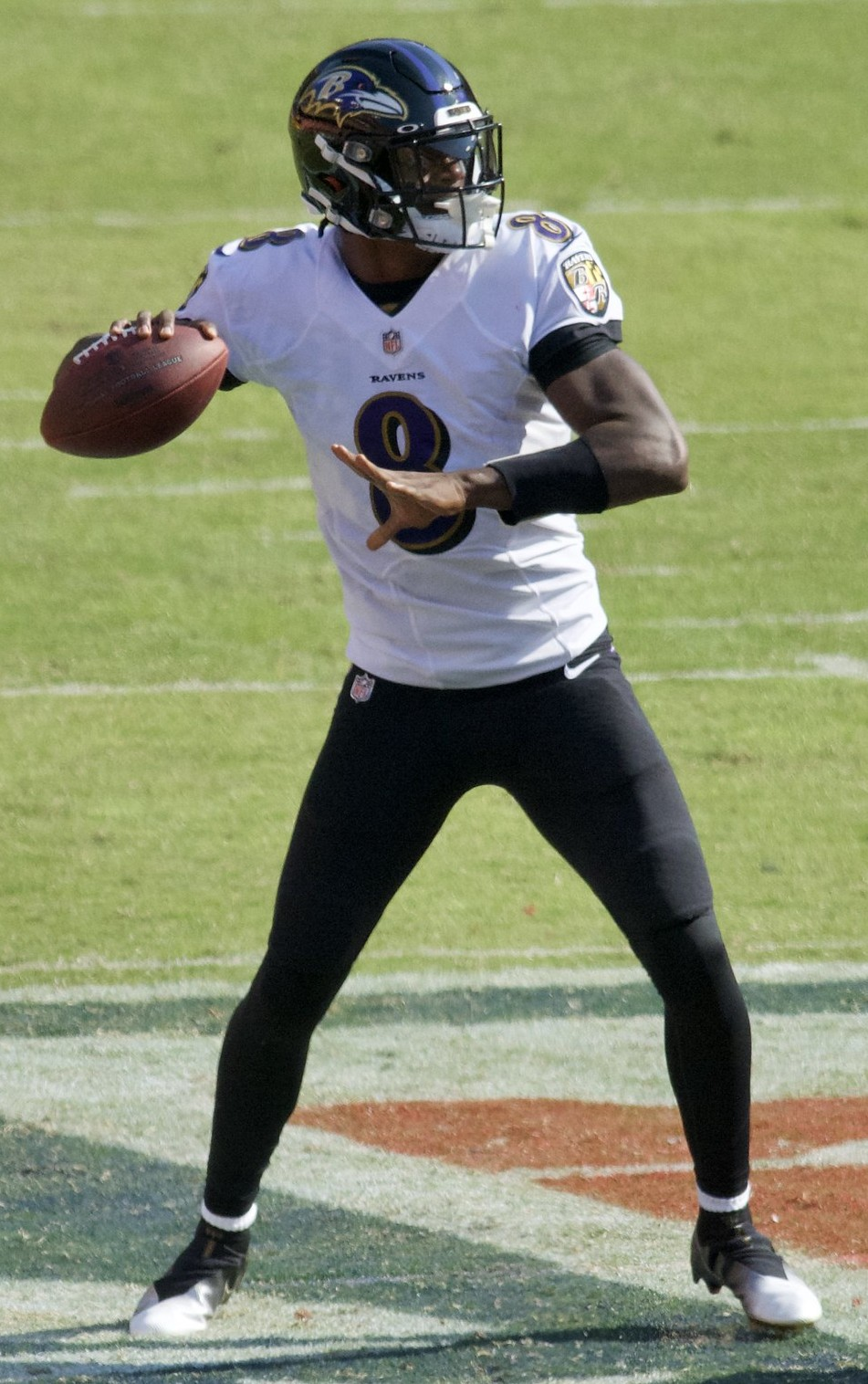
Jackson during a game against the Washington Football Team in 2020

During the season-opening 38–6 victory over the Cleveland Browns, Jackson completed 20-of-25 passes for 275 yards and three touchdowns. He was named the AFC Offensive Player of the Week for his performance. Two weeks later against the Kansas City Chiefs, Jackson threw for a career-low 97 yards and a touchdown during the 34–20 road loss. In the next game against the Washington Football Team, he threw for 193 yards and two touchdowns, and rushed for 52 yards and a touchdown as the Ravens won on the road by a score of 31–17, making Jackson the fastest player in NFL history to reach 5,000 yards passing and 2,000 yards rushing. During a Week 8 24–28 loss to the Pittsburgh Steelers, he threw for 208 yards and two touchdowns, but also threw two interceptions, including his first career pick-six, and lost two fumbles. On November 26, 2020, Jackson tested positive for COVID-19 and was placed on the reserve/COVID-19 list. He was activated on December 7.

Jackson made his return in Week 13 against the Dallas Cowboys. During the game, Jackson threw for 107 yards, two touchdowns, and an interception and rushed for 94 yards and a touchdown in the 34–17 victory. In the next game, Jackson set an NFL record for the most rushing yards by a quarterback on Monday Night Football as he rushed for 124 yards in a thriller against the Browns. However, Jackson then left the game late in the third quarter due to leg cramps. He was out of the game for most of the fourth quarter, and Cleveland was able to come back from 14-down and take a 35–34 lead. After backup Trace McSorley suffered a left knee sprain with two minutes left in regulation, Jackson re-entered the game and, on 4th down and 5, threw a 44-yard touchdown pass to Marquise Brown. After the Browns drove down and tied the game at 42, Jackson followed up with a short drive to get the Ravens into field goal range, allowing them to get the road victory by the score of 47–42. Jackson had two rushing touchdowns and a passing touchdown in the game and was named the AFC Offensive Player of the Week for his performance. The following week against the Jacksonville Jaguars, Jackson threw for 243 yards, three touchdowns, and an interception and rushed for 35 yards and a touchdown during the 40–14 victory. In the regular-season finale against the Cincinnati Bengals, Jackson threw for 113 yards, three touchdowns, and an interception and rushed for 97 yards during the 38–3 road victory. During the game, Jackson became the first NFL quarterback to have multiple seasons surpassing 1,000 rushing yards.

In the Wild Card Round, Jackson won his first career playoff game by defeating the Tennessee Titans in a rematch of the previous year's Divisional Round matchup. He threw for 179 yards and an interception and rushed for 136 yards and a touchdown during the 20–13 road victory. During the Divisional Round against the Buffalo Bills, Jackson threw for 162 yards and rushed for 34 yards, but threw a costly red zone pick-six to Taron Johnson late in third quarter. Jackson then sustained a concussion on the last play of the third quarter, effectively ending his season as the Ravens lost on the road by a score of 17–3.

=== 2021 season ===
On April 30, 2021, the Ravens exercised the fifth-year option on Jackson's contract, worth a guaranteed $23 million for the 2022 season. Jackson was diagnosed with COVID-19 around the start of training camp, the second time he had contracted the virus.

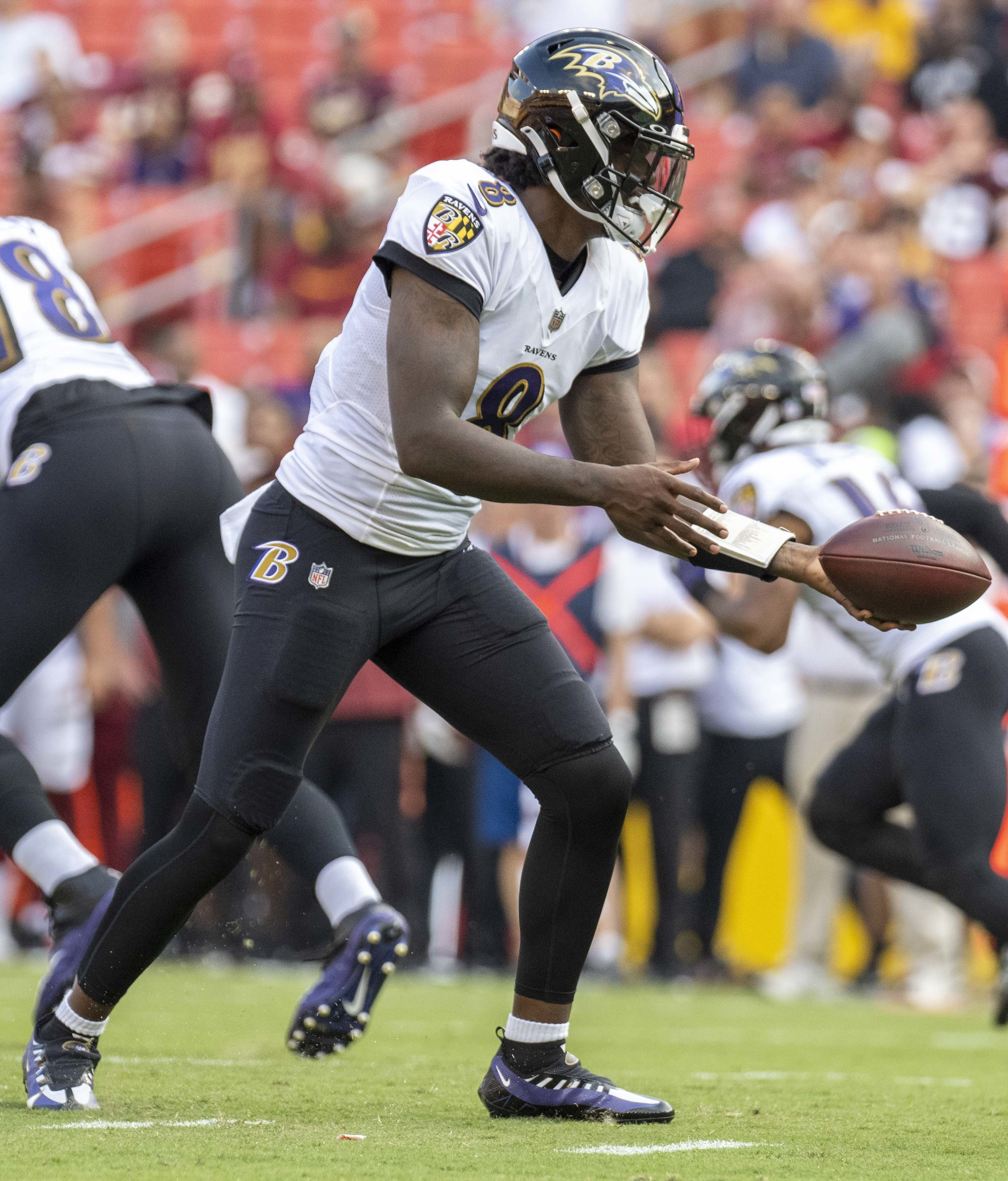
Jackson in 2021

During the season-opening 33–27 overtime road loss to the Las Vegas Raiders, Jackson finished with 235 passing yards and a touchdown to go along with 86 rushing yards, but also lost two of three fumbles. In the next game against the Kansas City Chiefs, Jackson threw for 239 yards, a touchdown, and two interceptions while also rushing for 107 yards and two touchdowns during the narrow 36–35 victory, marking Jackson's first win over Patrick Mahomes. The following week against the Detroit Lions, Jackson had 287 passing yards and a touchdown to go along with 58 yards during a narrow 19–17 road victory, as Ravens kicker Justin Tucker made an NFL record 66-yard field goal in the final seconds to win the game.

During a Week 5 31–25 overtime victory the Indianapolis Colts, Jackson threw for a career-high and Ravens franchise record 442 yards and four touchdowns while also rushing for 62 yards, helping the Ravens erase a 19-point deficit. He also became the first quarterback to have a 85%+ completion rate while throwing 40+ passes. Ravens coach John Harbaugh called it one of the greatest performances he had ever seen. In the next game against the Los Angeles Chargers, Jackson set the record for the most victories as a starting quarterback under the age of 25 at 35 in 34–6 blowout victory. During a Week 12 16–10 victory over the Cleveland Browns, Jackson threw for 165 yards, a touchdown, a career high four interceptions. Two weeks later against the Browns, Jackson left the eventual narrow 24–22 loss in the first quarter after suffered an ankle injury when he was hit by Jeremiah Owusu-Koramoah. Due to his injury, Jackson missed the rest of the season. He was named to his second Pro Bowl after his first coming in his unanimous MVP season.

=== 2022 season ===
Jackson turned down a contract extension due to his belief that he could improve and earn more. During a Week 2 42–38 loss to the Miami Dolphins, Jackson threw for 318 yards and three touchdowns while also rushing for 119 yards and a touchdown. In the game, Jackson surpassed Michael Vick for the most 100-yard rushing games by a quarterback. For the first month of the 2022 NFL season, Jackson led the league in quarterback rating (119.0) and passing touchdowns (10). Jackson also ran for two touchdowns. His 12 combined touchdowns were more than the number of touchdowns scored by 30 NFL teams to that point in the season. As a result, Jackson was named the AFC Offensive Player of the Month. In Week 6 against the New York Giants, Jackson suffered his first loss to an NFC opponent, having been 12–0 previously.

During a narrow Week 13 10–9 victory over the Denver Broncos, Jackson suffered a sprained PCL when he was sacked by Jonathon Cooper. Despite an initial timetable of one to three weeks for his PCL injury, Jackson missed the final five games of the regular season as the Ravens finished 10–7, earning the sixth seed in the playoffs. On January 13, Jackson was ruled out for the Ravens' Wild Card Round game against the Cincinnati Bengals.

=== 2023: Second MVP ===
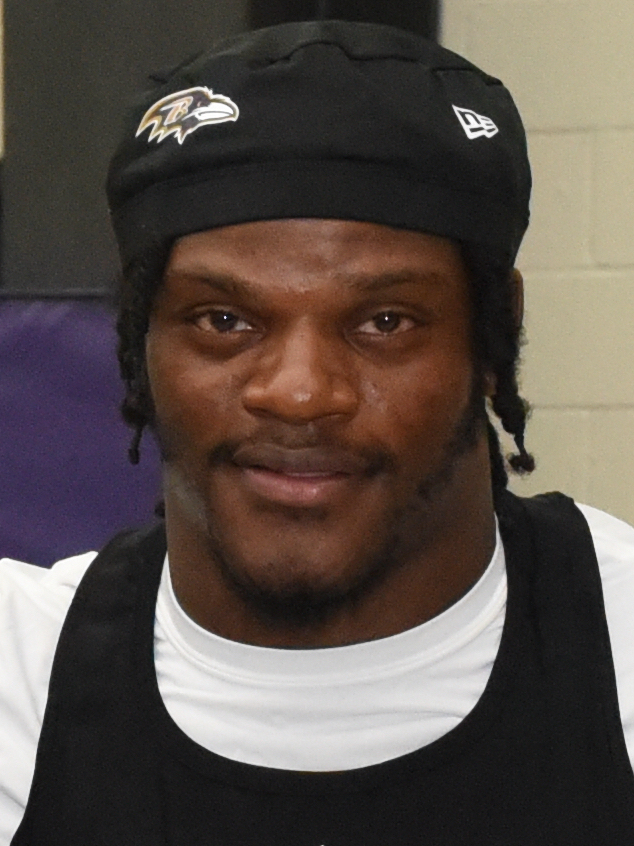
Jackson during training camp in 2023

On March 7, 2023, the Ravens placed the non-exclusive franchise tag on Jackson. On March 27, Jackson stated publicly via his personal Twitter account that he had requested a trade on March 2, saying the Ravens' front office "has not been interested in meeting my value" during negotiations for a long-term contract. The stalemate ended on April 27, when Jackson signed a five-year contract worth $260 million with $185 million guaranteed. He would receive $52 million per year, making him the highest-paid player in NFL history just 10 days after Eagles quarterback Jalen Hurts set the record (although Jackson's record contract would be surpassed by Justin Herbert just months later). The deal also included a $72.5 million signing bonus, surpassing Cowboys quarterback Dak Prescott's 2021 deal for the biggest signing bonus in NFL history.

On September 17, 2023, Jackson and the Ravens faced off against the previous season's AFC North champion Cincinnati Bengals. Jackson completed 24-of-33 passes for 237 yards and two touchdowns while also rushing for 54 yards as the Ravens won 27–24. During a Week 7 38–6 victory over the Detroit Lions, Jackson threw for a season high 357 yards and three touchdowns, compiling a near perfect 155.8 passer rating. He also ran for 36 yards and a touchdown which earned him the AFC Offensive Player of the Week honors. During a Week 12 20–10 road victory over the Los Angeles Chargers, Jackson ran for 39 yards to reach 5,000 career rushing yards, joining Michael Vick, Cam Newton, and Russell Wilson as the only quarterbacks in NFL history to achieve 5,000 career rushing yards. He also did so in just 82 career games, the fewest for a quarterback in NFL history, surpassing Michael Vick's previous record of doing so in 104 career games.

During a Week 16 33–19 road victory over the top-seeded San Francisco 49ers on Christmas Day, Jackson threw for 252 yards, two touchdowns, and no interceptions for a 105.9 passer rating while also leading Baltimore with 45 rushing yards. In the next game against the Miami Dolphins, Jackson was named AFC Offensive Player of the Week after posting a perfect passer rating for the third time in his career, completing 18 of 21 passes for 321 yards, five touchdowns, and no interceptions during a 56–19 victory. The win also clinched the top-seed in the AFC and the AFC North championship for the first time since 2019.

On January 3, 2024, the Ravens announced that Jackson would be inactive for the final game of the regular season. He finished the regular season with career highs in pass completions, completion percentage, and passing yards. Jackson won his second NFL MVP in a near-unanimous decision, receiving 49 of 50 first-place votes. At the age of 27, Jackson became the second-youngest player to win multiple MVPs, behind Jim Brown.

During the Divisional Round against the Houston Texans, Jackson accounted for all four of the Ravens' touchdowns and led Baltimore to a 34–10 victory, clinching their first AFC Championship Game appearance since 2012. Jackson scored rushing touchdowns, running for a total of 100 yards on 11 carries, and completed 16-of-22 passes for 152 yards with a passer rating of 121.8. At home against the Kansas City Chiefs in the AFC Championship Game, Jackson completed 20-of-37 passes for 272 yards with one touchdown and rushed eight times for 54 yards. One of the completed passes was batted into the air and caught by Jackson himself who went for 14 yards. The play was named best play at the 2024 ESPY Awards. However, he lost a fumble and threw an interception in the endzone in the fourth quarter as the Ravens lost 17–10.

=== 2024 season ===
In the NFL Kickoff Game against the Chiefs, Jackson ran for 122 yards and passed Russell Wilson for the third-most career rushing yards for a quarterback. After an 0–2 start to the season, Jackson led the team to victories over the Dallas Cowboys and Buffalo Bills, with a passer rating of 135+ in both games. Against the Bengals on October 6, Jackson threw for 348 yards and four touchdowns in a 41–38 overtime victory, rallying Baltimore from a 10-point fourth-quarter deficit. The following week against the Washington Commanders, Jackson passed Cam Newton for the second-most career rushing yards for a quarterback. In Week 7 against the Buccaneers, he completed 17-of-22 passes for 281 yards, five touchdowns, and a near-perfect passer rating of 158.1, helping the Ravens overcome an early double-digit deficit and extend their winning streak to five games with a 41–31 victory. Jackson's victory improved his record to 23–1 against NFC teams, the best by any quarterback against an opposing conference in NFL history. After a 289-yard, two-touchdown performance in a loss to the Browns, Jackson was named AFC Offensive Player of the Month for October.

In Week 9 against the Broncos, Jackson recorded a perfect passer rating for the fourth time in his career, completing 16-of-19 passes for 280 yards and three touchdowns in a 41–10 victory. He became the first player in league history to have four perfect games with at least 15 passing attempts. Against the Bengals in Week 10, Jackson had the best fourth quarter performance of his career, throwing for 197 yards, three touchdowns, and a perfect passer rating in the final quarter as he rallied the Ravens from a 14-point deficit to win 35–34. He also became the only player in NFL history with five touchdown passes and no interceptions in the fourth quarter against an opponent in a single season. In Week 12 against the Los Angeles Chargers, Jackson threw for 177 yards, two touchdowns, and added a rushing score in the 30–23 win. In Week 15, Jackson threw five touchdowns with just four incompletions in a 35–14 win over the Giants, becoming the first quarterback to throw for over 250 yards, five passing touchdowns, at least an 80% completion rate, zero interceptions, and rush for over 50 yards in one game. The next week on December 21, Jackson threw for three touchdowns in a pivotal divisional game against the Steelers, securing a 34–17 victory.

On Christmas Day against the Houston Texans, Jackson tallied three touchdowns and surpassed Michael Vick as the NFL's all-time leading rusher at quarterback in a 31–2 victory. Jackson capped off a record-setting regular season by leading the Ravens to their second consecutive AFC North title with a 35–10 victory over the Browns. With the win, Jackson became the first player in NFL history to record over 4,000 passing yards and 900 rushing yards in a single season. Additionally, he threw 41 touchdown passes with only four interceptions, setting a new record for the fewest interceptions with over 40 touchdown passes. Jackson also achieved the fourth-highest single-season passer rating and became the first player to lead the league in both yards per pass attempt and yards per rush attempt in the same season. He was named a First-team All-Pro and the PFWA MVP, but Jackson ultimately finished second in AP NFL MVP voting, narrowly losing to Josh Allen, who received 27 first-place votes compared to Jackson's 23 votes.

Jackson started all 17 games in 2024, completing 316 of 474 passes, a 66.7%. He also had career highs in passing yards (4,172), passing touchdowns (41), and passer rating (119.6). His passing touchdowns and passer rating for the 2024 season were both franchise records. In 2024 he also became the first player in NFL history to rush for more than 800 yards and pass for more than 4,000 yards in a season.

In the Wild Card Round against the Steelers, Jackson threw for 175 yards and two touchdowns in the 28–14 win as the Ravens advanced to the divisional round. In the Divisional Round against the Bills, Jackson threw for 254 yards and two touchdowns but also threw an interception and lost a fumble as the Ravens lost 27–25.

=== 2025 season ===
During Week 4 against the Kansas City Chiefs, Jackson threw for 147 yards with one touchdown and an interception before leaving the game with a hamstring injury in the 20–37 loss. He missed the next three games before returning in Week 9 against the Miami Dolphins, where he threw for 204 yards and four touchdowns in the 28–6 win. That performance garnered him his 14th career AFC Offensive Player of the Week award. Jackson's start in the Week 10 game against the Minnesota Vikings was the 100th start of his career. The 27–19 victory in that game ran Jackson's career starting record to 73 wins and 27 losses.

On November 12, Jackson missed the Wednesday practice before the Ravens Week 11 game against the Browns, with the Ravens blaming a sore knee. The Ravens won the game, but Jackson had one of his worst outings since starting at quarterback for the Ravens. In that game, Jackson missed 4 of his first 8 passes, was sacked 5 times, threw 2 interceptions, and had no touchdowns. He finished the game with a 46.5 passer rating, the worst of his career. In Week 12, Jackson again missed the Wednesday practice before the New York Jets game. For the second straight week, he threw no touchdown passes. He posted a 76.9 passer rating and a quarterback rating of 34.7. Jackson's mid-season slump continued in the Ravens' week 13 loss to the Cincinnati Bengals; a game in which he lost 2 fumbles and was intercepted once. Jackson finished the game without a touchdown pass for the third week in a row and a QBR of 22.2, his lowest of the season.

=== 2026 season ===
Jackson began the 2026 season under new head coach Jesse Minter and offensive coordinator Declan Doyle following the departure of longtime head coach John Harbaugh. Through the first four games, Jackson completed 70.8% of his passes for 967 yards, six touchdowns, and one interception, while adding 144 rushing yards and one rushing touchdown. The Ravens compiled a 3–1 record in his four starts. During the week 4 game against the Tennessee Titans on October 4, Jackson suffered a high left ankle sprain that forced him to leave the game. The injury sidelined him for three consecutive games, during which backup quarterback Tyler Huntley led Baltimore to a 1–2 record. He returned in week 8 against the Buffalo Bills. On Baltimore's opening possession, Jackson injured his right thumb when his throwing hand collided with Bills linebacker Greg Rousseau while attempting a pass. Jackson immediately went to the locker room and was ruled out of the game. Minter later announced that Jackson would get surgery on his thumb and be placed on injured reserve, potentially ending his season.

== Player profile ==
Jackson has been widely regarded as the best running quarterback in the NFL. His dual-threat playstyle has often earned him comparisons to players such as Randall Cunningham and Michael Vick. Except for his rookie season, the Ravens have led the league in rushing each year with Jackson. In 2019, the Ravens broke the single-season rushing record, with Jackson breaking Vick's record for most rushing yards by a quarterback in a single season. In 2024, his seventh season, Jackson broke Vick's record for most rushing yards by a quarterback in a career.

Early in his NFL career, concerns were raised on Jackson's ability to play as a pure pocket passer when the run game is contained. These concerns about Jackson's passing began during his college tenure with Louisville. Most analysts have cited improvement in Jackson's passing ability over his career. Jackson has recorded four perfect passer rating games in his career, tied for the most in NFL history.

== Career statistics ==
Legend
	AP NFL MVP
	Led the league
**Bold**	Career high

=== NFL ===
==== Regular season ====
Year	Team	Games			Passing									Rushing					Sacks		Fumbles	
Year	Team	GP	GS	Record	Cmp	Att	Pct	Yds	Avg	Lng	TD	Int	Rtg	Att	Yds	Avg	Lng	TD	Sck	SckY	Fum	Lost
2018	BAL	16	7	6–1	99	170	58.2	1,201	7.1	74	6	3	84.5	147	695	4.7	39	5	16	71	**12**	4
2019	BAL	15	15	**13–2**	265	401	66.1	3,127	7.8	83T	36	6	113.3	**176**	**1,206**	**6.9**	47	**7**	23	106	9	2
2020	BAL	15	15	11–4	242	376	64.4	2,757	7.3	47	26	9	99.3	159	1,005	6.3	50	**7**	29	160	10	4
2021	BAL	12	12	7–5	246	382	64.4	2,882	7.5	49	16	**13**	87.0	133	767	5.8	31	2	**38**	190	6	3
2022	BAL	12	12	8–4	203	326	62.3	2,242	6.9	75	17	7	91.1	112	764	6.8	**79**	3	26	114	5	2
2023	BAL	16	16	13–3	307	457	67.2	3,678	8.0	80	24	7	102.7	148	821	5.5	30	5	37	218	11	**6**
2024	BAL	17	17	12–5	**316**	**474**	66.7	**4,172**	8.8	**84T**	**41**	4	**119.6**	139	915	6.6	48	4	23	149	10	5
2025	BAL	13	13	6–7	192	302	63.6	2,549	8.4	64T	21	7	103.8	67	349	5.2	20	2	36	**239**	7	3
2026	BAL	5	5	3–2	68	97	**70.1**	967	**10.0**	54	6	1	118.4	19	144	7.6	21	1	7	64	1	1
Career		121	112	79–33	1,938	2,985	64.9	23,575	7.9	84	193	57	102.7	1,100	6,666	6.1	79	36	235	1,311	71	30

==== Postseason ====
Year	Team	Games			Passing									Rushing					Sacks		Fumbles	
Year	Team	GP	GS	Record	Cmp	Att	Pct	Yds	Avg	Lng	TD	Int	Rtg	Att	Yds	Avg	Lng	TD	Sck	SckY	Fum	Lost
2018	BAL	1	1	0–1	14	29	48.3	194	6.7	39	2	1	78.8	9	54	6.0	17	0	7	**55**	**3**	**1**
2019	BAL	1	1	0–1	31	**59**	52.5	365	6.2	38	1	**2**	63.2	20	143	7.2	30	0	4	20	1	**1**
2020	BAL	2	2	1–1	31	48	64.6	341	7.1	31	0	**2**	68.1	**25**	**170**	6.8	**48T**	1	**8**	38	1	0
2022	BAL	0	0	—	Did not play due to injury																	
2023	BAL	2	2	1–1	**36**	**59**	61.0	424	7.2	**54**	3	1	92.8	19	154	**8.1**	23	**2**	7	46	1	**1**
2024	BAL	2	2	1–1	34	46	**73.9**	**429**	**9.3**	42	**4**	1	**122.5**	21	120	5.7	20	0	3	24	1	**1**
Career		8	8	3–5	146	241	60.6	1,753	7.3	54	10	7	84.6	94	641	6.8	48	3	29	183	7	4

=== College ===
Legend
ACC Player of the Year

Season	Team	Games (Note: Jackson started at RB 9/5/15 against Auburn.)			Passing							Rushing			
Season	Team	GP	GS	Record	Cmp	Att	Pct	Yds	TD	Int	Rtg	Att	Yds	Avg	TD
2015	Louisville	12	8	5–2	135	247	54.7	1,840	12	8	126.8	163	960	5.9	11
2016	Louisville	13	13	9–4	230	409	56.2	3,543	**30**	9	**148.8**	**260**	1,571	6.0	**21**
2017	Louisville	13	13	8–5	**254**	**430**	**59.1**	**3,660**	27	**10**	146.6	232	**1,601**	**6.9**	18
Career		38	34	22–11	619	1,086	57.0	9,043	69	27	142.9	655	4,132	6.3	50

=== High school ===
Year	Team	Games		Passing							Rushing			
Year	Team	GP	GS	Comp	Att	Pct	Yards	TD	Int	Rate	Att	Yards	Avg	TD
2013	Boyton Beach	9	9	**70**	**163**	42.9	**1,264**	**19**	**6**	93.7	**102**	**960**	**9.4**	10
2014	Boyton Beach	7	7	53	98	**54.1**	999	12	3	**116.5**	90	664	7.4	**12**
Career		16	16	123	261	47.1	2,263	31	9	102.7	192	1,624	8.5	22

== Career highlights ==
=== Awards and honors ===
External videos
- Jackson's 2019 MVP acceptance speech, Ravens video

NFL

- 2× AP NFL Most Valuable Player (2019, 2023)
- 3× PFWA NFL Most Valuable Player (2019, 2023, 2024)
- 2× Bert Bell Award (2019, 2023)
- 3× 101 Awards AFC Offensive Player of the Year (2019, 2023, 2024)
- The Sporting News Offensive Player of the Year (2019)
- 3× First-team All-Pro (2019, 2023, 2024)
- 4× Pro Bowl (2019, 2021, 2023, 2024)
- Pro Bowl Offensive MVP (2019)
- NFL passing touchdowns leader (2019)
- NFL passer rating leader (2024)
- 2× Total quarterback rating leader: (2019, 2024)
- 14× AFC Offensive Player of the Week (2019: Week 1, Week 9, Week 10, Week 12, Week 15) (2020: Week 1, Week 14) (2021: Week 5) (2023 Week 7, Week 17) (2024 Week 5, Week 7, Week10) (2025 Week 9)
- 5× AFC Offensive Player of the Month (December 2018) (November 2019) (September 2022) (December 2023) (October 2024)
- FedEx Air Player of the Year (2019)
- NFL Top 100 rankings: #1 (2020), #24 (2021), #36 (2022), #72 (2023), #2 (2024), #2 (2025), #69 (2026)

College

- Heisman Trophy (2016)
- Maxwell Award (2016)
- Walter Camp Award (2016)
- Associated Press Player of the Year (2016)
- Sporting News Player of the Year (2016)
- Unanimous All-American (2016)
- ACC Athlete of the Year (2018)
- 2× ACC Player of the Year (2016, 2017)
- 2× ACC Offensive Player of the Year (2016, 2017)
- 2× First-team All-ACC (2016, 2017)
- Unanimous selection to Louisville Cardinals Team of the Decade (2010–2019)
- Louisville Cardinals Ring of Honor
- Number 8 retired by the Louisville Cardinals

=== Records ===
==== NFL records ====
- Most rushing yards by a quarterback in a career: 6,513
- Most rushing yards by a quarterback in a season: 1,206 (2019)
- Most games with a perfect passer rating: 4 (tied with Peyton Manning)
- First quarterback with multiple 1,000-yard rushing seasons: (2019, 2020)
- First quarterback with six 700+ rushing yards seasons in a career: (2019, 2020, 2021, 2022, 2023, 2024)
- Most seasons rushing 800+ yards by a quarterback (4)
- First player with 3,000 passing yards and 1,000 rushing yards in a season: (2019)
- First player with 4,000 passing yards and 800 rushing yards in a season: (2024)
- First player to throw for 300+ yards and rush for 100+ yards in a playoff game.
- First player to register two rushing touchdowns, two passing touchdowns, 100 rushing yards, and 100 passer rating in any game
- Most rushing attempts by a quarterback in a season: 159 (2019)
- Most 100+ rushing yards games by a quarterback in a season: 5 (2019)
- Most career 100+ rushing yards games by a quarterback: 12
- Most 100 rushing yards games by a quarterback in the postseason: 3 (2024)
- Most perfect passer ratings in a season (tied with Ben Roethlisberger): 2 (2019)
- Most wins by a quarterback under the age of 25: 35
- Youngest quarterback to ever start a playoff game: 21 years, 364 days (2018 Wild Card Round against the Los Angeles Chargers)
- Youngest quarterback to achieve a perfect passer rating: 22 years, 244 days (Week 1, 2019)
- Highest completion percentage in a game when attempting more than 40 passes: 86% (Week 5, 2021)

==== Ravens franchise records ====
- Most passing yards by a quarterback in a game: 442 (Week 5, 2021)
- Most passing touchdowns in a season: 41 (2024)
- Most passing touchdowns in a game: 5 (tied with Joe Flacco and Tony Banks)
- Most rushing yards by a quarterback in a game: 152 (Week 6, 2019)
- Most rushing yards by a quarterback in a season: 1206 (2019)
- Career rushing touchdowns by a quarterback: 35
- Career rushing yards by a quarterback: 6513
- Highest completion percentage in a game: 88.2
- Highest completion percentage in a season: 67.2 (2023)
- Highest completion percentage, career: 65.1
- Highest passer rating, season: 119.6 (2024)

==== Louisville Cardinals records ====
- Most career rushing attempts by a quarterback: 655 (2015–2017)
- Most career rushing yards: 4,132 (2015–2017)
- Most career rushing touchdowns: 50 (2015–2017)
- Most passing touchdowns in a game: 6 (tied with Chris Redman) (2016)

== Personal life ==
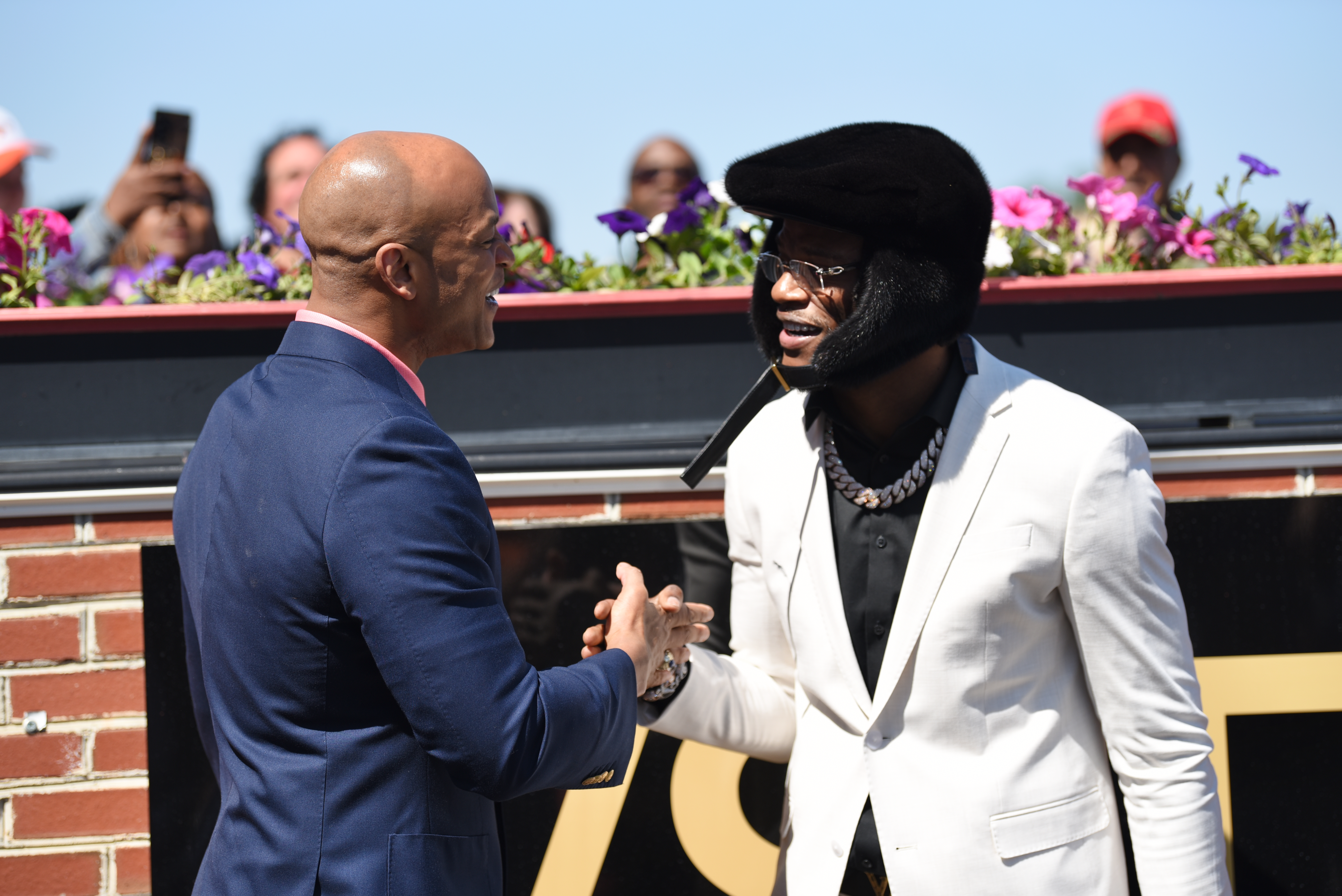
Jackson at a NTLDreamers Foundation Baltimore event in 2025

Jackson is a Christian. He has a daughter named Milan, whom he calls by her nickname: "Lani". As of 2019, Jackson lives in Owings Mills, Maryland, about 20 minutes from the Ravens training complex with his mother and siblings. Trayvon Mullen, and Tiawan Mullen are Jackson's first cousins through his mother's side of the family. Adoree' Jackson is his first cousin once removed. Another cousin is James Pierre, who is a cornerback for the Minnesota Vikings. Jackson is a childhood friend of fellow Pompano Beach native and rapper Kodak Black; the two went to elementary school together and were close friends growing up. In 2021 President Donald Trump commuted Black's 3-year federal sentence after Jackson and others had requested a pardon. As a child, Jackson's favorite player was Michael Vick. Vick inspired Jackson to mould his dual-threat style of play to his advantage as a quarterback in the NFL, later passing Vick's NFL record for career rushing yards by a quarterback on Christmas in 2024.

=== In popular culture ===
External videos
- Lamar Jackson on Celebrity Family Feud, Baltimore Ravens video

In 2019, Jackson appeared on ABC's Celebrity Family Feud. During the 2019 NFL season, Jackson's Madden NFL character speed was upgraded to 96, making Jackson the fastest quarterback in that game's history. Jackson was the cover athlete in the Madden NFL 21 video game.

In 2019, Pope Francis was gifted a signed Lamar Jackson Ravens jersey.

In February 2020, BET Digital highlighted Jackson as one of 40 of the most inspiring and innovative vanguards in African American culture and who are redefining what it means to be "unapologetically young, gifted & Black".

In March 2025, Jackson made a cameo appearance as E-Tone in the Starz crime drama series, Power Book III: Raising Kanan.

=== Business ventures ===
In 2018, Jackson also announced the launch of his sportswear line, Era 8 Apparel. In March 2020, he filed a federal lawsuit against Amazon, charging the corporate giant with engaging in the "deliberate and unauthorized use" of Jackson's name, image and persona. The suit also alleges that Amazon had unlawfully infringed on his right of publicity in connection with alleged "false advertising and endorsement of unlicensed and infringing articles of clothing."

In August 2020, Jackson signed an endorsement deal with Oakley, Inc., a company that produces sunglasses, sports goggles and football helmet visors.

In May 2022, it was announced that Jackson had entered the restaurant business with the purchase of a soul food restaurant in his home state of Florida. Tasty's Soul Food Sports Bar & Grill in Pompano Beach will change its name to Play Action Soulfood and More. In September 2022, Jackson posted on his Twitter that he would be the cover star of NFL's first virtual reality (VR) game. "NFL Pro Era" is the first VR NFL game is said to let users 'experience what it's like to compete as the QB of their favorite NFL team.' The game released on December 23, 2022, on PlayStation VR and Meta Quest. Jackson was again on the cover of the sequel game, NFL Pro Era II, which released on October 16, 2023.

=== Philanthropy ===
In 2018, Jackson founded The Forever Dreamers Foundation which supports children's welfare and mental health awareness. In December 2020, Jackson and his Dreamers Foundation distributed gifts and toys to more than 150 families in the Baltimore area. In April 2025, Jackson's Dreamers Foundation launched the Forever Dreamers 8 Scholars program. This apprenticeship program gives high school seniors in the Park Heights community a chance to work in Maryland's thoroughbred racing industry.

== Filmography ==
=== Television ===
Year	Title	Role	Notes	Ref.
2019	Celebrity Family Feud	Self	1 episode	
2025	Power Book III: Raising Kanan	E-Tone	1 episode	

== See also ==
- List of dual-threat quarterback records
- List of National Football League annual passing touchdowns leaders
- List of NFL career passer rating leaders
- List of NCAA major college football yearly total offense leaders
- List of NFL quarterbacks who have posted a perfect passer rating
