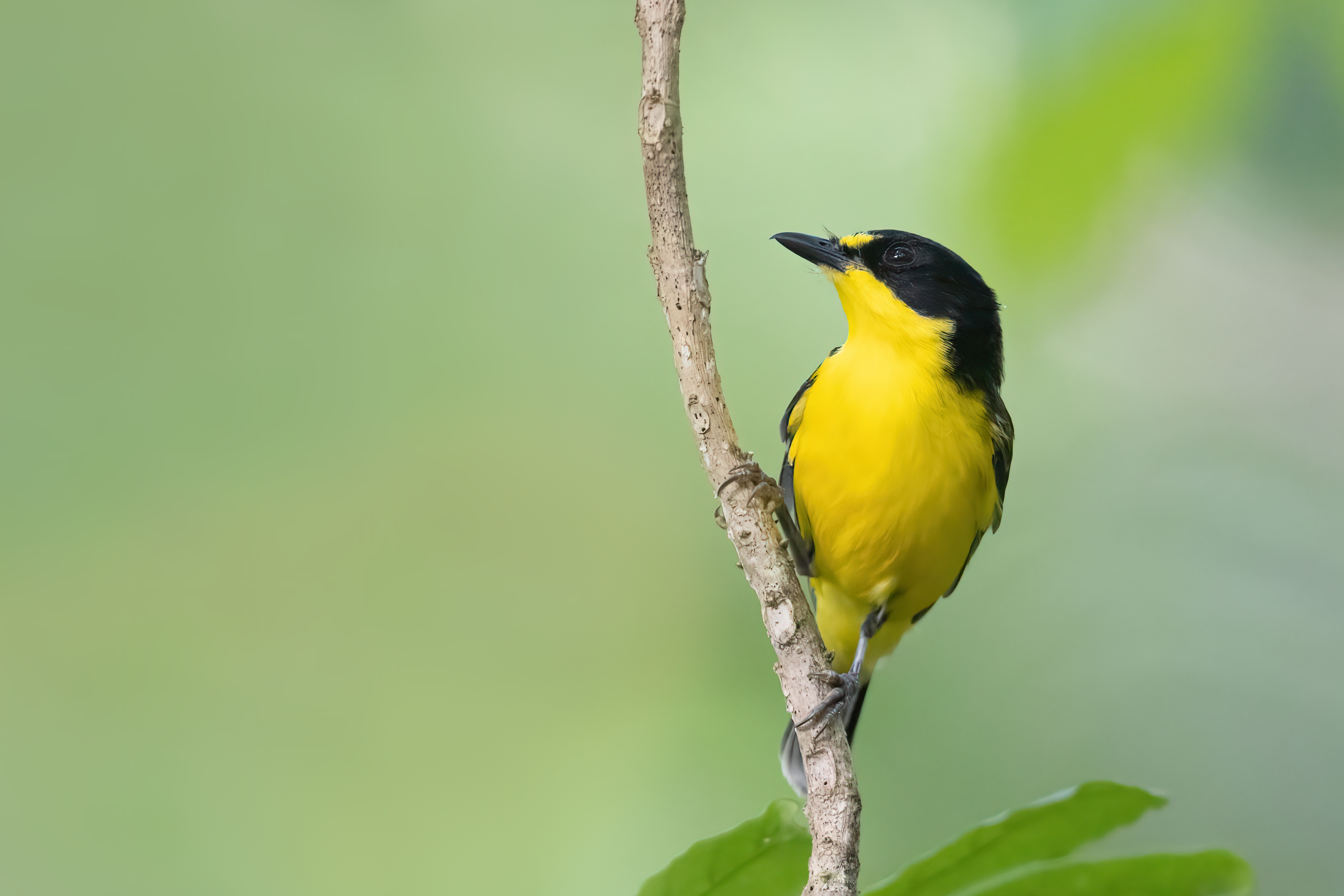
- Male on Viti Levu

Conservation status
- Not evaluated (IUCN 3.1)

Scientific classification
- Kingdom: Animalia
- Phylum: Chordata
- Class: Aves
- Order: Passeriformes
- Family: Pachycephalidae
- Genus: Pachycephala
- Species: P. graeffii

Binomial name
- Pachycephala graeffii Hartlaub, 1866

= Yellow-throated Fiji whistler =

Species of bird

The yellow-throated Fiji whistler (Pachycephala graeffii) is a species of passerine bird in the family Pachycephalidae, endemic to central Fiji. It was formerly considered to be conspecific with the white-throated Fiji whistler (Pachycephala vitiensis). Before the split the combined species were known as the "Fiji whistler".

== Taxonomy ==
The yellow-throated Fiji whistler was formally described in 1866 by the German ornithologist Gustav Hartlaub based on a specimen collected on the island of Viti Levu in Fiji. He coined the binomial name Pachycephala graeffii where the specific epithet was chosen to honour the Swiss naturalist Eduard Heinrich Graeffe.

The yellow-throated Fiji whistler was formerly considered as conspecific with the white-throated Fiji whistler (Pachycephala vitiensis). It is now treated as a separate species based on the differences in plumage and vocalizations.

Seven subspecies are recognised:

- P. g. bella Mayr, 1932 – Vatu Vara (central east Fiji, southwest Polynesia)
- P. g. koroana Mayr, 1932 – Koro (central Fiji, southwest Polynesia)
- P. g. torquata Layard, EL, 1875 – Taveuni (central north Fiji, southwest Polynesia)
- P. g. aurantiiventris Seebohm, 1891 – Yanganga (north of Vanua Levu) and Vanua Levu (except southeast coast; central north Fiji, southwest Polynesia)
- P. g. ambigua Mayr, 1932 – southeast Vanua Levu, Rabi and Kioa (east of northeast Vanua Levu; central north Fiji, southwest Polynesia)
- P. g. optata Hartlaub, 1866 – southeast coast Viti Levu and Ovalau (west Lomaiviti group; west, central west Fiji, southwest Polynesia)
- P. g. graeffii Hartlaub, 1866 – Waya (Yasawa Islands group) and Viti Levu (northwest, west Fiji, southwest Polynesia)
