= Red Digital Cinema =

American digital cinematography company

Red Digital Cinema, Inc.
- Type: Subsidiary
- Industry: Digital cinematography
- Founded: 2005; 21 years ago
- Founder: Jim Jannard
- Fate: Acquired by Nikon on April 8th, 2024
- Headquarters: Foothill Ranch, California, US
- Key people: Jarred Land (president, 2013-2024)
- Products: Epic; DSMC2; Komodo; Red One; Red Raven; V-Raptor; Scarlet
- Parent: Nikon Corporation; (2024–present)
- Website: reddigitalcinema.com

Red Digital Cinema is an American camera manufacturer specializing in digital cinematography headquartered in Foothill Ranch, California. The company became a subsidiary of Nikon in 2024.

Red has studios in Hollywood, Los Angeles, and has offices in London and Beijing, as well as a retail store in Hollywood. Additionally, Red has various authorized resellers and service centers worldwide. The company was founded by Jim Jannard in 2005 out of a side interest in digital photography. Jannard is the founder of eyewear company Oakley which shares a similar industrial design language.

== History ==
Red Digital Cinema was founded by Jim Jannard, who previously founded Oakley, Inc. As a self-described "camera fanatic" owning over 1,000 models, Jannard started the company with the intent to deliver a (relatively) affordable 4K digital cinema camera. Jannard dates the idea to a time when he bought a Sony HDR-FX1 video camera and learned that the files had to be converted with software from Lumiere HD and were not viewable on Mac OS. Lumiere HD's owner Frederic Lumiere collaborated with Jannard on developing an alternative and introduced him to Ted Schilowitz who became Red's first employee.

The early team members engaged in undisclosed research on how to make a digital camera feasible for Hollywood productions. Part of the process involved using 4K resolution instead of 2K, which was most common at the time. Another technical hurdle was to achieve the focusing quality of DSLR cameras without sacrificing frame rate. Part of Red's solution to this problem was developing a sensor with a physical size comparable to that of analog film. At the 2006 NAB Show, Jannard announced that Red would build a 4K digital cinema camera, called the Red One, and began taking pre-orders.

In March 2007, director Peter Jackson completed a camera test of two prototype Red One cameras, which became the 12-minute World War I film Crossing the Line. On seeing the short film, director Steven Soderbergh told Jannard: "I am all in. I have to shoot with this." Soderbergh took two prototype Red Ones into the jungle to shoot his film Che. A short documentary, Che and the Digital Revolution, was made about the Red camera technology that was used in the film's production. The Red One first shipped in August 2007. One of the first television programs to shoot with it was the medical drama ER.

In 2010, Red acquired the historic Ren-Mar Studios in Hollywood, and renamed it "Red Studios Hollywood". By 2011, it had over 400 employees. 2011 was also the year in which Panavision, Arri, and Aaton announced that they would no longer be producing analog cameras. Red Digital Cinema and the Red One were widely credited with accelerating this transition in the industry. Schilowitz responded by saying "It was never our goal to kill film. Instead, we wanted to evolve it."

In 2010, 5 of the top 100 grossing domestic films that were shot on digital video used Red cameras as their primary system. Their share increased to over 25% by 2016, but has declined since then.

On August 19, 2013, Jim Jannard announced his retirement from Red, leaving Jarred Land as president.

On March 7, 2024, Red Digital Cinema accepted a takeover of the company by Japanese camera equipment manufacturer Nikon Corporation for an undisclosed amount; this may be part of a growing interest of Nikon to expand into the digital cinema camera market. On April 12, 2024, Nikon announced that it had acquired 100% of the outstanding membership interests of Red Digital Cinema. Keiji Oishi, of Nikon's imaging business unit, assumed the role of CEO and Tommy Rios, the executive vice president of Red Digital Cinema, became co-CEO. Red's former president, Jarred Land, and James Jannard, Red's founder, remain as close advisors to the company.

On April 15, 2024, the Chief Design Officer of Red announced that he resigned to focus on his own venture Global Dynamic United (GDU), which mainly produces accessories for Red cameras.

On May 9, 2024, Nikon Corporation released their financial results report of the year ended March 31, 2024 and disclosed the amount paid, reported as "the deal of the century" in the camera industry: 13.1 billion yen, approximately $87 million US dollars (the currency exchange rate on April 8, 2024).

== Cameras ==
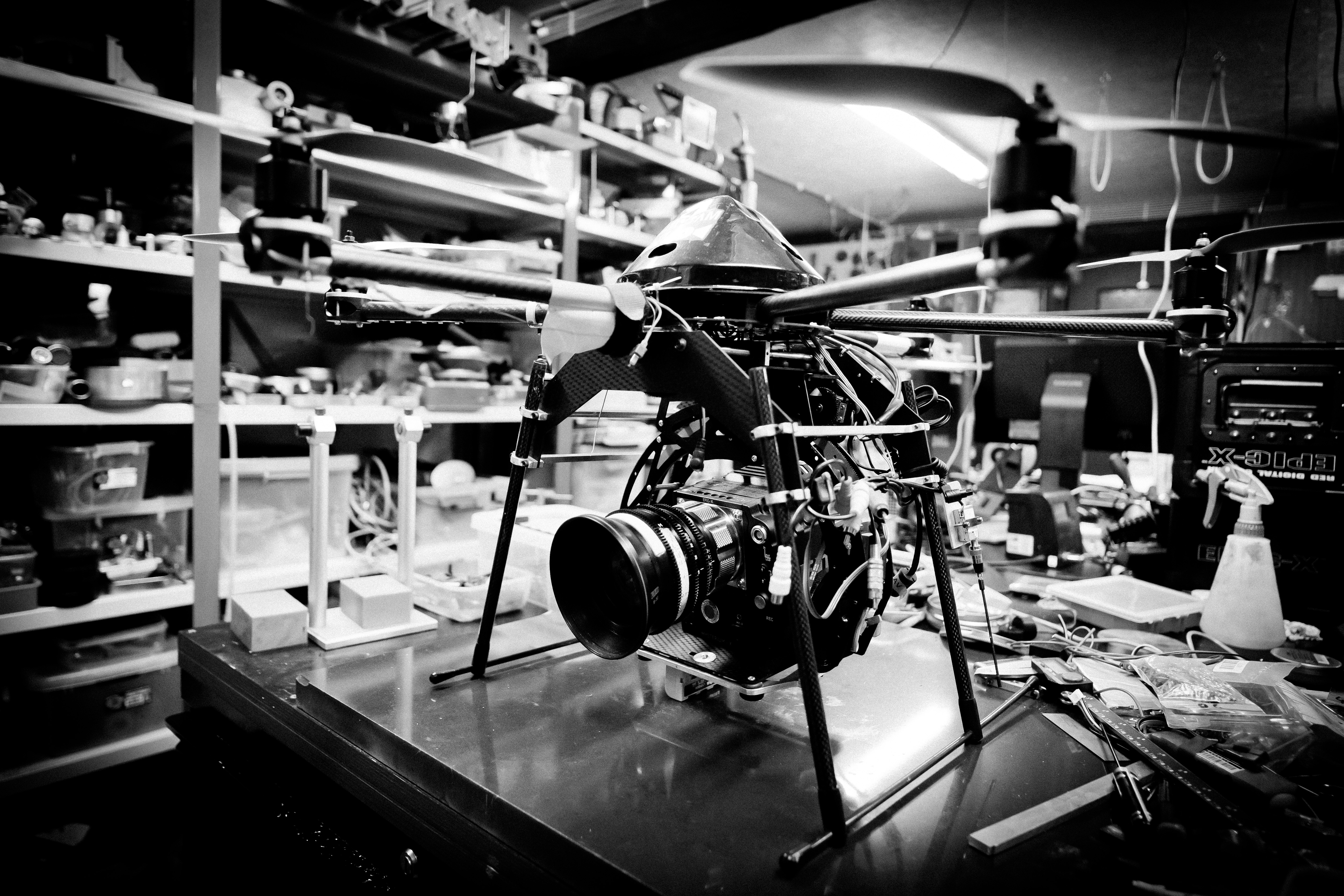
Red Epic-X with hexacopter, 2011

=== Red One ===
The Red One debuted in 2007 was Red Digital Cinema's first production camera. It captures up to 30 frames per second at 4K resolution and 120 frames per second at 2K resolution. Its "Mysterium" sensor was acquisitioned for use with the proprietary RAW format called Redcode. By 2010, Red began selling upgrades to a 14 megapixel sensor called the "Mysterium-X" or "M-X" for short. The Red One has been reviewed as having effectively the same quality as 35 mm film. The Red One was made out of aluminum alloy, and the body alone weighs 10 pounds (4.5 kg).

It was used to shoot Che, The Informant, The Social Network, and The Girl with the Dragon Tattoo.

=== DSMC system ===
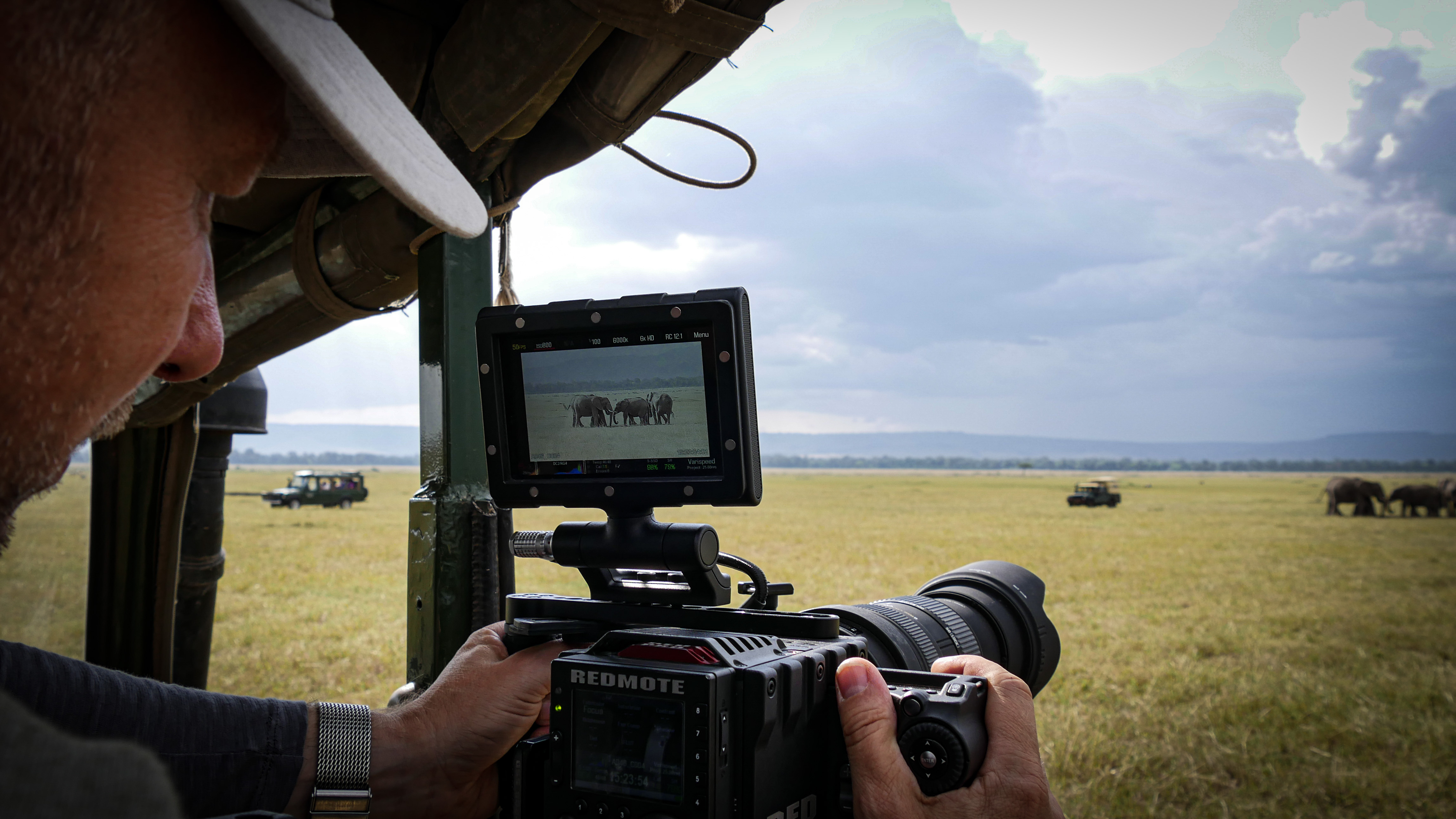
RED Epic Dragon capturing a safari

In 2009, Red began releasing new cameras with a much smaller form factor compared to the Red One. Designed to facilitate either still images or video, depending on the mounting setup, Red called the concept DSMC for "Digital Stills and Motion Capture". The first camera released for this system was the Epic-X, a professional digital stills and motion-capture camera with interchangeable lens mounts. The Scarlet-X was introduced later and provided lower end specifications at a more affordable price. Both cameras were initially equipped with a 5K imaging sensor, upgrades were later offered to a 6K sensor with higher dynamic range called the "Red Dragon". Other versions of the Scarlet with a 2/3"-sensor in 3K-resolution were planned, including one with a fixed 8-times zoom lens, but never sold.

The low weight and size of these cameras compared to other solutions available at the time made them popular for shooting high-budget 3D movies. The Red Epic was used to shoot The Amazing Spider-Man, The Hobbit, Prometheus, Pirates of the Caribbean: On Stranger Tides and The Great Gatsby as well as many other feature films.

=== DSMC2 system ===
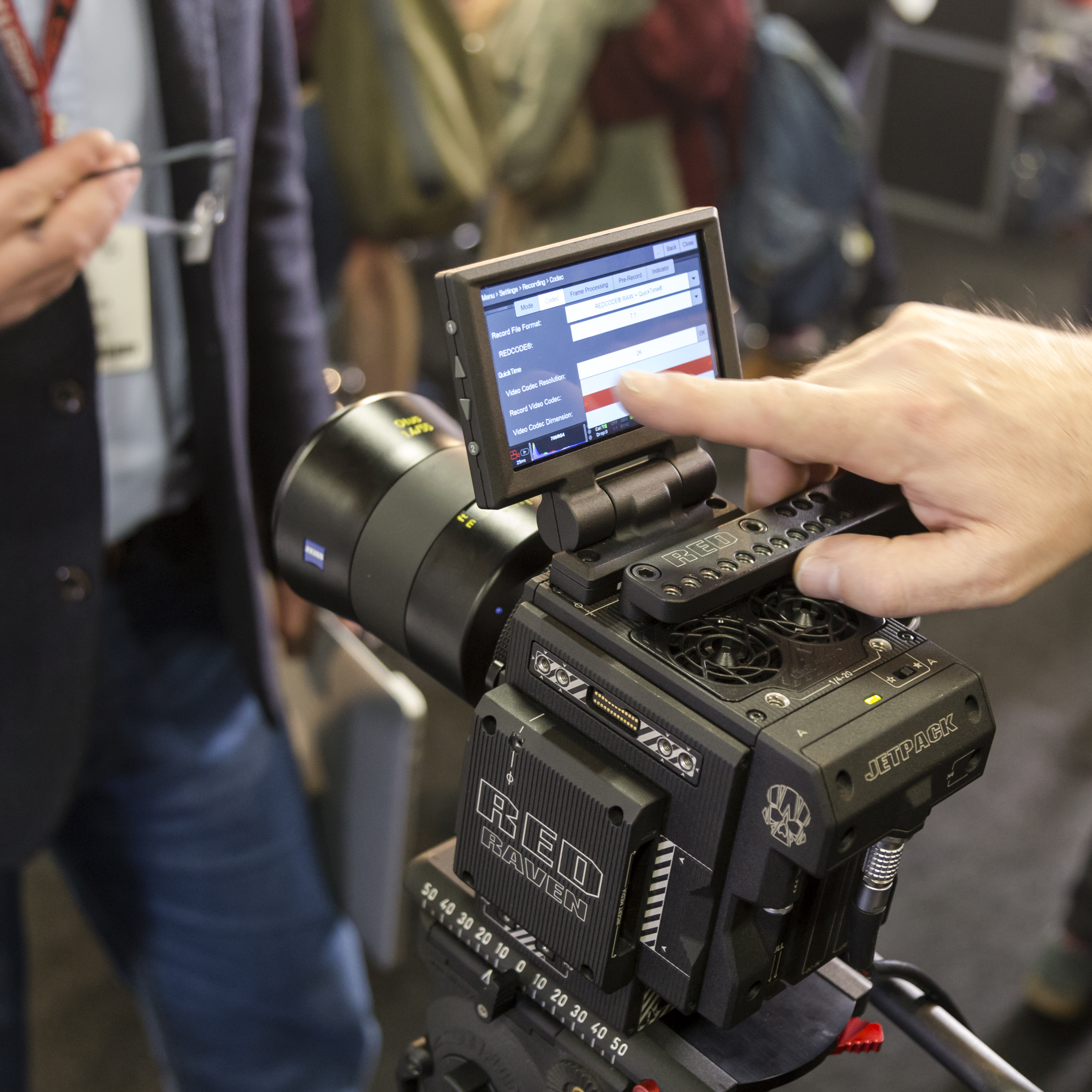
RED Raven Camera seen at the BSC Expo 2016

The DSMC2 family of cameras was introduced in 2015 as the new form factor for all cameras up to 2020. The Weapon 8K VV and Weapon 6K were the first two cameras announced within this line. They were followed by the Red Raven 4.5K and Scarlet-W 5K. Third-party capture formats, namely Apple ProRes and Avid DNxHD, were made available for these cameras.

In 2016, an 8K sensor called "Helium" was introduced with the two cameras Red Epic-W and Weapon 8K S35. In early January 2017, this was given the highest sensor score ever, 108, by the DxOMark website. Marvel Studios' Guardians of the Galaxy Vol. 2 was the first film to be released that was shot on the Weapon. The film was shot at the camera's full 8K resolution, and featured an equivalent workflow, supplanting director David Fincher's Gone Girl as the film with the highest-resolution post-production workflow.

=== DSMC3 System ===
In 2019, Jarred Land from Red announced the Red Komodo camera. In 2020, Red started to ship the "beta" stormtrooper white models of the Red Komodo to customers on the waitlist. The price for the beta cameras was US$6,995, with the regular black shipping models for US$5,995, body only. The Komodo camera features 6K video, super 35 sensor, a Canon RF lens mount, a dual BP battery plate, and a global shutter.

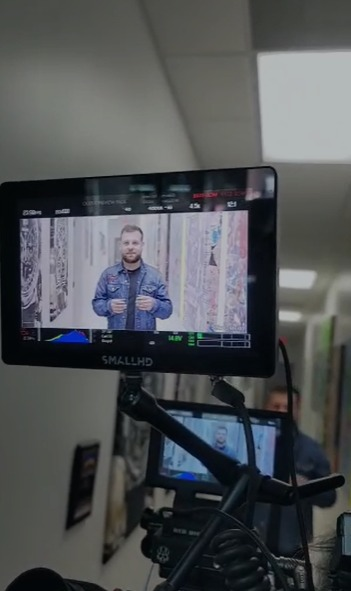
Red Digital Cinema (2023)

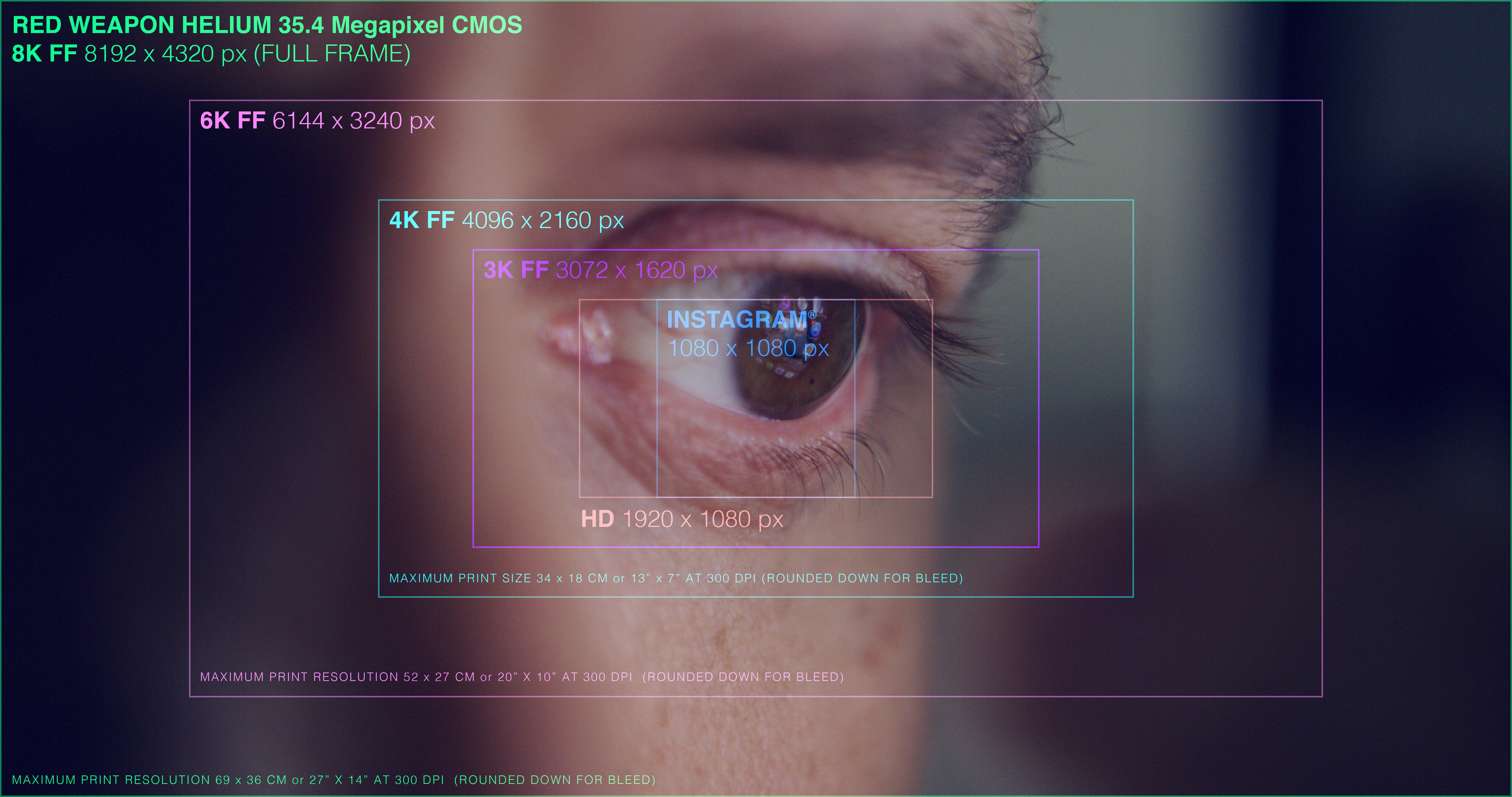
Red Weapon Helium 8K image showing 6K, 4K, 3K, HD and Instagram native resolution frame overlays Captured through a Canon FD 135 mm f/2.8 lens

In 2021, Red announced the Red V-Raptor camera, the first camera that officially belongs to the DSMC3 family of cameras. Like the Komodo, the Red V-Raptor also has an active Canon RF lens mount, but unlike the Komodo, the V-Raptor is capable of multi-format recording.

The V-Raptor features a VistaVision 8K sensor (40.96 mm x 21.60 mm) with the ability to crop to smaller formats like Super35. It is capable of recording full sensor 8K at 120 FPS (or 150 FPS cropped to 2.4:1), and high frame rates of up to 600 FPS in 2K. With an advertised dynamic range of 17 stops. It was launched priced at US$24,500, body only. Red would later release the V-Raptor XL in 2022, featuring a larger body with an expanded range of ports, internal ND filter, additional aux power, interchangeable lens mount, among other features.

In November 2022, Red announced the V-Raptor Rhino, a limited-edition version of the V-Raptor, but featuring an 8K Super35 sensor and a light grey color scheme. It was launched priced at US$19,500. In March 2023, the V-Raptor and V-Raptor XL S35 was launched. These cameras were identical to the previous V-Raptor and XL models and, like the V-Raptor Rhino, have Super35 sensors instead of the original VistaVision sensor.

In January 2024, the company launched the V-Raptor [X] and V-Raptor XL [X] cameras featuring a global shutter compared to the original V-Raptor and V-Raptor XL.

In February 2025, the company released Nikon Z-mount versions of the V-Raptor [X] and the Komodo-X cameras. On 9 September 2025, Red announced the V‑Raptor XE, also offering a Z-mount version besides the RF-mount variant.

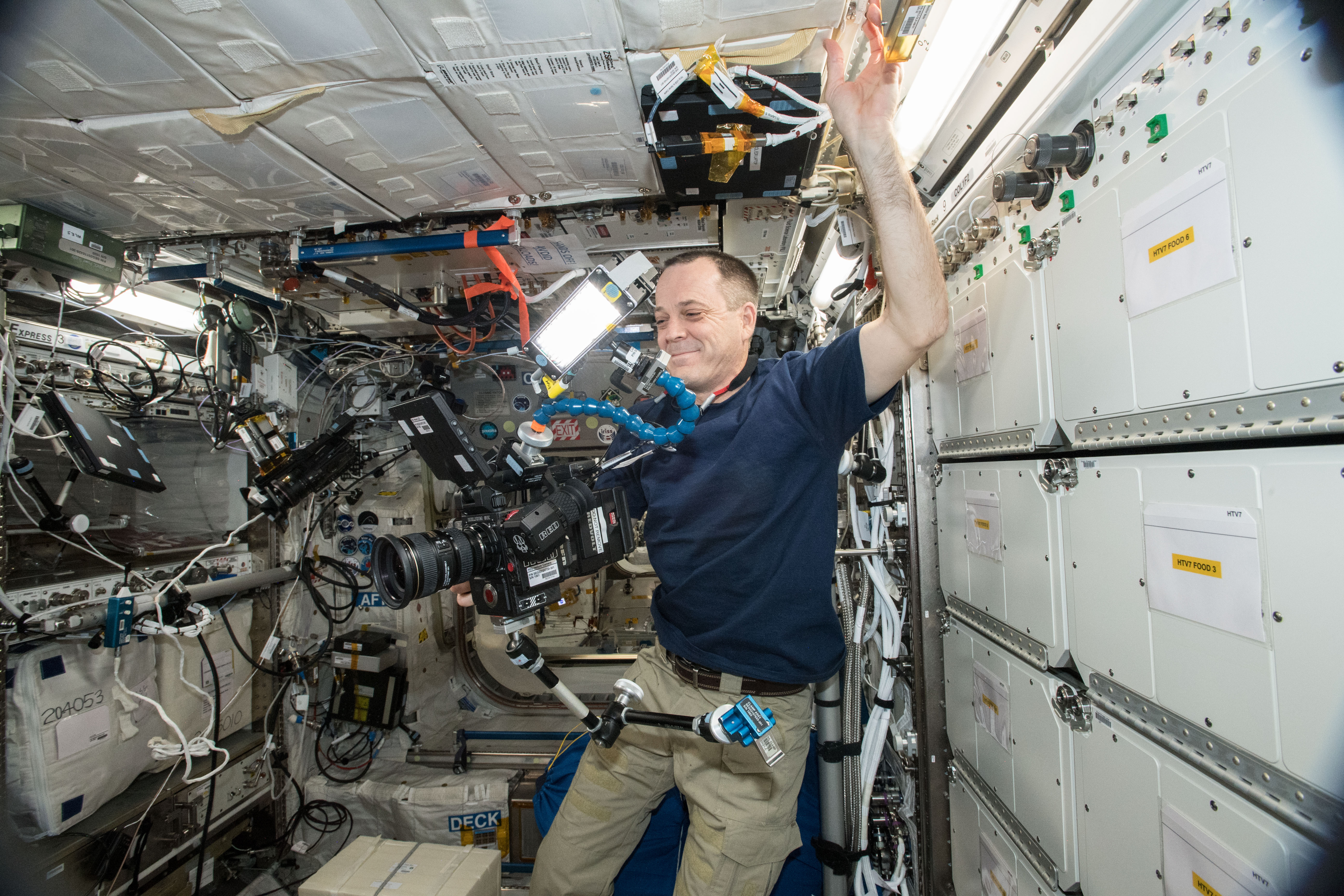
Ricky Arnold films aboard the International Space Station with a Helium 8K camera.

== Other products ==
=== Lenses ===
Red has offered PL mount prime and zoom lenses with Super 35 coverage alongside their Red One camera. They gave the lens manufacturer strict requirements on how the images produced by the lenses should look.

==== Primes ====
Name	Focal length	Aperture	Minimum focal distance
Pro Prime	18 mm	T1.8	4"
Pro Prime	25 mm	T1.8	4"
Pro Prime	35 mm	T1.8	4"
Pro Prime	50 mm	T1.8	6"
Pro Prime	85 mm	T1.8	18"
Pro Prime	100 mm	T1.8	24"
Pro Prime	300 mm	T2.9	7.36 ft.
Prime	300 mm	f2.8	??

The Red Prime 300 mm f2.8 lens was discontinued early.

==== Zooms ====
Name	Focal length	Aperture	Minimum focal distance
Pro Zoom	17–50 mm	T2.9	4"
Pro Zoom	18–85 mm	T2.9	8"
Zoom	18–50 mm	T3	8"
Zoom	50–150 mm	T3	3.6 ft.

Other lenses like a RED Mini Prime 6 mm T1.5 and a RED Mini Prime 50mm T2.9 with coverage for 2/3" inch sensors were planned but never sold.

=== Hydrogen One modular smartphone system ===
In 2017, Red announced their intentions to enter the smartphone market including planned features such as a 5.7" holographic display and integration with existing camera products. On May 18, 2018, Red announced the Hydrogen One, with a release date in August 2018. Promised features included a holographic display, spatial sound, compatibility with the Red camera program, the launch of a streaming service, and modular add-ons similar to the "Moto Mods" feature of Motorola's Moto Z. Especially the announced camera sensor module received attention, with Red founder Jannard claiming: "If you were shooting an 8K Weapon on set as your A camera, this could certainly be your B camera."

On release, the smartphone was a critical disappointment and was even cited as a contender for the worst technology product of 2018, arising from outdated hardware and a lack of capabilities. The phone was a commercial flop, and in 2019, promised modular add-ons vanished from Red's website, with Jannard announcing the company was "currently in the middle of radically changing the Hydrogen program". In late 2019, the company discontinued the product line.

=== Software ===
Red began selling its Redcine-X package for post-production workflow in 2009. The process of decompressing the sensor data can be sped up with a Red Rocket accelerator card. There is a downloadable SDK for working directly with the Redcode images, and another for controlling the cameras remotely.

=== Redray ===
Announced in 2012, released and showcased at NAB in 2013, the Redray Player was the first stand-alone device capable of providing 4K content to compatible 2D or 3D displays. A partnership with a platform called ODEMAX was also announced, where 4K content could be distributed with IP owners deciding how much it costs to watch. However the ODEMAX platform was never publicly available and the Redray never received broad attention. The device had a price drop in 2014, then vanished from the web store in 2015. Using a 1 TB internal drive for storage, the Redray plays 4K or HD media in the .red format. Red camera footage would have to be encoded from .r3d to .red using the RRENCODE plugin. The player uses 12-bit 4:2:2 precision. A theater laser projector in the same family was also announced in 2012 but never released.

== Lawsuits ==
On August 18, 2008, Red filed a lawsuit against the electronics company LG over its use of the name Scarlet. Red accused LG "of taking the 'Scarlet' brand name from the camera company" after Red had denied LG's request to use it.

On September 23, 2011, Jannard announced that his personal email account was compromised by former Arri executive Michael Bravin. A lawsuit against Arri and Bravin was filed at the end of 2011; it was settled and dismissed in 2013.

On June 27, 2012, Red sued Wooden Camera, a manufacturer of third-party accessories, for patent infringement.

In February 2013, Red filed for an injunction against Sony, claiming that several of its new CineAlta products, particularly the 4K-capable F65, infringed on patents the company held. They requested that Sony not only be forced to stop selling the cameras, but that they be destroyed as well. Sony filed a countersuit against Red in April 2013, alleging that Red's entire product line infringed on Sony patents. In July 2013, both parties filed jointly for dismissal, and as of July 20, 2013, the case is closed.

On March 2, 2017, Red filed a lawsuit against the maker of JinniMag, a third party copy of the Red Mini Mag. Videos posted on the Jinni.Tech YouTube channel have accused Red Digital Cinema Cameras of lying to their customers and possibly obtaining their patents by deceiving the USPTO.

In May 2019, Apple Inc. filed a lawsuit against Red.com, LLC over several patents relating to digital cinema cameras and sensor processing. Apple lost the case in November 2019. Apple argued that the patents related to Redcode Raw were "unpatentable", but a judge ruled that Apple's legal team had not provided sufficient evidence to back up their claims.

Red's RAW video patent that has resulted in multiple companies being sued by Red is US8872933. This US patent is scheduled to expire on April 11, 2028.

In July 2026 Red's Japanese RAW video patent JP5231529B2 was invalidated due to a lawsuit from Panasonic.

== See also ==
- List of large sensor interchangeable-lens video cameras
- List of Red Digital Cinema cameras
