= Jarred Land =

American film producer

Jarred Land (born May 30, 1975) is an American businessman, film producer, cinematographer, photographer, the former President and co-owner of the Red Digital Cinema Camera Company and the current CEO, Founder and co-owner of RSH Studios Hollywood.

== Career ==
In 2003, Jarred started the forum DVXuser.com to seek help from professionals about the use of his DVX100 camera. In 2004, he joined forces with Nick Bicanic to form Purposelabs to establish himself in the cinematography industry. On DVXuser.com, he met Jim Jannard, the founder of Red Digital Camera. In 2006, Land introduced REDuser.net because of the rapid increase in the number of users of the RED section and to educate people about the use of a RED camera that was in the process of development at that time. After collaborating on several projects with Jannard, Land took over Red Digital Cinema Camera Company upon the resignation of Jannard in 2013.

He has over 100 patents awarded to his name.

== Filmography ==
Year	Film	Roles	Notes
2004	DVXlabs Filter Tests	Producer, editor, co-cinematographer	Video documentary
2005	Sleepover Nightmare	Cinematographer, editor	
2006	Shadow Company	Cinematographer	Documentary
2006	HVX BootCamp DVD Vol. 1 - Camera Ops	Producer	
2007	HVX BootCamp DVD Vol. 2 - Post	Producer	
2011	Tattoo	Executive producer	Short
2012	Ridley Scott's LOOM	Producer	Short
2012	Down and Dangerous	Associate Producer	Short
