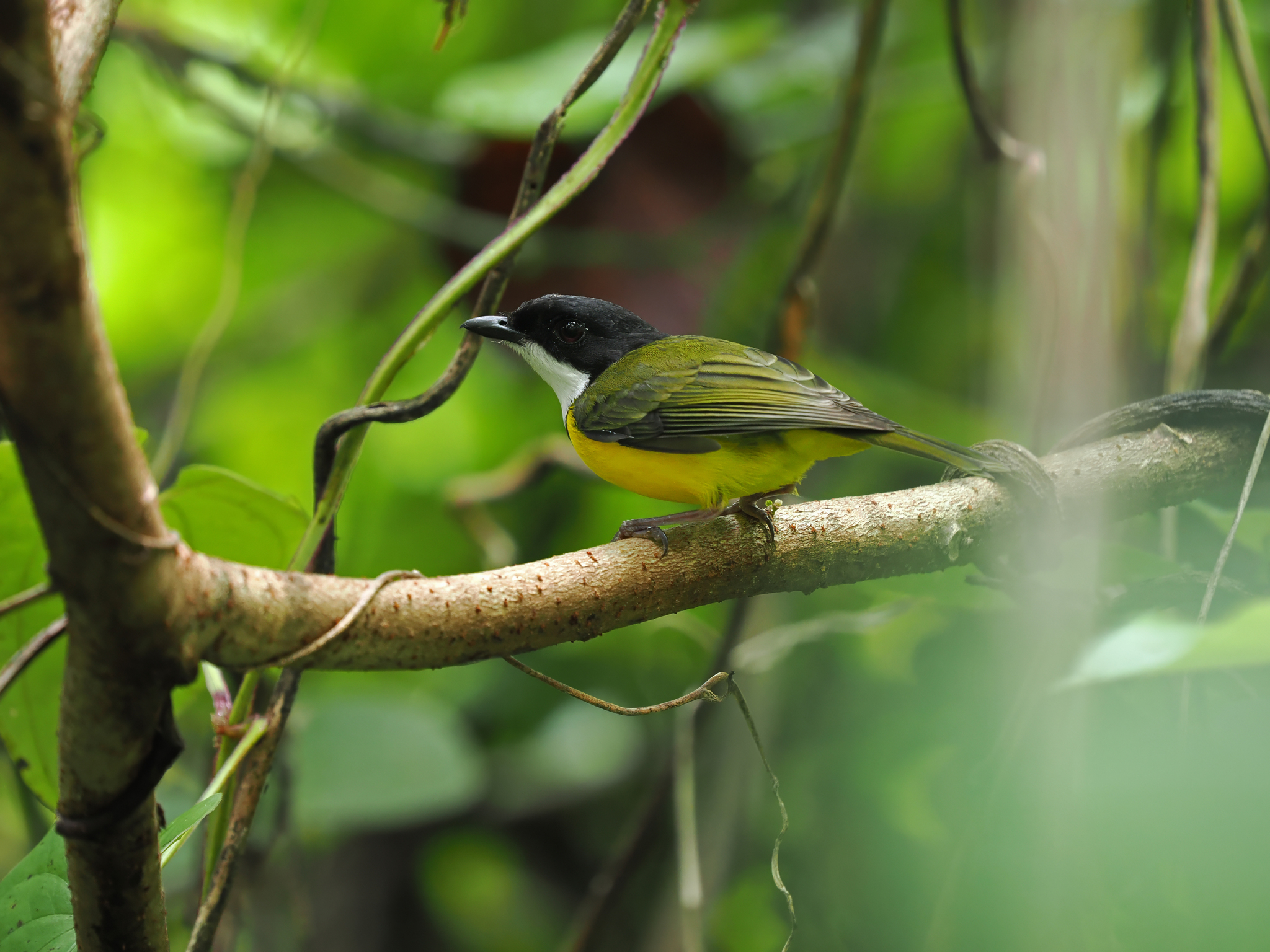

Conservation status
- Least Concern (IUCN 3.1)

Scientific classification
- Kingdom: Animalia
- Phylum: Chordata
- Class: Aves
- Order: Passeriformes
- Family: Pachycephalidae
- Genus: Pachycephala
- Species: P. vitiensis

Binomial name
- Pachycephala vitiensis Gray, GR, 1860

Synonyms
- Pachycephala graeffii; Pachycephala pectoralis vitiensis

= White-throated Fiji whistler =

Species of bird

The white-throated Fiji whistler (Pachycephala vitiensis) is a species of bird in the family Pachycephalidae, endemic to islands in southern Fiji. It was formerly considered to be conspecific with the yellow-throated Fiji whistler (Pachycephala graeffii). Before the split the combined species were known as the "Fiji whistler".

== Taxonomy and systematics ==
It was variably considered a subspecies of a widespread golden whistler (P. pectoralis). Three of the subspecies of the former white-throated whistler (P. v. kandavensis, lauana, and vitiensis) were lumped with the Fiji whistler in 2014 by the IOC. The Temotu whistler was formerly considered conspecific with the Fiji whistler.

Three subspecies are recognised:

- P. v. kandavensis Ramsay, EP, 1876 – Beqa (south of Viti Levu) and Kadavu Island and satellites (southwest Fiji, southwest Polynesia)
- P. v. lauana Mayr, 1932 – south Lau Islands (southeast Fiji, southwest Polynesia)
- P. v. vitiensis Gray, GR, 1860 – Gau (central Fiji, southwest Polynesia)
