= Boynton Beach Community High School =

Location
- 4975 Park Ridge Blvd; Boynton Beach, Florida 33426; United States
- 26.5413°N 80.0839°W

Information
- Type: Public (magnet) secondary
- Established: 2001
- School district: Palm Beach County School District
- Principal: Moody Fuller
- Teaching staff: 87.00 (FTE)
- Grades: 9–12
- Enrollment: 1,546 (2023–2024)
- Student to teacher ratio: 17.77
- Campus: Suburban
- Colors: Purple, gold
- Mascot: Bengal Tiger
- Nickname: Tigers
- Website: bbhs.palmbeachschools.org//

Boynton Beach Community High School is a public high school located in Boynton Beach, Florida, United States, and it serves grades 9–12 in the School District of Palm Beach County. Boynton Beach High school has been rated a "C" for the year 2017–2018 by the Florida Department of Education and School District of Palm Beach County.

== Academic partnerships ==
Boynton Beach community High School has partnerships with Embry–Riddle Aeronautical University, Palm Beach State College, and Florida Atlantic University where students can dual-enroll to obtain college credit while still in high school.

== Activities ==
The school's choir, Dimensional Harmony, was established in the first year the school opened, and has since earned Superiors at the district and state levels. In 2015, Dimensional Harmony was invited to sing in London.

The arts department of Boynton Beach High was featured on PBS's Good Sports: Inside the lobby of a local movie theater, they created a giant mural featuring the blockbuster movies from the summer of 2015.

== Notable alumni ==
- Jessica Ramsey (2010), shot-putter, 2020 Olympian
- Lamar Jackson (2015), NFL quarterback, 2x NFL MVP
- Kelani Jordan (2016), professional wrestler, WWE
- Abraham Beauplan (2018), NFL linebacker
