= Kaibu =

Island in Fiji's Lau archipelago

Coordinates: 17°15′S 179°29′W

- Location within Fiji

Geography
- Location: South Pacific Ocean
- Archipelago: Lau Islands
- Adjacent to: Koro Sea
- Area: 2 km^{2} (0.77 sq mi)

Administration
- Fiji
- Division: Northern
- Province: Cakaudrove
- Tikina: Cakaudrove

Kaibu (pronounced [kaˈimbu]) is an island in Fiji's Lau archipelago. A 22.4-kilometre-long (13.9 mi) reef encompasses Kaibu and the neighbouring island of Yacata, from which Kaibu is separated by a lagoon. The island, which has an area of about 2 square kilometres (0.77 sq mi), is located 56 kilometres (35 mi) west of Vanua Balavu. Fishing, snorkeling, and water sports are among the tourist attractions of the island.

Kaibu is privately owned by James Jannard, the founder of Oakley Inc., who built the Vatuvara Resort on the island. Previously it had been owned by Jay Johnson, the American fibreglass mogul.
