= Vatu Vara =

Island in Lau Islands, Fiji

Coordinates: 17°26′S 179°32′W

- Vatu Vara from west

- Location within Fiji

Geography
- Location: Fiji
- Archipelago: Lau Islands
- Highest elevation: 305 m (1001 ft)

Administration
- Fiji
- Division: Eastern Division
- Province: Lau Province
- District: Lau Other Islands

Demographics
- Population: 0

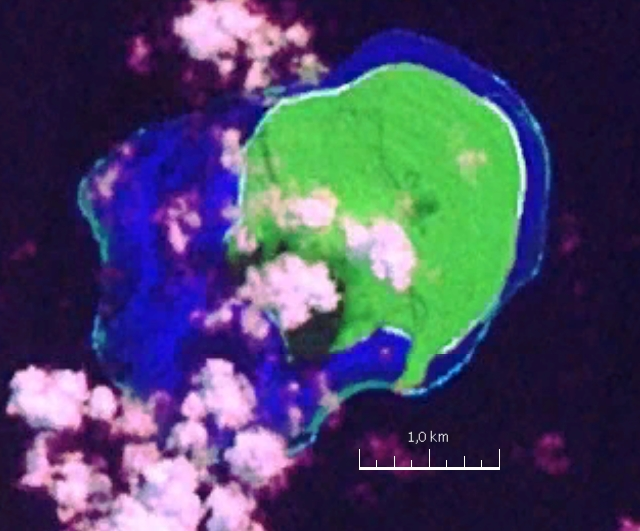
NASA Geocover 2000 satellite image

Vatu Vara Island is a Fijian island in the northwest sector of the Lau Group of islands.

The island is 3 km (1.9 mi) in diameter at the base of its 305-metre-high (1,001 ft) summit and is also referred to as "Hat Island" due to the summit's shape. The limestone cliffs, some 60 metres (200 feet) in height, of the guyot and the rest of the island are covered in dense tropical jungle.

== Geography ==
Vatu Vara is located 32 km (20 mi) west of Mago Island and some 60 km (37 mi) south-west of Vanua Balavu at Lat: 17° 26'00 S Long: 179° 31'00 W.

The volcanic and limestone island is nearly 2 miles (3.2 km) in diameter at its base. Its 305-metre (1,001 ft) summit, the highest in Lau, is a massive truncated pyramid bounded on all sides by almost perpendicular cliffs up to 200 feet (61 m) in height. The crest of the pyramid is some 40 acres (160,000 m^{2}) in extent, and is generally flat, although pitted with holes and depressions from 6–30 feet (1.8–9.1 m) deep, some of them filled with water. At its base there is in most places a wide belt of gently sloping land, standing not more than 25 feet (7.6 m) above sea level, and forming the brim of the hat suggesting the island's profile. On the northern and eastern edges of the island the sea breaks against the limestone cliffs, which are deeply undercut; but elsewhere the island is circled by a broad fringing reef, which, off the western coast swings sharply away from the shore to enclose the lagoon. The precipitous sides of the central mass are scored by three shallow terraces, marking pauses in the uplift of the island; but these are not readily observed, being smothered under the dense vegetation that clothes the whole towering structure.

The island is a former atoll, specifically called a “Guyot”. This is an extinct volcano that has become overgrown by coral reefs to form an atoll. The flat top was once at sea level, hence the flat summit. Its distinctive size and hat-like shape is recognizable from over thirty-five miles (56 km) away, including from nearby islands such as Kaibu, Yacata, and Vanua Balavu.

The island is privately owned by James Jannard.

== Vakatawa kei Vatuvara (Guardian of Vatuvara) ==
The traditional mythical guardian of Vatu Vara is a sea goddess (or nymph) named Sakulawe. In Yadrana, Lakeba, the Turaga Vaka family have one of their elderly matriarch named after Sakulawe, as a token of respect to one of their late blood relatives and a chief of Vuna: Ratu Masiwini; Masiwini is the great-grandfather of current Fiji National Provident Fund CEO Aisake Taito, married to the daughter of Ratu Sir Kamisese Mara.

== See also ==
- Desert island
- List of islands
