= Jim Jannard =

American businessman

James Jannard
- Born: June 8, 1949 (age 77); Los Angeles, California, U.S.
- Education: University of Southern California (dropped out)
- Occupation: Businessman
- Known for: Founder of Oakley; Founder of Red Digital Cinema

James Jannard (born June 8, 1949) is an American designer, businessman and founder of Oakley, an eyewear and apparel company; and Red Digital Cinema Camera Company.

== Early life and career ==
Jannard was born in Los Angeles, the son of a pharmacist. He was raised in Alhambra, California, and graduated from Alhambra High School. He attended the USC School of Pharmacy, but dropped out to travel the southwestern U.S. on a motorcycle.

In 1975, Jannard started a one-man business selling motorcycle parts out of his car at motocross events. He named his company after his dog, Oakley. He began developing his own products, including custom handlebar grips that conformed to the shape of one's hand, motorcycle goggles, ski goggles and sunglasses. Oakley sunglasses were used by bicycle racer Greg LeMond, raising the company's profile. In the 1980s, Jannard restricted the sale of Oakley sunglasses to the Sunglass Hut, although small specialty shops could continue to sell Oakley sunglasses. In 1991, his company had 200 employees. In 1995, the company went public. Jannard sold Oakley in November 2007 for $2.1 billion to Italian company Luxottica.

In 2005, Jannard started Red Digital Cinema Camera Company, a manufacturer of digital movie cameras. In 2009, he was named one of the 100 Most Creative People by Fast Company magazine.

On Oct. 24, 2019, Jannard announced his retirement, citing his age and "a few health issues."

== Personal life ==
Jannard owns the Fiji islands of Kaibu and Vatu Vara. He also owns the 500-acre Spieden Island in the San Juan Islands archipelago. In 1999, Jannard purchased two properties in Newport Beach, California for about $15 million. On June 18, 2024, the Los Angeles Times announced that Jannard had sold his Malibu oceanfront estate for $210 million, setting a California state record.
