= Oakley, Inc. =

Manufacturer of sports eyewear owned by EssilorLuxottica

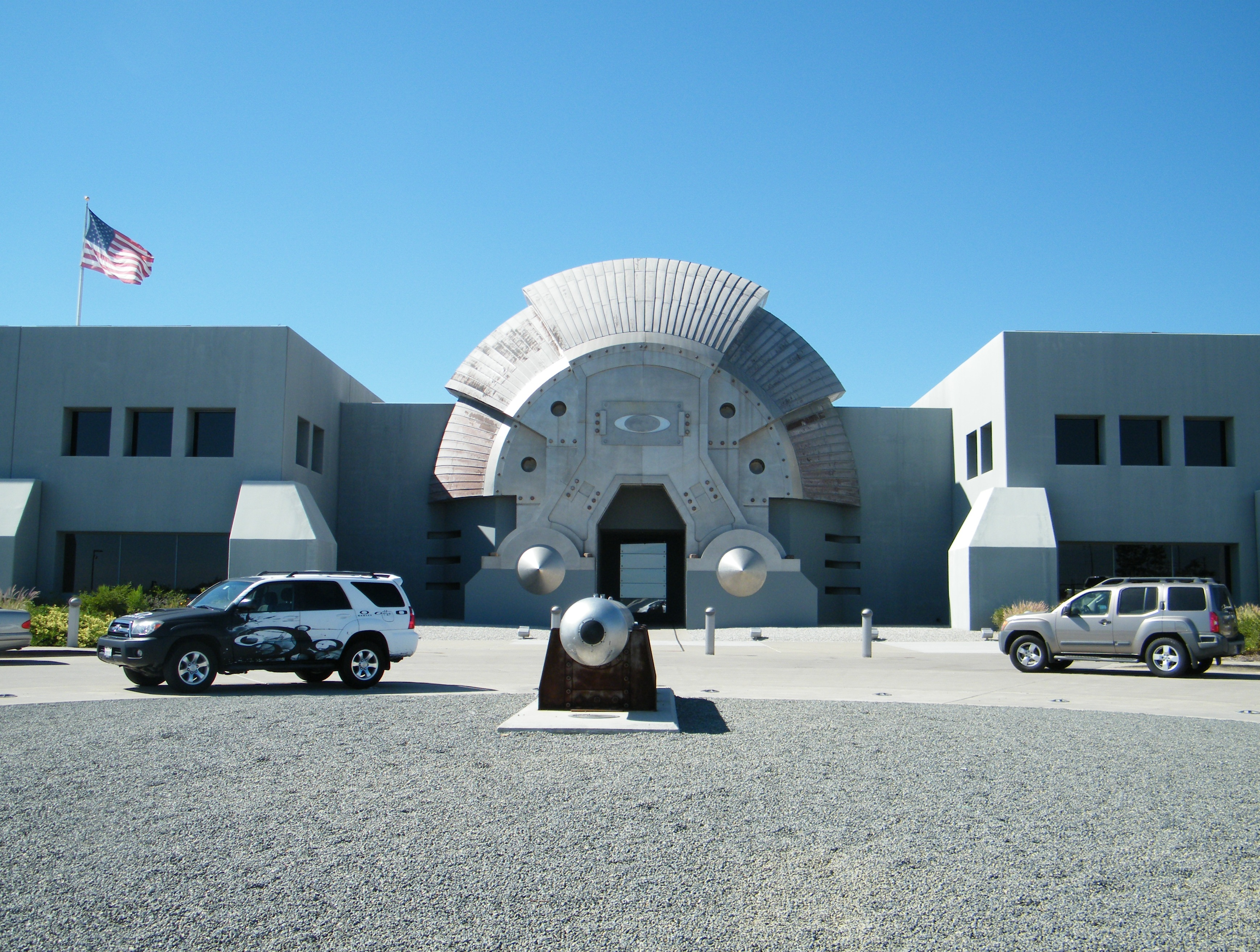
- Oakley headquarters in Foothill Ranch
- Type: Subsidiary
- Industry: Sunglasses; Clothing; Sports equipment
- Founded: 1975; 51 years ago
- Founder: Jim Jannard
- Headquarters: Foothill Ranch, California, U.S.
- Key people: Jim Jannard (chairman)
- Parent: Luxottica (2007-present)
- Subsidiaries: ESS (Eye Safety Systems); Oliver Peoples
- Website: www.oakley.com

Oakley, Inc. is a company headquartered in Foothill Ranch, California, which is an autonomous subsidiary of the Italian eyewear group Luxottica. The company designs, develops and manufactures sports performance equipment and lifestyle pieces including sunglasses, safety glasses, eyeglasses, sports visors, ski/snowboard goggles, watches, apparel, backpacks, shoes, optical frames, and other accessories. Most items are designed in house at their head office, but some countries hold exclusive designs relevant to their market. Oakley currently holds more than 600 patents for eyewear, materials, and performance gear.

== History ==
Oakley was started by Jim Jannard in 1975 in his garage with an initial investment of $300. The name "Oakley" came from Jim's English Setter, "Oakley Anne". Jannard began by selling what he called 'The Oakley Grip' out of the back of his car at motocross events. His motorcycle grips were unlike other grips available at the time. The material is still used to make the earsocks on Oakley glasses, and many of the nose pieces and now the bands of their watches. Oakley went on to produce number plates, gloves, grips, elbow guards, chin guards, and goggles for the BMX and motocross communities.

In 1980, Jannard released a pair of goggles called the O-Frame. With the 'Oakley' logo present on the strap, the brand garnered increasing recognition and prominence throughout the sports industry. In 1983, Oakley began selling ski goggles.

The first Oakley sunglasses, Factory Pilot Eyeshades, were sport-oriented, resembling goggles and were released in 1984. These were followed in 1985 by the Oakley Frogskin, a casual sunglass style that was made in Japan.

The company went public in 1995, raising $230 million.

In early 1996, Oakley had a pricing dispute with Italian company Luxottica, the world's largest eyewear manufacturers and retailers. Luxottica stopped carrying Oakley's products in its stores, including Sunglass Hut, and Oakley's stock market value declined 33%.

In 2001, Oakley bought Iacon, Inc., operator of mall-based sunglasses stores Sunglass Designs, Sporting Eyes, and Occhiali da Sole.

Oakley signed a four-year agreement to manufacture eyewear designed by themselves and Fox Racing in September 2004.

Starting in 2004, Jannard bought large quantities of Oakley stock: $2 million in 2004, $16 million in 2005, and $4.6 million in early 2006, bringing his personal stake in the company to 63%.

In 2006, Oakley acquired the Oliver Peoples group, a manufacturer of high-end fashion branded eyewear (under the Oliver Peoples, Mosley Tribes, and Paul Smith brands) for $55.7m, and Optical Shop of Aspen, a luxury eyewear retailer with fourteen stores. Later in 2006, Oakley acquired Eye Safety Systems, Inc. (ESS), another major manufacturer of tactical eye protection, for US$110m.

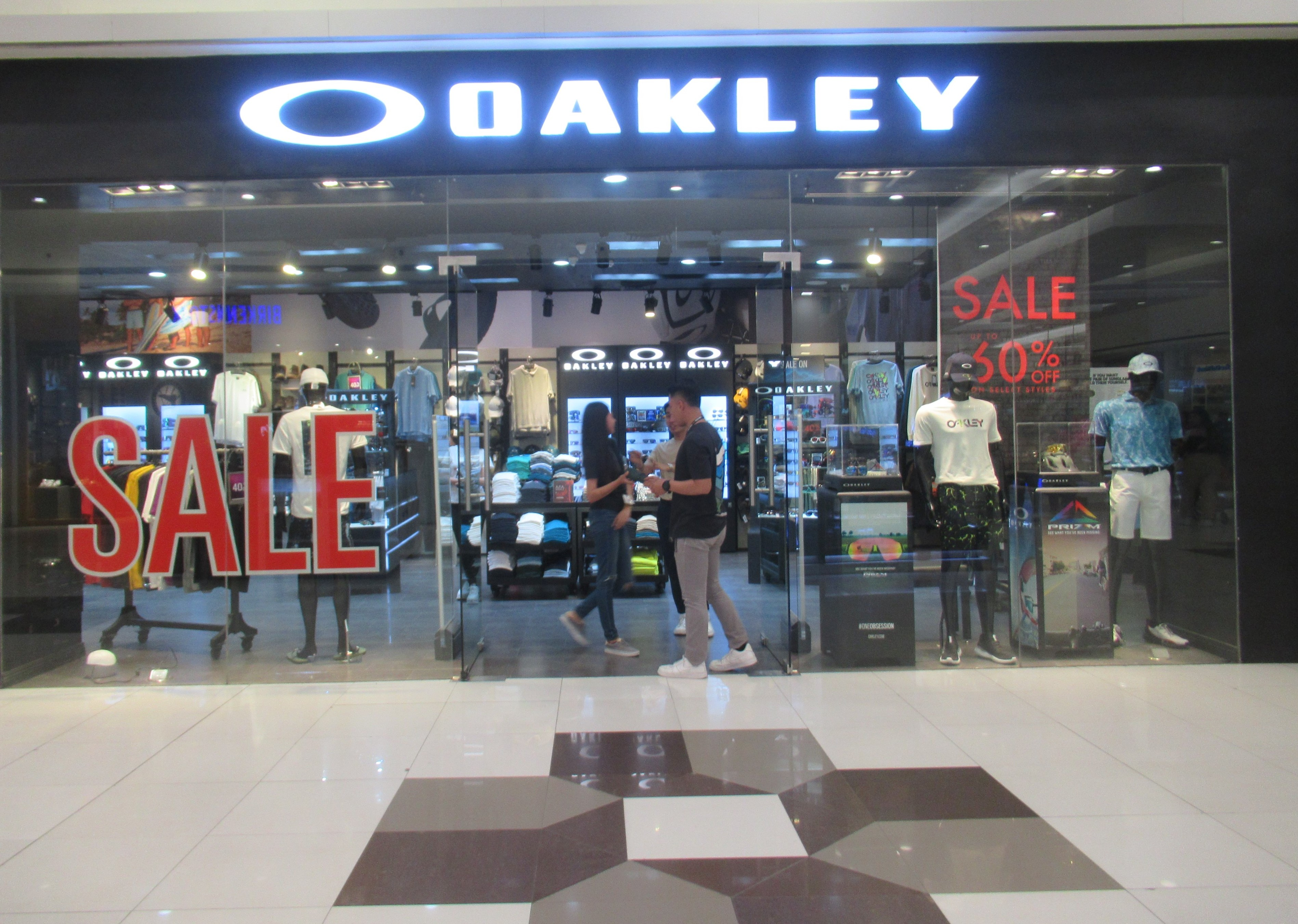
A mall shop Oakley at the SM City Pampanga in the Philippines

On June 21, 2007, Luxottica announced a plan to purchase Oakley in a cash deal worth $2.1 billion, paying a 16% premium over the extant share price. The deal was completed on November 15, 2007, making Oakley part of a portfolio that includes brands such as Ray-Ban, Persol, and Vogue. After the sale, founder James Jannard went on to found Red Digital Cinema. Luxottica's acquisition of Oakley was criticized as a potential violation of antitrust laws. This move also moved more of Oakley's manufacturing out of the US and portions of its sunglasses frames and lenses began to be produced in China and Italy.

During the preparations for the ultimately successful rescue of thirty-three miners trapped for ten weeks in a Chilean mine in October 2010, a journalist covering the story contacted Oakley about donating sunglasses to the rescue effort, aware that the miners would need eye protection after having spent weeks in darkness. Oakley donated 35 pairs of its Radar sports glasses, fitted with specially selected tints.

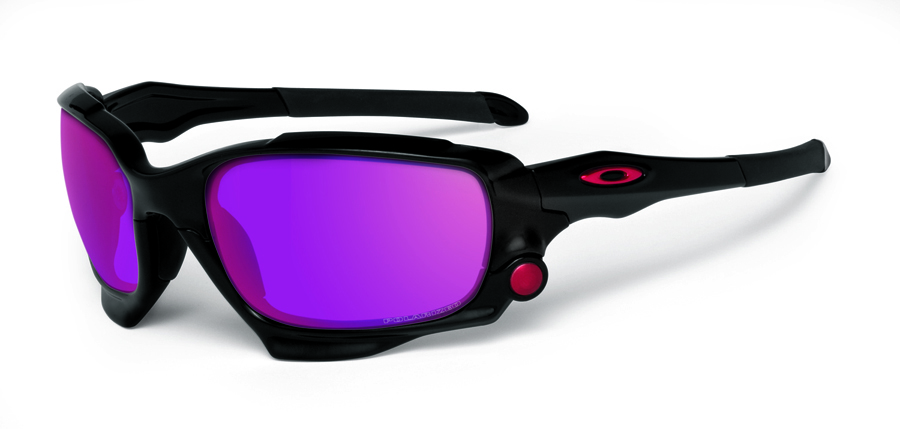
A pair of Oakley sunglasses

Oakley sponsored members of the US Olympic Team in 2012, and that same year, extended the partnership through 2020.

In August 2013, Oakley sold its REVO brand to Sequential Brands for $20m. In November 2013, Oakley signed a multi-year deal with Scuderia Ferrari.

In September 2015, Oakley shut down the website of its outlet arm Oakley Vault, while continuing its brick and mortar retail presence of the brand.

In March 2021, Aston Martin F1 Team announced a partnership with Oakley.

Also, Oakley collaborated with Meta Platforms on the Oakley Meta HSTN, a line of smart glasses based on Oakley's HSTN frame design and positioned for athletes and sports fans, with features including Meta AI and 3K video capture.

== Design ==
Most of Oakley's technological designs, fashion pieces, gear, etc. were developed with extensive athlete input and testing in the field – including extreme conditions. Oakley also maintains US Standard Issue, which provides U.S. military and law enforcement eye protection. Oakley M Frame sunglasses are included as part of the U.S. Army's Authorized Protective Eyewear List (APEL), and have been assigned a National Stock Number (NSN) for ordering through military supply channels. The company has also built at least one 'golf hovercraft', demonstrated as an all terrain replacement for conventional golf carts. This hovercraft was created for marketing purposes, in partnership with the professional golfer, Bubba Watson. During the COVID-19 pandemic, Oakley released the MSK3 mask, which featured an innovative design to prevent eyewear fogging.
