= Domain Lake =

- Location in Ontario
- Location: Kenora District, Ontario
- Coordinates: 50°57′34″N 94°34′37″W
- Type: lake
- Part of: Hudson Bay drainage basin
- Primary outflows: Domain Creek
- Basin countries: Canada
- Max. length: 8.9 km (5.5 mi)
- Max. width: 2.3 km (1.4 mi)
- Surface elevation: 371 m (1,217 ft)

Domain Lake is a lake in the Unorganized Part of Kenora District in Northwestern Ontario, Canada. It is in the Hudson Bay drainage basin, is within Woodland Caribou Provincial Park, and is the source of Domain Creek.

There are numerous unnamed inflows. The primary outflow, at the southwest and leading towards Hansen Lake, is Domain Creek, which flows via the Rostoul River, the Gammon River, the Bloodvein River, Lake Winnipeg, and the Nelson River to Hudson Bay.

== See also ==
- List of lakes in Ontario
