= List of lakes of Ontario: H =

This is a list of lakes of Ontario beginning with the letter H.

== Haa–Ham ==
- Haas Lake (Thunder Bay District)
- Haas Lake (Haliburton County)
- Habermehl Lake
- Hachey Lake
- Hackett Lake (Thunder Bay District)
- Hackett Lake (York Region)
- Hackford Lake
- Hacking Lake
- Hackle Lake
- Haddad Lake
- Haddock Lake
- Haddow Lake
- Hades Lake (Sprat Lake, Thunder Bay District)
- Hades Lake (Styx Creek, Thunder Bay District)
- Hadlington Lake
- Hadwen Lake
- Haentschel Lake
- Haf Lake
- Hafer Lake
- Hag Lake
- Hagan Lake
- Hagarty Lake (Thunder Bay District)
- Hagarty Lake (Sudbury District)
- Hagen Lake
- Haggart Lake (Kenora District)
- Haggart Lake (Muskoka District)
- Haggart Lake (Cochrane District)
- Hague Lake
- Hahn Lake
- Haig Lake (Algoma District)
- Haig Lake (Kenora District)
- Haig Lake (Thunder Bay District)
- Haighton Lake
- Hail Lake (Kenora District)
- Hail Lake (Sudbury District)
- Haile Lake
- Hailey Lake
- Hailstone Lake (Parry Sound District)
- Hailstone Lake (Kenora District)
- Hailstorm Lake
- Haines Lake (Parry Sound District)
- Haines Lake (Algoma District)
- Hainsworth Lake
- Hakala Lake
- Haken Lake
- Hakli Lake
- Halcrow Lake (Sudbury District)
- Halcrow Lake (Algoma District)
- Halden Lake
- Hale Lake (Kenora District)
- Hale Lake (Algoma District)
- Halet Lake
- Haley Lake (Lennox and Addington County)
- Haley Lake (Hastings County)
- Haley Lake (Lanark County)
- Haley Lake (Renfrew County)
- Half Mile Lake
- Half Moon Lake
- Half Shot Lake
- Halfmile Lake (Renfrew County)
- Halfmile Lake (Nipissing District)
- Halfmoon Lake (Nipissing District)
- Halfmoon Lake (Algoma District)
- Halfmoon Lake (Kenora District)
- Halfmoon Lake (Cochrane District)
- Halfmoon Lake (Rainy River District)
- Halfpenny Lake
- Halfpint Lake
- Halfway Lake (Muskoka District)
- Halfway Lake (Thunder Bay District)
- Halfway Lake (Jack Township, Sudbury District)
- Halfway Lake (Loughrin Township, Sudbury District)
- Halfway Lake (Antrim Township, Sudbury District)
- Halfway Lake (Renfrew County)
- Halfway Lake (Cochrane District)
- Halfway Lake (Algoma District)
- Haliburton Lake
- Halifax Lake
- Hall Lake (Glass Township, Kenora District)
- Hall Lake (Gravel River, Thunder Bay District)
- Hall Lake (Hall Creek, Kenora District)
- Hall Lake (Cochrane District)
- Hall Lake (Sudbury District)
- Hall Lake (Seal Lake, Kenora District)
- Hall Lake (York Region)
- Hall Lake (Dwight Lake, Thunder Bay District)
- Halleck Lake
- Haller Lake
- Halliday Lake (Thunder Bay District)
- Halliday Lake (Rainy River District)
- Halliday Lake (Genier Township, Sudbury District)
- Halliday Lake (Sothman Township, Sudbury District)
- Hallot Lake
- Hallow Lake
- Halls Lake (Algonquin Highlands)
- Halls Lake (Highlands East)
- Halpin Lake
- Halsey Lake
- Halvorsen Lake
- Ham Lake (Parry Sound District)
- Ham Lake (Thunder Bay District)
- Ham Lake (Sudbury District)
- Ham Lake (Kenora District)
- Hamanegg Lake
- Hambleton Lake
- Hambly Lake
- Hambone Lake (Sudbury District)
- Hambone Lake (Nipissing District)
- Hambrooke Lake
- Hamburg Lake
- Hamer Lake
- Hamilton Lake (Sudbury District)
- Hamilton Lake (Thunder Bay District)
- Hamilton Lake (Hastings County)
- Hamilton Lake (Squeedunk Creek, Kenora District)
- Hamilton Lake (Sioux Lookout)
- Hamilton Lake (Poplar River, Kenora District)
- Hamilton Lake (Frontenac County)
- Hamilton Lake (Parry Sound District)
- Hamlin Lake
- Hamlow Lake
- Hamlyn Lake
- Hamm Lake
- Hammell Lake (Parry Sound District)
- Hammell Lake (Nipissing District)
- Hammell Lake (Kenora District)
- Hammend Lake
- Hammer Lake (Alanen Township, Algoma District)
- Hammer Lake (Timiskaming District)
- Hammer Lake (Piche Township, Algoma District)
- Hammerhead Lake
- Hammerhetas Lake
- Hammerton Lake
- Hammond Lake (Parry Sound District)
- Hammond Lake (Sudbury District)
- Hammy Lake
- Hampel Lake
- Hamper Lake
- Hampton Lake

== Han ==
- Hancock Lake
- Hand Lake (Kenora District)
- Hand Lake (Algoma District)
- Hand Lake (Nipissing District)
- Handclasp Lake
- Handcuff Lake
- Handel Lake
- Handkes Lake
- Handle Lake (Rainy River District)
- Handle Lake (Thunder Bay District)
- Handley Lake
- Handy Lake
- Hanes Lake (Nipissing District)
- Hanes Lake (Algoma District)
- Hangingstone Lake
- Hangstone Lake
- Hanlan Lake (Cochrane District)
- Hanlan Lake (Renfrew County)
- Hanmer Lake
- Hanna Lake
- Hannah Lake (Greater Sudbury)
- Hannah Lake (Sudbury District)
- Hannah Lake (Frontenac County)
- Hannah Lake (Kenora District)
- Hannay Lake
- Hanover Lake (Thunder Bay District)
- Hanover Lake (Sudbury District)
- Hanrahan Lake (Thunder Bay District)
- Hanrahan Lake (Sudbury District)
- Hans Lake (Jocelyn)
- Hans Lake (Haig Township, Algoma District)
- Hansa Lake
- Hansen Lake (Sudbury District)
- Hansen Lake (Nipissing District)
- Hansen Lake (Kenora District)
- Hansford Lake
- Hansi Lake
- Hanson Lake (Sudbury District)
- Hanson Lake (Timiskaming District)
- Hanson Lake (Thunder Bay District)
- Hanstead Lake
- Hanton Lake
- Hanwood Lake

== Hap–Haz ==
- Hap Lake
- Happy Isle Lake
- Happy's Lake
- Harburn Lake
- Harcourt Lake
- Hard-dog Lake
- Harder Lake
- Hardiman Lake
- Harding Lake (Mekenak Creek, Kenora District)
- Harding Lake (Lanark County)
- Harding Lake (Dowling River, Kenora District)
- Hardings Lake
- Hardtack Lake (Nipissing District)
- Hardtack Lake (Rainy River District)
- Hardtime Lake
- Hardup Lake
- Hardwicke Lake
- Lake Hardwood
- Hardwood Lake (Greater Madawaska)
- Hardwood Lake (Hastings County)
- Hardwood Lake (Frontenac County)
- Hardwood Lake (Brudenell, Lyndoch and Raglan)
- Hardwood Lake (Sudbury District)
- Hardwood Lake (Temagami)
- Hardwood Lake (Stratton Township, Nipissing District)
- Hardy Lake (Muskoka District)
- Hardy Lake (Algoma District)
- Hare Lake (Algoma District)
- Hare Lake (Nipissing District)
- Hare Lake (Timiskaming District)
- Hare Lake (Thunder Bay District)
- Harebell Lake
- Harewood Lake
- Harfitt Lake
- Hargraft Lake
- Harju Lake
- Harju's Lake
- Harker Lake
- Harkness Lake
- Harland Lake
- Harling Lake
- Harmon Lake
- Harnden Lake
- Harness Lake (Nipissing District)
- Harness Lake (Kenora District)
- Harnett Lake
- Harney Lake
- Harold Lake (Rainy River District)
- Harold Lake (Thunder Bay District)
- Harold Lake (Algoma District)
- Harold Lake (Sudbury District)
- Harp Lake (Muskoka District)
- Harp Lake (Thunder Bay District)
- Harper Lake (Hastings County)
- Harper Lake (Rottenfish River, Kenora District)
- Harper Lake (Upper Manitou Lake, Kenora District)
- Harrell Lake
- Harriet Lake (Thunder Bay District)
- Harriet Lake (Cochrane District)
- Harriets Lake
- Harrington Lake
- Harris Lake (McDougall)
- Harris Lake (Kenora District)
- Harris Lake (Boucher Township, Thunder Bay District)
- Harris Lake (Dorion)
- Harris Lake (Cochrane District)
- Harris Lake (Wallbridge Township, Parry Sound District)
- Harris Lake (Timiskaming District)
- Harrison Lake (Kenora District)
- Harrison Lake (Grey County)
- Harrison Lake (Sudbury District)
- Harrison Lake (Thunder Bay District)
- Harrison Lake (Parry Sound District)
- Harrogate Lake
- Harrow Lake
- Harry Lake (Algoma District)
- Harry Lake (Killarney)
- Harry Lake (Whigham Township, Sudbury District)
- Harry Lake (Thunder Bay District)
- Harry Lake (Haliburton County)
- Harry May Lake
- Harrys Lake
- Hart Lake (Parry Sound District)
- Hart Lake (Macdonald, Meredith and Aberdeen Additional)
- Hart Lake (Frontenac County)
- Hart Lake (Thunder Bay District)
- Hart Lake (Sudbury District)
- Hart Lake (Cochrane District)
- Hart Lake (Haig Township, Algoma District)
- Hart Lake (Muskoka District)
- Harten Lake
- Hartle Lake
- Hartley Lake (Nipissing District)
- Hartley Lake (Killraine Township, Thunder Bay District)
- Hartley Lake (Boobus Lake, Thunder Bay District)
- Hartley Lake (Le Faive Lake, Thunder Bay District)
- Hartman Lake (Sudbury District)
- Hartman Lake (Kenora District)
- Harts Lake (Lanark County)
- Harts Lake (Kenora District)
- Hartshorn Lake
- Harttung Lake
- Hartwick Lake (Renfrew County)
- Hartwick Lake (Kenora District)
- Harvais Lake
- Harves Lake
- Harvey Lake (Gundy Township, Kenora District)
- Harvey Lake (Renfrew County)
- Harvey Lake (Dusey River, Thunder Bay District)
- Harvey Lake (Shiny Creek, Kenora District)
- Harvey Lake (Sudbury District)
- Harvey Lake (Mattice Lake, Thunder Bay District)
- Harvey Lake (Rainy River District)
- Harvey Lake (Algoma District)
- Harvey Lake (Haliburton County)
- Harvey's Shanty Lake
- Harvie Lake (Thunder Bay District)
- Harvie Lake (Sudbury District)
- Hashie Lake
- Haskett Lake
- Haskins Lake (Nipissing District)
- Haskins Lake (Cochrane District)
- Hassard Lake (Sudbury District)
- Hassard Lake (Parry Sound District)
- Hassett Lake
- Hasson Lake
- Hastie Lake
- Hat Lake (Kenora District)
- Hat Lake (Algoma District)
- Hatch Lake (Kenora District)
- Hatch Lake (Parry Sound District)
- Hatchet Lake (Cochrane District)
- Hatchet Lake (Mulcahy Township, Kenora District)
- Hatchet Lake (Algoma District)
- Hatchet Lake (Sioux Narrows-Nestor Falls)
- Hatley Lake
- Hatmaker Lake
- Hattatt Lake
- Hauenstein Lake
- Haultain Lake (Cochrane District)
- Haultain Lake (Timiskaming District)
- Hausen Lake
- Lac Hauteville
- Havelock Lake
- Haven Lake
- Haversack Lake
- Havik Lake
- Havilah Lake
- Havilland Lake
- Havoc Lake
- Haw Lake
- Hawaiian Lake
- Hawe Lake
- Hawk Lake (Cochrane District)
- Hawk Lake (Thunder Bay District)
- Hawk Lake (Hastings County)
- Hawk Lake (Tupper Township, Algoma District)
- Hawk Lake (Namaygoos Lake, Kenora District)
- Hawk Lake (Desmond Township, Kenora District)
- Hawk Lake (Esquega Township, Algoma District)
- Hawkcliff Lake
- Hawke Lake
- Hawkes Lake
- Hawkeye Lake
- Hawkins Lake (Algoma District)
- Hawkins Lake (Nipissing District)
- Hawkins Lake (Thunder Bay District)
- Hawknest Lake
- Hawkshaw Lake
- Hawley Lake (Kenora District)
- Hawley Lake (Timiskaming District)
- Hawn Lake
- Hay Lake (Cochrane District)
- Hay Lake (Algoma District)
- Hay Lake (Kenora District)
- Hay Lake (Sudbury District)
- Hay Lake (Thunder Bay District)
- Hay Lake (South Algonquin)
- Hay Lake (Temagami)
- Haycock Lake
- Hayes Lake (Algoma District)
- Hayes Lake (Nipissing District)
- Hayes Lake (Thunder Bay District)
- Hayes Lake (Bruce County)
- Haynes Lake
- Hayon Lake
- Hays Lake
- Hayton Lake
- Hayward Lake (Thunder Bay District)
- Hayward Lake (Kenora District)
- Haze Lake (Algoma District)
- Haze Lake (Thunder Bay District)
- Hazel Lake (GTP Block 4 Township, Thunder Bay District)
- Hazel Lake (McGillis Township, Thunder Bay District)
- Hazel Lake (Parry Sound District)
- Hazel Lake (Cochrane District)
- Hazel Lake (Sudbury District)
- Hazel Lake (Algoma District)
- Hazell Lake
- Hazelwood Lake
- Hazen Lake
- Hazzard Lake

== He–Hem ==
- He Lake
- Head Lake (Null Lake, Thunder Bay District)
- Head Lake (Haliburton County)
- Head Lake (Timiskaming District)
- Head Lake (Nipissing District)
- Head Lake (Jean Township, Thunder Bay District
- Head Lake (Renfrew County)
- Head Lake (Kawartha Lakes)
- Headquarters Lake (Parry Sound District)
- Headquarters Lake (Sudbury District)
- Headstone Lake
- Headwater Lake
- Heafur Lake
- Heal Lake
- Heald Lake
- Healey Lake (Parry Sound District)
- Healey Lake (Thunder Bay District)
- Healey Lake (Muskoka District)
- Hearld Lake
- Hearsey Lake
- Hearst Lake (Thunder Bay District)
- Hearst Lake (Timiskaming District)
- Heart Lake (Algoma District)
- Heart Lake (Carew Township, Sudbury District)
- Heart Lake (Frontenac County)
- Heart Lake (Little Turtle River, Kenora District)
- Heart Lake (Timiskaming District)
- Heart Lake (Sheraton Township, Cochrane District)
- Heart Lake (Renfrew County)
- Heart Lake (Timmins)
- Heart Lake (Thunder Bay District)
- Heart Lake (Foleyet Township, Sudbury District)
- Heart Lake (Peel Region)
- Heart Lake (Pelican Township, Kenora District)
- Heaslip Lake
- Heath Lake (Lennox and Addington County)
- Heath Lake (Cochrane District)
- Heathcote Lake
- Heather Lake (Sudbury District)
- Heather Lake (Misehkow River, Thunder Bay District)
- Heather Lake (Terrace Bay)
- Heather Lake (Timiskaming District)
- Heathwalt Lake
- Heaton Lake
- Heaven Lake
- Hebden Lake
- Hebert Lake
- Hebner Lake
- Heck Lake
- Hector Lake (Algoma District)
- Hector Lake (Cochrane District)
- Hector Lake (Lawrence Lake, Kenora District)
- Hector Lake (Wabassi River, Kenora District)
- Hectorine Lake
- Hedera Lake
- Heenan Lake
- Hefferman Lake
- Hefford Lake
- Heiderman Lake
- Heidermans Lake
- Heifer Lake
- Height of Land Lake
- Heinrich Lake
- Heinselman Lake
- Heinz Lake
- Heise Lake
- Helder Lake
- Helen Lake (Sibley Township, Thunder Bay District)
- Helen Lake (Somme Township, Sudbury District)
- Helen Lake (Gidley Township, Kenora District)
- Helen Lake (Noonan Lake, Kenora District)
- Helen Lake (Roosevelt Township, Sudbury District)
- Helen Lake (Algoma District)
- Helen Lake (Beaumont Township, Sudbury District)
- Helen Lake (Ceylon Township, Sudbury District)
- Helen Lake (Nipigon)
- Helen Lillie Lake
- Helena Lake
- Helenbar Lake
- Helianthus Lake
- Helicopter Lake
- Helios Lake
- Hellangone Lake
- Hellard Lake
- Hello Lake
- Hellsten Lake
- Hellyer Lake
- Helm Lake
- Helmer Lake
- Helmet Lake
- Helve Lake
- Hematite Lake
- Hemlock Lake (Nipigon District)
- Hemlock Lake (Manitoulin District)
- Hemlock Lake (Peterborough County)
- Hemlock Lake (Renfrew County)
- Hemlock Lake (South Frontenac)
- Hemlock Lake (North Frontenac)

== Hen–Hey ==
- Hen Lake
- Henderson Lake (Sudbury District)
- Henderson Lake (Hastings County)
- Henderson Lake (Timiskaming District)
- Henderson Lake (GTP Block 2 Township, Thunder Bay District)
- Henderson Lake (Schmoo Lake, Thunder Bay District)
- Henderson Lake (Bell Township, Thunder Bay District)
- Hendersons Lake
- Hendrick Lake
- Hendrickson Lake
- Hendrie Lake
- Hendry Lake
- Heney Lake
- Henfrey Lake
- Henhawk Lake
- Henna Lake
- Hennessy Lake (Sudbury District)
- Hennessy Lake (Cochrane District)
- Henrick Lake
- Henrietta Lake
- Lake Henry
- Henry Lake (Parry Sound District)
- Henry Lake (Sudbury District)
- Henry Lake (Algoma District)
- Henshaw Lake
- Henwood Lake
- Hepburn Lake (Sudbury District)
- Hepburn Lake (Cochrane District)
- Herb Lake (Jackman Township, Kenora District)
- Herb Lake (Haliburton County)
- Herb Lake (Walt Lake, Kenora District)
- Herbage Lake
- Herbert Lake (Algoma District)
- Herbert Lake (Thunder Bay District)
- Herbert Lake (Nipissing District)
- Herdman Lake
- Hergott Lake
- Herman Lake (Algoma District)
- Herman Lake (Cochrane District)
- Hermanson Lake
- Hermence Lake
- Hermia Lake
- Hermiston Lake
- Hermit Lake (Sudbury District)
- Hermit Lake (Timiskaming District)
- Hermit Lake (Nipissing District)
- Hermitage Lake
- Herod Lake
- Heron Lake (Rainy River District)
- Heron Lake (Nipissing District)
- Heron Lake (Timiskaming District)
- Heron Lake (Thunder Bay District)
- Heron Lake (Cochrane District)
- Heronry Lake
- Heronshaw Lake
- Herontrack Lake
- Herrick Lake (Algoma District)
- Herrick Lake (Thunder Bay District)
- Herridge Lake
- Herring Lake
- Herron Lake
- Hertz Lake
- Heslip Lake
- Hesman Lake
- Hesners Lake
- Hess Lake
- Hetton Lake
- Hettrick Lake
- Heuston Lake
- Hew Lake
- Heward Lake
- Hewitt Lake (Black River-Matheson)
- Hewitt Lake (Michaud Township, Cochrane District)
- Hewitt Lake (Kenora District)
- Hewson Lake
- Heyden Lake

== Hia–Hil ==
- Hiah Lake
- Hiawatha Lake (Nipissing District)
- Hiawatha Lake (Algoma District)
- Hibbert Lake
- Hickerson Lake
- Hickory Lake (Thunder Bay District)
- Hickory Lake (Muskoka District)
- Hicks Lake (Frontenac County)
- Hicks Lake (Thunder Bay District)
- Hicks Lake (Hastings County)
- Hicks Lake (Sudbury District)
- Hicks Lake (Parry Sound District)
- Hicky Lake
- Hidden Lake (Eldridge Township, Nipissing District)
- Hidden Lake (Redditt Township, Kenora District)
- Hidden Lake (Timiskaming District)
- Hidden Lake (Hastings County)
- Hidden Lake (Rainy River District)
- Hidden Lake (Sioux Lookout)
- Hidden Lake (Algoma District)
- Hidden Lake (Cochrane District)
- Hidden Lake (Parkman Township, Nipissing District)
- Hidden Lake (Big Sand Lake, Kenora District)
- Hidden Lake (Clancy Township, Nipissing District)
- Hidden Lake (Frontenac County)
- Hideaway Lake (Kenora District)
- Hideaway Lake (Thunder Bay District)
- Hideaway Lake (Sudbury District)
- Hider Lake
- Hiewall Lake
- Higbee Lake
- Higgins Lake
- High Cliff Lake
- High Dam Lake
- High Dump Lake
- High Falls Lake
- High Lake (Jackman Township, Kenora District)
- High Lake (Whitman Township, Algoma District)
- High Lake (Red Lake)
- High Lake (Winnipeg River, Kenora District)
- High Lake (Ewart Township, Kenora District)
- High Lake (Dolson Township, Algoma District)
- High Lake (Muskoka District)
- High Lake (Bayfield Township, Algoma District)
- High Lake (Rainy River District)
- High Lake (Sudbury District)
- High Lake (Thunder Bay District)
- High Lake (Scarfe Township, Algoma District)
- High Lake (Greater Sudbury)
- Highball Lake
- Highbank Lake
- Highbluff Lake
- Highbrush Lake
- Highcliff Lake
- Higher Lake
- Highfalls Lake
- Highland Lake (Highland Creek, Rainy River District)
- Highland Lake (Algoma District)
- Highland Lake (Renfrew County)
- Highland Lake (Atikokan)
- Highrock Lake (Kenora District)
- Highrock Lake (Parry Sound District)
- Highspot Lake
- Highstone Lake
- Hightop Lake
- Highview Lake
- Highwater Lake
- Highwind Lake
- Higley Lake
- Hik Lake
- Hike Lake
- Hilda Lake
- Hilder Lake
- Hildreth Lake (Thunder Bay District)
- Hildreth Lake (Timiskaming District)
- Hill Lake (South Frontenac)
- Hill Lake (North Frontenac)
- Hill Lake (Timiskaming District)
- Hill Lake (Rowan Lake, Kenora District)
- Hill Lake (Sudbury District)
- Hill Lake (Otay Lake, Kenora District)
- Hill Lake (Thunder Bay District)
- Hill's Lake
- Hillary Lake
- Hillbrow Lake
- Hillcrest Lake (Anglin Township, Nipissing District)
- Hillcrest Lake (Temagami)
- Hiller Lake
- Hilliard Lake (Algoma District)
- Hilliard Lake (Nipissing District)
- Hillman Lake (Thunder Bay District)
- Hillman Lake (Muskoka District)
- Hillmer Lake
- Hillock Lake
- Lake of the Hills (Lanark County)
- Lake of the Hills (Renfrew County)
- Hills Lake
- Hillside Lake (Thunder Bay District)
- Hillside Lake (Nipissing District)
- Hillside Lake (Waterloo Region)
- Hillsport Lake
- Hilltop Lake (Thunder Bay District)
- Hilltop Lake (Algoma District)
- Hilltop Lake (Sudbury District)
- Hilly Lake (Nipissing District)
- Hilly Lake (Kenora District)
- Hilma Lake
- Hilton Lake
- Hilyard Lake

== Him–Hix ==
- Himbury Lake
- Himdick Lake
- Hinchcliffe Lake
- Hinckler Lake
- Hincks Lake
- Hindon Lake
- Hindson Lake
- Hine Lake
- Hines Lake (Grey County)
- Hines Lake (Timiskaming District)
- Hines Lake (Parry Sound District)
- Hinge Lake
- Hinsburger Lake
- Hinterland Lake (Haliburton County)
- Hinterland Lake (Kenora District)
- Hinton Lake (Kenora District)
- Hinton Lake (Sudbury District)
- Hinz Lake
- Hion Lake
- Hipel Lake
- Hiram Lake
- Hischuck Lake
- Hisson Lake
- History Lake
- Hitch Lake (Algoma District)
- Hitch Lake (Thunder Bay District)
- Hives Lake
- Hixon Lake

== Hoa–Hom ==
- Hoard Lake
- Hoare Lake (Hastings County)
- Hoare Lake (Rainy River District)
- Hoath Lake
- Hoba Lake
- Hobart Lake
- Hobbs Lake
- Hoben Lake
- Hobo Lake
- Hobon Lake
- Hobson Lake
- Hock Lake
- Hodge Lake
- Hodgins Lake (South Bruce Peninsula)
- Hodgins Lake (Huron-Kinloss)
- Hodgins Lake (Kenora District)
- Hodgson Lake (Kenora District)
- Hodgson Lake (Algoma District)
- Hoey Lake (Sudbury District)
- Hoey Lake (Rainy River District)
- Hoffman Lake
- Hofstetter Lake
- Hog Lake (Manitoulin District)
- Hog Lake (Parry Sound District)
- Hogan Lake (Renfrew County)
- Hogan Lake (Sudbury District)
- Hogan Lake (Frontenac County)
- Hogan Lake (Thunder Bay District)
- Hogan Lake (Nipissing District)
- Hogan Lake (Parry Sound District)
- Hogan's Lake
- Hogarth Lake
- Hogg Lake
- Hoggard Lake
- Hogsback Lake (Nipissing District)
- Hogsback Lake (Sudbury District)
- Hoiles Lake
- Hoist Lake
- Holbrooke Lake
- Holcroft Lake
- Holden Lake (Timiskaming District)
- Holden Lake (Cochrane District)
- Holden Lake (Renfrew County)
- Holdridge Lake
- Holdsworth Lake
- Holger Lake (McMeekin Township, Kenora District)
- Holger Lake (Holger Creek, Kenora District)
- Holinshead Lake
- Holland Lake (Haliburton County)
- Holland Lake (Timiskaming District)
- Holland Lake (Cochrane District)
- Holland Lake (Kenora District)
- Holland Lake (Hastings County)
- Holland Lake (Thunder Bay District)
- Hollands Lake
- Holleford Lake
- Holliday Lake
- Hollinger Lake (Lanark County)
- Hollinger Lake (Thunder Bay District)
- Hollinger Lake (Timiskaming District)
- Hollingsworth Lake
- Hollow Cedar Lake
- Hollow Lake (Sudbury District)
- Hollow Lake (Kenora District)
- Holloway Lake
- Hollowrock Lake
- Holly Lake
- Holm Lake
- Holmes Lake (Lennox and Addington County)
- Holmes Lake (Algoma District)
- Holmes Lake (Cochrane District)
- Holmes Lake (Timiskaming District)
- Holmes Lake (Rainy River District)
- Holmes Lake (Kenora District)
- Holmes Lake (Renfrew County)
- Holmstrom Lake
- Holness Lake
- Holstein Lake
- Holster Lake
- Holstrom Lake
- Holt Lake (Thunder Bay District)
- Holt Lake (Timiskaming District)
- Home Lake (Camp Lake, Thunder Bay District)
- Home Lake (Wye Lake, Thunder Bay District)
- Home Lake (Parry Sound District)
- Homer Lake (Kenora District)
- Homer Lake (Cochrane District)
- Homestead Lake
- Homuth Lake

== Hon–How ==
- Honderich Lake
- Hone Lake
- Honest Lake
- Honey Lake (Algoma District)
- Honey Lake (Cochrane District)
- Honey Lake (Sudbury District)
- Honeymoon Lake
- Honeywell Lake
- Hong Lake
- Honour Lake
- Hooch Lake
- Hood Lake (Grayson Lake, Thunder Bay District)
- Hood Lake (Sudbury District)
- Hood Lake (Deatys Creek, Thunder Bay District)
- Hood Lake (Nipissing District)
- Hoodoo Lake (Keith Township, Sudbury District)
- Hoodoo Lake (Engstrom Township, Sudbury District)
- Hoof Lake (Thunder Bay District)
- Hoof Lake (Cochrane District)
- Hook Lake (St. Ignace Island)
- Hook Lake (Tremble Lake, Kenora District)
- Hook Lake (Laughren Township, Algoma District)
- Hook Lake (Cawing Lake, Kenora District)
- Hook Lake (Haliburton County)
- Hook Lake (Sioux Narrows-Nestor Falls)
- Hook Lake (Hook Creek, Kenora District)
- Hook Lake (Sudbury District)
- Hook Lake (Frank Lake, Thunder Bay District)
- Hook Lake (Pickle Lake)
- Hook Lake (McEwing Township, Algoma District)
- Hook Lake (Nipissing District)
- Hookah Lake
- Hooker Lake
- Hoolihan Lake
- Hoot Lake
- Hooton Lake
- Hoover Lake (Hastings County)
- Hoover Lake (Algoma District)
- Hoover Lake (Timiskaming District)
- Hop Lake
- Lake Hope (Rainy River District)
- Lake Hope (Algoma District)
- Hope Lake (Thunder Bay District)
- Hope Lake (Sudbury District)
- Hope Lake (Nordica Township, Timiskaming District)
- Hope Lake (Nipissing District)
- Hope Lake (Tudhope Township, Timiskaming District)
- Hope Lake (Cochrane District)
- Hope Lake (Kenora District)
- Hope Lake (Algoma District)
- Hopian Lake
- Hopkins Lake (Lennox and Addington County)
- Hopkins Lake (Kenora District)
- Hopkins Lake (Timiskaming District)
- Hopkins Lake (Cochrane District)
- Hopley Lake
- Hopper Lake
- Hoppy Lake
- Hopwood Lake
- Horace Cove Lake
- Hore Lake
- Horgon Lake
- Horley Lake
- Horlock Lake
- Horn Lake (Magnetawan)
- Horn Lake (McMurrich/Monteith)
- Horn Lake (Algoma District)
- Horn Lake (Kawartha Lakes)
- Horn Lake (Kenora District)
- Horn Lake (Cochrane District)
- Hornbeam Lake
- Hornberg Lake
- Hornblende Lake
- Hornblendite Lake
- Hornby Lake (Cochrane District)
- Hornby Lake (Kenora District)
- Horne Lake (Thunder Bay District)
- Horne Lake (Elliot Lake)
- Horne Lake (Kenora District)
- Horne Lake (Lanark County)
- Horne Lake (Desbiens Township, Algoma District)
- Hornell Lake (Tustin Township, Kenora District)
- Hornell Lake (Warrington River, Kenora District)
- Horner Lake
- Hornes Lake
- Hornet Lake (Sudbury District)
- Hornet Lake (Nipissing District)
- Hornet Lake (Algoma District)
- Hornet Lake (Thunder Bay District)
- Hornick Lake
- Horning Lake
- Horrell Lake
- Horse Lake (Peterborough County)
- Horse Lake (Bruce County)
- Horse Lake (Ladysmith Creek, Kenora District)
- Horse Lake (Hastings County)
- Horse Lake (Walk Lake, Kenora District)
- Horse Lake (Muskoka District)
- Horsehead Lake (Mikano Township, Thunder Bay District)
- Horsehead Lake (Coltham Township, Thunder Bay District)
- Horseshoe Lake (Flanders River, Thunder Bay District)
- Horseshoe Lake (Deagle Township, Algoma District)
- Horseshoe Lake (Grenoble Township, Algoma District)
- Horseshoe Lake (Shrub Creek, Kenora District)
- Horseshoe Lake (Peterborough County)
- Horseshoe Lake (D'Avaugour Township, Sudbury District)
- Horseshoe Lake (Massey Township, Cochrane District)
- Horseshoe Lake (Pipestone River, Kenora District)
- Horseshoe Lake (The Archipelago)
- Horseshoe Lake (Thunder Bay)
- Horseshoe Lake (Renwick Township, Algoma District)
- Horseshoe Lake (Seguin)
- Horseshoe Lake (South Frontenac)
- Horseshoe Lake (Swartman Township, Cochrane District)
- Horseshoe Lake (Colquhoun Township, Cochrane District)
- Horseshoe Lake (Ellis Township, Sudbury District)
- Horseshoe Lake (Renfrew County)
- Horseshoe Lake (Nipissing District)
- Horseshoe Lake (Regan Township, Sudbury District)
- Horseshoe Lake (Mongowin Township, Sudbury District)
- Horseshoe Lake (Hastings County)
- Horseshoe Lake (Truman Township, Sudbury District)
- Horseshoe Lake (Rainy River District)
- Horseshoe Lake (Iroquois Falls)
- Horseshoe Lake (Highlands East)
- Horseshoe Lake (Simcoe County)
- Horseshoe Lake (Timmins)
- Horseshoe Lake (Central Frontenac)
- Horseshoe Lake (Minden Hills)
- Horseshoe Lake (Greater Sudbury)
- Horseshoe Lake (Popeye Lake, Kenora District)
- Horseshoe Lake (Begin Township, Thunder Bay District)
- Horseshoe Lake (Lennox and Addington County)
- Horseshoe Lake (Secord Township, Sudbury District)
- Horsetail Lake
- Horsey Lake
- Hortense Lake
- Horton Lake (Renfrew County)
- Horton Lake (Frontenac County)
- Horvath Lake (Sudbury District)
- Horvath Lake (Kenora District)
- Horwood Lake
- Hosea Lake
- Hosick Lake
- Hosiery Lake
- Hosking Lake
- Hosmer Lake
- Hospital Lake (Algoma District)
- Hospital Lake (Kenora District)
- Hot Lake
- Hotchkin Lake
- Hotshot Lake
- Hotspot Lake
- Hotstone Lake
- Houck Lake
- Hough Lake (Timiskaming District)
- Hough Lake (Thunder Bay District)
- Hough Lake (Algoma District)
- Houghton Lake (Nipissing District)
- Houghton Lake (Sudbury District)
- Houghton Lake (Thunder Bay District)
- Hound Chute Lake
- Hound Lake (Hastings County)
- Hound Lake (Algoma District)
- Hourglass Lake (Algoma District)
- Hourglass Lake (Kenora District)
- Hourglass Lake (Thunder Bay District)
- House Lake (Timiskaming District)
- House Lake (Sudbury District)
- Houston Lake (Greater Sudbury)
- Houston Lake (Sudbury District)
- Howard Lake (Algoma District)
- Howard Lake (Timiskaming District)
- Howard Lake (Leeds and Grenville United Counties)
- Howard Lake (Zizania Creek, Kenora District)
- Howard Lake (Silver Lake, Kenora District)
- Howard Lake (Thunder Bay District)
- Howcum Lake
- Howe's Lake
- Howells Lake (Cochrane District)
- Howells Lake (Kenora District)
- Howes Lake
- Howie Lake
- Howland Lake (Haliburton County)
- Howland Lake (Algoma District)
- Howlett Lake
- Howling Wolf Lake
- Howry Lake

== Hua–Hum ==
- Huard Lake
- Hub Lake (Thunder Bay District)
- Hub Lake (Algoma District)
- Hubbard Lake
- Hubert Lake (Algoma District)
- Hubert Lake (Timiskaming District)
- Huck Lake
- Huckell Lake
- Hucker Lake
- Huckleberry Lake
- Huckson Lake
- Hudson Lake
- Huey Lake
- Huff Lake (Nipissing District)
- Huff Lake (Sudbury District)
- Huff Lake (Algoma District)
- Huffman Lake
- Huge Lake
- Hugh Lake
- Hughes Lake (Thunder Bay District)
- Hughes Lake (Timmins)
- Hughes Lake (Hastings County)
- Hughes Lake (Swartman Township, Cochrane District)
- Hughes Lake (Lennox and Addington County)
- Hughes Lake (Parry Sound District)
- Hughes Lake (Renfrew County)
- Hughes Lake (Kenora District)
- Hugli Lake
- Huke Lake
- Hull Lake (Thunder Bay District)
- Hull Lake (Cochrane District)
- Hulse Lake
- Humberstone Lake
- Humestone Lake
- Hump Lake (Kenora District)
- Hump Lake (Thunder Bay District)
- Humphrey Lake

== Hun–Hur ==
- Lake Hunger
- Hungry Lake (North Frontenac)
- Hungry Lake (Parry Sound District)
- Hungry Lake (Central Frontenac)
- Hunkin Lake
- Hunking Lake
- Hunt Lake (Timiskaming District)
- Hunt Lake (Thunder Bay District)
- Hunter Lake (Rainy River District)
- Hunter Lake (Killarney)
- Hunter Lake (Nipissing District)
- Hunter Lake (Porter Township, Sudbury District)
- Hunter's Lake
- Hunting Lake
- Hunts Lake
- Huntsville Lake
- Hurd Lake (Sudbury District)
- Hurd Lake (Thunder Bay District)
- Hurd Lake (Cochrane District)
- Hurdman Lake (Nipissing District)
- Hurdman Lake (Cochrane District)
- Hurds Lake
- Hurl Lake
- Hurlburt Lake
- Hurlock Lake
- Hurn Lake
- Lake Huron
- Huronian Lake
- Hurricane Lake
- Hurst Lake (Haliburton County)
- Hurst Lake (Thunder Bay District)
- Hurst Lake (Parry Sound District)

== Hus–Hut ==
- Husak Lake
- Husband Lake
- Hush Hush Lake
- Husky Lake
- Huston Lake (Kenora District)
- Huston Lake (Algoma District)
- Hut Lake
- Hutal Lake
- Hutch Lake (Kenora District)
- Hutch Lake (Cochrane District)
- Hutcheson Lake
- Hutchins Lake (Rainy River District)
- Hutchins Lake (Kenora District)
- Hutchison Lake
- Hutnick Lake
- Hutson Lake
- Hutt Lake (Kenora District)
- Hutt Lake (Sudbury District)
- Hutton Lake (Sudbury District)
- Hutton Lake (Rainy River District)

== Hy ==
- Hyatt Lake
- Hybla Lake
- Hybrid Lake (Nipissing District)
- Hybrid Lake (Sudbury District)
- Hydes Lake
- Hydro Lake (Cochrane District)
- Hydro Lake (Thunder Bay District)
- Hydro Lake (Timiskaming District)
- Hydro Lake (Kenora District)
- Hyland Lake
- Hylo Lake
- Hyndman Lake
- Hyne Lake
- Hynes Lake
- Hynrick Lake
- Hyslop Lake
- Hyt Lake
