= Honeymoon Lake =

Honeymoon Lake may refer to:

- Honeymoon Lake, near Bear Claw Spire in California
- Honeymoon Lake, in Sanders County, Montana
- Honeymoon Lake, in Wayne County, Utah
- Honeymoon Lake, in the Nahanni National Park Reserve, Northwest Territories
- Honeymoon Lake, in Timiskaming District, Ontario

== See also ==
- Honeymoon Bay (disambiguation)
- Moon Lake (disambiguation)
