= Telescope Lake =

- Location in Ontario
- Location: Kenora District, Ontario
- Coordinates: 50°55′49″N 94°24′47″W
- Type: lake
- Part of: Hudson Bay drainage basin
- River sources: Rostoul River
- Primary outflows: Rostoul River
- Basin countries: Canada
- Max. length: 8.8 km (5.5 mi)
- Max. width: 1.5 km (0.93 mi)
- Surface elevation: 375 m (1,230 ft)

Telescope Lake is a lake in the Unorganized Part of Kenora District in Northwestern Ontario, Canada. It is in the Hudson Bay drainage basin, and is within Woodland Caribou Provincial Park.

The primary inflow, at the north and arriving from Embryo Lake, and outflow, at the west and leading towards Optic Lake, is the Rostoul River, which flows via the Gammon River, the Bloodvein River, Lake Winnipeg, and the Nelson River to Hudson Bay.

== See also ==
- List of lakes in Ontario
