= Gammon Lake =

- Location in Ontario
- Location: Kenora District, Ontario
- Coordinates: 51°00′57″N 94°44′02″W
- Type: lake
- Part of: Hudson Bay drainage basin
- Primary outflows: Gammon River
- Basin countries: Canada
- Max. length: 12 km (7.5 mi)
- Max. width: 4 km (2.5 mi)
- Surface elevation: 356 m (1,168 ft)

Gammon Lake is a lake in the Unorganized Part of Kenora District in Northwestern Ontario, Canada. It is in the Hudson Bay drainage basin, is within Woodland Caribou Provincial Park, and is the source of the Gammon River.

There are numerous unnamed inflows. The primary outflow, at the southwest and leading to Hammerhead Lake, is the Gammon River, which flows via the Bloodvein River, Lake Winnipeg, and the Nelson River to Hudson Bay.

== See also ==
- List of lakes in Ontario
