= Bear claw (disambiguation) =

A bear claw is a type of pastry.

Bear claw or bear claws may also refer to:

- The claw of a bear
- Bear claw, a style of winter boot sold at such retailers as Sam's Club
- Bear Claw Casino & Hotel, near Carlyle, Saskatchewan, Canada
- Bear Claw Nebula, an emission nebula and star-forming region
- Bear Claw Spire, a mountain in California, USA
- "Bear Claws," a 2017 single by The Academic
- Berenklauw, a fried Dutch snack
- Bear claw or bear's claw quilt block, see List of notable North American quilt-block patterns
