= Haggart River =

- Location of the mouth of the river in Ontario

Location
- Country: Canada
- Province: Ontario
- Region: Northwestern Ontario
- District: Kenora
- Part: Unorganized Kenora District

Physical characteristics
- Source: Unnamed creek
  - coordinates: 50°46′48″N 94°55′15″W
  - elevation: 357 m (1,171 ft)
- Mouth: Carroll Lake
  - coordinates: 51°04′13″N 95°01′04″W
  - elevation: 325 m (1,066 ft)

Basin features
- River system: Hudson Bay drainage basin

The Haggart River is a river in the Unorganized Part of Kenora District in Northwestern Ontario, Canada. It is in the Hudson Bay drainage basin and is a left tributary of the Gammon River. The river is within Woodland Caribou Provincial Park.

== Course ==
The river begins at the outflow from an unnamed creek and flows north through a series of unnamed lakes before reaching the southern tip of Haggart Lake. It continues north into Bulging Lake, then through a series of unnamed lakes, and reaches its mouth at Carroll Lake on the Gammon River. The Gammon River flows via the Bloodvein River, Lake Winnipeg, and the Nelson River to Hudson Bay.
