= Hansen Lake =

Hansen Lake may refer to:

- Hansen Lake (Arkansas); see List of lakes in Saline County, Arkansas
- Hansen Lake (Kenora District), a lake in Kenora District, Ontario, Canada
- Hansen Lake (Nipissing District), a lake in Nipissing District, Ontario, Canada
- Hansen Lake (Sudbury District), a lake in Sudbury District, Ontario, Canada
