= Bloodvein =

Bloodvein or Blood-vein may refer to:

- Bloodvein River, a tributary of Lake Winnipeg in Ontario and Manitoba, Canada
- Bloodvein First Nation, located on the east side of Lake Winnipeg, along the Bloodvein River in Manitoba, Canada
- Bloodvein River Airport, located adjacent to Bloodvein River, Manitoba, Canada and serves the Bloodvein First Nation
- Blood-vein, a moth of the family Geometridae
