= Domain Creek =

- Location of the mouth of the creek in Ontario

Location
- Country: Canada
- Province: Ontario
- Region: Northwestern Ontario
- District: Kenora
- Part: Unorganized Kenora District

Physical characteristics
- Source: Domain Lake
  - coordinates: 50°56′23″N 94°38′31″W
  - elevation: 371 m (1,217 ft)
- Mouth: Hansen Lake
  - coordinates: 50°56′45″N 94°40′58″W
  - elevation: 345 m (1,132 ft)

Basin features
- River system: Hudson Bay drainage basin

Domain Creek is a stream in the Unorganized Part of Kenora District in Northwestern Ontario, Canada. It is in the Hudson Bay drainage basin, is a right tributary of the Rostoul River, and is within Woodland Caribou Provincial Park.

== Course ==
The creek begins at the west end of Domain Lake and flows west to its mouth at the northwest side of Hansen Lake on the Rostoul River. The Rostoul River flows via the Gammon River, the Bloodvein River, Lake Winnipeg, and the Nelson River to Hudson Bay.
