= Optic Lake (Ontario) =

- Location in Ontario
- Location: Kenora District, Ontario
- Coordinates: 50°55′17″N 94°31′16″W
- Type: lake
- Part of: Hudson Bay drainage basin
- River sources: Rostoul River
- Primary outflows: Rostoul River
- Basin countries: Canada
- Max. length: 4.0 km (2.5 mi)
- Max. width: 2.3 km (1.4 mi)
- Surface elevation: 365 m (1,198 ft)

Optic Lake is a lake in the Unorganized Part of Kenora District in Northwestern Ontario, Canada. It is in the Hudson Bay drainage basin, and is within Woodland Caribou Provincial Park.

The primary inflow, at the northeast and arriving from Telescope Lake, and outflow, at the west and leading towards Glenn Lake, is the Rostoul River, which flows via the Gammon River, the Bloodvein River, Lake Winnipeg, and the Nelson River to Hudson Bay.

== See also ==
- List of lakes in Ontario
