= Rostoul Lake =

- Location in Ontario
- Location: Kenora District, Ontario
- Coordinates: 50°57′20″N 94°46′06″W
- Type: lake
- Part of: Hudson Bay drainage basin
- River sources: Rostoul River
- Primary outflows: Rostoul River
- Basin countries: Canada
- Max. length: 6.9 km (4.3 mi)
- Max. width: 3.7 km (2.3 mi)
- Surface elevation: 337 m (1,106 ft)

Rostoul Lake is a lake in the Unorganized Part of Kenora District in Northwestern Ontario, Canada. It is in the Hudson Bay drainage basin, and is within Woodland Caribou Provincial Park.

The primary inflows are the Rostoul River, arriving at the southeast from Hansen Lake, and Haven Creek, arriving at the southwest from the direction of Haven Lake. The primary outflow, leaving at the northwest and leading towards Hammerhead Lake, is the Rostoul River, which flows via the Gammon River, the Bloodvein River, Lake Winnipeg, and the Nelson River to Hudson Bay.

== See also ==
- List of lakes in Ontario
