= Haven Lake (Ontario) =

- Location in Ontario
- Location: Kenora District, Ontario
- Coordinates: 50°54′52″N 94°48′59″W
- Type: lake
- Part of: Hudson Bay drainage basin
- River sources: Haven Creek
- Primary outflows: Haven Creek
- Basin countries: Canada
- Max. length: 4.0 km (2.5 mi)
- Max. width: 2.2 km (1.4 mi)
- Surface elevation: 365 m (1,198 ft)

Haven Lake is a lake in the Unorganized Part of Kenora District in Northwestern Ontario, Canada. It is in the Hudson Bay drainage basin, and is within Woodland Caribou Provincial Park.

The primary inflow, arriving at the south from an unnamed lake, and outflow, leaving at the northwest and leading towards Rostoul Lake, is Haven Creek, which flows via the Rostoul River, the Gammon River, the Bloodvein River, Lake Winnipeg, and the Nelson River to Hudson Bay.

== See also ==
- List of lakes in Ontario
