= Embryo Lake =

- Location in Ontario
- Location: Kenora District, Ontario
- Coordinates: 50°57′25″N 94°22′18″W
- Type: lake
- Part of: Hudson Bay drainage basin
- Primary outflows: Rostoul River
- Basin countries: Canada
- Max. length: 7.1 km (4.4 mi)
- Max. width: 1.8 km (1.1 mi)
- Surface elevation: 381 m (1,250 ft)

Embryo Lake is a lake in the Unorganized Part of Kenora District in Northwestern Ontario, Canada. It is in the Hudson Bay drainage basin, is within Woodland Caribou Provincial Park, and is the source of the Rostoul River.

There are three unnamed inflows at the northeast, northwest and west. The primary outflow, at the southwest and leading to Telescope Lake, is the Rostoul River, which flows via the Gammon River, the Bloodvein River, Lake Winnipeg, and the Nelson River to Hudson Bay.

== See also ==
- List of lakes in Ontario
