= Haggart Lake (Kenora District) =

- Location in Ontario
- Location: Kenora District, Ontario
- Coordinates: 50°53′17″N 94°59′08″W
- Type: lake
- Part of: Hudson Bay drainage basin
- Primary inflows: Haggart River
- Primary outflows: Haggart River
- Basin countries: Canada
- Max. length: 8.9 km (5.5 mi)
- Max. width: 6.5 km (4.0 mi)
- Surface elevation: 359 m (1,178 ft)

Haggart Lake is a lake in the Unorganized Part of Kenora District in Northwestern Ontario, Canada. It is in the Hudson Bay drainage basin and within Woodland Caribou Provincial Park.

The primary inflow, at the south, and outflow, at the north, is the Haggart River. The Haggart River flows via Carroll Lake, the Gammon River, the Bloodvein River, Lake Winnipeg, and the Nelson River to Hudson Bay.

== See also ==
- List of lakes in Ontario
