= Haven Creek (Ontario) =

- Location of the mouth of the creek in Ontario

Location
- Country: Canada
- Province: Ontario
- Region: Northwestern Ontario
- District: Kenora
- Part: Unorganized Kenora District

Physical characteristics
- Source: unnamed lake
  - coordinates: 50°53′43″N 94°49′29″W
  - elevation: 367 m (1,204 ft)
- Mouth: Rostoul Lake
  - coordinates: 50°56′24″N 94°46′34″W
  - elevation: 337 m (1,106 ft)

Basin features
- River system: Hudson Bay drainage basin

Haven Creek is a stream in the Unorganized Part of Kenora District in Northwestern Ontario, Canada. It is in the Hudson Bay drainage basin, is a left tributary of the Rostoul River, and is within Woodland Caribou Provincial Park.

== Course ==
The creek begins at unnamed lake and flows north to the south end of Haven Lake. It heads northeast, passes through an unnamed lake, and reaches its mouth on the west side of Rostoul Lake on the Rostoul River. The Rostoul River flows via the Gammon River, the Bloodvein River, Lake Winnipeg, and the Nelson River to Hudson Bay.
