= Upper Lake =

Upper Lake may refer to:

Populated places

- Upper Lake, California, a census-designated place in Lake County, California, United States

Lakes

- Upper Lake, Bhopal, former name for the lake in Bhopal, India; now known as Bhojtal.
- Upper Lake in Missoula County, Montana
- Upper Lake in Sanders County, Montana
- Glendalough Upper Lake, in County Wicklow, Ireland
