= Moon Lake =

Moon Lake may refer to:

== Places ==
=== Canada ===
- Moon Lake, Alberta
- Moon Lake (British Columbia), a lake on Mission Ridge in British Columbia
- Moon Lake, a lake in Riding Mountain National Park, Manitoba
- Moon Lake, a lake in Manitoba, source of the Minago River
- Moon Lake, a lake of Nova Scotia
- Moon Lake (GTP Block 6 Township, Thunder Bay District), a lake in Thunder Bay District, Ontario
- Moon Lake (Syine Township, Thunder Bay District), a lake in Thunder Bay District, Ontario
- Moon Lake (Cockeram Township, Thunder Bay District), a lake in Thunder Bay District, Ontario
- Moon Lake (Sudbury District), a lake in Sudbury District, Ontario
- Moon Lake (Cochrane District), a lake in Cochrane District, Ontario
- Moon Lake (Temagami), a lake in Temagami, Ontario
- Moon Lake (White Township, Nipissing District), a lake in Nipissing District, Ontario
- Moon Lake (Wawa), a lake in Wawa, Ontario
- Moon Lake (Neebing), a lake in Neebing, Ontario
- Moon Lake (Viel Township, Algoma District), a lake in Algoma District, Ontario
- Moon Lake (Timiskaming District), a lake in Timiskaming District, Ontario
- Moon Lake (Garden River 14), a lake in the Garden River 14 reserve, Ontario
- Moon Lake (Kenora District), a lake in Kenora District, Ontario
- Moon Lake (Monestime Township, Algoma District), a lake in Algoma District, Ontario
- Moon Lake (Greater Sudbury), a lake in Greater Sudbury, Ontario

=== China ===
- Moon Lake (Ningbo), a lake

=== India, Himalayas ===
- Chandra Taal, Lake of the Moon

=== United States ===
- Moon Lakes in Arkansas County, Arkansas
- Moon Lake in Desha County, Arkansas
- Moon Lake in Monroe County, Arkansas
- Moon Lake in Ouachita County, Arkansas
- Moon Lake in White County, Arkansas
- Moon Lake, Florida, an unincorporated community in Pasco County
- Moon Lake (Berrien County, Michigan), a lake
- Moon Lake (Minnesota), a lake in Douglas County
- Moon Lake (Mississippi), a lake in Coahoma County
- Moon Lake, Mississippi, an unincorporated community in Mississippi
- Moon Lake (Jefferson County, New York), a lake
- Moon Lake State Forest Recreation Area, Luzerne County, Pennsylvania
- Moon Lake (Utah), a lake

== Other uses ==
- Moon Lake (film), a 2009 Bulgarian-German-French art film by Ivan Stanev
- Moon Lake, a 2021 novel by Joe R. Lansdale
- Moon Lake (microprocessor), an upcoming entry-level mobile processor by Intel.

== See also ==
- Mondsee (disambiguation)
