= Hammerhead Lake =

- Location in Ontario
- Location: Kenora District, Ontario
- Coordinates: 51°00′12″N 94°50′27″W
- Type: lake
- Part of: Hudson Bay drainage basin
- River sources: Gammon River, Rostoul River
- Primary outflows: Gammon River
- Basin countries: Canada
- Max. length: 7 km (4.3 mi)
- Max. width: 3.5 km (2.2 mi)
- Surface elevation: 337 m (1,106 ft)

Hammerhead Lake is a lake in the Unorganized Part of Kenora District in Northwestern Ontario, Canada. It is in the Hudson Bay drainage basin, and is within Woodland Caribou Provincial Park.

The primary inflows are the Gammon River, arriving from Gammon Lake at the east, and the Rostoul River, arriving from Rostoul Lake at the south. The primary outflow, at the north, and leading to Donald Lake, is the Gammon River, which flows via the Bloodvein River, Lake Winnipeg, and the Nelson River to Hudson Bay.

== See also ==
- List of lakes in Ontario
