= Leano Lake =

Lake in Ontario, Canada

- Location within Ontario
- Location: Ontario
- Coordinates: 50.78°N 94.44°W

Leano Lake is a lake in the Kenora District of Ontario, Canada. It is located in the southeastern part of Woodland Caribou Provincial Park.

== Recreation & Canoe Route ==
Leano Lake is one of the road-access points for Woodland Caribou Provincial Park, where visitors travel from this point into the park's wilderness via canoeing as there are no more roads into the park.

Leano Lake is the starting point for the Leano Lake Loop, a canoe route that travels through multiple lakes in the southeastern part of the park, such as Mexican Hat Lake, Aegean Lake, Burnt Rock Lake, Glen Lake, and Wrist Lake. You can return to Leano Lake via Aegean Lake.

The Leano Lake Loop takes roughly 1 week to complete.

== Fish ==
Leano Lake contains Lake trout.

== See also ==
- Woodland Caribou Provincial Park
- List of lakes of Ontario
