= Wrist Lake =

- Location within Ontario
- Location: Ontario
- Coordinates: 50.866°N 94.747°W

Wrist Lake is a lake in the Kenora District of Ontario, Canada. It is located in the Woodland Caribou Provincial Park.

== Recreation & Canoe Route ==
Wrist Lake forms part of a canoe route known as the Leano Lake Loop.

== Fish ==
Wrist Lake contains Lake trout and Northern pike.

== See also ==
- List of lakes of Ontario
- Woodland Caribou Provincial Park
