= Anna Lake =

#redirectList of lakes of Minnesota

Anna Lake or Ana Lake may refer to:

- Several lakes in Ontario, Canada
- Three lakes in Minnesota, US
- Anna Lake, a descendant of Henry Seymour (16th-century MP)

== See also ==
- Lake Anna
- Lake Sfânta Ana (Saint Anna Lake), Romania
- Lake Ann (disambiguation)
- Lac Ste. Anne (disambiguation)
