= Mexican Hat Lake =

Lake in Ontario, Canada

- Location within Ontario
- Location: Ontario
- Coordinates: 50.86°N 94.64°W

Mexican Hat Lake is a lake in the Kenora District of Ontario, Canada. It is located in the southeast part of Woodland Caribou Provincial Park.

== Recreation ==
Mexican Hat Lake forms part of a canoe route known as the Leano Lake Loop.

== Waterfalls ==
Waterfalls are located at the southern end of Mexican Hat Lake.

== Etymology ==
The lake is named because of its resemblance to a Sombrero, which is a Mexican hat.

== Fish ==
Mexican Hat Lake contains Lake trout, Northern pike, and Walleye.

== See Also ==
- List of lakes of Ontario
- Woodland Caribou Provincial Park
