= Carroll Lake (Ontario-Manitoba) =

- Location in Ontario straddling the border with Manitoba
- Location: Kenora District, Ontario; and Manitoba
- Coordinates: 51°06′01″N 95°04′35″W
- Type: lake
- Part of: Hudson Bay drainage basin
- Primary inflows: Gammon River, Haggart River
- Primary outflows: Gammon River
- Basin countries: Canada
- Max. length: 20 km (12 mi)
- Max. width: 7 km (4.3 mi)
- Surface elevation: 325 m (1,066 ft)

Carroll Lake is an irregularly-shaped lake in the province of Manitoba, and in the Unorganized Part of Kenora District in Northwestern province of Ontario, Canada. It is in the Hudson Bay drainage basin, and, with the exception of portions of two small bays in the west, lies mostly in Ontario. The Ontario portion of the lake is within Woodland Caribou Provincial Park, and the small Manitoba portions within Atikaki Provincial Wilderness Park.

There are two primary inflows: the Haggart River at the south, and the Gammon River at the southeast. There are numerous secondary unnamed inflows. The primary outflow, at the west, is the Gammon River, which flows via the Bloodvein River, Lake Winnipeg, and the Nelson River to Hudson Bay.

== See also ==
- List of lakes in Ontario
