= List of lakes of Sanders County, Montana =

There are at least 66 named lakes and reservoirs in Sanders County, Montana.

== Lakes ==
- Acorn Lake, 47°28′32″N 115°08′53″W, el. 5,991 feet (1,826 m)
- Arrowhead Lake, 47°40′54″N 115°15′42″W, el. 5,955 feet (1,815 m)
- Baldy Lake, 47°36′59″N 114°49′09″W, el. 6,729 feet (2,051 m)
- Banana Lake, 47°30′55″N 114°50′26″W, el. 3,596 feet (1,096 m)
- Bass Pond, 47°19′02″N 114°48′51″W, el. 2,503 feet (763 m)
- Bear Lake, 47°49′39″N 115°22′48″W, el. 5,994 feet (1,827 m)
- Beaver Lake, 47°37′37″N 115°41′41″W, el. 5,712 feet (1,741 m)
- Beaver Lake, 47°37′15″N 115°41′28″W, el. 5,797 feet (1,767 m)
- Berry Lake, 47°44′49″N 115°46′50″W, el. 5,476 feet (1,669 m)
- Blossom Lakes, 47°33′05″N 115°44′44″W, el. 5,673 feet (1,729 m)
- Buck Lake, 48°00′28″N 115°34′21″W, el. 4,396 feet (1,340 m)
- Burgess Lake, 47°19′59″N 114°39′46″W, el. 2,900 feet (880 m)
- Cabin Lake, 47°42′24″N 115°16′49″W, el. 5,912 feet (1,802 m)
- Carbine Lake, 47°44′03″N 115°16′38″W, el. 6,079 feet (1,853 m)
- Cliff Lake, 48°04′22″N 115°40′41″W, el. 6,713 feet (2,046 m)
- Copper Lake, 48°04′37″N 115°41′04″W, el. 6,404 feet (1,952 m)
- Corona Lake, 47°38′25″N 114°51′02″W, el. 5,023 feet (1,531 m)
- Crescent Lake, 47°54′15″N 115°12′40″W, el. 4,039 feet (1,231 m)
- Deer Lake, 47°39′21″N 115°15′54″W, el. 5,948 feet (1,813 m)
- Duckhead Lake, 47°40′03″N 115°15′59″W, el. 6,112 feet (1,863 m)
- East Lake, 47°44′13″N 115°46′44″W, el. 5,597 feet (1,706 m)
- Elk Lake, 47°53′58″N 115°23′58″W, el. 4,222 feet (1,287 m)
- Engle Lake, 48°00′37″N 115°37′57″W, el. 6,092 feet (1,857 m)
- Evans Lake, 47°31′51″N 115°41′19″W, el. 5,433 feet (1,656 m)
- Fishtrap Lake, 47°52′07″N 115°11′46″W, el. 4,055 feet (1,236 m)
- Frog Lake, 47°41′39″N 115°16′41″W, el. 6,040 feet (1,840 m)
- Goat Lakes, 47°38′29″N 115°16′20″W, el. 6,197 feet (1,889 m)
- Grass Lake, 47°41′32″N 115°17′07″W, el. 6,152 feet (1,875 m)
- Graves Lake, 47°43′05″N 115°17′22″W, el. 6,063 feet (1,848 m)
- Grouse Lake, 47°49′54″N 115°23′09″W, el. 5,709 feet (1,740 m)
- Honeymoon Lake, 47°40′33″N 115°14′53″W, el. 5,748 feet (1,752 m)
- Image Lake, 47°45′42″N 115°17′31″W, el. 5,873 feet (1,790 m)
- Isabella Lake, 48°05′52″N 115°38′24″W, el. 6,795 feet (2,071 m)
- Knowles Lake, 47°41′27″N 115°16′48″W, el. 5,997 feet (1,828 m)
- Lawn Lake, 47°43′21″N 115°17′57″W, el. 6,122 feet (1,866 m)
- Little Ibex Lake, 48°11′58″N 115°44′19″W, el. 5,180 feet (1,580 m)
- Lower Thompson Lake, 48°01′11″N 115°02′00″W, el. 3,333 feet (1,016 m)
- Marmot Lakes, 47°49′03″N 115°22′31″W, el. 5,800 feet (1,800 m)
- Ninetythree Mile Lake, 47°45′35″N 115°49′44″W, el. 5,305 feet (1,617 m)
- Outlaw Lake, 47°32′56″N 115°11′21″W, el. 5,712 feet (1,741 m)
- Pear Lake, 47°32′25″N 115°44′26″W, el. 6,188 feet (1,886 m)
- Porcupine Lake, 47°41′50″N 115°16′56″W, el. 6,001 feet (1,829 m)
- Quail Lake, 47°32′23″N 115°10′59″W, el. 5,991 feet (1,826 m)
- Rainbow Lake, 47°31′32″N 114°45′39″W, el. 3,589 feet (1,094 m)
- Rock Lake, 48°03′50″N 115°37′54″W, el. 4,961 feet (1,512 m)
- Rush Lake, 47°49′44″N 115°21′27″W, el. 5,358 feet (1,633 m)
- Saint Paul Lake, 48°05′22″N 115°39′36″W, el. 4,718 feet (1,438 m)
- Schmitz Lakes, 47°33′24″N 114°35′00″W, el. 3,195 feet (974 m)
- Smiley Slough, 47°26′23″N 114°51′51″W, el. 2,457 feet (749 m)
- Snowshoe Lake, 48°13′45″N 115°42′52″W, el. 6,148 feet (1,874 m)
- Stony Lake, 47°47′06″N 115°15′38″W, el. 5,499 feet (1,676 m)
- Sylvan Lake, 47°48′35″N 115°21′42″W, el. 5,515 feet (1,681 m)
- Terrace Lake, 47°46′12″N 115°15′27″W, el. 5,774 feet (1,760 m)
- Thompson Lakes, 48°02′13″N 115°05′00″W, el. 3,333 feet (1,016 m)
- Tuffys Lake, 47°30′55″N 115°09′34″W, el. 6,509 feet (1,984 m)
- Twin Lakes, 47°58′39″N 115°03′36″W, el. 3,878 feet (1,182 m)
- Upper Fishtrap Lake, 47°52′31″N 115°12′15″W, el. 4,078 feet (1,243 m)
- Upper Lake, 48°00′14″N 115°36′00″W, el. 5,928 feet (1,807 m)
- Wanless Lake, 48°00′45″N 115°35′22″W, el. 5,095 feet (1,553 m)
- Winniemuck Lake, 47°43′00″N 115°18′09″W, el. 6,247 feet (1,904 m)

== Reservoirs ==
- Cabinet Gorge Reservoir, 48°05′08″N 116°03′21″W, el. 2,178 feet (664 m)
- Dry Fork Reservoir, 47°41′59″N 114°39′59″W, el. 2,861 feet (872 m)
- Noxon Rapids Reservoir, 47°57′36″N 115°44′04″W, el. 2,264 feet (690 m)
- Noxon Reservoir, 47°57′45″N 115°43′58″W, el. 2,326 feet (709 m)
- Thompson Falls Reservoir, 47°36′21″N 115°17′59″W, el. 2,972 feet (906 m)
- Upper Dry Fork Reservoir, 47°44′55″N 114°40′58″W, el. 2,933 feet (894 m)

== See also ==
- List of lakes in Montana
