= Rostoul River =

- Location of the mouth of the creek in Ontario

Location
- Country: Canada
- Province: Ontario
- Region: Northwestern Ontario
- District: Kenora
- Part: Unorganized Kenora District

Physical characteristics
- Source: Embryo Lake
  - coordinates: 50°56′59″N 94°24′46″W
  - elevation: 381 m (1,250 ft)
- Mouth: Hammerhead Lake
  - coordinates: 50°59′02″N 94°49′39″W
  - elevation: 337 m (1,106 ft)

Basin features
- River system: Hudson Bay drainage basin

The Rostoul River is a river in the Unorganized Part of Kenora District in Northwestern Ontario, Canada. It is in the Hudson Bay drainage basin, is a left tributary of the Gammon River, and is within Woodland Caribou Provincial Park.

== Course ==
The river begins at Embryo Lake and flows southwest to the north side of Telescope Lake, then leaves that lake at the west and heads west in the direction of Optic Lake, arriving at that lake's northeast end. It leaves the lake at the west and heads southwest to the southeast end of Glenn Lake, then leaves that lake at the northwest heading west to the southeast end of Hansen Lake, where it takes in the right tributary Domain Creek. The river leaves Hansen Lake at the northwest and heads northwest to the southeast end of Rostoul Lake, where it takes in the left tributary Haven Creek, then flows north and reaches its mouth on the south side of Hammerhead Lake on the Rostoul River. The Rostoul River flows via the Gammon River, the Bloodvein River, Lake Winnipeg, and the Nelson River to Hudson Bay.
