= List of lakes of Ontario: A =

This is a list of lakes of Ontario beginning with the letter A.

== A–Ab ==
- Lake A
- A Lake
- Aaron Lake (Timiskaming District)
- Aaron Lake (Kenora District)
- Abamasagi Lake
- Abamategwia Lake
- Abams Lake
- Abate Lake
- Abazotikichuan Lake
- Abbe Lake
- Abbess Lake
- Abbey Lake
- Abbie Lake
- Abbotsford Lake
- Abbott Lake (Sudbury District)
- Abbott Lake (Kenora District)
- Abbott Lake (Frontenac County)
- Abbott Lake (Rainy River District)
- Abelson Lake
- Aber Lake
- Abernethy Lake
- Abes Lake
- Abie Lake
- Abigogami Lake
- Abimatinu Lake
- Abinette Lake
- Lake Abitibi
- Abney Lake
- Abram Lake (Kenora District)
- Abram Lake (Cochrane District)
- Abs Lake

== Ac ==
- Acanthus Lake
- Ace Lake (Thunder Bay District)
- Ace Lake (Sudbury District)
- Acer Lake
- Achapi Lake
- Acheson Lake (Rainy River District)
- Acheson Lake (Sudbury District)
- Achigan Lake
- Acid Lake
- Acker Lake
- Ackerman Lake
- Acme Lake (Algoma District)
- Acme Lake (Nipissing District)
- Acolyte Lake
- Aconda Lake
- Acorn Lake
- Acre Lake
- Acton Lake
- Acton Pond

== Ad ==
- Ada Lake (Muskoka District)
- Ada Lake (Sudbury District)
- Ada Lake (Thunder Bay District)
- Adagio Lake
- Adair Lake (Kenora District)
- Adair Lake (Adrian Township, Thunder Bay District)
- Adair Lake (Sound Creek, Thunder Bay District)
- Adam Lake
- Adamac Lake
- Adamhay Lake
- Adams Lake (Muskoka District)
- Adams Lake (Lanark County)
- Adams Lake (Renfrew County)
- Adams Lake (Sudbury District)
- Adams Lake (Haliburton County)
- Adamson Lake (Timiskaming District)
- Adamson Lake (Kenora District)
- Adanac Lake
- Add Lake
- Addie Lake
- Addington Lake
- Addison Lake (Thunder Bay District)
- Addison Lake (Sudbury District)
- Adel Lake
- Adelaide Lake (Sudbury District)
- Adelaide Lake (Algoma District)
- Adelard Lake
- Adele Lake
- Adik Lake
- Adios Lake
- Admiral Lake
- Admit Lake
- Adobe Lake
- Adrian Lake
- Adrienne Lake
- Adventure Lake
- Adze Lake

== Ae–Af ==
- Aegean Lake
- Aerial Lake (Kenora District)
- Aerial Lake (Thunder Bay District)
- Aerobus Lake
- Aerofoil Lake
- Aeroplane Lake
- Affleck Lake (Kenora District)
- Affleck Lake (Sudbury District)
- A-frame Lake

== Ag ==
- Agam Lake
- Agar Lake
- Agassiz Lake
- Agate Lake (Peterborough County)
- Agate Lake (Thunder Bay District)
- Agate Lake (Cochrane District)
- Agawa Lake
- Agawa Station Lake
- Agimak Lake
- Agnes Lake (Rainy River District)
- Agnes Lake (Parry Sound District)
- Agnew Lake (Sudbury District)
- Agnew Lake (Kenora District)
- Agonzon Lake
- Agreen Lake
- Aguasabon Lake
- Ague Lake
- Agusada Lake
- Agusk Lake
- Agutua Lake

== Ah–Ai ==
- Ahdik Lake
- Ahern Lake
- Ahmabel Lake
- Ahme Lake
- Ahmic Lake
- Ahsine Lake
- Aiabewatik Lake
- Aide Lake
- Aikens Lake
- Aikman Lake
- Aileen Lake
- Ainslie Lake
- Air Hole Lake
- Aird Lake
- Airplane Lake (Sudbury District)
- Airplane Lake (Algoma District)
- Airport Lake (Algoma District)
- Airport Lake (Thunder Bay District)
- Airstrip Lake
- Airy Lake
- Aitken Lake (Algoma District)
- Aitken Lake (Cochrane District)

== Aj–Ak ==
- Ajax Lake
- Akandamo Lakes
- Akebia Lake
- Akey Lake
- Aki Lake
- Akin Lakes
- Akonesi Lake
- Akonewi Lake
- Akow Lake
- Akron Lakes
- Akweskwa Lake

== Al ==
- Alabama Lake
- Alaska's Lake
- Alba Lake
- Albert Lake (Kenora District)
- Albert Lake (Algoma District)
- Albert Lake (Lahontan Township, Thunder Bay District)
- Albert Lake (Fleming Township, Rainy River District)
- Albert Lake (Burntside Lake, Rainy River District)
- Albert Lake (Arnott Lake, Thunder Bay District)
- Albert Lake (Gzowski Township, Thunder Bay District)
- Albert Lake (Renfrew County)
- Alberta Lake
- Albion Lake
- Alces Lake
- Alco Lake
- Alcock Lake
- Alcona Lake
- Alcorn Lake
- Alden Lake (Martel Township, Algoma District)
- Alden Lake (Corbriere Township, Algoma District)
- Alder Lake (Peterborough County)
- Alder Lake (Waterloo Region)
- Alder Lake (Kenora District)
- Alder Lake (Nipissing District)
- Aldon Lake
- Aldous Lake
- Aldred Lake
- Aldridge Lake
- Ale Lake
- Aleck Lake
- Alex Lake (Algoma District)
- Alex Lake (Kenora District)
- Alex Lake (Cochrane District)
- Alexander Lake (Nipissing District)
- Alexander Lake (Hughson Township, Algoma District)
- Alexander Lake (Kenora District)
- Alexander Lake (Cochrane District)
- Alexander Lake (Duncan Township, Algoma District)
- Alexander Lake (Sudbury District)
- Alexander Lake (Timiskaming District)
- Alexandra Lake
- Alexandre Lake
- Alexis Lake
- Alf Lake (Laughren Township, Algoma District)
- Alf Lake (Marjorie Township, Algoma District)
- Alfes Lake
- Alford Lake (Morah Lake, Kenora District)
- Alford Lake (Graves Township, Kenora District)
- Alfred Lake (Kenora District)
- Alfred Lake (Nipissing District)
- Alfred Lake (Thunder Bay District)
- Alfreda Lake
- Alga Lake
- Algocen Lake
- Algonquin Lake
- Alguire Lake
- Alice Lake (Kenora District)
- Alice Lake (Dickson Township, Nipissing District)
- Alice Lake (Ashley Township, Algoma District)
- Alice Lake (Greater Sudbury)
- Alice Lake (Timiskaming District)
- Alice Lake (Rainy River District)
- Alice Lake (Leclaire Township, Algoma District)
- Alice Lake (Gaudry Township, Algoma District)
- Alice Lake (Hartle Township, Nipissing District)
- Alice Lake (Sudbury District)
- Alike Lake
- Alister Lake
- Aljo Lake
- Alkenore Lake
- Allan Lake (Rowan Lake, Kenora District)
- Allan Lake (Temagami)
- Allan Lake (Clifford Township, Cochrane District)
- Allan Lake (Fitzgerald Township, Nipissing District)
- Allan Lake (Rainy River District)
- Allan Lake (Thunder Bay District)
- Allan Lake (Neely Township, Cochrane District)
- Allan Lake (Sioux Lookout)
- Allan Lake (McEachern Lake, Cochrane District)
- Allan Park Trout Pond
- Allard Lake (Olink Lake, Thunder Bay District)
- Allard Lake (Algoma District)
- Allard Lake (Seseganaga Lake, Thunder Bay District)
- Allbright Lake
- Allely Lake
- Allen Lake (Rainy River District)
- Allen Lake (Killarney)
- Allen Lake (Riggs Township, Algoma District)
- Allen Lake (Hughson Township, Algoma District)
- Allen Lake (Corbiere Township, Algoma District)
- Allen Lake (Haliburton County)
- Allen Lake (Blind River)
- Allen Lake (Hastings County)
- Allen Lake (Cunningham Township, Sudbury District)
- Allen Lakes
- Allenby Lake
- Allens Lakes
- Alligator Lake
- Allin Lake (Sudbury District)
- Allin Lake (Kenora District)
- Allison Lake
- Allumette Lake
- Alluring Lake
- Alm Lake
- Alma Lake (Thunder Bay District)
- Alma Lake (Timiskaming District)
- Alma Lake (Sudbury District)
- Alma Lake (Algoma District)
- Almo Lake
- Almon Lake
- Almonte Lake
- Alonghill Lake
- Alph Lake
- Alpha Lake (Athelstane Creek, Thunder Bay District)
- Alpha Lake (Algoma District)
- Alpha Lake (Dwight Lake, Thunder Bay District)
- Alpha Lake (Sudbury District)
- Alpine Lake (Algoma District)
- Alpine Lake (Cochrane District)
- Alport Lake
- Alsever Lake
- Alston Lake (Sudbury District)
- Alston Lake (Kenora District)
- Altar Lake
- Altimeter Lake
- Altitude Lake
- Alto Lake
- Alton Lake
- Alva Lake
- Alvin Lake
- Alwyn Lake

== Am ==
- Amable Lakes
- Amaleen Lake
- Amanda Lake
- Ambrose Lake (Thunder Bay District)
- Ambrose Lake (Algoma District)
- Amelia Lake (Algoma District)
- Amelia Lake (Sudbury District)
- Ameliasburg Mill Pond
- American Cabin Lake
- Ames Lake
- Amesdale Lake
- Ameson Lake
- Amethyst Lake
- Amik Lake (Algoma District)
- Amik Lake (Rainy River District)
- Amik Lake (Cochrane District)
- Amik Lake (Max Creek, Thunder Bay District)
- Amik Lake (Kenora District)
- Amik Lake (Greenstone)
- Amikeus Lake
- Amikogaming Lake
- Amikougami Lake
- Amlin Lake
- Amoeba Lake
- Amos Lake (Thunder Bay District)
- Amos Lake (Sudbury District)
- Amos Lake (Timiskaming District)
- Amp Lake
- Amra Lake
- Amwri Lake
- Amy Lake (Sudbury District)
- Amy Lake (Algoma District)
- Amylou Lake
- Amyoa Lake

== An ==
- Ana Lake
- Anahareo Lake
- Anape Lake
- Anaway Lake
- Anchor Lake (Rainy River District)
- Anchor Lake (Kenora District)
- Anchor Lake (Cochrane District)
- Anchor Lake (Sudbury District)
- Ancliff Lake
- Anders Lake
- Andersen Lake
- Anderson Lake (Tolstoi Township, Cochrane District)
- Anderson Lake (Favell Lake, Cochrane District)
- Anderson Lake (Nipissing District)
- Anderson Lake (Sturgeon Lake, Thunder Bay District)
- Anderson Lake (Sudbury District)
- Anderson Lake (Wawa)
- Anderson Lake (Timiskaming District)
- Anderson Lake (Black River-Matheson)
- Anderson Lake (St. Ignace Island, Thunder Bay District)
- Anderson Lake (Kwetabohigan River, Cochrane District)
- Anderson Lake (Frost Township, Algoma District)
- Anderson Lake (Shuniah)
- Anderson Lake (Anderson Township, Algoma District)
- Anderson Lake (MacFie Township, Kenora District)
- Anderson Lake (Haliburton County)
- Anderson Lake (Anderson Creek, Kenora District)
- Anderson Lake (Lanark County)
- Anderson Lake (Grey County)
- Anderson Lake (Ontario–Manitoba)
- Anderson Pond
- Andre Lake
- Andress Lake
- Andrew Lake (Cochrane District)
- Andrew Lake (Lanark County)
- Andrews Lake (Colquhoun Township, Cochrane District)
- Andrews Lake (Sudbury District)
- Andrews Lake (Rainy River District)
- Andrews Lake (Kawartha Lakes)
- Andrews Lake (McCool Township, Cochrane District)
- Androsace Lake
- Andy Lake (Lang Lake, Kenora District)
- Andy Lake (Thunder Bay District)
- Andy Lake (Timiskaming District)
- Andy Lake (Sudbury District)
- Andy Lake (Sioux Narrows-Nestor Falls)
- Andy Thompson Lake
- Anelia Lake
- Anenimus Lake
- Aneroid Lake
- Angekum Lake
- Angel Lake (Stewart Creek, Thunder Bay District)
- Angel Lake (Muskoka District)
- Angel Lake (Tuuri Township, Thunder Bay District)
- Angela Lake
- Angelina Lake
- Anger Lake
- Angle Lake (Algoma District)
- Angle Lake (Thunder Bay District)
- Angle Lake (Sudbury District)
- Angler Lake
- Angling Lake
- Angood Lake
- Angus Lake (Nipissing District)
- Angus Lake (Sudbury District)
- Angus Lake (Algoma District)
- Anibel Lake
- Anima Nipissing Lake
- Animons Lake
- Animoosh Lake
- Anishinabi Lake
- Anita Lake (Algoma District)
- Anita Lake (Manitoba–Ontario)
- Anizev Lake
- Anjigame Lake
- Anjigami Lake
- Anjigaming Lake
- Ankcorn Lake
- Ankrom Lake
- Ann Lake (Redditt Township, Kenora District)
- Ann Lake (Sudbury District)
- Ann Lake (Algoma District)
- Ann Lake (Rice Township, Kenora District)
- Anna Lake (Ontario)
- Anna Lee Lake
- Annable Lake
- Annas Lake
- Anne Lake
- Annette Lake (Armistice Creek, Thunder Bay District)
- Annette Lake (Greenstone)
- Annex Lake (Sudbury District)
- Annex Lake (Algoma District)
- Annibal Lake
- Annie Lake (Halliday Township, Sudbury District)
- Annie Lake (Muskoka District)
- Annie Lake (Kenora District)
- Annie Lake (Killarney)
- Annie Lake (Algoma District)
- Annies Lake
- Annimwash Lake
- Annis Lake
- Anns Lake
- Another Lake
- Anrev Lake
- Ans Lake
- Ansell Lake
- Anselmi Lake
- Ansig Lake
- Anson Lake (Kenora District)
- Anson Lake (Haliburton County)
- Anstey Lake
- Anstruther Lake
- Ant Island Lake
- Ante Lake
- Anteater Lake
- Antenna Lake
- Anthemis Lake
- Anthony Lake
- Antler Lake (Brightsand River, Thunder Bay District)
- Antler Lake (Sudbury District)
- Antler Lake (St. Ignace Island, Thunder Bay District)
- Antler Lake (Renfrew County)
- Antler Lake (Lahontan Township, Thunder Bay District)
- Antler Lake (Meinzinger Township, Thunder Bay District)
- Antler Lake (Kenora District)
- Antoine Lake (Rainy River District)
- Antoine Lake (Algoma District)
- Antoine Lake (Frontenac County)
- Antoine Lake (Nipissing District)
- Anton Lake
- Antrim Lake
- Anubis Lake
- Anvil Lake (Timiskaming District)
- Anvil Lake (Algoma District)

== Ap ==
- Apex Lake (Timiskaming District)
- Apex Lake (Kenora District)
- Apisabigo Lake
- Apitu Lake
- Apollo Lake
- Appelle Lake
- Appelo Lake
- Appendix Lake
- Apple Lake (Shawanaga Township, Parry Sound District)
- Apple Lake (Nipissing District)
- Apple Lake (Whitestone)
- Appleby Lake
- Applesauce Lake
- Apps Lake
- April Lake
- Apsey Lake
- Apsley Lake
- Apukwa Lake
- Apungsisagen Lake

== Aq ==
- Aquarius Lake
- Aquatuk Lake
- Aquiline Lake
- Lake Aquitaine

== Ar ==
- Ara Lake
- Arab Lake
- Arabella Lake
- Arabi Lake
- Aragon Lake
- Aralia Lake
- Aramis Lake
- Arbeesee Lake
- Arber Lake
- Arbour Lake
- Arbuckle Lake
- Arbutus Lake (Nipissing District)
- Arbutus Lake (Sudbury District)
- Arc Lake
- Arcand Lake
- Archambeau Lake
- Archer Lake
- Archibald Lake
- Archie Lake
- Archie's Lake
- Archies Lake
- Arcol Lake
- Arden Lake (Sudbury District)
- Arden Lake (Frontenac County)
- Ardis Lake
- Ardoch Lake
- Aremis Lake
- Arethusa Lake
- Argo Lake (Algoma District)
- Argo Lake (Rainy River District)
- Argo Lake (Cochrane District)
- Argon Lake
- Argosy Lake (Kenora District)
- Argosy Lake (Algoma District)
- Argue Lake (Nipissing District)
- Argue Lake (Parry Sound District)
- Arguing Lake
- Argyle Lake
- Arib Lake
- Aries Lake
- Ariott Lake
- Arkon Lake
- Arliss Lake
- Arlotte Lake
- Arm Lake (Comox Township, Sudbury District)
- Arm Lake (Thunder Bay District)
- Arm Lake (Foy Township, Sudbury District)
- Arm Lake (Kenora District)
- Armatta Lake
- Armer Lake
- Armes Lake
- Armin Lake
- Armishaw Lake
- Armistice Lake
- Armit Lake
- Armitage Lake (Algoma District)
- Armitage Lake (Kenora District)
- Armitage Lake (Cochrane District)
- Armour Lake (Algoma District)
- Armour Lake (Armour Creek, Kenora District)
- Armour Lake (Mackie Lake, Kenora District)
- Arms Lake (Rainy River District)
- Arms Lake (Thunder Bay District)
- Armstrong Lake (Algoma District)
- Armstrong Lake (Totten Township, Sudbury District)
- Armstrong Lake (Nickels Lake, Kenora District)
- Armstrong Lake (Penhorwood Township, Sudbury District)
- Armstrong Lake (Redditt Township, Kenora District)
- Armstrong Lake (Thunder Bay District)
- Armstrong Lake (Parry Sound District)
- Armstrongs Lake
- Army Lake (Kenora District)
- Army Lake (Algoma District)
- Arneil Lake
- Arneson Lake
- Arnold Lake (Rainy River District)
- Arnold Lake (Sudbury District)
- Arnot Lake
- Arnott Lake (Parry Sound District)
- Arnott Lake (Algoma District)
- Arnott Lake (Lennox and Addington County)
- Arnott Lake (Thunder Bay District)
- Arnston Lake
- Aronson Lake
- Arp Lake
- Arpin Lake
- Arps Lake
- Arran Lake
- Arras Lake
- Arrell Lake
- Arril Lake
- Arrow Lake (Cochrane District)
- Arrow Lake (Papineau-Cameron)
- Arrow Lake (Arrow River, Thunder Bay District)
- Arrow Lake (Pentland Township, Nipissing District)
- Arrow Lake (Wapikaimaski Lake, Thunder Bay District)
- Arrow Lake (Kenora District)
- Arrowhead Lake (Muskoka District)
- Arrowhead Lake (Algoma District)
- Arrowhead Lake (Thunder Bay District)
- Arrowhead Lake (Kenora District)
- Arrowroot Lake
- Arsenic Lake
- Art Lake (Rawn Lake, Rainy River District)
- Art Lake (Haliburton County)
- Art Lake (Atikokan)
- Artery Lake
- Arthur Lake (Cochrane District)
- Arthur Lake (Parry Sound District)
- Arthur Lake (Algoma District)
- Arthur Lake (Timiskaming District)
- Artie Lake
- Artist Lake
- Arundel Lake
- Arva Lake
- Aryhart Lake

== As ==
- Ascalon Lake
- Ash Lake (Marsh Township, Sudbury District)
- Ash Lake (Kenora District)
- Ash Lake (Rainy River District)
- Ash Lake (Yeo Township, Sudbury District)
- Ashball Lake
- Ashburn Lake
- Ashby Lake
- Ashby White Lake
- Asheigamo Lake
- Ashigami Lake
- Ashkewe Lake
- Ashley Lake
- Ashmore Lake (Priske Township, Thunder Bay District)
- Ashmore Lake (Greenstone)
- Ashton Lake
- Asinn Lake
- Asio Lake
- Asipoquobah Lake
- Askwith Lake
- Asp Lake
- Assapan Lake
- Asselin Lake
- Assin Lake (Pipestone River, Kenora District)
- Assin Lake (Broderick Township, Kenora District)
- Assinamish Lake
- Assinkepatakiso Lake
- Aster Lake
- Aster Pond
- Aston Lake
- Astonish Lake
- Astrolabe Lake
- Astrop Lake

== At ==
- Atekepi Lake
- Athelstane Lake
- Athlone Lake
- Athos Lake
- Atigogama Lake
- Atik Lake (Kenora District)
- Atik Lake (Thunder Bay District)
- Atik Lake (Algoma District)
- Atikameg Lake (Atikameg Township, Thunder Bay District)
- Atikameg Lake (Kenora District)
- Atikameg Lake (Danford Township, Thunder Bay District)
- Atikamik Lake
- Atikasibi Lake
- Atikokiwam Lake
- Atikomik Lake
- Atikwa Lake
- Atim Lake
- Atkins Lake (Muskoka District)
- Atkins Lake (Leeds and Grenville United Counties)
- Atkins Lake (Rainy River District)
- Atkinson Lake
- Atlantic Lake
- Atom Lake
- Atomic Lake
- Attach Lake
- Attack Lake
- Attawapiskat Lake
- Attraction Lake
- Attwood Lake
- Atwood Lake

== Au ==
- Aubin Lake
- Aubrey Lake (Aubrey Township, Kenora District)
- Aubrey Lake (Algoma District)
- Aubrey Lake (Haliburton County)
- Aubrey Lake (Benedickson Township, Kenora District)
- Auden Lake
- Audette Lake
- Audrea Lake
- Audrey Lake (Fauquier-Strickland)
- Audrey Lake (Algoma District)
- Audrey Lake (Wacousta Township, Cochrane District)
- Auger Lake (Haliburton County)
- Auger Lake (Cochrane District)
- Auger Lake (Thunder Bay District)
- Augite Lake
- August Lake (Thunder Bay District)
- August Lake (Kenora District)
- Augusta Lake (Sudbury District)
- Augusta Lake (Thunder Bay District)
- Auld Lake (Sudbury District)
- Auld Lake (Timiskaming District)
- Ault Lake
- Aumond Lake
- Aura Lee Lake
- Aurel Lake
- Aurora Lake (Timiskaming District)
- Aurora Lake (Nipissing District)
- Austen Lake
- Austin Lake (Kenora)
- Austin Lake (Austin Creek, Kenora District)
- Austin Lake (Kehoe Township, Algoma District)
- Austin Lake (Corboy Township, Algoma District)
- Austin Lake (Sudbury District)
- Austin Lake (Haliburton County)
- Austins Lake

== Av–Az ==
- Ava Lake
- Avery Lake (Kenora District)
- Avery Lake (Haliburton County)
- Avery Lake (Sudbury District)
- Avery's Lake
- Avey Lake
- Avis Lake (Parry Sound District)
- Avis Lake (Kenora District)
- Avon Lake
- Awad Lake
- Awameg Lake
- Awkward Lake
- Awl Lake
- Awning Lake
- Axe Lake (McEwing Township, Algoma District)
- Axe Lake (Renfrew County)
- Axe Lake (Redditt Township, Kenora District)
- Axe Lake (Thunder Bay District)
- Axe Lake (Parry Sound District)
- Axe Lake (Sudbury District)
- Axe Lake (Gould Township, Algoma District)
- Axe Lake (Severn River, Kenora District)
- Axle Lake
- Axton Lake
- Ayah Lake
- Aylen Lake
- Aylsworth Lake
- A.Y. Jackson Lake
- Ayotte Lake
- Azadi Lake
- Azen Lake
- Azure Lake (Sudbury District)
- Azure Lake (Kenora District)
