= Aegean Lake =

Lake in Ontario, Canada

Aegean Lake is a lake in the Kenora District of Ontario, Canada. The lake forms part of a canoe route in Woodland Caribou Provincial Park.

== Recreation & Canoe Route ==
Aegean Lake forms part of a canoe route known as the Leano Lake Loop.

Aegean Lake
- Location within Ontario
- Location: Ontario
- Coordinates: 50.81°N 94.78°W

== Fish ==
The lake contains Lake trout, Lake whitefish and Northern pike.

== See also ==
List of lakes of Ontario
