= Moon Lake (Minnesota) =

Lake in the state of Minnesota, United States

- Location within Minnesota
- Location: Douglas County, Minnesota
- Coordinates: 45.9537122°N 95.5900495°W
- Type: lake

Moon Lake is a lake in Douglas County, Minnesota, in the United States.

Moon Lake was named from the resemblance of its outline to the crescent shape of the Moon.

== See also ==
- List of lakes in Minnesota
