= Snowshoe Lake (Montana) =

- Location within Montana
- Location: Montana, United States
- Coordinates: 48°13′46″N 115°42′51″W
- Type: Lake
- Part of: Rocky Mountains
- Basin countries: United States
- Surface elevation: 6,150 ft (1,870 m)

Snowshoe Lake is a small alpine lake located in the Cabinet Mountains in northwestern Montana. It is within the boundaries of Kaniksu National Forest. Snowshoe Peak overlooks the lake. Granite Lake and Leigh Lake are also located nearby.
