= Hansen Lake (Kenora District) =

- Location in Ontario
- Location: Kenora District, Ontario
- Coordinates: 50°55′34″N 94°42′03″W
- Type: lake
- Part of: Hudson Bay drainage basin
- River sources: Rostoul River, Domain Creek
- Primary outflows: Rostoul River
- Basin countries: Canada
- Max. length: 5.0 km (3.1 mi)
- Max. width: 3.9 km (2.4 mi)
- Surface elevation: 345 m (1,132 ft)

Hansen Lake is a lake in the Unorganized Part of Kenora District in Northwestern Ontario, Canada. It is in the Hudson Bay drainage basin, and is within Woodland Caribou Provincial Park.

The primary inflows are the Rostoul River, arriving at the southeast from Glenn Lake, and Domain Creek, at the northeast. The primary outflow, at the northwest and leading towards Rostoul Lake, is the Rostoul River, which flows via the Gammon River, the Bloodvein River, Lake Winnipeg, and the Nelson River to Hudson Bay.

== See also ==
- List of lakes in Ontario
