= Atikaki Provincial Wilderness Park =

Provincial park in Manitoba, Canada

- IUCN category II (national park)
- Location within Manitoba
- Location: Manitoba, Canada
- Nearest town: Bloodvein, Manitoba
- Coordinates: 51°30′0″N 95°31′0″W
- Area: 3,981 square kilometres (1,537 sq mi)
- Established: 1985
- Governing body: Government of Manitoba

Atikaki Provincial Park

Atikaki Provincial Park is a wilderness park in Manitoba, Canada, located east of Lake Winnipeg along the Ontario boundary in the Canadian Shield. The area of Atikaki Provincial Park is 3,981 square kilometres (1,537 sq mi). Atikaki Provincial Park is north of Nopiming Provincial Park and borders the Woodland Caribou Provincial Park in Ontario.

Atikaki Provincial Wilderness Park was designated a provincial park by the Government of Manitoba in 1985. The park is considered to be a Class II protected area under the IUCN protected area management categories. It became part of the Pimachiowin Aki UNESCO World Heritage Site in 2018.

== Geography ==
Most of the water of the park flows west to Lake Winnipeg. Although the vast majority of the park's land is located east of 95° 46' W, there are three very long thin corridors of parkland along streams that flow westward toward Lake Winnipeg. These streams are the Pigeon River, the Leyond River, and the Bloodvein River. The lakes and rivers are warmer than most rivers that are fed by cold mountain streams. The majority of the population north and east of the park are First Nations and the closest town is Bloodvein at the mouth of the Bloodvein River.

Atikaki is home to wildlife such as moose, elk, black bears, loons, bald eagles, woodland caribou, and other creatures of the boreal forest. It is known mostly for its beautiful waterways, and is a popular destination for more adventurous canoe trippers. Most popular are the Bloodvein River, Gammon River, and the Sasaginnigak River. There are several fly in fishing lodges in the area.

Atikaki Park was initially to become a National Park but ended up as a Provincial Park. The park was partially mapped out by Marc Wermager. No logging roads, logging areas, or major developments are allowed in the park.

== See also ==
- List of provincial parks in Manitoba
- List of protected areas of Manitoba
