= Moon Lake (Berrien County, Michigan) =

- Location within Michigan
- Location: Berrien County, Michigan
- Coordinates: 41°50′50″N 86°22′54″W
- Type: lake
- Surface area: 8.062 acres (3.263 ha)

Moon Lake is a lake in Berrien County, in the U.S. state of Michigan. It is 8.062 acres (3.263 ha) in size.

Moon Lake has the name of Zimri Moon, the original owner of the site.
