= Berenhap =

Deep-fried fast food snack

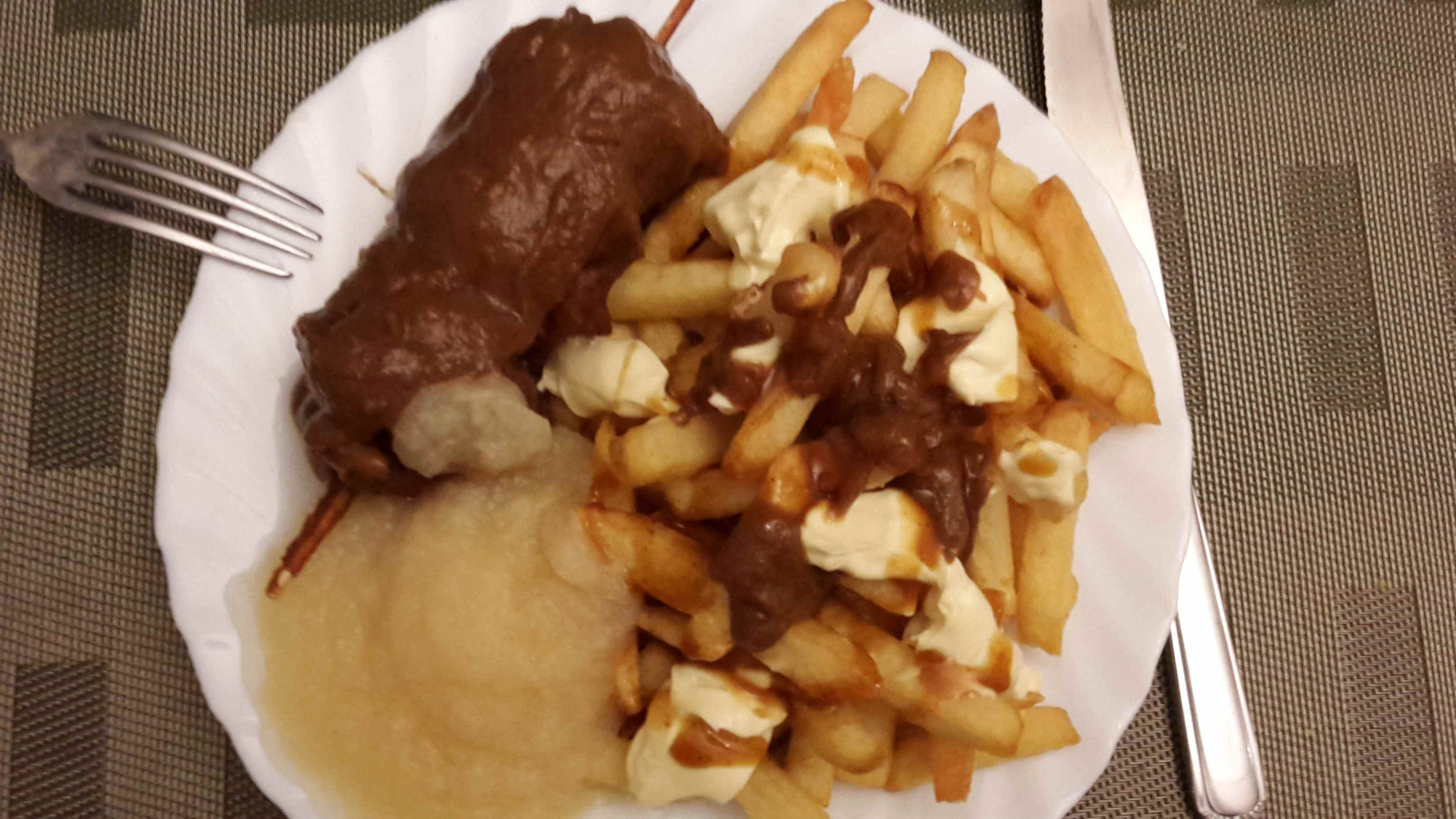
A meal with berenhap

A berenhap (Bear's bite in English) or spoetnik (Sputnik in English) is a deep-fried fast food snack from the Netherlands. It consists of a sliced meatball and fried onion rings on a wooden skewer, smothered in peanut sauce. The snack is also served with "Zigeunersaus" (literally translated: Gypsy-sauce), or a cold curry sauce should one not like peanut sauce. Sometimes, pineapple or bell pepper are used as well as onion rings.
