= Bear Claw Spire =

Mountain in the state of California

- Treasure Benchmark
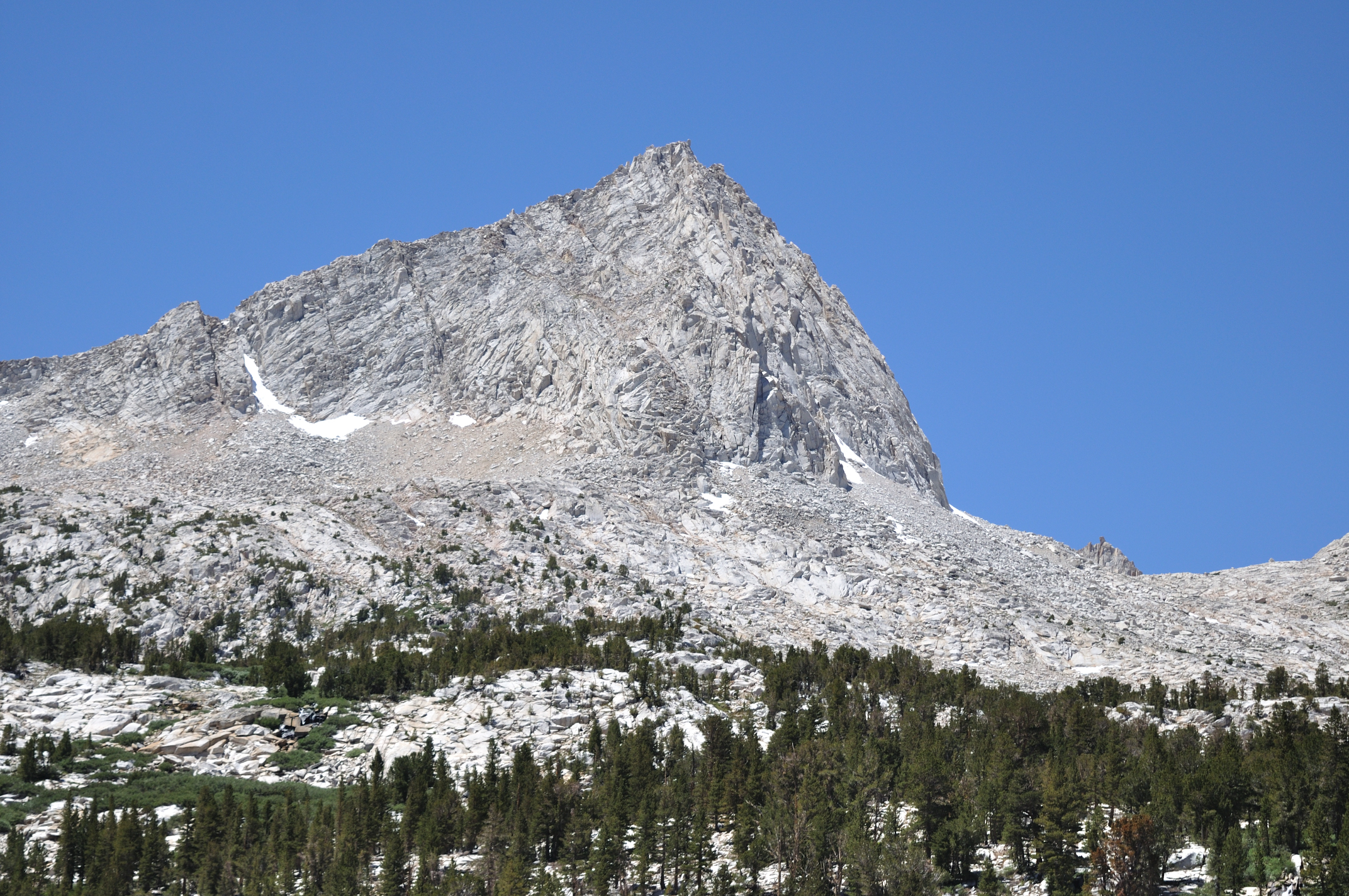
- Northeast aspect

Highest point
- Elevation: 12,578 ft (3,834 m)
- Prominence: 836 ft (255 m)
- Isolation: 1.06 mi (1.71 km)
- Coordinates: 37°19′45″N 118°45′27″W

Geography
- Location within California Location within the United States
- Interactive map of Bear Claw Spire
- Country: United States of America
- State: California
- County: Fresno / Inyo
- Protected area: John Muir Wilderness
- Parent range: Sierra Nevada
- Topo map: USGS Mount Hilgard

Geology
- Rock age: Mesozoic
- Mountain type: Fault block
- Rock type: Granite

Climbing
- First ascent: 1938 by Norman Clyde
- Easiest route: West slope class 3

Bear Claw Spire, also known as Treasure Benchmark, is a mountain in California, United States.

== Description ==
Bear Claw Spire is a 12,586-foot-elevation (3,836-meter) summit located in the John Muir Wilderness on the crest of the Sierra Nevada mountain range. It is situated on the common boundary shared by Fresno County with Inyo County, as well as the boundary that Sierra National Forest shares with Inyo National Forest. The peak is set 1.05 miles (1.69 km) northeast of Royce Peak, which is the nearest higher peak. Precipitation runoff from the peak drains northeast into Honeymoon Lake → Pine Creek → Owens River, as well as south to Royce Lakes and the San Joaquin River watershed. Topographic relief is significant as the summit rises 2,150 feet (655 meters) above Honeymoon Lake in one mile (1.6 km), and 860 feet (262 meters) above the largest of the Royce Lakes in 0.3 mile (0.48 km). The summit ranks as the 274th-highest peak in California. This landform's toponym has not been officially adopted by the U.S. Board on Geographic Names, so Bear Claw Spire, Treasure Benchmark, and Treasure Peak are commonly used names.

== Climbing ==
The first ascent of the summit was made in 1938 via the west slope by Norman Clyde, who is credited with 130 first ascents, most of which were in the Sierra Nevada.

Established climbing routes with first ascents on Bear Claw Spire:

- West Slope – class 3 – 1938 – Norman Clyde
- Northwest Face – class 5.7 – 1966 – Gary Colliver, Andy Lichtman, Mark Waller
- Northeast Ridge – class 5.6 – 1982 – Galen Rowell
- Treasure Hunt – class 5.9 – 2016 – Dave Nettle, Brandon Thau
- Treasure Iceland – class 5.4 – 2018 – Dane Steadman, Tyler Brillinski
- Fool's Gold – class 5.11 – 2023 – Brandon Adams, Cole Cunningham

== Climate ==
According to the Köppen climate classification system, Bear Claw Spire is located in an alpine climate zone. Weather fronts originating in the Pacific Ocean travel east toward the Sierra Nevada mountains. As fronts approach, they are forced upward by the peaks (orographic lift), causing them to drop their moisture in the form of rain or snowfall onto the range.

== Gallery ==
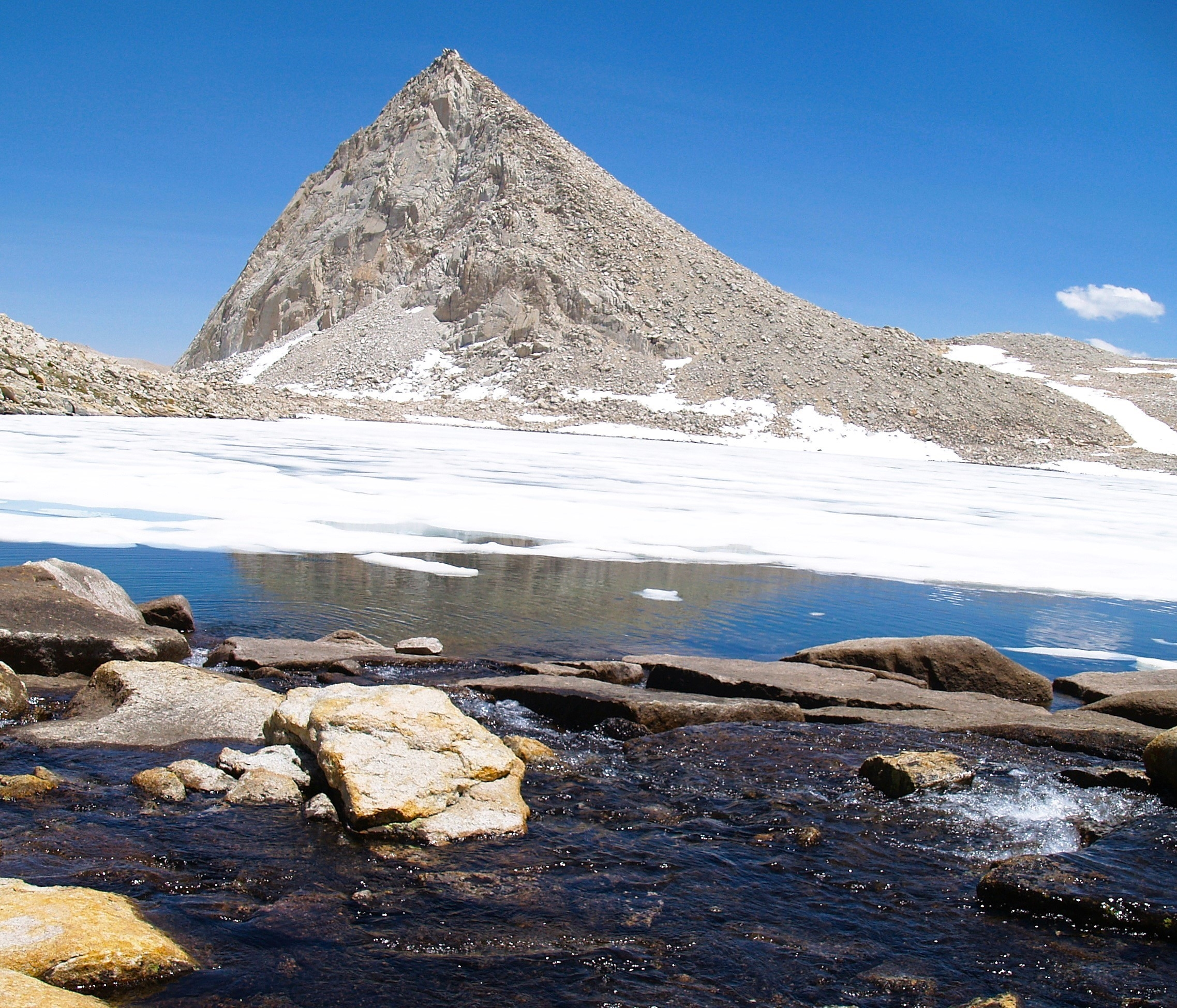
West aspect from Royce Lakes

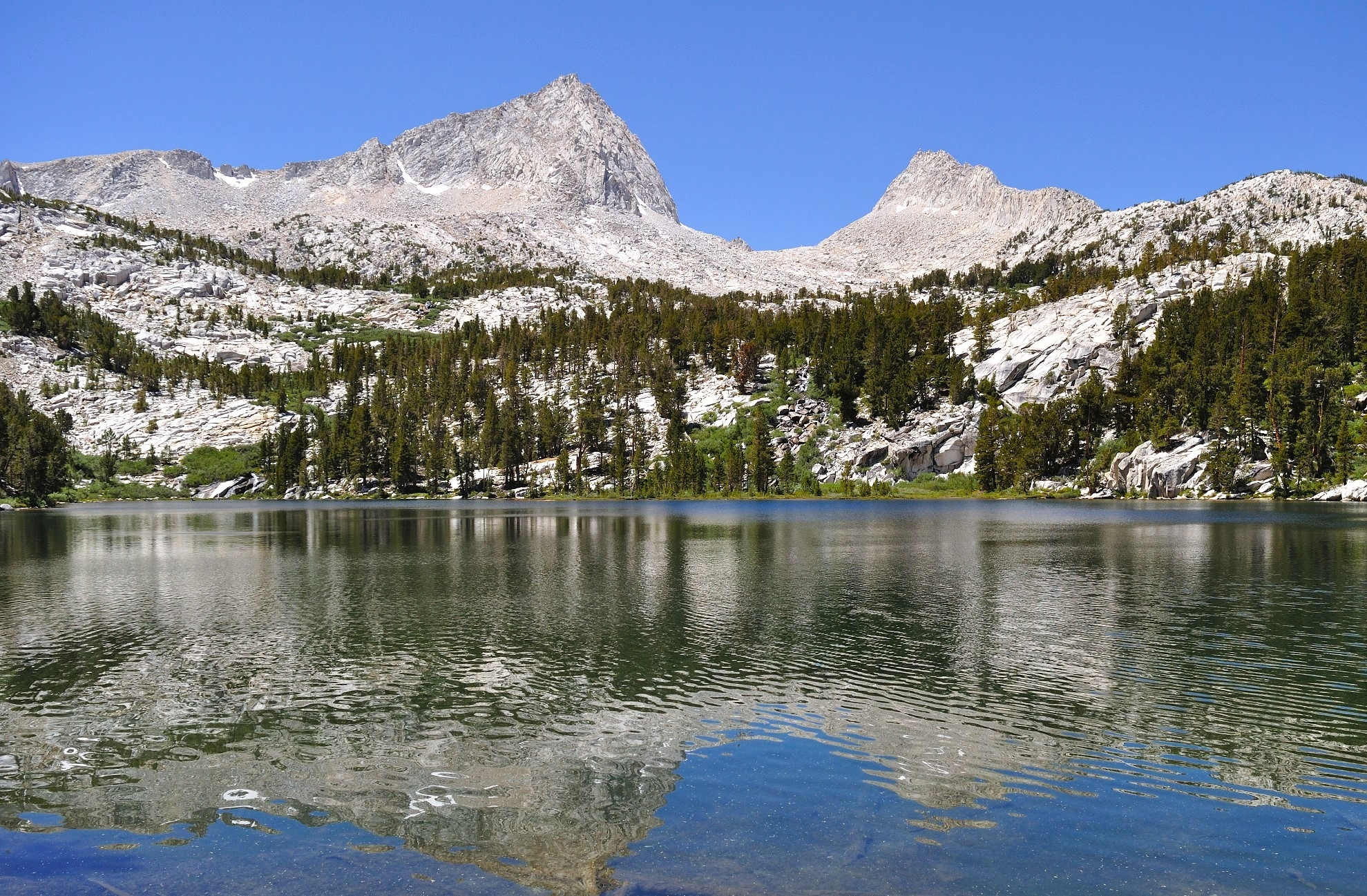
Bear Claw Spire (left) and Spire Peak (right) reflected in Honeymoon Lake

== See also ==
- List of mountain peaks of California
