= Bloodvein First Nation =

First Nations community

Coordinates: 51°46′37″N 96°41′42″W

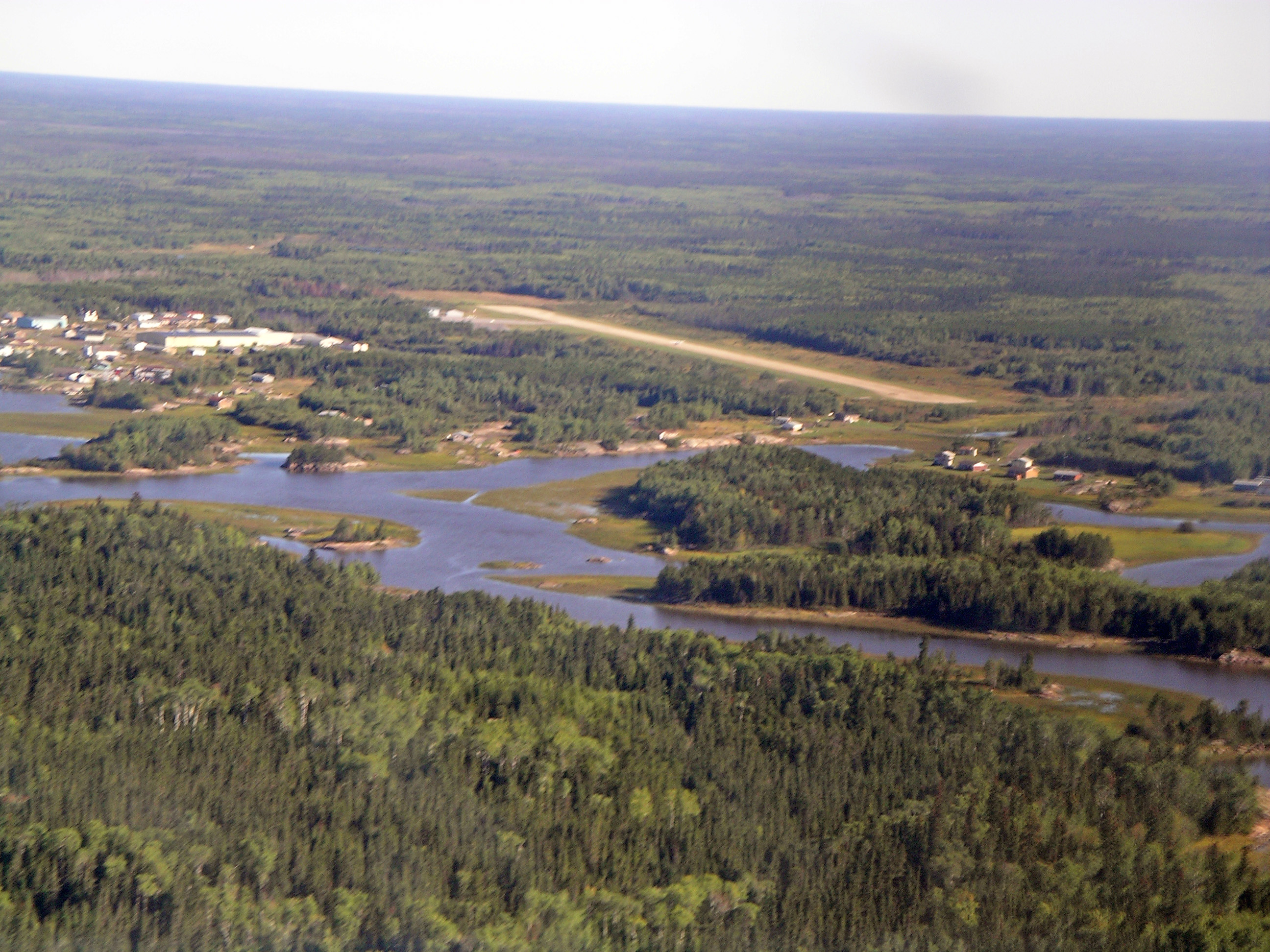
- Aerial view of Bloodvein
- People: Saulteaux
- Treaty: Treaty 5

Land
- Main reserve: Bloodvein 12
- Land area: 16.252 km^{2} (6.275 sq mi)

Population (2019)
- On reserve: 1,176
- Off reserve: 742
- Total population: 1,918

Government
- Chief: Lisa Young

Location of Bloodvein in Manitoba

The Bloodvein First Nation is a First Nations community located on the east side of Lake Winnipeg, along the Bloodvein River in Manitoba, Canada. As of 2019, the community had a population of 1,176.

There are many caribou, bears, wolves, bald eagles, lynx, owls, and various species of fish in the area. The river and surroundings is the traditional land use area for the Ojibwa (or Saulteaux) people. The area is served by Bloodvein River Airport.

== History ==
This area is a part of Treaty 5, and has long been inhabited by Indigenous peoples. The name Bloodvein was used in an 1818–19 Hudson's Bay Company journal. The name originates from a major battle between the tribe inhabiting the mouth of the river and one of the neighboring tribes, where blood flowed into the river. The river was originally called the "Blood River" but was changed to "Bloodvein" by the HBC.

During the 18th century, the Bloodvein River was used by Ojibwa peoples as a trapping area for the fur trade, and it was a fur transport route. The community of Bloodvein, near the river's mouth, is still inhabited by descendants of the Saulteaux-Ojibwa people, continuing the traditional native life of hunting, trapping, fishing and wild rice harvesting.

The Bloodvein River is located in one of the largest remaining intact boreal forest regions of the world. The Bloodvein River became Manitoba's first Canadian Heritage River in 1987 and much of the river is within Atikaki Provincial Park.

The river's historic features are the undisturbed archaeological sites which provide evidence of prehistoric, hunter-gatherer peoples in the area for thousands of years. There are pictographs (native rock paintings of red ochre) dating back to around 900 to 1200 AD.

== Demographics and location ==
As of March 2013, the First Nation had a total registered population of 1,673 with 1,042 members living on-reserve and 631 living off-reserve. The primary language spoken is Saulteaux.

The First Nation's reserve is called Bloodvein 12, which has an area of 3,885 acres. Bloodvein First Nation is a member of the Southeast Resource Development Council. and is governed by a Chief and four councilors.

During 2009 work started on upgrading the existing Rice River Road to Bloodvein and further extending it to Berens River. Work was completed in 2017.

== See also ==
- Aboriginal peoples in Manitoba
