= Hansen Lake (Sudbury District) =

- Location in Ontario
- Location: Sudbury District, Ontario
- Coordinates: 47°46′12″N 83°53′55″W
- Type: lake
- Part of: Great Lakes Basin
- Basin countries: Canada
- Max. length: 1,010 m (3,310 ft)
- Max. width: 390 m (1,280 ft)
- Surface elevation: 460 m (1,510 ft)

Hansen Lake is a lake in geographic Topham Township in the Unorganized North Part of Sudbury District in Northeastern Ontario, Canada. It is in the Great Lakes Basin.

The primary outflow is an unnamed creek at the south leading to Fergus Lake on the Prairie Bee River. The Prairie Bee River flows via the Windermere River, the Shikwamka River and the Michipicoten River to Lake Superior.
