= Bloodvein River =

River in Canada

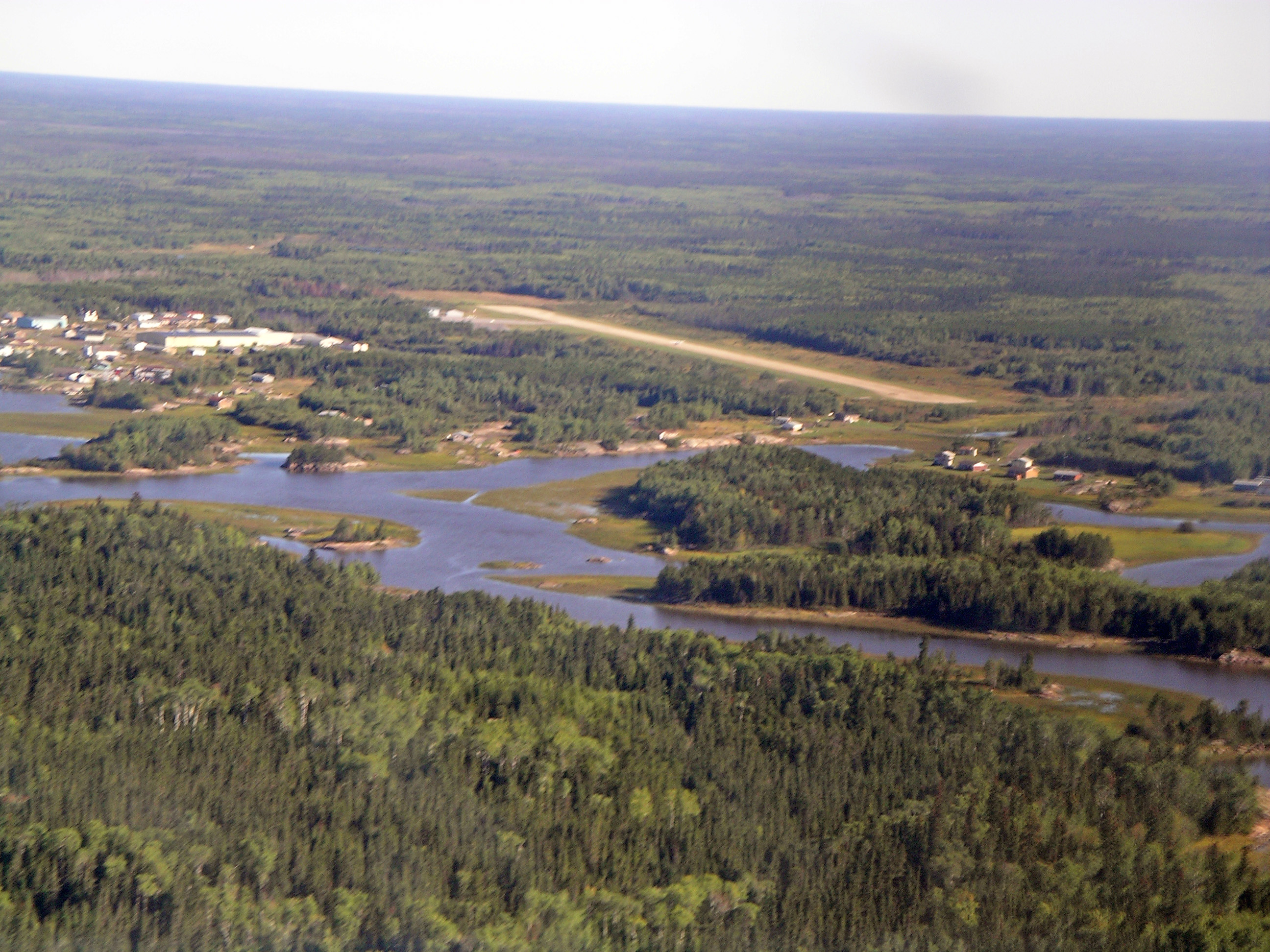
- Bloodvein River (near the mouth at Bloodvein)

- Location of the mouth of the Bloodvein River

Location
- Country: Canada
- Provinces: Manitoba; Ontario

Physical characteristics
- Source: near Peisk Lake
  - location: Ontario
  - coordinates: 51°12′03″N 94°22′49″W
  - elevation: 400 m (1,300 ft)
- Mouth: at Bloodvein First Nation
  - location: Lake Winnipeg, Manitoba
  - coordinates: 51°47′25″N 96°42′55″W
  - elevation: 217 m (712 ft)
- Length: 300 km (190 mi)

Basin features
- River system: Nelson River basin

The Bloodvein River is a river in Canada. It flows west from its headwaters in Red Lake in northwest Ontario to the east side of Lake Winnipeg in Manitoba through the boreal forests of the Canadian Shield. It is around 300 kilometres (190 mi) long. Lakes along its length include Knox Lake, Pipestone Lake and Artery Lake.

First Nation peoples have used the river for centuries, and their petroglyphs and rock paintings can be found on some shoreline cliffs. The river along with many other rivers on the east side of Lake Winnipeg is part of a unique wilderness area untouched by major developments such as logging roads, mines, or dams.

The Bloodvein River became Manitoba's first Canadian Heritage River in 1987. For most of its length, the river is within Atikaki Provincial Park in Manitoba and the Woodland Caribou Provincial Park in Ontario. It became part of the Pimachiowin Aki UNESCO World Heritage Site in 2018.

The First Nation community of Bloodvein situated at the mouth is the only major community along the river. The community is served by the Bloodvein River Airport.

From 1980 to 2015, Bloodvein was only accessible by the HMV Edgar Wood Ferry during warm months. The ferry operated for 35 years until it was cancelled in 2015, due to decreased usage after the completion of a road allowing access to Bloodvein.

== Fish species ==
Northern pike, walleye, channel catfish, whitefish, lake trout, sturgeon (catch and release only), chestnut lamprey

== See also ==
- List of rivers of Manitoba
- List of rivers of Ontario
