= Woodland Caribou Provincial Park =

Provincial park in Ontario, Canada

- IUCN category Ib (wilderness area)
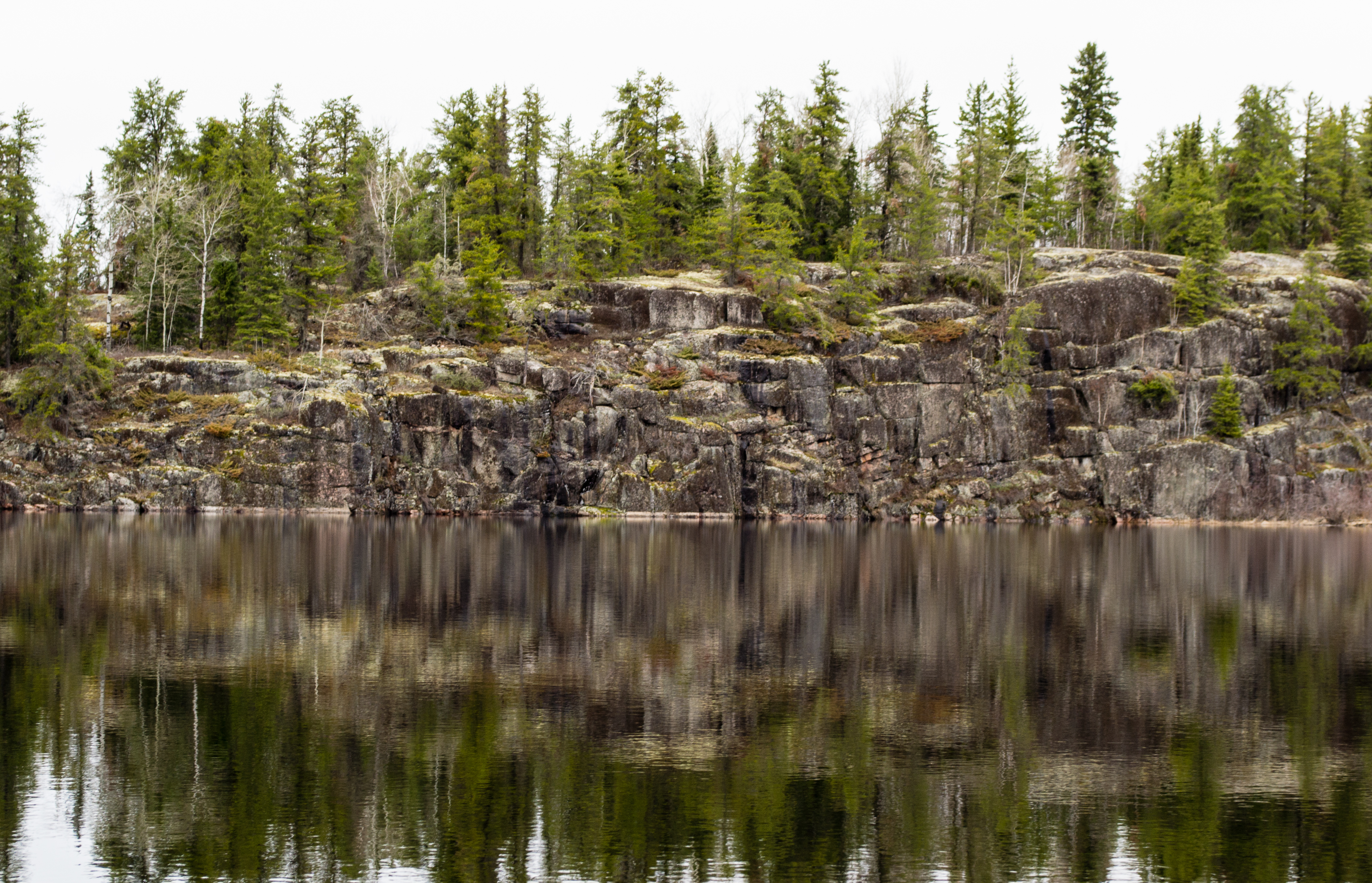
- Rock wall

- Location within Ontario
- Interactive map of Woodland Caribou Provincial Park
- Location: Kenora District, Ontario, Canada
- Nearest city: Red Lake
- Coordinates: 50°59′55″N 94°45′01″W
- Area: 4,500 km^{2} (1,700 sq mi)
- Established: 1983
- Visitors: 1,831 (in 2022)
- Governing body: Ontario Parks
- World Heritage site: 2018

Woodland Caribou Provincial Park is a provincial park in Northwestern Ontario, Canada, west of the municipality of Red Lake. It borders Atikaki Provincial Park and Nopiming Provincial Park in eastern Manitoba, and is made up of Canadian Shield and boreal forest. Woodland Caribou Provincial Park is a wilderness park of 450,000 hectares (1,100,000 acres), and it became part of the Pimachiowin Aki UNESCO World Heritage Site in 2018.

Access to the park is via float plane or canoe. The park is noted as a wilderness canoe destination, with over 2,000 kilometres (1,200 mi) of waterways that weave a pattern between large interconnected lakes and rivers, including the Bloodvein River and the Gammon River. Portages connect many of the common canoe routes. The park has many archaeological sites containing many Ojibway pictographs.

== See also ==
- List of Ontario parks
