= Manitoba Provincial Road 304 =

Provincial road in Manitoba, Canada

Provincial Road 304
- PR 304 highlighted in red

Route information
- Maintained by Department of Infrastructure
- Length: 192 km (119 mi)
- Existed: 1966–present

Major junctions
- North end: PR 314 near Bissett
- PTH 11 at Powerview-Pine Falls; East Side Road near Wanipigow
- South end: PTH 59 / PTH 12 / PR 500 near Beaconia

Location
- Country: Canada
- Province: Manitoba
- Rural municipalities: Alexander
- Towns: Powerview-Pine Falls

Highway system
- Provincial highways in Manitoba; Winnipeg City Routes
← PR 303	→ PR 305

Provincial Road 304 (PR 304) is a provincial road in the Eastman and NorMan regions of Manitoba, Canada. It begins at PTH 59/PTH 12 south of Grand Beach and runs to Powerview-Pine Falls at the PTH 11 junction. Near the town, PR 304 crosses the Winnipeg River at the Pine Falls Generating Station, operated by Manitoba Hydro. From there, PR 304 heads north and then east to the community of Bissett, before terminating at Provincial Road 314 near the northern boundary of Nopiming Provincial Park.

Provincial Roads 304, 313, 314, and 315, along with PTH 11, form a loop that provides access to several remote communities, First Nations reserves, and provincial parks on the eastern side of Lake Winnipeg. PR 304 is also used as a south terminus for winter roads to northern Manitoba.

== History ==
Provincial Road 219
- Stead Road, Bouvier Trail
- Location: Gull Lake - St. Georges - Powerview-Pine Falls
- Length: 40.1 km (24.9 mi)
- Existed: 1966–1977

Provincial Road 219 (PR 219) was a 40.1-kilometre-long (24.9 mi) east–west highway in the Rural Municipalities of St. Clements and Alexander, connecting the towns of Gull Lake, Stead, and St. Georges.

Established in 1966, it ran from PTH 59 at Gull Lake, crossing PTH 12 before making a couple of sharp turns as it passed through Stead. It then wound its way through remote woodlands for several kilometres before coming to an end at PTH 11 in St. Georges. By 1976, the highway's eastern terminus was moved from St. Georges to Powerview-Pine Falls, meeting the southern end of PR 304, with the old route becoming Bouvier Trail. By 1978, the entire highway was renumbered to a southern extension of PR 304.

== Major intersections ==
Division	Location	km	mi	Destinations	Notes
St. Clements /Alexander boundary		0.0	0.0	PTH 12 / PTH 59 – Winnipeg, Grand Beach; PR 500 north – Beaconia	Southern terminus; southern terminus of PR 500; road continues as PR 500
Alexander	Belair Provincial Forest	6.8	4.2	Road 44E – Stead	
Alexander		19.0	11.8	Stead Road	Former PR 304 south
Alexander	Brightstone Sand Hills Provincial Forest	31.3	19.4	Bouvier Trail – St. Georges	Former PR 219 east
Town of Powerview-Pine Falls		34.6	21.5	PTH 11 – Victoria Beach, Lac du Bonnet	
Town of Powerview-Pine Falls		35.3– 35.7	21.9– 22.2	Pine Falls Generating Station across the Winnipeg River	
No. 19		65.2	40.5	Bridge over the O'Hanly River	
No. 19		69.3	43.1	Little Black River	Access road into First Nation
No. 19		74.9	46.5	Bridge over the Black River	
No. 19		88.7	55.1	Bridge over the Sandy River	
No. 19	Manigotagan / Manigotagan River Provincial Park boundary	104.6	65.0	Bridge over the Manigotagan River	
No. 19	Manigotagan	104.8	65.1	Manigotagan	Access road; Pavement ends
No. 19		106.5	66.2	Seymourville, Wanipigow	Access road
No. 19		113.2	70.3	East Side Road – Bloodvein, Berens River	Southern terminus of East Side Road; formerly known as Rice River Road; also provides access to winter roads leading to Little Grand Rapids, St. Theresa Point, and Poplar River
No. 19		127.5	79.2	Wanipigow Lake	Access road
No. 19		174.4	108.4	Wallace Lake Provincial Park	Access road
No. 19	Nopiming Provincial Park	192.0	119.3	PR 314 south – Lac du Bonnet; Access road to Long Lake	Northern terminus of both PR 304 and PR 314; access road to lake
1.000 mi = 1.609 km; 1.000 km = 0.621 mi
