= Boot (disambiguation) =

A boot is a type of footwear.

Boot(s) may also refer to:

== Businesses ==
- Boot Inn, Chester, Cheshire, England
- Boots (company), a high-street pharmacy chain and manufacturer of pharmaceuticals in the United Kingdom
- The Boot, Cromer Street, a pub in King's Cross, London

== Places ==
- Boot, Cumbria, a small village in Eskdale, Cumbria, England
- Boot Key, an island in the Florida Keys
- Boot Lake (disambiguation)
- Boot Pond (Plymouth, Massachusetts)
- Boot Rock, South Sandwich Islands
- Boots Creek (Manitoba), Canada
- "The Boot", an informal name for Italy, due to the country's shape

== People with the name ==
- Boot (surname), a list of people surnamed either Boot or Boots
- Boots (nickname), a list of people with the nickname
- Boots (musician), an American record producer
- Gypsy Boots (1914–2004), also known as Boots Bootzin, American fitness pioneer, actor and writer born Robert Bootzin
- Little Boots, English electropop singer-songwriter and DJ

== Arts, entertainment, and media ==
=== Fictional characters ===
- Boot, an Old English Sheepdog in The Perishers, a British cartoon strip
- Terry Boot, a member of Dumbledore's Army in the Harry Potter series
- William Boot, the fictional protagonist of the Evelyn Waugh novel Scoop
- Boots, a tiger who sang and played guitar in the ITV children's series Animal Kwackers
- Boots, the title character of the American comic strip Boots and Her Buddies, shortened by some newspapers as Boots
- Boots, the hero of the Norwegian fairy tale "Boots and the Troll"
- Boots, a monkey on the television series Dora the Explorer
- Boots Malone, the title character of the film Boots Malone
- Melvin "Boots" O'Neal, a main character in the Bruno and Boots children's novel series

=== Films ===
- Boots (film), a 1919 American silent film starring Dorothy Gish and Richard Barthelmess
- Das Boot ("The Boat"), a 1981 German movie by Wolfgang Petersen based on the Lothar-Günther Buchheim novel of the same name

=== TV shows ===
- Boots (TV series), a 2025 Netflix LGBT military drama television series starring Miles Heizer and Max Parker

=== Music ===
==== Labels ====
- Boot Records, a former Canadian country, bluegrass and contemporary folk label formed in 1971

==== Albums and EPs ====
- Boots (album), a 1966 album by Nancy Sinatra
- "Boots" (EP), a 2002 EP by industrial music band KMFDM with a cover of the Nancy Sinatra song
- Boot!, a 2013 album by The Thing
- Boots, a 2002 album by Noe Venable

==== Songs ====
- "Boots" (song), a 2010 song by The Killers
- "Boots", a 1928 song composed by Peter Dawson aka "J.P. McCall"
- "Boots", a song by Mighty Gabby
- "Boots", a song by Kesha from her 2017 album Rainbow
- "Boots", a song by Hardy from his 2020 album A Rock
- "Boot" (ブート Būto), a song by Macintosh Plus from Floral Shoppe
- "Das Boot" (song), title theme of the film of the same name
- "The Boots", a song by Gugudan

=== Other uses in arts, entertainment, and media ===
- Boot (magazine), an American computer magazine now known as Maximum PC
- "Boots" (poem), by Rudyard Kipling (1903)
- "Boots", an episode of the television series Teletubbies
- Bootleg recording, unauthorized audio or video recording, often abbreviated to "boot"
- The Boot (website), a music blog owned by Townsquare Media

== Computing ==
- Boot (software), a Clojure build automation tool
- /boot/ directory, a protected Unix directory used in the boot process
- Booting, the initial set of operations that a computer system performs when turned on
- Ping-Pong virus, alternatively called "boot"

== Roles or professions ==
- Boot, a recruit undergoing recruit training in the United States Marine Corps or Navy, or an inexperienced marine or sailor
- Boot or boots, a servant who acts as a shoeshiner, especially in a hotel

== Transportation ==
- Boot (car), the storage compartment of a car
- Boot, a built-in compartment on a horse-drawn coach, used originally as a seat for the coachman and later for storage
- Deicing boot, a device installed on aircraft surfaces to help prevent icing problems
- Denver boot, also known as a wheel clamp, which can be attached to a vehicle to prevent its movement

== Other uses ==
- Boot (medical), a protective device worn while an injured foot is healing
- Boot (real estate), any property received by a taxpayer in an IRC 1031 exchange which is not like-kind to the relinquished property
- Boot (torture), a torture device for crushing the human foot
- Boot of beer, a form of beer glassware in the shape of a boot
- Build-Operate-Own-Transfer, an arrangement for funding projects
- Cylinder boot, a rubber protector for the bottom end of a scuba cylinder
- boot Düsseldorf, an annual boat show in Düsseldorf, Germany
- Boot, Old English for estover, an English law term
- Boot, the outer shell of a reed pipe in a pipe organ

== See also ==
- Bhoot (disambiguation)
- "Booted" (song), a 1952 R&B song by Roscoe Gordon
- Boötes, a constellation of stars
- "Boots, Boots, Boots", an episode of the British TV series Dad's Army
- Boots! Boots!, a 1934 British comedy film
- Caligula (12–41), nickname (Latin for "little [soldier's] boot") of Roman emperor Gaius Julius Caesar Augustus Germanicus
