= Boot Lake =

Boot Lake may refer to the following bodies of water:

- Boot Lake (Anoka County, Minnesota)
- Boot Lake (Cass County, Minnesota)
- Boot Lake (Lake County, Minnesota)
- Boot Lake (Nova Scotia)

== See also ==
- Little Boot Lake
