= Minnesota Scientific and Natural Areas =

Protected area designation in United States

Blue Devil Valley in Yellow Medicine County, Minnesota

Minnesota Scientific and Natural Areas (SNAs) are public lands in the state of Minnesota that have been permanently protected to preserve any one or combination of the following:

- Native plant and animal communities
- Rare species
- Places of biodiversity significance
- Geological features or formations
- Seasonal havens for wildlife and vantage points for observing them
- Successional processes
- Relict flora or fauna
- Fossil evidence

The SNA Program is housed within the Division of Ecological and Water Resources at the Minnesota Department of Natural Resources. The primary goal of the program is to ensure that none of Minnesota's natural heritage is lost from any ecological region of the state. The secondary goal is to provide opportunities for compatible scientific research, education, and nature-based recreation. The Program currently oversees 166 SNAs.

SNA Name	Hours/Closures	Locale	Ecological Classification System
Agassiz Dunes	All seasons, 24/7	Fertile	Red River Prairie
Antelope Valley	All seasons, 24/7	Wergeland Township	Minnesota River Prairie
Avon Hills Forest	All seasons, 24/7	Avon	Hardwood Hills
Badoura Jack Pine Woodland	All seasons, 24/7	Badoura	Pine Moraines & Outwash Plains
Bald Eagle Bluff	All seasons, 24/7	Lake City	The Blufflands
Big Island	All seasons, 24/7	Orr	Border Lakes
Black Lake Bog	All seasons, 24/7	Bruno Township	Mille Lacs Uplands
Blaine Airport Rich Fen	Due to airport security, site open by permit only.	Blaine	Anoka Sand Plain
Blaine Preserve	All seasons, 24/7	Circle Pines	Anoka Sand Plain
Blanket Flower Prairie	All seasons, 24/7	Pelican Rapids	Hardwood Hills
Blue Devil Valley	All seasons, 24/7	Granite Falls	Minnesota River Prairie
Bluestem Prairie	All seasons, 24/7	Glyndon	Red River Prairie
Boltuck-Rice Forever Wild	All seasons, 24/7	Cohasset	St. Louis Moraines
Bonanza Prairie	All seasons, 24/7	Beardsley	Minnesota River Prairie
Boot Lake	All seasons, 24/7	Wyoming	Anoka Sand Plain
Botany Bog	All seasons, 24/7	Grand Rapids	St. Louis Moraines
Brownsville Bluff	Sanctuary portion closed	Houston County	The Blufflands
Bruce Hitman Heron Rookery	Closed April 1 through July 15 to protect rare bird breeding areas.	Glenwood	Minnesota River Prairie
Burntside Islands	All seasons, 24/7	Ely	Border Lakes
Butternut Valley Prairie	All seasons, 24/7	Madelia	Minnesota River Prairie
Butterwort Cliffs	Closed April 1 through July 15 to protect rare bird breeding areas.	Grand Marais	North Shore Highlands
Caldwell Brook Cedar Swamp	All seasons, 24/7	Northome	Littlefork–Vermilion Uplands
Cannon River Trout Lily	All seasons, 24/7	Faribault	Big Woods
Cannon River Turtle Preserve	Closed May 1 through October 15 to protect turtle breeding areas.	Red Wing	The Blufflands
Cedar Mountain	All seasons, 24/7	Franklin	Minnesota River Prairie
Cedar Rock	All seasons, 24/7	Redwood Falls	Minnesota River Prairie
Chamberlain Woods	All seasons, 24/7	Le Sueur	Big Woods
Cherry Grove Blind Valley	All seasons, 24/7	Spring Valley	Rochester Plateau
Chimney Rock	All seasons, 24/7	Hastings	Rochester Plateau
Chisholm Point Island	All seasons, 24/7	Cohasset	St. Louis Moraines
Clear Lake	All seasons, 24/7	Clear Lake	Anoka Sand Plain
Clinton Falls Dwarf Trout Lily	All seasons, 24/7	Medford	Oak Savanna
Clinton Prairie	All seasons, 24/7	Graceville Township	Minnesota River Prairie
Cold Spring Heron Colony	All seasons, 24/7	Cold Spring	Hardwood Hills
Compass Prairie	All seasons, 24/7	Rushmore	Coteau Moraines
Cottonwood River Prairie	All seasons, 24/7	North Star Township	Minnesota River Prairie
Crystal Spring		Washington County	St. Paul–Baldwin Plains and Moraines
Des Moines River	All seasons, 24/7	Windom	Coteau Moraines
Eagle's Nest Island No. 4	All seasons, 24/7	Ely	Border Lakes
East Rat Root River Peatland	All seasons, 24/7	Kabetogama	Littlefork–Vermilion Uplands
Egret Island	Closed April 1 through July 15 to protect rare bird breeding areas.	Ashby	Minnesota River Prairie
Englund Ecotone	All seasons, 24/7	Rice	Anoka Sand Plain
Falls Creek	All seasons, 24/7	Scandia	St. Paul–Baldwin Plains and Moraines
Felton Prairie	All seasons, 24/7	Felton	Red River Prairie
Franconia Bluffs	All seasons, 24/7	Shafer	Mille Lacs Uplands
Frenchman's Bluff	All seasons, 24/7	Twin Valley	Red River Prairie
Glynn Prairie	All seasons, 24/7	Windom	Coteau Moraines
Gneiss Outcrops	All seasons, 24/7	Granite Falls	Minnesota River Prairie
Greenwater Lake	All seasons, 24/7	Detroit Lakes	Pine Moraines & Outwash Plains
Grey Cloud Dunes	All seasons, 24/7	Cottage Grove	St. Paul–Baldwin Plains and Moraines
Gully Fen	All seasons, 24/7	Gully	Aspen Parklands
Gustafson's Camp	All seasons, 24/7	Baudette	Agassiz Lowlands
Harry W. Cater Homestead Prairie	All seasons, 24/7	St. Cloud	Anoka Sand Plain
Hastings	All seasons, 24/7	Hastings	The Blufflands
Hastings Sand Coulee	All seasons, 24/7	Hastings	Oak Savanna
Helen Allison Savanna	All seasons, 24/7	East Bethel	Anoka Sand Plain
Hemlock Ravine	Sanctuary portion closed to protect rare resources.	Esko	North Shore Highlands
Hole in the Bog Peatland	All seasons, 24/7	Bena	Chippewa Plains
Holthe Prairie	All seasons, 24/7	Jackson	Coteau Moraines
Hovland Woods	All seasons, 24/7	East Cook	Border Lakes
Hythecker Prairie	All seasons, 24/7	Claremont	Oak Savanna
Iona's Beach	All seasons, 24/7	Two Harbors	North Shore Highlands
Iron Horse Prairie	All seasons, 24/7	Hayfield	Oak Savanna
Iron Springs Bog	All seasons, 24/7	Shelvin	Chippewa Plains
Itasca Wilderness Sanctuary	All seasons, 24/7	Park Rapids	Pine Moraines & Outwash Plains
Joseph A. Tauer Prairie	All seasons, 24/7	New Ulm	Minnesota River Prairie
Kasota Prairie	All seasons, 24/7	Kasota	Big Woods
Kawishiwi Pines	All seasons, 24/7	Ely	Border Lakes
Kellogg–Weaver Dunes	All seasons, 24/7	Kellogg	The Blufflands
Kettle River	All seasons, 24/7	Hinckley	Mille Lacs Uplands
King's and Queen's Bluff	King's Bluff is open to the public. Queen's Bluff is open by permit only.	Winona	The Blufflands
La Salle Lake	All seasons, 24/7	Solway	Chippewa Plains
Ladies Tresses Swamp	All seasons, 24/7	Cook	St. Louis Moraines
Lake Alexander Woods	All seasons, 24/7	Cushing	Pine Moraines & Outwash Plains
Lake Bronson Parkland	All seasons, 24/7	Halma	Aspen Parklands
Langhei Prairie	All seasons, 24/7	Benson	Minnesota River Prairie
Lawrence Creek		Hubbard County	Mille Lacs Uplands
Lester Lake		Chisago County	Pine Moraines & Outwash Plains
Little Too Much Lake	All seasons, 24/7	Bigfork	Chippewa Plains
Lost 40	All seasons, 24/7	Northome	Chippewa Plains
Lost Lake Peatland	All seasons, 24/7	Cook	Littlefork–Vermilion Uplands
Lost River Peatland	All seasons, 24/7	Big Falls	Agassiz Lowlands
Lost Valley Prairie	All seasons, 24/7	Hastings	St. Paul–Baldwin Plains and Moraines
Lundblad Prairie	All seasons, 24/7	Slayton	Coteau Moraines
Lutsen	All seasons, 24/7	Lutsen	North Shore Highlands
Luxemberg Peatland	All seasons, 24/7	Warroad	Agassiz Lowlands
Malmberg Prairie	All seasons, 24/7	Fisher	Red River Prairie
Mary Schmidt Crawford Woods	All seasons, 24/7	Buffalo	Big Woods
McGregor Marsh	All seasons, 24/7	McGregor	Tamarack Lowlands
Minnesota Point Pine Forest	All seasons, 24/7	Duluth	North Shore Highlands
Mille Lacs Moraine	All seasons, 24/7	Garrison	Mille Lacs Uplands
Mississippi River Islands	All seasons, 24/7	Monticello	Anoka Sand Plain
Moose Mountain	All seasons, 24/7	Duluth	North Shore Highlands
Morton Outcrops	All seasons, 24/7	Morton	Minnesota River Prairie
Mound Prairie	All seasons, 24/7	Houston	The Blufflands
Mound Spring Prairie	All seasons, 24/7	Canby	Coteau Moraines
Mulligan Lake Peatland	All seasons, 24/7	Grygia	Agassiz Lowlands
Myhr Creek Ridge	All seasons, 24/7	Grand Marais	North Shore Highlands
Myrtle Lake Peatland	All seasons, 24/7	Littlefork	Littlefork–Vermilion Uplands
Nett Lake Peatland	All seasons, 24/7	Orr	Litttlefork–Vermilion Uplands
Norris Camp Peatland	All seasons, 24/7	Forest Area Township	Agassiz Lowlands
North Black River Peatland	All seasons, 24/7	Northwest Koochiching	Agassiz Lowlands
North Fork Zumbro Woods	All seasons, 24/7	Wanamingo	Rochester Plateau
Oronoco Prairie	All seasons, 24/7	Oronoco	Rochester Plateau
Osmundson Prairie		Faribault County	Minnesota River Prairie
Otter Tail Prairie	All seasons, 24/7	Campbell	Red River Prairie
Partch Woods	All seasons, 24/7	Avon	Hardwood Hills
Pembina Trail	All seasons, 24/7	Crookston	Aspen Parklands
Pennington Bog	Open by permit only.	Pennington	Chippewa Plains
Pig's Eye Island Heron Rookery	Closed April 1 through July 15 to protect rare bird breeding areas.	St. Paul	St. Paul–Baldwin Plains and Moraines
Pin Oak Prairie	All seasons, 24/7	Chatfield	The Blufflands
Pine and Curry Island	Closed April 1 through July 15 to protect rare bird breeding areas.	Baudette	Agassiz Lowlands
Pine Bend Bluffs	All seasons, 24/7	Inver Grove Heights	St. Paul–Baldwin Plains and Moraines
Pine Creek Peatland	All seasons, 24/7	Roseau	Agassiz Lowlands
Potato Lake	All seasons, 24/7	Effie	Littlefork–Vermilion Uplands
Prairie Bush Clover	All seasons, 24/7	Lakefield	Coteau Moraines
Prairie Coteau	All seasons, 24/7	Holland	Inner Coteau
Prairie Creek Woods	All seasons, 24/7	Nerstrand	Oak Savanna
Prairie Smoke Dunes	All seasons, 24/7	Fertile	Red River Prairie
Purvis Lake–Ober Foundation	All seasons, 24/7	Ely	Border Lakes
Quarry Park	All seasons, 24/7	Waite Park	Anoka Sand Plain
Racine Prairie	All seasons, 24/7	Racine	Rochester Plateau
Red Lake Peatland	All seasons, 24/7	Waskish	Agassiz Lowlands
Rice Lake Savanna	All seasons, 24/7	Clear Lake Township	Anoka Sand Plain
Richard M. and Mathilde Rice Elliot	All seasons, 24/7	Barnesville	Red River Prairie
Ripley Esker	All seasons, 24/7	Fort Ripley Township	Mille Lacs Uplands
River Terrace Prairie	All seasons, 24/7	Cannon Falls	The Blufflands
River Warren Outcrops		Renville County	Minnesota River Prairie
Rock Ridge Prairie	All seasons, 24/7	Comfrey	Minnesota River Prairie
Roscoe Prairie	All seasons, 24/7	Paynesville	Minnesota River Prairie
Rush Lake Island	Closed April 1 through July 15 to protect rare bird breeding areas.	Stanchfield	Mille Lacs Uplands
Rushford Sand Barrens	All seasons, 24/7	Peterson	The Blufflands
Sand Lake Peatland	All seasons, 24/7	Isabella	Laurentian Uplands
Sandpiper Prairie	All seasons, 24/7	Twin Valley	Red River Prairie
Santee Prairie	All seasons, 24/7	Mahnomen	Red River Prairie
Savage Fen	All seasons, 24/7	Savage	Big Woods
Sedan Brook Prairie	All seasons, 24/7	Brooten	Minnesota River Prairie
Seminary Fen	All seasons, 24/7	Chaska	Big Woods
Shooting Star Prairie	All seasons, 24/7	Le Roy	Oak Savanna
South Black River Peatland	All seasons, 24/7	Big Falls	Agassiz Lowlands
Sprague Creek Peatland	All seasons, 24/7	Roseau	Agassiz Lowlands
Spring Beauty Northern Hardwoods	All seasons, 24/7	East Cook	North Shore Highlands
Spring Creek Prairie	All seasons, 24/7	Red Wing	The Blufflands
St. Croix Savanna	All seasons, 24/7	Bayport	St. Paul–Baldwin Plains and Moraines
St. Wendel Tamarack Bog	All seasons, 24/7	St. Joseph	Hardwood Hills
Sugarloaf Point	All seasons, 24/7	Schroder	North Shore Highlands
Swedes Forest	All seasons, 24/7	Belview	Minnesota River Prairie
Townsend Woods	All seasons, 24/7	Waterville	Big Woods
Twin Lakes	All seasons, 24/7	Stacy	Anoka Sand Plain
Twin Valley Prairie	All seasons, 24/7	Borup	Red River Prairie
Two Rivers Aspen Parkland	All seasons, 24/7	Greenbush	Aspen Parklands
Uncas Dunes	All seasons, 24/7	Big Lake	Anoka Sand Plain
Verlyn Marth Memorial Prairie	All seasons, 24/7	Herman	Minnesota River Prairie
Wabu Woods	All seasons, 24/7	Deer River Township	St. Louis Moraines
Watrous Island		Koochiching County	Agassiz Lowlands
Wawina Peatland	All seasons, 24/7	Floodwood	Tamarack Lowlands
West Rat Root River Peatland	All seasons, 24/7	International Falls	Littlefork–Vermilion Uplands
Western Prairie	All seasons, 24/7	Rothsay	Red River Prairie
Whitney Island	All seasons, 24/7	Faribault	Big Woods
Wild Indigo Prairie	All seasons, 24/7	Austin	Oak Savanna
Winter Road Lake Peatland	All seasons, 24/7	Roosevelt	Agassiz Lowlands
Wolsfeld Woods	All seasons, 24/7	Long Lake	Big Woods
Wood–Rill	All seasons, 24/7	Wayzata	Big Woods
Wykoff Balsam Fir	All seasons, 24/7	Spring Valley	The Blufflands
Yellow Bank Hills	All seasons, 24/7	Marietta	Minnesota River Prairie
Zumbro Falls Woods	All seasons, 24/7	Zumbro Falls	The Blufflands

== See also ==
- Geology of Minnesota
- List of ecoregions in Minnesota
- Natural history of Minnesota
- Wisconsin State Natural Areas Program, a similar program in Wisconsin.
