= Manitoba Provincial Road 313 =

Provincial road in Manitoba, Canada

Provincial Road 313
- PR 313 highlighted in red

Route information
- Maintained by Department of Infrastructure
- Length: 40 km (25 mi)
- Existed: 1966–present

Major junctions
- West end: PTH 11 near Lac du Bonnet
- PR 520 near Pinawa Dam Provincial Park; PR 315 at Pinawa Bay
- East end: Pointe du Bois

Location
- Country: Canada
- Province: Manitoba
- Rural municipalities: Alexander; Lac du Bonnet

Highway system
- Provincial highways in Manitoba; Winnipeg City Routes
← PR 312	→ PR 314

Provincial Road 313 (PR 313) is a 40-kilometre-long (25 mi) east-west highway in the Eastman Region of Manitoba, Canada. It begins at PTH 11 near Lac du Bonnet and ends at the remote community of Pointe du Bois.

PR 313 provides the main access to cottage country in the Lac du Bonnet area. It is also part of a loop (together with PR 304, PR 314, PR 315, and PTH 11) that provides access to several remote communities, First Nations reserves, and provincial parks on the eastern side of Lake Winnipeg.

== Major intersections ==
Division	Location	km	mi	Destinations	Notes
Lac du Bonnet		0.0	0.0	PTH 11 (La Vérendrye Trail) – Lac du Bonnet, Powerview-Pine Falls	Western terminus
Lac du Bonnet		1.3	0.81	PR 502 south – Lac du Bonnet	Northern terminus of PR 502
Lac du Bonnet		1.9	1.2	Airport Road – Lac du Bonnet Airport	
Lac du Bonnet		2.2– 2.6	1.4– 1.6	Bridge over the Winnipeg River (Lac du Bonnet)	
Lac du Bonnet		7.3	4.5	PR 520 south – Pinawa, Pinawa Dam Provincial Park	Northern terminus of PR 520
Lac du Bonnet		10.6	6.6	PR 433 north (Lee River Road)	Southern terminus of PR 433
Lac du Bonnet		11.4	7.1	Bridge over the Lee River (Lac du Bonnet)	
Alexander	Pinawa Bay	20.8	12.9	PR 315 east – Nopiming Provincial Park	Western terminus of PR 315
No. 1	Point du Bois	40.0	24.9	Glassco Avenue	Eastern terminus
1.000 mi = 1.609 km; 1.000 km = 0.621 mi

== Related route ==
Provincial Road 433
- Lee River Road, Cape Coppermine Road
- Location: Rural Municipality of Lac du Bonnet
- Length: 14.8 km (9.2 mi)
- Existed: 1966–present

Provincial Road 433 (PR 433) is a 14.8-kilometre-long (9.2 mi) north-south spur off of PR 313 in the Rural Municipality of Lac du Bonnet. It provides access to several cottage communities along the coastline of the Lee River portion of Lac du Bonnet, as well as the Granite Hills Golf Course. Portions of the highway are both paved and gravel.

Division	Location	km	mi	Destinations	Notes
Lac du Bonnet		0.0	0.0	PR 313 – Point du Bois, Lac du Bonnet	Southern terminus
Lac du Bonnet		4.5	2.8	Lagsdin Way	Pavement ends
Lac du Bonnet		6.6	4.1	Wilma's Way / Lee River Road	Transitions to Cape Coppermine Road
Lac du Bonnet	Cape Coppermine	14.8	9.2	Cape Coppermine Marina	Dead end; northern terminus
1.000 mi = 1.609 km; 1.000 km = 0.621 mi
