= Manitoba Provincial Road 315 =

Provincial road in Manitoba, Canada

Provincial Road 315
- PR 315 highlighted in red

Route information
- Maintained by Department of Infrastructure
- Length: 59 km (37 mi)
- Existed: 1966–present

Major junctions
- West end: PR 313 in Pinawa Bay
- PR 314 in Nopiming Provincial Park
- East end: Werner Lake Road (Ontario boundary)

Location
- Country: Canada
- Province: Manitoba
- Rural municipalities: Alexander

Highway system
- Provincial highways in Manitoba; Winnipeg City Routes
← PR 314	→ PR 317

Provincial Road 315 (PR 315) is a 59-kilometre-long (37 mi) east-west highway in the Eastman Region of Manitoba, Canada. It begins at PR 313 northeast of Lac du Bonnet and ends at the Ontario boundary, running through the southern part of Nopiming Provincial Park.

Provincial Roads 304, 313, 314, and 315, along with PTH 11, form a loop that provides access to several remote communities, First Nations, and provincial parks on the eastern side of Lake Winnipeg.

== Major intersections ==
Division	Location	km	mi	Destinations	Notes
Alexander	Pinawa Bay	0.0	0.0	PR 313 – Point du Bois, Lac du Bonnet	Western terminus
Alexander	Pinawa Bay	0.6	0.37	Bridge over Rice Creek	
Alexander	Poplar Bay	6.3	3.9	Poplar Bay Provincial Park	Access road into park
Alexander	Bird River	10.7	6.6	Bird River (Lac du Bonnet) Airport	Access road into airport
Alexander	Bird River	15.5– 15.6	9.6– 9.7	Bridge over the Bird River	
Alexander	Bird River	15.6	9.7	Pavement ends	
Alexander	Bird River	16.8	10.4	Bridge over Peterson Creek	
No. 19	Nopiming Provincial Park	30.7	19.1	PR 314 north – Bissett	Southern terminus of PR 314
No. 19	Nopiming Provincial Park	38.9	24.2	Bridge over the Bird River	
No. 19	Nopiming Provincial Park	59.0	36.7	Werner Lake Road – Werner Lake	Continuation beyond Ontario border; eastern terminus
1.000 mi = 1.609 km; 1.000 km = 0.621 mi
