= Manitoba Provincial Road 314 =

Provincial road in Manitoba, Canada

Provincial Road 314
- PR 314 highlighted in red

Route information
- Maintained by Department of Infrastructure
- Length: 73 km (45 mi)
- Existed: 1966–present

Major junctions
- North end: PR 304 near Bissett
- South end: PR 315

Location
- Country: Canada
- Province: Manitoba

Highway system
- Provincial highways in Manitoba; Winnipeg City Routes
← PR 313	→ PR 315

Provincial Road 314 (PR 314) is a 73-kilometre-long (45 mi) north-south highway in the Eastman Region of Manitoba, Canada, running through Nopiming Provincial Park. It begins at PR 304 near the northern boundary of the park and becomes PR 315 near its southern boundary.

Provincial Roads 304, 313, 314, and 315, along with PTH 11, form a loop that provides access to several remote communities, First Nations, and provincial parks on the eastern side of Lake Winnipeg.

== Major intersections ==
Division	Location	km	mi	Destinations	Notes
No. 19	Nopiming Provincial Park	0.0	0.0	PR 315 – Lac du Bonnet, Nopiming Lodge, Werner Lake, ON	Southern terminus
No. 19	Nopiming Provincial Park	73.0	45.4	PR 304 north – Bissett; Access road to Long Lake	Northern terminus; road continues as an access road to Long Lake
1.000 mi = 1.609 km; 1.000 km = 0.621 mi
