= Manitoba Provincial Road 520 =

Provincial road in Manitoba, Canada

Provincial Road 520
- Old Pinawa Road
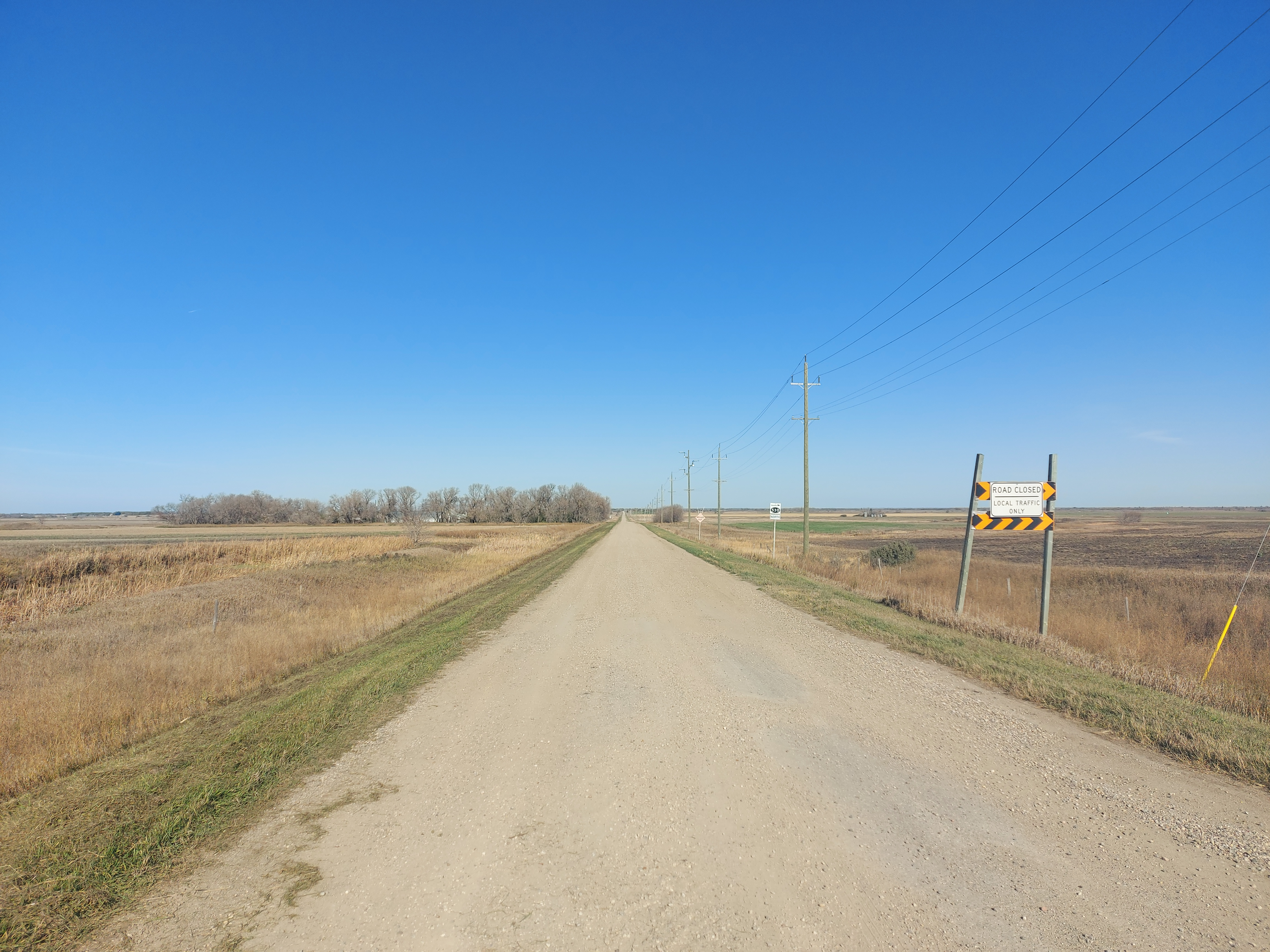
- Provincial Road 520

Route information
- Maintained by Department of Infrastructure
- Length: 14.1 km (8.8 mi)
- Existed: 1989–present

Major junctions
- South end: PR 211 in Pinawa
- North end: PR 313 near Lee River

Location
- Country: Canada
- Province: Manitoba
- Rural municipalities: Lac du Bonnet
- Major cities: Pinawa

Highway system
- Provincial highways in Manitoba; Winnipeg City Routes
← PR 519	→ PR 521

Provincial Road 520 (PR 520), also known as Old Pinawa Road, is a 14.1-kilometre-long (8.8 mi) north–south highway in the Eastman Region of Manitoba, connecting the town of Pinawa with Pinawa Dam Provincial Park and the Lee River area of the Rural Municipality of Lac du Bonnet.

== Route description ==
PR 520 begins in the Local Government District of Pinawa at an intersection with PR 211, just west of the town of Pinawa itself. It heads north through remote woodlands for a few kilometres, passing by a trail head for the Trans Canada Trail (Pinawa Trail) before entering the Rural Municipality of Lac du Bonnet. The highway soon enters farmland, crossing the Trans Canada Trail (Blue Water South Trail) and passing by Pinawa Dam Provincial Park. PR 520 passes some riverside cottages and a landfill before coming to an end at an intersection with PR 313 just west of Lee River. The entire length of PR 520 is a gravel, two-lane highway while running parallel to the Pinawa Channel of the Winnipeg River.

== Major intersections ==
Division	Location	km	mi	Destinations	Notes
Local Government District of Pinawa		0.0	0.0	PR 211 to PTH 11 – Pinawa	Southern terminus
Lac du Bonnet		7.6	4.7	Pinawa Dam Provincial Park	Access road into park
Lac du Bonnet		14.1	8.8	PR 313 – Lac du Bonnet, Pointe du Bois, Nopiming Provincial Park	Northern terminus
1.000 mi = 1.609 km; 1.000 km = 0.621 mi
