= Booter =

Booter may refer to:

- Self-booting disk, software loaded directly at the bootup of a computer, without the help of an operating system
- a commercial denial-of-service attack service, commonly known as a booter or stresser
- Marc Hill (born 1952), a Major League Baseball player nicknamed The Booter

== See also ==
- Boot (disambiguation)
