= Manitoba Provincial Road 211 =

Provincial road in Manitoba, Canada

Provincial Road 211
- PR 211 highlighted in red

Route information
- Maintained by Manitoba Infrastructure
- Length: 13.7 km (8.5 mi)
- Existed: 1966–present

Major junctions
- West end: PTH 11 near Seven Sisters Falls
- PR 520 in Pinawa
- East end: Willis Drive in Pinawa

Location
- Country: Canada
- Province: Manitoba
- Rural municipalities: Lac du Bonnet
- Major cities: Pinawa

Highway system
- Provincial highways in Manitoba; Winnipeg City Routes
← PR 210	→ PR 212

Provincial Road 211 (PR 211) is a short provincial road in the Canadian province of Manitoba. It provides access to Whiteshell Laboratories and the Local Government District of Pinawa in the eastern part of the province.

== Major intersections ==
Division	Location	km	mi	Destinations	Notes
Lac du Bonnet	Brookfield	0.0	0.0	PTH 11 – Beausejour, Lac du Bonnet	Western terminus
Lac du Bonnet / Pinawa boundary		0.7– 1.0	0.43– 0.62	Bridge over the Winnipeg River	
Local Government District of Pinawa		1.3	0.81	Ara Mooradian Way – Whiteshell Laboratories; Awanipark Drive – Awanipark	
Local Government District of Pinawa		9.7	6.0	PR 520 north (Old Pinawa Road) – Pinawa Dam Provincial Park	Southern terminus of PR 520
Local Government District of Pinawa		13.7	8.5	211 Road / Willis Drive – Pinawa	Eastern terminus; road continues east as 211 Road towards the Pinawa Channel diversion dam and Heritage Walk
1.000 mi = 1.609 km; 1.000 km = 0.621 mi
