= Iron Springs Bog SNA =

Protected area in Minnesota, US

- IUCN category V (protected landscape/seascape)
- Location within Minnesota Location within the United States
- Location: Clearwater County, Minnesota
- Nearest city: Shevlin, Minnesota
- Coordinates: 47.25859°N 95.24018°W
- Area: 231 acres (93 ha)
- Established: 1983
- Governing body: Minnesota Department of Natural Resources

Iron Springs Bog SNA is a scientific and natural area (SNA) of Minnesota, United States. It is located in Clearwater County and spans 231 acres. Iron springs bog is located in Minnesota's Chippewa Plains, two miles northeast of Lake Itasca, which is the headwaters of the Mississippi River and a popular tourist destination. Contrary to its name, Iron Springs Bog does not actually contain a bog. Rather, the wetland portion of the SNA is a fen fed by calcium-rich groundwater. The SNA is composed of both wetland and forest habitats. Iron Springs Bog hosts numerous rare plant species, notably orchids and carnivorous plants. Due to Iron Springs' proximity to the University of Minnesota's Itasca Biological Station, it has been the subject of various research papers focusing primarily on nutrient cycling and chemistry. The land occupied by the SNA is the ancestral land of the Anishinaabe and Lakota people.

== Ecology ==
Iron Springs Bog SNA is located within the Chippewa Plains section of Minnesota's Ecological Classification System. Moraines are among the primary landforms in this region, and thus, Iron Springs Bog is situated on the slope of a gravel moraine. This physiography contrasts Iron Springs Bog with other fens since they typically occur in a depression. Iron Springs Bog is considered a calcareous fen because its calcium-rich water is sourced from underground springs rather than precipitation. Along with calcium, Iron Springs Bog's water is also rich in magnesium and, as the name suggests, iron. Throughout the wetland, pools of water appear orange due to the concentration of iron in the water. The cool, calcium-rich groundwater fosters a unique vegetation community of plants that can tolerate low oxygen, low nutrient availability, and low temperatures. The SNA consists of four main habitat classifications: mesic hardwood forest, forested rich peatland, wet meadow/carr, and acid peatland.

=== Flora ===
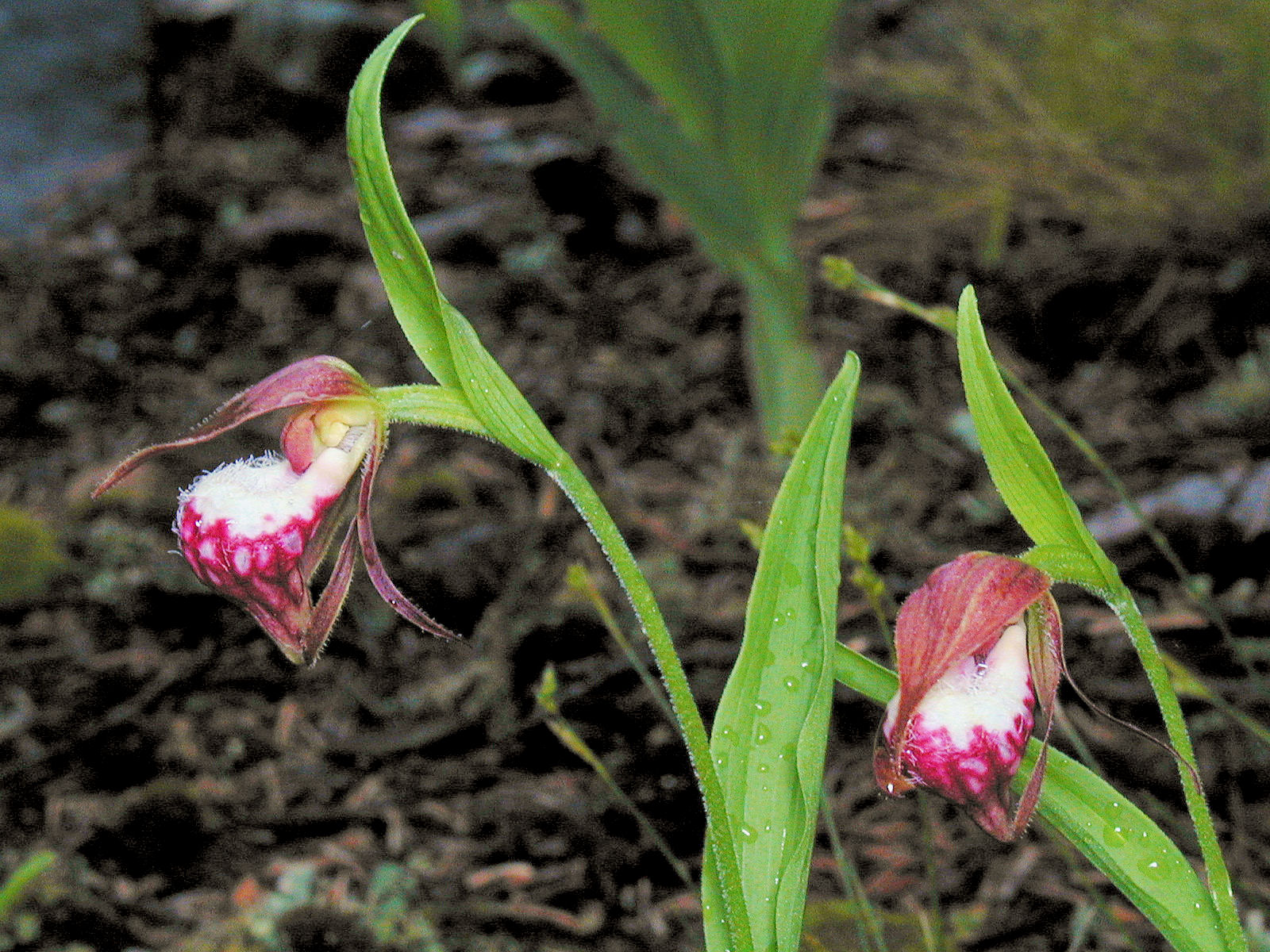
Ram's Head Orchid

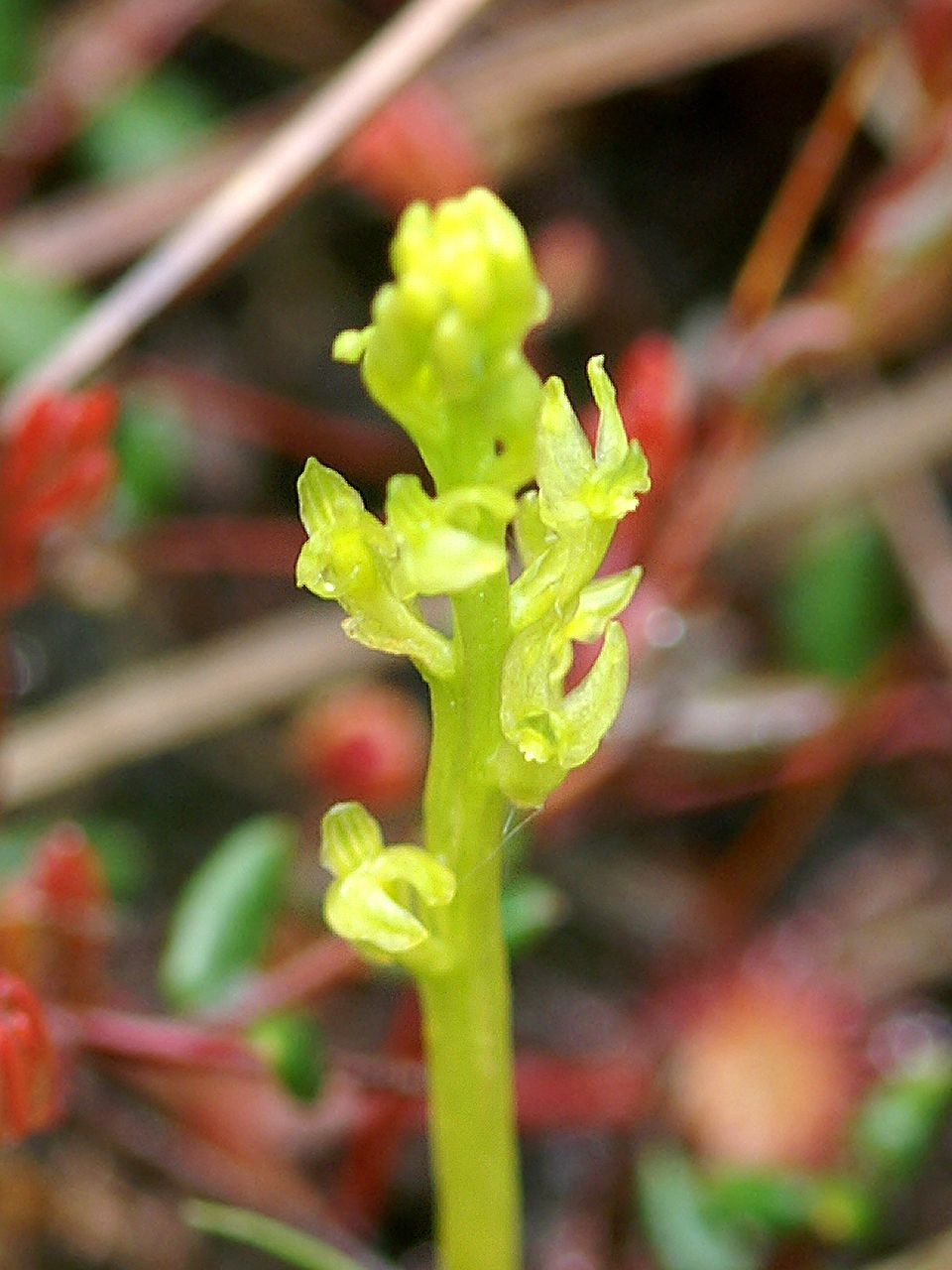
Bog Adder's Mouth

Iron Springs Bog SNA is predominantly forested, with the higher elevation areas predominantly made up of red pine and jack pine. Below this higher elevated area, the predominant tree cover switches towards trees more common in boreal forests including conifers such as balsam fir and white spruce, as well as deciduous trees more common in boreal forests such as paper birch and aspen. Two creeks run through the lower elevation areas, forming a swamp along the riparian zone featuring black spruce as the predominant tree. The understory features an array of plants including bryophytes, ferns, shrubs, grasses, and wildflowers including orchids. Some notable features of the understory are pitcher plants and sundew, both of which are carnivorous plants that are often found in nitrogen poor, calcium rich areas such as the Iron Springs Bog SNA. Other notable flora include species not commonly found in Minnesota such as winter bentgrass, bog adder's mouth, and ram's head orchid.

=== Fauna ===
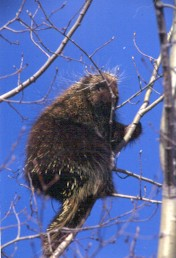
North-American Porcupine

Many birds call Iron Springs Bog SNA home, with 111 species having been recorded within the SNA. Due to close proximity, the bird populations closely reflect the populations present at nearby Itasca State Park. The SNA provides a good location for birding with attractions including 21 species of warblers, Common Loon, Wilson's Snipe, and many raptors. A complete list of the 111 species can be found at the SNA's Bird Checklist put together by the Minnesota DNR. Common mammals found in the area include white-tailed deer, black bears, and North American porcupines. Deer hunting and trout fishing are permitted within the SNA.

== Research at Iron Springs Bog SNA ==
=== Nitrogen Cycling ===
Professor David Biesboer, former director of the Itasca Biological Station, conducted research on nitrogen cycling at Iron Springs Bog. In 2000, Biesboer demonstrated that nitrogen fixation rates in Iron Springs Bog were very low, ranging from 0.43 μmol N fixed/m^{2}/day to 1.20 μmol N fixed/m^{2}/day. Because the bog has very low rates of nitrification, it also had no detectable signs of denitrification occurring. These low rates of nitrogen cycling processes in the bog likely stem from the low concentrations of nitrites and nitrates in the groundwater that feeds it and low rates of nitrification, mineralization, and ammonification. In a follow-up study in 2002, Biesboer examined the fluxes of nitrogen in Iron Springs Bog. This work determined that the primary source of nitrogen in the bog is from atmospheric deposition, accounting for 66% of nitrogen input. Atmospheric deposition is followed by fixation (19%), mineralization (12%), and surface water (3%). Biesboer hypothesized that most nitrogen fixation in the bog takes place in the Sphagnum layer since it dominates the understory. The high proportion of nitrogen input from atmospheric deposition could prove problematic because it can lead to surface water acidification and disturbances in nitrogen cycling in the bog. However, research has yet to determine the effects of high atmospheric nitrogen deposition in Iron Springs Bog.

=== Organic Matter Accumulation ===
In 1953, Dr. Gilbert A. Leisman published work on organic matter accumulation in bogs surrounding Itasca State Park, including Iron Springs Bog. By measuring the depth of the sedge mat layer, Leisman determined that the average rate of organic matter accumulation in Iron Springs Bog was 0.67 inches/year. All of the bogs tested displayed relatively similar rates of organic matter accumulation, ranging from 0.54 inches/year to 0.79 inches/year. In the top four inches of the sedge mat, Leisman found that 64% of the peat was in the form of Carex lasiocarpa, a sedge found in wetlands.

=== Chemistry ===
The fen within Iron Springs Bog SNA is highly alkaline and contain high levels of calcium which is introduced into the water through upwelling processes through the glacial till present in the SNA. As with many other fens rich in calcium, Iron Springs Bog SNA contains high levels of silicon. There are many other metals found in higher than usual concentrations in the SNA including Mg, Ba, Al, Fe, and Mn. The fens within Iron Springs Bog SNA also contain a lower than usual calcium/barium quotient (380) when compared to similar fens, with the quotient reflecting those found in poor fens.
