= Bissett, Manitoba =

Bissett
- Community
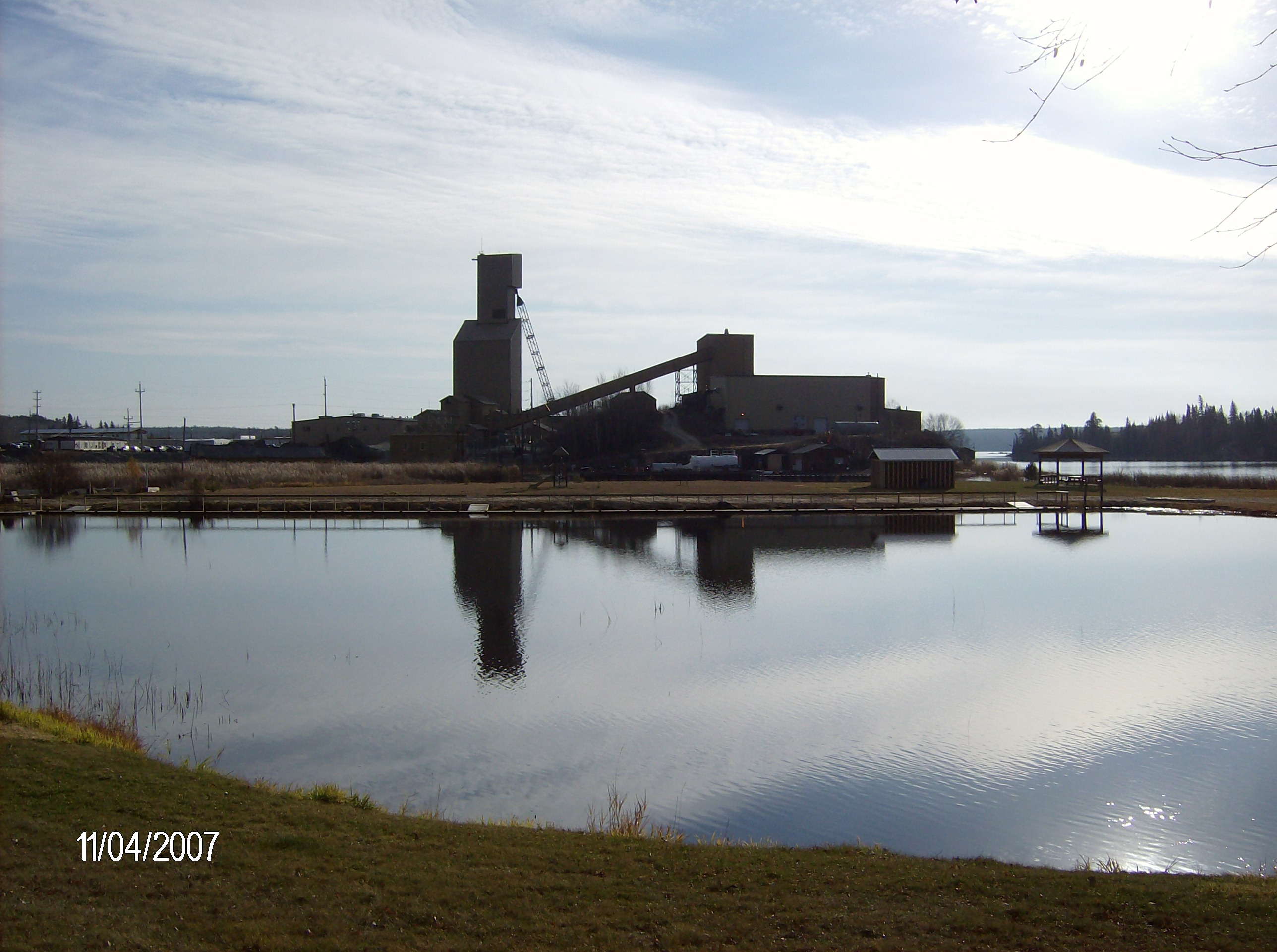
- San Gold Mine now known as the true North gold mine in Bissett
- Interactive map of Bissett
- Coordinates: 51.02583°N 95.68389°W
- Country: Canada
- Province: Manitoba
- Incorporated: 1972
- Named for: Edgar Douglas Richmond Bissett

Area
  - Land: 34.52 km^{2} (13.33 sq mi)

Population (2016)
  - Total: 153
  - Density: 4.4/km^{2} (11/sq mi)
- Website: bissettcc.com

Bissett is a community situated on Rice Lake in the southeastern region of Manitoba, Canada, classified as a northern community and designated place. Located two and a half hours northeast of Winnipeg on Provincial Road 304, Bissett is an entry point to Nopiming Provincial Park.

The discovery of gold in the community in 1911 made the region the cradle of gold mining in Manitoba. This was a steady industry for many years until closure of the mine in 1983. Mining executive John Draper Perrin helped finance the development of the town.

Today, Bissett is home to the True North Gold Mine (also called the Rice Lake Gold Mine), San Antonio Gold Mine, Wynne Drilling Corporation, Northern Wings Bed and Breakfast, and the San Antonio Hotel. The township also hosts the base of operations for the Boy Scouts of America Northern Tier High Adventure Base, which operates canoeing expeditions in the nearby Atikaki Provincial Wilderness. There is a school which features a half day nursery/kindergarten and one of the last remaining Grade 1 – 9 classrooms in Canada.

== History ==
Since around 1800, most of the land east of Lake Winnipeg belonged to the Anishinabe (Saulteaux); before the arrival of the Anishinabe, the land was of the Ojibway.

=== Gold rush ===
Joseph Tyrrell, in a Geographical Survey of Canada report, first identified the potential for gold in Bissett in 1900.

In early 1911, a Ojibway fur trapper named Duncan Two-hearts set out from his trapline at Turtle Lake. In addition to fur, Twohearts had a small bag full of rocks he had collected at Rice Lake, which he was going to show to a trader at Manigotagan, Manitoba, named Arthur Quesnel. The rocks had streaks of yellow running through them, which Quesnel and his friend Captain E. A. Pelletier recognized as being gold. At Rice Lake in March 1911, Two-hearts took Pelletier to a boulder of rusty quartz containing pure gold. Pelletier soon after staked a claim on 6 March, calling it Gabrielle, followed by other claims called San Antonio, Ross Fraction, and Island Fraction.

The discovery of gold precipitated an era of prospecting in the Wanipigow River watershed and in the current-day area of Nopiming. These regions became the hub of gold mining in Manitoba. The area saw an influx of prospectors from Kenora and Winnipeg, who came in canoes, following the old travel routes of the Indigenous peoples—the Bird (Oiseau), the Manigotagan, and other rivers.

The only person who seems to have found success from the rush, however, was Pelletier.

=== Establishment of Bissett ===
The community of Bissett came as result of Manitoba's first gold rush in the early 20th century. With the help of mining executive John Draper Perrin, who helped finance the development of the town, the community was recognized in 1972, represented by a mayor and council. Situated on Rice Lake, the town was named after physician, surgeon and politician Edgar Douglas Richmond Bissett, a Member of Parliament from September 1926 until July 1930.

The 1996 population was 159, and in 2012 it is approximately 125, although it rises significantly during the summer when the lake cabins fill up. A new mining project, San Gold, was started near the town in 2005 and ceased operations in June 2015.

== Climate ==
Climate data for Bissett
Month	Jan	Feb	Mar	Apr	May	Jun	Jul	Aug	Sep	Oct	Nov	Dec	Year
Record high °C (°F)	7.5 (45.5)	9 (48)	15.3 (59.5)	30 (86)	34 (93)	37.5 (99.5)	35 (95)	36.5 (97.7)	35.5 (95.9)	27.5 (81.5)	21.7 (71.1)	9 (48)	37.5 (99.5)
Mean daily maximum °C (°F)	−12.6 (9.3)	−8.1 (17.4)	−0.2 (31.6)	9.4 (48.9)	18 (64)	22.5 (72.5)	24.9 (76.8)	23.6 (74.5)	16.6 (61.9)	9.1 (48.4)	−1.6 (29.1)	−10.7 (12.7)	7.6 (45.7)
Daily mean °C (°F)	−19 (−2)	−15.2 (4.6)	−7.1 (19.2)	2.6 (36.7)	10.9 (51.6)	15.8 (60.4)	18.3 (64.9)	17.1 (62.8)	10.8 (51.4)	4.3 (39.7)	−5.9 (21.4)	−16.3 (2.7)	1.4 (34.5)
Mean daily minimum °C (°F)	−25.1 (−13.2)	−22.2 (−8.0)	−14 (7)	−4.2 (24.4)	3.7 (38.7)	9.1 (48.4)	11.7 (53.1)	10.5 (50.9)	4.8 (40.6)	−0.6 (30.9)	−10.2 (13.6)	−21.8 (−7.2)	−4.9 (23.2)
Record low °C (°F)	−46.1 (−51.0)	−44.5 (−48.1)	−39.5 (−39.1)	−30 (−22)	−11 (12)	−2.5 (27.5)	−0.6 (30.9)	−1.5 (29.3)	−6.7 (19.9)	−17 (1)	−38.5 (−37.3)	−43.3 (−45.9)	−46.1 (−51.0)
Average precipitation mm (inches)	21.5 (0.85)	17.5 (0.69)	26.9 (1.06)	31.9 (1.26)	50.9 (2.00)	89.3 (3.52)	73 (2.9)	79.5 (3.13)	67.9 (2.67)	48 (1.9)	30.1 (1.19)	20.6 (0.81)	557.2 (21.94)
Source: Environment Canada

== Demographics ==
In the 2021 Census of Population conducted by Statistics Canada, Bissett had a population of 115 living in 60 of its 125 total private dwellings, a change of 6.5% from its 2016 population of 108. With a land area of 31.62 km^{2} (12.21 sq mi), it had a population density of 3.6/km^{2} (9.4/sq mi) in 2021.

== See also ==
- Bissett Water Aerodrome
