= Boott =

Boott is a surname. Notable people with the name include:

- Elizabeth Boott (1846–1888), American painter
- Francis Boott (1792–1863), American physician and botanist active in Great Britain
- Francis Boott (composer) (1813–1904), American classical music composer
- Kirk Boott (1790–1837), American industrialist

== See also ==
- Boott Mills, part of an extensive group of cotton mills in Lowell, Massachusetts, US
- Boott Spur, a minor peak located in Coos County, New Hampshire, US
- Boot (surname), including a list of people with the name
- Boot (disambiguation)
