= Boot (surname) =

Boot is both a Dutch and English metonymic occupational surname. In Dutch, boot (/ˈboːt/) sounds like and means boat and the name refers to a "boatman". In English the name refers to the maker or seller of boots.

== Boot ==
- Alexander Boot (born 1948), Russian journalist and author
- Arnold Boot later Boate (1606–1653), Dutch physician, writer and Hebraist in Ireland
- Charles Boot (1874–1945), English businessman
- Cornelis Hendrik Boudewijn Boot (1813–1892), Dutch politician
- Eddie Boot (1915–1999), English footballer
- Elise Boot (1932–2023), Dutch jurist and former politician
- Fred Boot (born 1965), Dutch theatre producer
- Gerard Boot later Boate (1604–1650), Dutch writer and physician in Ireland
- Gladys Boot (1890–1964), British actress
- Harry Boot (1917–1983), English physicist
- Henri Frédéric Boot (1877–1963), Dutch painter and printmaker
- Henry Boot (1851–1931), English businessman, founder of Henry Boot PLC, father of Charles
- Jaap Boot (1903–1986), Dutch track and field athlete
- Jeremy Boot (born 1948), Australian bird and wildlife painter
- Jesse Boot, 1st Baron Trent (1850–1931), English businessman
- Joe Boot (probably an alias), one of the last stagecoach robbers in the US - see Pearl Hart
- John Boot, 2nd Baron Trent (1889–1956), English businessman and philanthropist, son of Jesse Boot
- Leonard Boot (1899–1937), English footballer
- Max Boot (born 1969), American author, lecturer, and military historian
- Micky Boot (born 1947), English footballer
- Oliver Boot (born 1979), English actor
- Pat Boot (1914–1947), New Zealand athlete
- Ton Boot (born 1940), Dutch basketball coach and player
- Vitali Boot, German amateur boxer
- William Henry James Boot (1848–1918), English artist, illustrator and author

== Boots ==
- Cornelius Boots, American composer and multi-instrumentalist
- Dave Boots (born 1955), American college basketball coach
- George Boots (1874–1928), Welsh international rugby union forward
- Mathieu Boots (born 1975), Dutch retired football player
- Phil Boots, American politician

== See also ==
- Boots (nickname)
- Boott, a variation of the surname
