= Booster Lake =

Lake in Manitoba, Canada

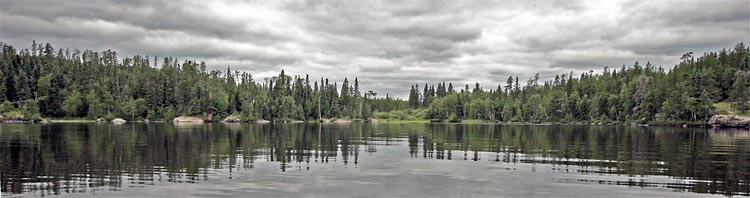
- Eagle Bay, Booster Lake

- Location of the lake in Manitoba Booster Lake (Canada)
- Location: Nopiming Provincial Park, Manitoba
- Coordinates: 50.44524°N 95.26746°W
- Primary inflows: Summerhill Lake
- Primary outflows: Booster Creek
- Basin countries: Canada
- Max. length: 5.1 kilometers (3.2 mi)
- Max. width: 2.3 kilometers (1.4 mi)
- Surface elevation: 320 meters (1,050 ft)

Booster Lake is located in Nopiming Provincial Park in the province of Manitoba, Canada.

It is located inside the Canadian Shield, at an elevation of 320 meters (1,050 ft), approximately 56 miles (90 km) northeast of Lac Du Bonnet and sits about 5 miles (8.0 km) west from the Ontario border. Highway 315 runs north of the lake.

The lake is fed by several creeks, and is drained by Booster Creek into Bird Lake, the source of Bird River, a tributary of the Winnipeg River.

The original road into the area was used for logging and mining. Years ago, they mined for gold, although that mine has been closed and dismantled. Active mining in the area is done around Bernic Lake by The Tanco Mining Company. The mine is an active producer of caesium, tantalum and spodumene.

== See also ==
- List of lakes of Manitoba
