= Manitoba Eco-Network =

The Manitoba Eco-Network is an environmental non-governmental organization (ENGO) and registered charity located in Winnipeg, Manitoba, Canada. It is a regional affiliate of the Canadian Environmental Network, based in Ottawa, Ontario. The Manitoba Eco-Network is a network for approximately 50 ENGOs throughout the province. The stated goal of the Manitoba Eco-Network is to "promote positive environmental action by connecting people and groups in our communities." In practice, it attempts to achieve this goal by providing services to its member groups and the public indirectly through its varied projects.

The Manitoba Eco-Network does not lobby and is non-partisan; however, some of its member groups are partisan organizations and may lobby government or participate in government consultations. The Steering Committee of the organization is elected at the Annual General Meeting and is composed of representatives of member groups and one or two individual members. Funding is provided by the Government of Manitoba, the Government of Canada, various foundations and granting agencies, membership fees, donations, and through fundraising events. In 2019, cuts to Manitoba's environmental programming budgets threatened the organization's future.

== Projects ==
=== Alice Chambers Memorial Library ===
The Alice Chambers Memorial Library is a public library of environmental information. It contains several thousand items, including books, journals, DVDs, and periodicals. In addition, the library is a public registry for development proposals in the Province of Manitoba. The Eco-Network has also partnered with another library in Manitoba (Ducks Unlimited) to offer an inter-library loan program.

=== Children's Health and Environment Partnership ===
The Children's Health and Environment Partnership was formed in 2003. At that time, it was a partnership between several environmental NGOs attempting to educate the public about the effects of environmental issues on the health of children. It was then called "The Children's Environmental Health Project". In from 2006 to 2008, it went through several changes and became a more formal project. A new website was launched and the name was changed to its current incarnation, The Children's Health and Environment Project.

In its current form, The Children's Health and Environment Partnership is composed of five supporting member groups, including The Manitoba Eco-Network.

=== Climate Change Connection ===
Climate Change Connection is an initiative to provide public education and outreach to Manitobans about [Climate Change]. This organization takes the position that man-made climate change is occurring. The organization was "started in January 2002 as part of Canada's effort to meet our Kyoto Protocol objectives." Climate Change Connection is partially funded by The Province of Manitoba and Manitoba Hydro, which is the main Manitoban electricity utility. It is jointly governed by The Manitoba Eco-Network and The University of Winnipeg. The organization frequently holds free workshops for young people to educate them about climate change, and teach them about potential ways to reduce greenhouse gas emissions.

=== ecoDriver Manitoba ===
The ecoDriver Manitoba program is the result of a partnership between Resource Conservation Manitoba and the Manitoba Eco-Network. According to the ecoDriver website, it is "a public outreach and education program aimed at helping Manitoba drivers save money by reducing their fuel consumption and at the same time decrease CO_{2} emissions." It was established in 2009 in a partnership with Manitoba Public Insurance and The Centre for Sustainable Transportation.

=== Eco-Journal ===
The Manitoba Eco-Network publishes the Eco-Journal five times per year, which features articles about Manitoba's environmental issues. It serves to provide a platform for individuals and groups to reach out to the community and share issues that may not be frequently covered in mainstream local press. This also provides an educational service to the community. The Eco-Journal is published both in printed form (on post-consumer recycled paper) and online. A voluntary subscription fee of $30 is charged, which also includes an individual membership.

=== GIS/Mapping Centre ===
The GIS/Mapping Centre is a project of the Manitoba Eco-Network, with the goal to help environmental organizations organize and interpret spatial data from a variety of sources. The GIS/Mapping Centre specializes in Graphical Information Systems (GIS), and has produced several interactive online maps (and printed maps) for public use.

The Winnipeg Green Map was produced to help the public identify environmental businesses, transportation methods, projects, and initiatives in their communities. It is available online and is built on a platform using Google Maps.

The Spence Neighbourhood Green Map is a more detailed version of the Winnipeg Green Map, focusing solely on the Spence Neighbourhood region of Winnipeg.

The Manigotagan River Map was produced to encourage use of Manitoba's natural Manigotagan River for recreational purposes such as canoeing, and to promote the river's preservation. This map is unique and gives a lot of details for each rapid. An online map also provides many more photos and more information.

=== Manitoba Environmental Youth Network ===
In October 2007, The Manitoba Eco-Network held an environmentally themed youth forum called Greenspace with the intention of stirring more youth involvement in the organization. There was a strong response, and several participants requested that a support group should be formed. In response, The Manitoba Eco-Network launched a new website and project called The Manitoba Environmental Youth Network. To better engage the younger demographic which the network aims to support, the website was built in the form of a self-contained [social network] on the Ning platform. The Manitoba Environmental Youth Network website is used by the community as a resource to plan events, participate in discussions, and seek out connections and support from other young environmentalists.

=== Organic Lawn Care Education ===
The Organic Lawn Care Education project was established by The Manitoba Eco-Network to provide workshops on organic lawn care practices and lawn care without harmful chemicals with the goal of decreasing exposure to pesticides and insecticides, and preventing excessive algae growth caused by water runoff from fertilizers.

=== Water Caucus ===
The Manitoba Eco-Network's Water Caucus is intended to support other environmental organizations in Manitoba with interests in water issues. It plays a similar role with water-themed environmental organizations to the role the Manitoba Eco-Network plays with all environmental organizations, in the sense that it is a non-advocacy group, but some of the groups it supports do have advocacy or partisan components. As part of its services, the Water Caucus provides an information directory on water issues to the public and a series of informative publications.

== Other activities ==
In addition to the services provided by its projects, The Manitoba Eco-Network:

- Provides its member groups with meeting space in the boardroom of the Eco-Centre, which is a Gold Level LEED Certified green building.
- Holds an annual member forum to facilitate discussion between different environmental organizations in Manitoba.
- Facilitates communication between the member groups, various levels of government, and the media by referring media enquiries to relevant member groups, and by connecting member groups to Environmental Assessment processed initiated by the government.
- Publicizes environmental events such as conferences, workshops, and film showings through The Manitoba Eco-Network's website and the electronic newsletter which is sent out to individual and group members.
- Provides a collection of news excerpts about environmental issues on its website to help viewers stay informed about current events.
- Connects individuals who are looking to volunteer with member groups which are looking for extra help through the Eco-Volunteer program.
- Hosts an annual Environmental Awards ceremony to celebrate individuals, groups, and businesses which demonstrate exceptional innovation or quality with regards to environmental initiatives.

== Supporters ==
=== Core Funding ===
- Manitoba Conservation
- Environment Canada / Canadian Environmental Network
- The City of Winnipeg Employees Charitable Fund
- The United Way Donor Designated Gifts Campaign
- Province of Manitoba All Charities Campaign

=== Climate Change Connection ===
- Federal Climate Change Action Fund (Natural Resources Canada/Environment Canada)
- Manitoba Climate Change Action Fund (Manitoba Energy, Science & Technology)
- Manitoba Hydro PowerSmart
- Eco-Action, Environment Canada
- The Winnipeg Foundation

=== GIS Mapping Centre Project ===
- George Cedric Metcalf Charitable Foundation
- The Winnipeg Foundation
- Sustainable Development Innovations Fund
- Environmental Systems Research Institute
- The Thomas Sill Foundation
- Canadian Council for Human Resources

=== Organic Lawn Care Project ===
- Province of Manitoba Urban Green Team
- City of Winnipeg
- Winnipeg Public Library
