= Manigotagan River Provincial Park =

Provincial park in Manitoba, Canada

- IUCN category II (national park)
- Location within Manitoba
- Interactive map of Manigotagan River Provincial Park
- Location: Manitoba, Canada
- Nearest city: Winnipeg, Manitoba
- Coordinates: 51°0′50″N 96°2′39″W
- Area: 74.3 km^{2} (28.7 sq mi)
- Designation: provincial park
- Authorized: December 1, 2004
- Established: 2004
- Governing body: Government of Manitoba
- Owner: Province of Manitoba

Manigotagan River Provincial Park is a nature park in the province of Manitoba, Canada, named for the whitewater Manigotagan River that runs through it. Designated as a provincial park by the Government of Manitoba on 1 December 2004, it is the 80th provincial park in Manitoba. It is considered to be a Class II protected area under the IUCN protected area management categories.

The park is 74.3 square kilometres (28.7 sq mi) in size, and is composed of two land-use categories: more than 99% of the park's area is backcountry—i.e., the area is protected from mining, logging, and hydroelectric development—and less than 1%, about 160,000 m^{2} (40 acres), is classified as recreational development.

== Natural environment ==
The area's topography includes sheer rock faces topped with jack pine and rock tripe lichen on the upstream stretches; as well as balsam poplar, green ash, and elderberry near the river mouth. The area also includes Prickly Pear Cactus and Canada yew, as well as wildlife moose, black bear, wolf, and woodland caribou.

== See also ==
- List of protected areas of Manitoba
- Manigotagan, Manitoba
