= Springer Lake =

Lake in Manitoba, Canada

- Location of the lake in Manitoba Springer Lake (Canada)
- Location: Nopiming Provincial Park, Manitoba, Canada
- Coordinates: 50°32′1″N 95°27′12″W
- Basin countries: Canada, United States

Springer Lake is a lake in the Canadian province of Manitoba, about 170 kilometres (110 mi) north-east of the city of Winnipeg. It is situated in Nopiming Provincial Park.

The Canadian Forces School of Survival and Aeromedical Training (CFSSAT) conducts Survival, Evasion, Resistance and Escape training at Springer Lake. Of note, CFSSAT's activities have served to reduce poaching within the Provincial Park.

== See also ==
- List of lakes of Manitoba
