= Canadian Environmental Network =

The Canadian Environmental Network (RCEN) is an umbrella organization for environmental non-governmental organizations (ENGOs) located across Canada. This non-profit organization was mainly funded by Environment Canada and helped to facilitate networking and communication between environmental organizations, and coordinate ENGO participation in consultations with government. A portion of the funding flowed through to affiliated provincial environmental networks before it was cancelled in 2011. The RCEN also works to educate the public on major issues and policy-making in regards to the environment.

The RCEN is independent and non-partisan, which means it does not take positions on environmental issues, although its members do. It was established in 1977 by six environmental organizations, and today connects more than 700 ENGOs through its eleven regional networks. The Manitoba Eco-Network is an example of one of the provincial umbrella groups in the network that have members from only that province.

== Organization ==
The RCEN facilitates and promotes sharing of knowledge, resources and collaborative efforts to influence domestic and international practices, policies, laws and agreements affecting the environment. An annual general meeting is held each year to elect a governing board of directors and national council which represent the network's diverse membership. A Conference on the Environment is also organized to allow staff, members from all the regional networks and the public to meet, plan and discuss environmental issues. This increases public participation in the democratic process and to helps Canadian citizens communicate more effectively with the federal government.

Several national caucus groups allow individual members to work collaboratively on issues. These caucuses also choose delegates to participate in government consultations through a transparent democratic selection process.

== Goals ==
The organization's principal mandate is to Protect the Earth and Promote Ecologically Sound Ways of Life by helping its member groups preserve and protect the natural beauty, diversity, habitats, landscapes, regions, forests, ecological integrity, quality of water, quality of air and health of all species and their interdependent relationships.
