= Chimney Rock Scientific and Natural Area =

Protected area in Minnesota, United States

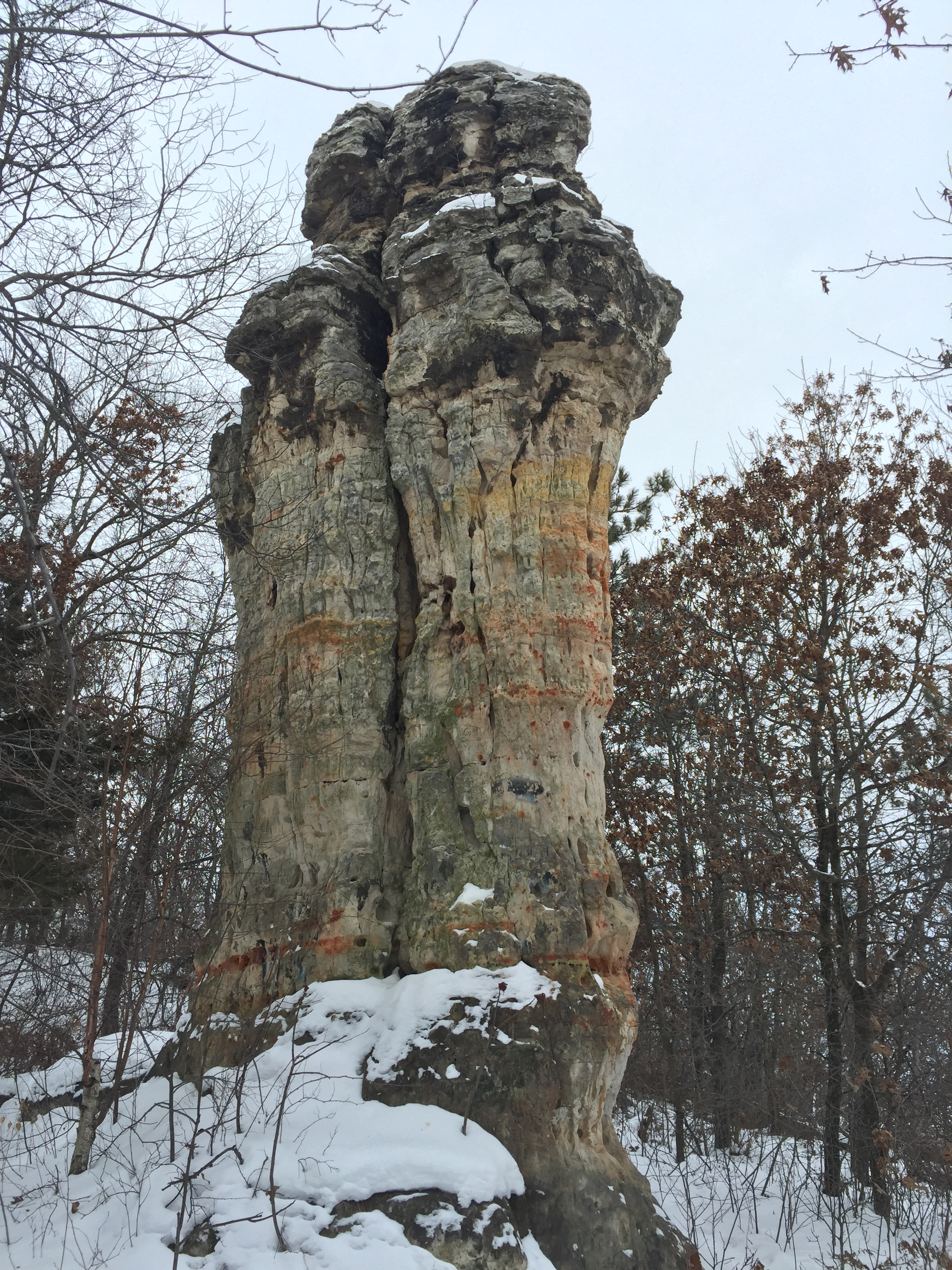
- Chimney Rock, a sandstone pillar, is the main feature of the SNA.

- Location within Minnesota Location within the United States
- Location: Dakota, Minnesota, United States
- Coordinates: 44°38′17.6″N 92°53′40.1″W
- Established: 2011
- Governing body: Minnesota Department of Natural Resources

Chimney Rock is a protected scientific and natural area in rural Dakota County, Minnesota. The area features a 30-foot-tall (9.1 m) sandstone rock pillar; the last remaining in the county.

== History ==
Natural sandstone pillars have been noted in two other areas of the county. The community and township of Castle Rock are eponymous with a similar formation which later collapsed. Lone Rock in Empire Township was noted by Zebulon Pike in the early 1800s, but has since eroded significantly.

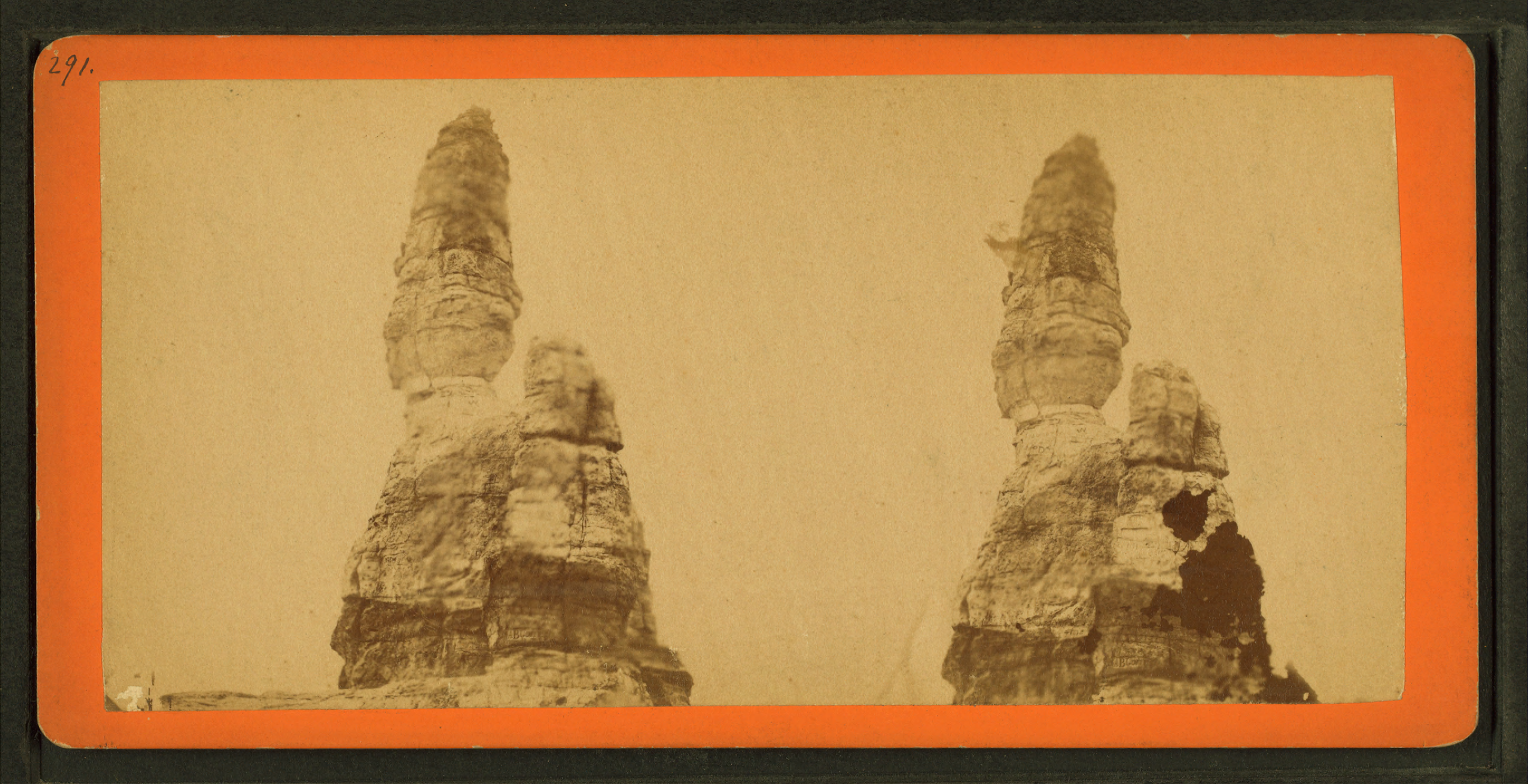
Stereoscopic image of Castle Rock by Benjamin Franklin Upton

Chimney Rock was noted as a landmark for settlers who moved to Dakota County in the 1800s. It was described as "the most picturesque and perfect example of columnar rock weathering in Minnesota" in 1905.

Efforts to preserve Chimney Rock began in 2002 with a county bond issue preserving natural areas. In 2011, the Minnesota Department of Natural Resources bought 76 acres of land surrounding the formation, which became the Scientific and Natural Area. A local group of DNR volunteers, the Hastings Environmental Protectors, maintains the SNA.
