= Little Boot Lake =

Lake in the state of Minnesota, United States

- Location within Minnesota
- Location: Beltrami County, Minnesota
- Coordinates: 47°27′49″N 95°0′2″W
- Type: lake

Little Boot Lake is a lake in Beltrami County, Minnesota, in the United States.

Little Boot Lake was named from the fact its outline resembles a boot.

== See also ==
- List of lakes in Minnesota
