= Cornelis Hendrik Boudewijn Boot =

Dutch politician

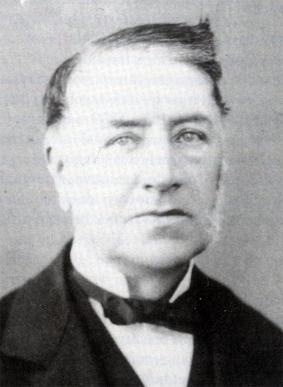
Mr. C.H.B. Boot

Cornelis Hendrik Boudewijn Boot (15 September 1813 – 5 November 1892) was a Dutch politician. He was mayor of Amsterdam between 1855 and 1858. He then served as Minister of Justice from 1858 until 1860. Boot served on the Council of State from 1860 until 1888.

== Life ==
Boot was born in Arnhem on 15 September 1813. His father was a minister in the Dutch reformed church, his mother died a half year after his birth. He became a member of the municipal council of Amsterdam on 15 October 1851 and remained a member until 18 March 1858. During this period he also served as mayor of Amsterdam from 1 February 1855 until 18 March 1858. He also served as member of the Provincial Council of North Holland from 6 November 1855 until 18 March 1855.

On that latter date he became Minister of Justice in the cabinet of Jan Jacob Rochussen. During his time in office he tried to establish a law on the judicial organisation, but failed. He left the office on 23 February 1960.

After his time in the cabinet he became a member of the Council of State in which he served from 1 March 1860 until 1 July 1888.

He died in The Hague on 5 November 1892.
