= Manigotagan River =

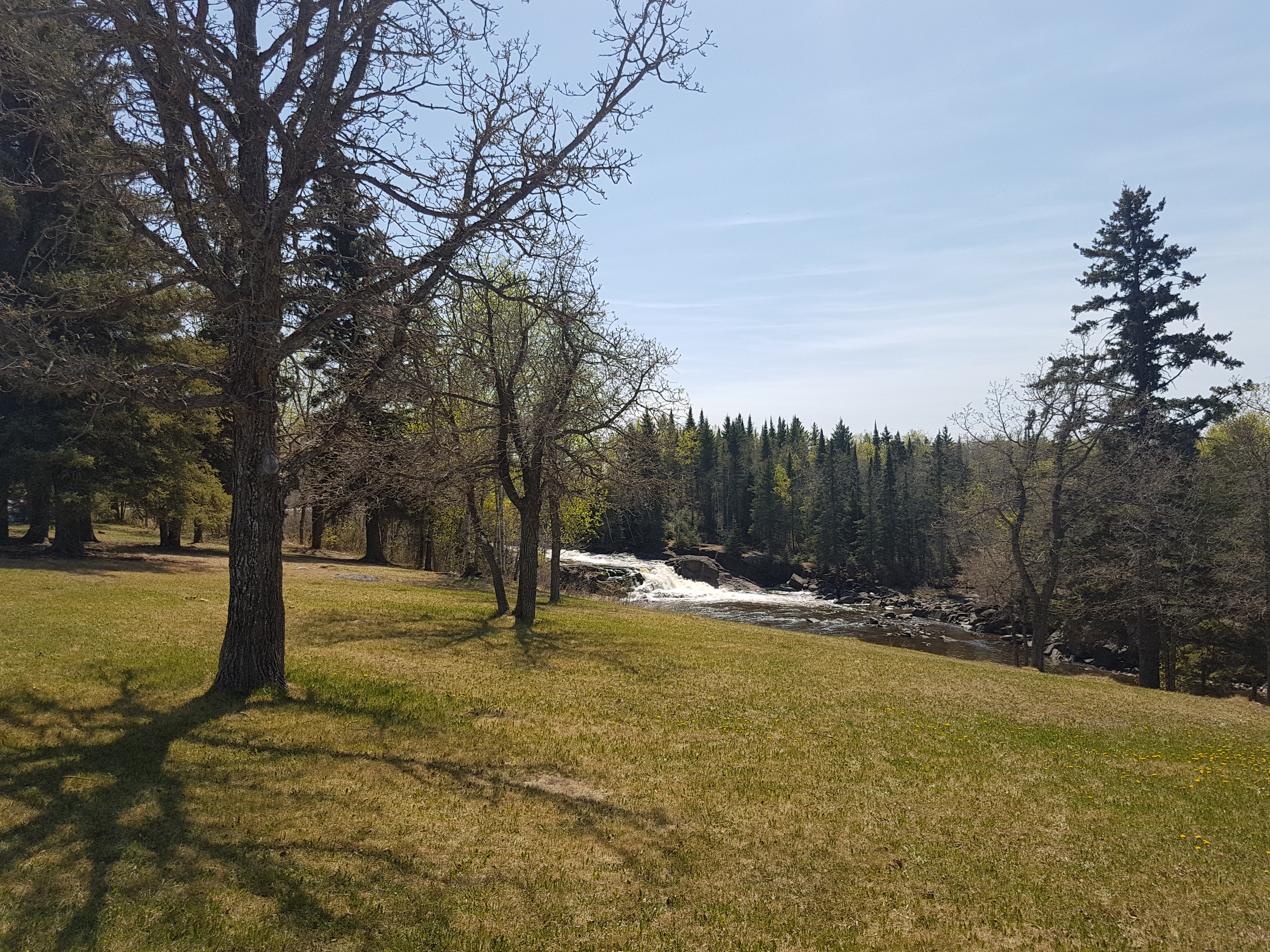
- Manigotagan Falls

- Location within Manitoba

Location
- Country: Canada
- Province: Ontario, Manitoba

Physical characteristics
- Source: Eden Lake
  - location: Kenora District, Ontario
  - coordinates: 50°40′39″N 95°00′21″W
  - elevation: 333 m (1,093 ft)
- Mouth: Lake Winnipeg
  - location: Manigotagan, Manitoba
  - coordinates: 51°07′03″N 96°20′28″W
  - elevation: 217 m (712 ft)
- Basin size: 1,830 km^{2} (710 sq mi)
- Discharge
  - location: Manigotagan, Manitoba
  - average: 8.93 m^{3}/s (315 cu ft/s)
  - minimum: 0.065 m^{3}/s (2.3 cu ft/s)
  - maximum: 103 m^{3}/s (3,600 cu ft/s)

The Manigotagan River is a whitewater river located in southeastern Manitoba, Canada. The river flows into the eastern side of Lake Winnipeg and it is a rare remote river of southern Canada. Situated at the river's mouth, near the shore of Lake Winnipeg, is the community of Manigotagan.

The name comes from the Cree language meaning "bad throat", which refers to the roar of the water that resembles the clearing of the throat.

The last southern herd of woodland caribou in Canada can be found near this river and in Nopiming Provincial Park. Logging roads and overdevelopment can potentially threaten the important habitat and ecology of this area. The river is popular for canoeing, and is close to the many remote and pristine rivers along the east side of Lake Winnipeg. These eastern rivers in Manitoba are the last undeveloped rivers in Southern Canada.

The river is protected in the Manigotagan River Provincial Park (which was designated as a provincial park by the Government of Manitoba in 2004) and Nopiming Provincial Park in Manitoba, as well as the Eagle-Snowshoe Conservation Reserve in Ontario.

In 2008, the Manitoba Eco-Network's mapping centre launched a new GIS map of the river, along with a website. It is a unique map and website combination that details all the features along the river, and it is a first of its kind in Canada for a river map.

== See also ==
- Poplar River
- Bloodvein River
- Berens River
- Rivers of Manitoba
