= Boot Lake (Nova Scotia) =

Lake in Victoria County, Nova Scotia, Canada

- Location within Nova Scotia
- Location: Victoria County, Nova Scotia
- Coordinates: 46°33′9″N 60°28′38″W
- Basin countries: Canada

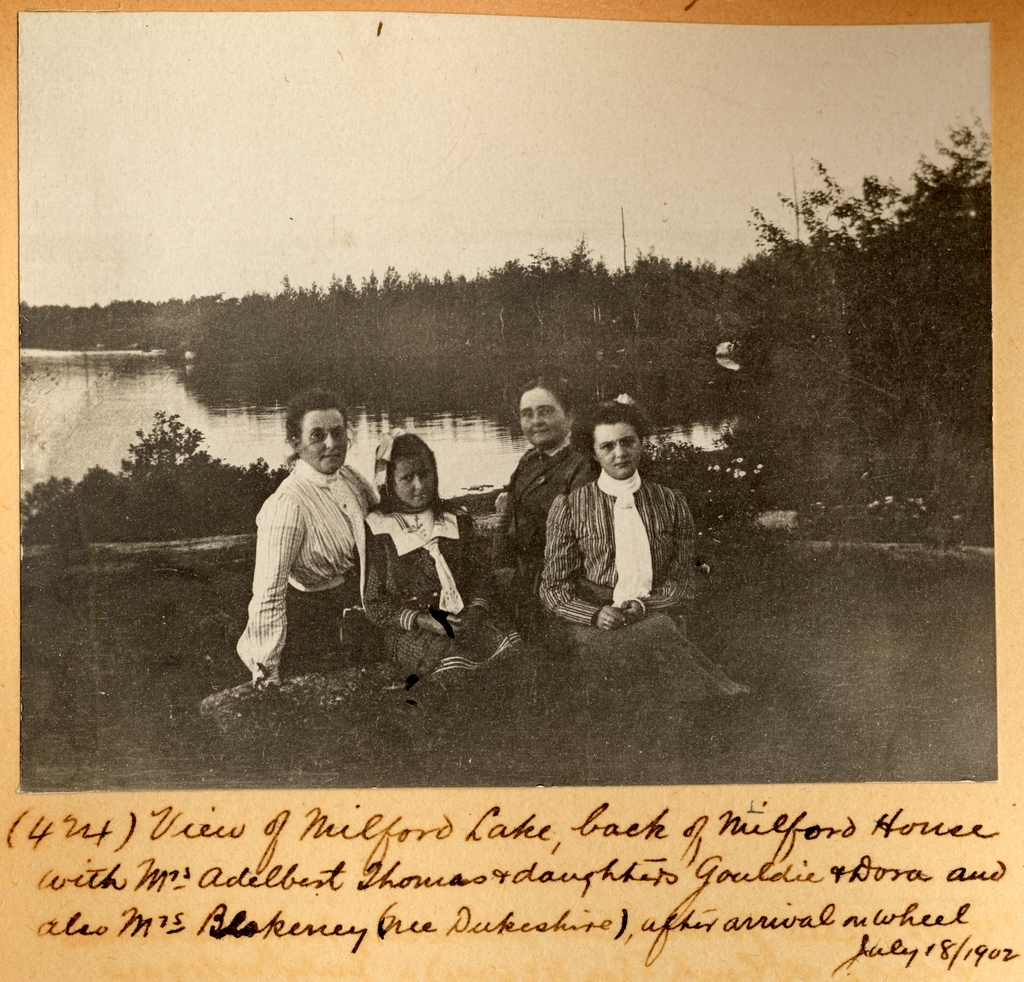
View of Milford Lake [Boot Lake, South Milford], back of Milford House with Mrs. Adelbert Thomas [Annie] & daughters Gouldie [Goldie] & Dora and also Mrs. Blakeney (nee Dukeshire), after arrival on wheel July 18/1902

Boot Lake is a lake of Victoria County, in north-eastern Nova Scotia, Canada.

== See also ==
- List of lakes in Nova Scotia
