= Boot Inn, Chester =

Boot Inn
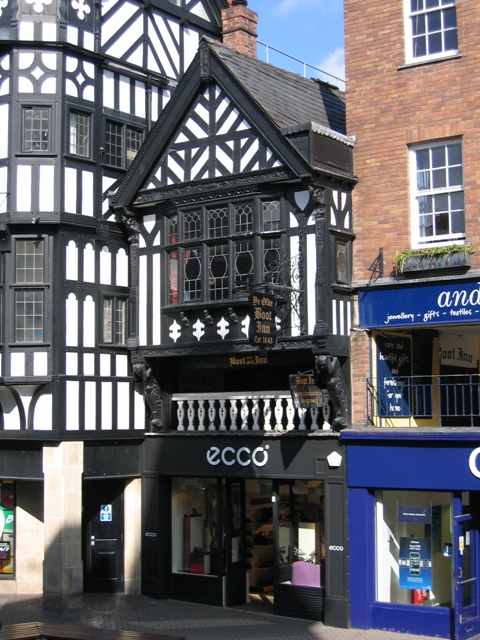
- Boot Inn, Chester

- Location in Cheshire
- 53.1905°N 2.8908°W

Listed Building – Grade II*
- Official name: No. 17 Street and No. 9 Row (The Boot Inn), Chester
- Reference no.: 1376216

The Boot Inn is at 17 Eastgate Street and 9 Eastgate Row, Chester, Cheshire, England. It is recorded in the National Heritage List for England as a designated Grade II* listed building. The building consists of a shop occupying a former undercroft at street level, above which is a public house at the level of the Row and above.

== History ==
The Boot Inn was built in the early to middle part of the 17th century, opening as an inn in 1643. Its façade was rebuilt and restored in the late 19th century. For many years most of the front section of the building at Row level was occupied by a barber's shop, with a corridor leading to the public house beyond it. Since alterations and restorations were carried out in 1988 the whole of the Row level has been occupied by a public house.

== Architecture ==
The building is constructed in sandstone, the upper storeys being timber-framed with plaster panels, and is roofed in slate. It is in three storeys, and has one bay. At ground level is a modern shop front. At the level of the Row a shaped balustrade. Behind this is a stallboard, the paved walkway of the Row, and the restored entrance front to the public house. The top storey is jettied and carried on brackets carved with figures. It contains a canted five-light mullioned and transomed oriel window above five shaped panels. At the sides of the window are close studded panels and pilasters. Above the window is a carved tie-beam, and a gable containing herringbone studding. The bargeboards are moulded with a drop finial.

== See also ==
- Grade II* listed buildings in Cheshire West and Chester
