= Boot Rock =

Rock formation in South Georgia and the South Sandwich Islands, United Kingdom

Boot Rock (57°3′S 26°39′W) is a rock, 30 metres (100 ft) high, which lies 0.1 nautical miles (0.2 km) off the southeast side of Candlemas Island in the South Sandwich Islands. It was charted and named by Discovery Investigations personnel on the Discovery II in 1930.
