= Boot Lake (Lake County, Minnesota) =

Lake in the state of Minnesota, United States

- Location within Minnesota
- Location: Lake County, Minnesota
- Coordinates: 48°0′52″N 91°21′30″W
- Type: Lake
- Surface elevation: 1,384 feet (422 m)

Boot Lake is a lake in Lake County, in the U.S. state of Minnesota.

Boot Lake was so named on account of its outline being shaped like a boot.

== See also ==
- List of lakes in Minnesota
