= Boots (nickname) =

Boots, as a nickname, may refer to:

- Boots Adams (1899–1975), American business executive
- Boots Anson-Roa (born 1945), Filipino actress, columnist, editor and lecturer
- Frederick C. Blesse (1921–2012), American Air Force major general and flying ace
- Boots Day (born 1947), retired Major League Baseball player
- Boots Donnelly (born 1942), American former college football coach
- Boots Hansen, co-founder of Boots & Coots, a well control company
- Boots Mallory (1913–1958), American actress, dancer and model
- Boots Mussulli (1915–1967), Italian-American jazz saxophonist
- Boots Poffenberger (1915–1999), Major League Baseball pitcher
- Boots Randolph (1927–2007), American saxophonist
- Boots Riley (born 1971), American vocalist
- Ernest Ivy Thomas, Jr. (1924–1945), US Marine Corps sergeant

== See also ==
- Boots (surname)
- Caligula, Roman emperor whose childhood nickname meant "Little Boots"
- "The Boot", nickname of New Zealand rugby union player Don Clarke (1933–2002)
