= Leonard Boot =

English footballer

Personal information
- Full name: Leonard George William Boot
- Date of birth: 4 November 1899
- Place of birth: West Bromwich, England
- Date of death: 23 November 1937 (aged 38)
- Place of death: West Bromwich, England
- Height: 5 ft 11 in (1.80 m)
- Position: Goalkeeper

Senior career*
Years	Team	Apps	(Gls)
1923	York City	10	(0)
1923–1925	Huddersfield Town	10	(0)
1925–1926	Fulham	9	(0)
1926–1927	Bradford City	7	(0)
1927–192?	Nottingham Forest	2	(0)
–	Caernarfon Town	?	(?)
–	Worcester City	?	(?)
Total		38	(0)
- * Club domestic league appearances and goals

Leonard George William Boot (4 November 1899 – 23 November 1937) was an English footballer who played in the Football League for Huddersfield Town, Fulham, Bradford City and Nottingham Forest. He made 15 appearances in all competitions for York City in the 1923–24 season. He was born in West Bromwich and died in that town at the age of 38 following a motorcycle accident.

He was at Huddersfield when they won the First Division in 1923–24 and 1924–25, though he only made 5 appearances in each season, meaning he did not qualify for a medal.

For Bradford City, he made 7 appearances in the Football League.
