= Boot Lake (Anoka County, Minnesota) =

Lake in the state of Minnesota, United States

- Location within Minnesota
- Location: Anoka County, Minnesota
- Coordinates: 45°20.5′N 93°7.5′W
- Type: Lake
- Surface elevation: 902 feet (275 m)

Boot Lake is a lake in Anoka County, Minnesota, in the United States.

Boot Lake was so named for its outline is said to resemble a boot.

== See also ==
- List of lakes in Minnesota
