= Shevlin, Minnesota =

City in Minnesota, United States

Shevlin Gwaaba'andaawangaakwa'igaang
- City
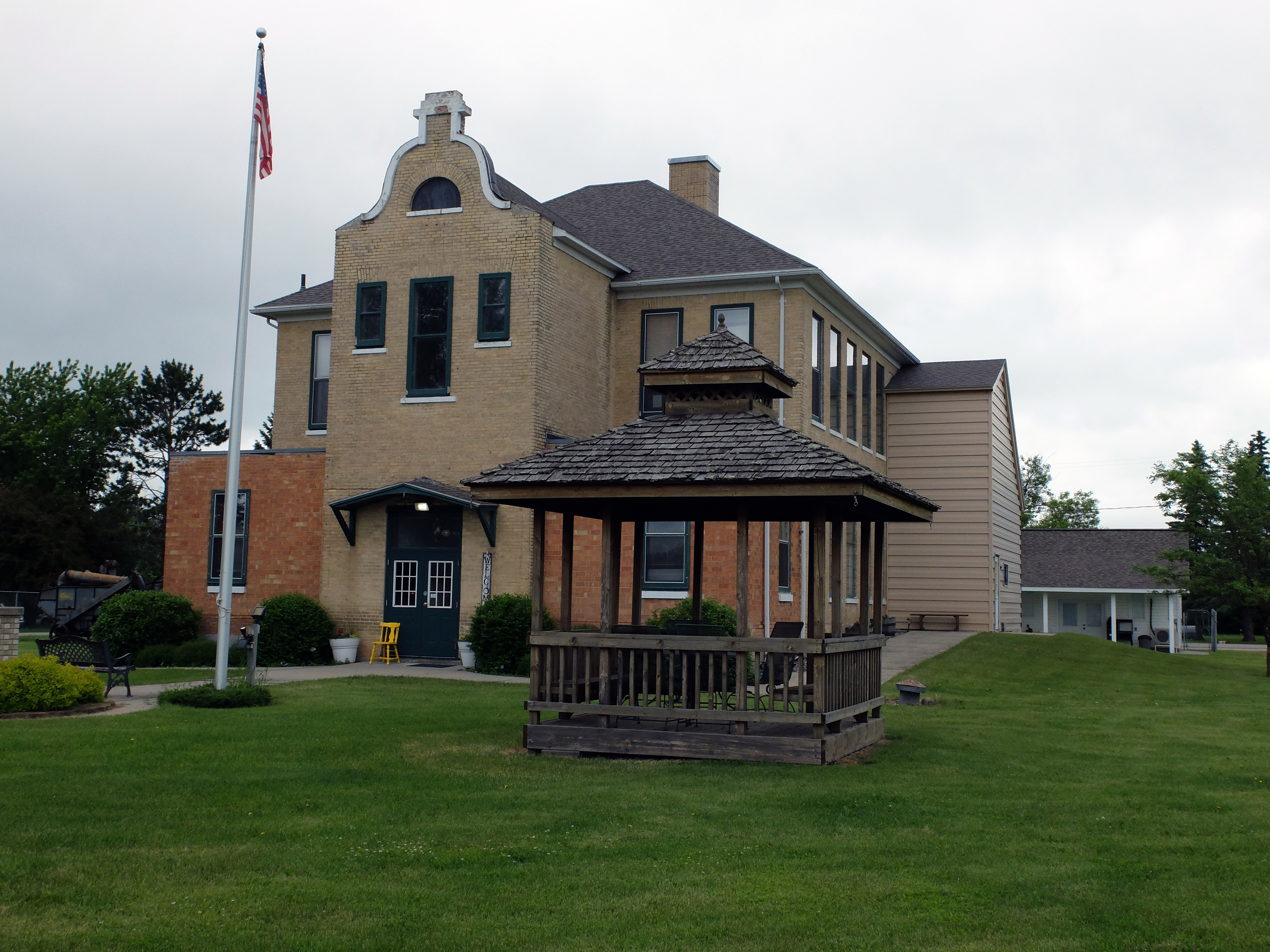
- Clearwater County History Center in Shevlin

- Location of Shevlin, Minnesota
- Coordinates: 47°31′46″N 95°15′39″W
- Country: United States
- State: Minnesota
- County: Clearwater

Area
  - Total: 0.80 sq mi (2.08 km^{2})
  - Land: 0.80 sq mi (2.08 km^{2})
  - Water: 0 sq mi (0.00 km^{2})
- Elevation: 1,453 ft (443 m)

Population (2020)
  - Total: 137
  - Estimate (2021): 138
  - Density: 170.3/sq mi (65.74/km^{2})
- Time zone: UTC-6 (CST)
  - Summer (DST): UTC-5 (CDT)
- ZIP code: 56676
- Area code: 218
- FIPS code: 27-59782
- GNIS feature ID: 0659763

Shevlin is a city in Clearwater County, Minnesota, United States. The population was 137 at the 2020 census.

== History ==
Shevlin was founded as a logging camp in the late 19th century. The town was named after Thomas H. Shevlin (1852-1912), a lumber baron. Shevlin resides in Clearwater County which seceded from Beltrami County. Shortly after Shevlin made a bid to be the county seat for the new county but the town's folk were defeated in the general election and the county seat went Bagley. Boasting a robust economy the streets of Shevlin were lined with shops, blacksmiths, saloons, hotels, casinos, brothels, and livery stables, a fire claimed most of these buildings in 1904 and again in 1911. Other businesses have made Shevlin their base of operations as well. They include Shevlin cooperative creamery, the locker plant, a saw mill, The co-op oil station, a box factory, several general, hardware and drug stores, three saloons a couple of restaurants, a newspaper, a millinery, barbershop, and doctors' offices. The local Ojibwe needing a name to call this new community in the area started to call Shevlin as Gwaaba'andaawangaakwa'igaang meaning "at where one is shoveling sand" where "shoveling" was a play on words with the City's English name.

== Present day ==
In 1991 the Shevlin School, built in 1911, closed and the students bused to Bagley. A history museum now occupies the old school building. Shevlin today has two churches, two bars, mini storage and numerous other home based enterprises.

== Geography ==
According to the United States Census Bureau, the city has a total area of 0.80 square miles (2.07 km^{2}), all land.

Shevlin is along U.S. Highway 2. It is six miles east of Bagley, and 20 miles west of Bemidji.

== Demographics ==
Historical population
Census	Pop.	Note	%±
1900	172		—
1910	172		0.0%
1920	184		7.0%
1930	228		23.9%
1940	226		−0.9%
1950	242		7.1%
1960	203		−16.1%
1970	185		−8.9%
1980	193		4.3%
1990	157		−18.7%
2000	160		1.9%
2010	176		10.0%
2020	137		−22.2%
2021 (est.)	138		0.7%
U.S. Decennial Census; 2020 Census

=== 2010 census ===
As of the census of 2010, there were 176 people, 71 households, and 44 families residing in the city. The population density was 220.0 inhabitants per square mile (84.9/km^{2}). There were 82 housing units at an average density of 102.5 per square mile (39.6/km^{2}). The racial makeup of the city was 89.8% White, 2.3% Native American, 0.6% Pacific Islander, 2.3% from other races, and 5.1% from two or more races. Hispanic or Latino of any race were 2.8% of the population.

There were 71 households, of which 31.0% had children under the age of 18 living with them, 39.4% were married couples living together, 11.3% had a female householder with no husband present, 11.3% had a male householder with no wife present, and 38.0% were non-families. Of all households 32.4% were made up of individuals, and 15.5% had someone living alone who was 65 years of age or older. The average household size was 2.48 and the average family size was 3.20.

The median age in the city was 39 years. 27.3% of residents were under the age of 18; 7.8% were between the ages of 18 and 24; 26.1% were from 25 to 44; 28.9% were from 45 to 64; and 9.7% were 65 years of age or older. The gender makeup of the city was 52.8% male and 47.2% female.

=== 2000 census ===
As of the census of 2000, there were 160 people, 69 households, and 40 families residing in the city. The population density was 201.1 inhabitants per square mile (77.6/km^{2}). There were 76 housing units at an average density of 95.5 per square mile (36.9/km^{2}). The racial makeup of the city was 96.25% White, 0.62% Native American, and 3.12% from two or more races.

There were 69 households, out of which 33.3% had children under the age of 18 living with them, 46.4% were married couples living together, 4.3% had a female householder with no husband present, and 42.0% were non-families. Of all households 33.3% were made up of individuals, and 10.1% had someone living alone who was 65 years of age or older. The average household size was 2.32 and the average family size was 3.03.

In the city, the population was spread out, with 25.0% under the age of 18, 8.1% from 18 to 24, 31.9% from 25 to 44, 26.9% from 45 to 64, and 8.1% who were 65 years of age or older. The median age was 37 years. For every 100 females, there were 119.2 males. For every 100 females age 18 and over, there were 110.5 males.

The median income for a household in the city was $30,000, and the median income for a family was $37,813. Males had a median income of $23,750 versus $20,000 for females. The per capita income for the city was $20,015. About 6.7% of families and 12.6% of the population were below the poverty line, including 15.6% of those under the age of eighteen and 8.3% of those 65 or over.

== Festivals ==
Shevlin was the home of the Minnesota's Logging Championships held during a festival known as Sawdust Dayz. The competition pitted both amateur and professional loggers against one another in logging events that included log toss, log rolling, axe throw, bow saw, speed cutting, stock saw, standing block chop, two man bucking saw, power saw and the Jack and Jill Crosscut competition. Part of the Sawdust Dayz celebration included parades, bed races, the nickel pick, a variety of kids games, horseshoe competition, and a battle of area fire departments. Sawdust Dayz began in 1987 a project of SCIP (Shevlin Community Improvement Project).

== Gallery ==
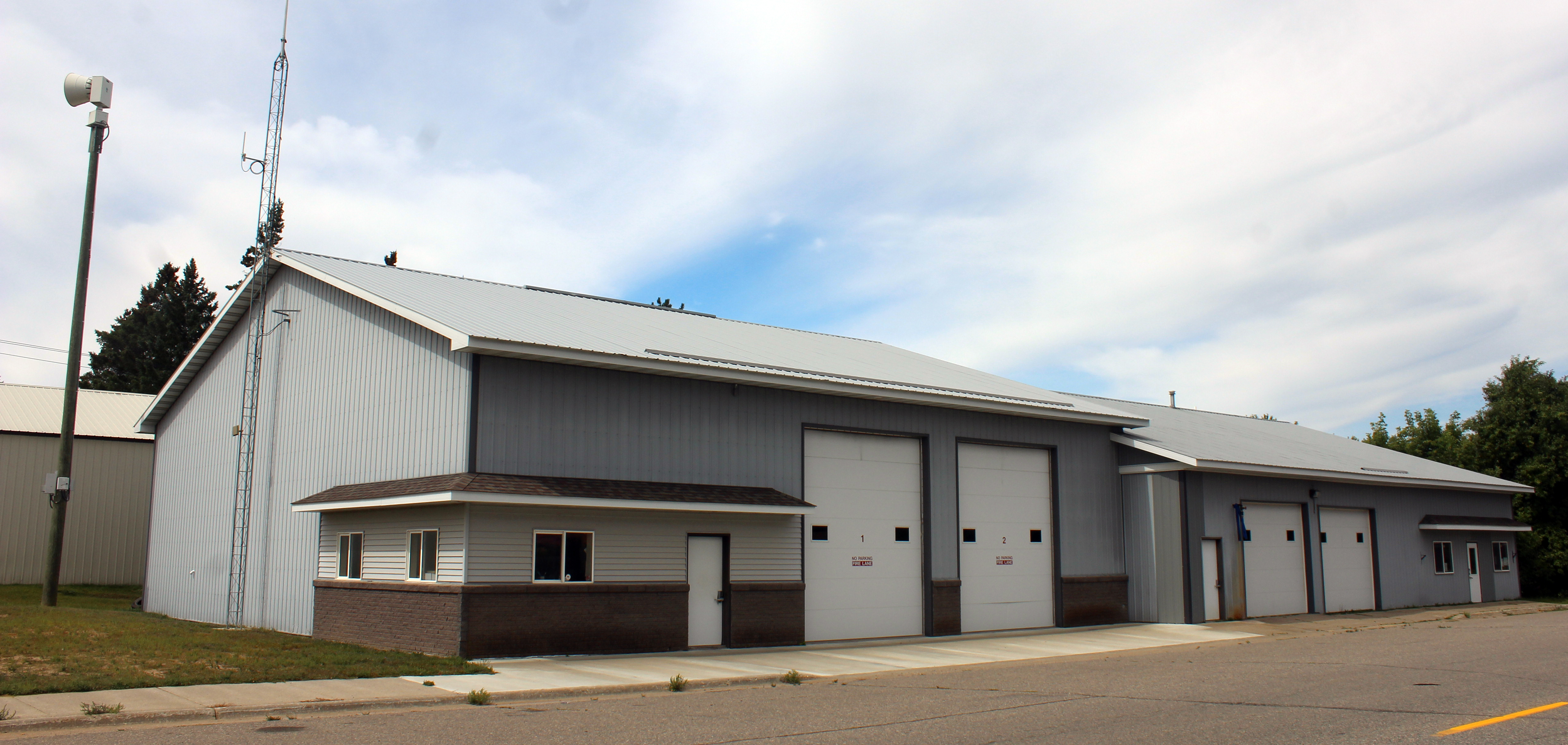
City Hall and Fire Department

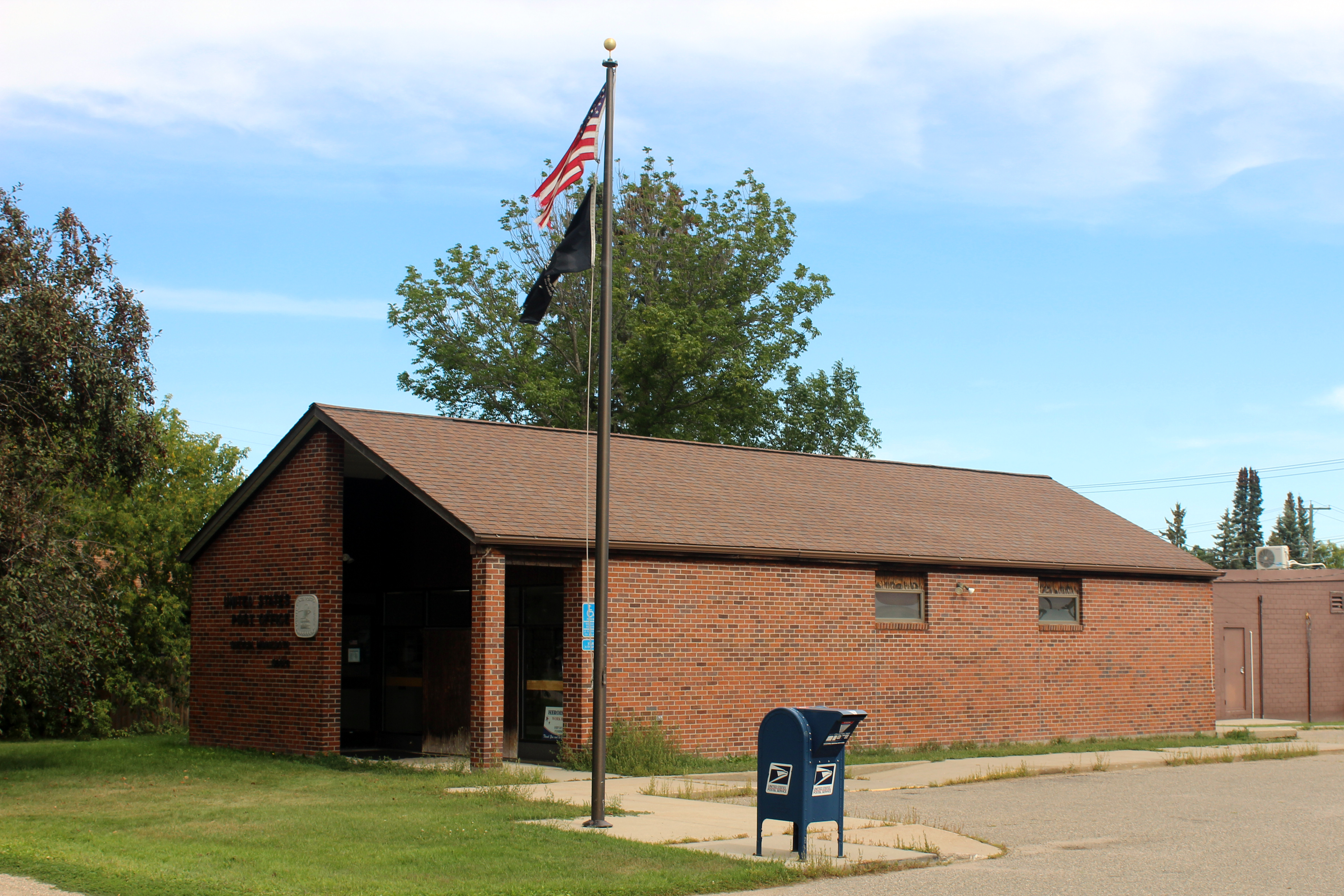
Post office
