= Black River (Red Lake River tributary) =

Coordinates: 47.8741365°N 96.4178325°W

Location
- Country: United States

Physical characteristics
- Source
  - location: Minnesota

The Black River is a 33.7-mile-long (54.2 km) tributary of the Red Lake River of Minnesota in the United States. Via the Red Lake River, the Red River of the North, Lake Winnipeg, and the Nelson River, it is part of the Hudson Bay watershed.

The Black River was so named on account of its peat-stained waters.

== See also ==
- List of rivers of Minnesota
