= Pinawa Dam Provincial Park =

Provincial park in Manitoba, Canada

- IUCN category V (protected landscape/seascape)
- Location within Manitoba
- Location: Manitoba, Canada
- Nearest town: Pinawa, Manitoba
- Coordinates: 50°12′57″N 95°55′43″W
- Area: 250,000 m^{2} (62 acres)
- Established: 1985
- Governing body: Government of Manitoba
- Pinawa Dam
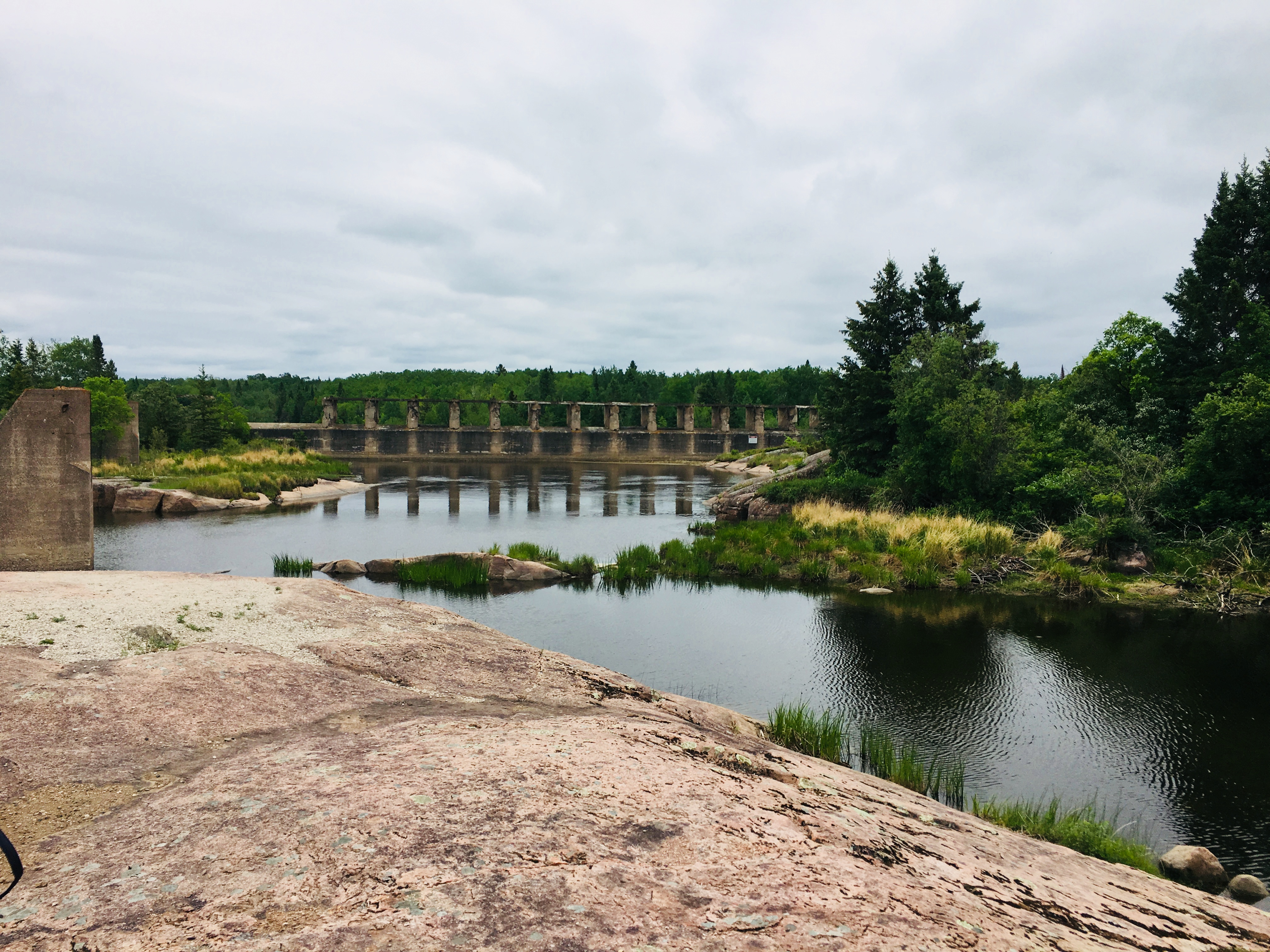
- Interactive map of Pinawa Dam
- Status: Decommissioned
- Opening date: 1906

Dam and spillways
- Impounds: Winnipeg River

Reservoir
- Creates: Pinawa Channel

Power Station
- Decommission date: 1951

Pinawa Dam Provincial Park is a provincial park located north of Pinawa, Manitoba, Canada, on Provincial Road 520, overlooking the Pinawa Channel.

It was designated a provincial park by the Government of Manitoba in 1985. The park is 250,000 square metres (62 acres) in size. The park is considered to be a Class V protected area under the IUCN protected area management categories.

The park is home to such fish species as walleye, northern pike, catfish, and smallmouth bass; and such animals as white-tailed deer, black bear, fox, and otter.

== History ==
Pinawa Dam, which began operating in 1906, was originally built to provide residential and commercial hydroelectric power for the city of Winnipeg.

The dam was closed in 1951 to allow for the Winnipeg River's full flow to enter the Seven Sisters Generating Station. Parts of the dam were later used for demolition practice by the Canadian Armed Forces, and were thereby destroyed.

The Pinawa Dam Provincial Park today includes the ruins of the former dam, through which water flows and forms rapids and waterfalls.

== See also ==
- List of Manitoba parks
- List of protected areas of Manitoba
