= Manigotagan, Manitoba =

Manigotagan
- Unincorporated community

- Location within Manitoba
- Coordinates: 51°06′32″N 96°18′17″W
- Country: Canada
- Province: Manitoba
- Census division: Division No. 19
- Census subdivision: Unorg. Div. No. 19

Area
  - Land: 37.06 km^{2} (14.31 sq mi)

Population (2021)
  - Total: 173
  - Density: 4.67/km^{2} (12.1/sq mi)
- Time zone: UTC-6 (CST)
  - Summer (DST): UTC-5 (CDT)
- Area codes: 204, 431, and 584

Manigotagan is a settlement in the Canadian province of Manitoba. It is located near the mouth of the Manigotagan River at Lake Winnipeg.

== History ==
From circa 1887 to circa 1893, the Hudson's Bay Company operated a fur trade outpost here, called Bad Throat Post, and functioned as an outpost for Fort Alexander. The exact date that it was abandoned is unknown.

== Demographics ==
In the 2021 Census of Population conducted by Statistics Canada, Manigotagan had a population of 173 living in 69 of its 273 total private dwellings, a change of −1.7% from its 2016 population of 176. With a land area of 37.06 km^{2} (14.31 sq mi), it had a population density of 4.7/km^{2} (12.1/sq mi) in 2021.

Historical census populations – Manigotagan, Manitoba

Year	Pop.	±%
1985	230	—
1991	197	−14.3%
1996	173	−12.2%
2001	192	+11.0%

Year	Pop.	±%
2006	191	−0.5%
2011	213	+11.5%
2016	176	−17.4%
2021	173	−1.7%

Population count for 2016 based on revised count from 2021.
Source: Statistics Canada, Government of Manitoba
