= Pointe du Bois, Manitoba =

Coordinates: 50°18′03″N 95°33′05″W

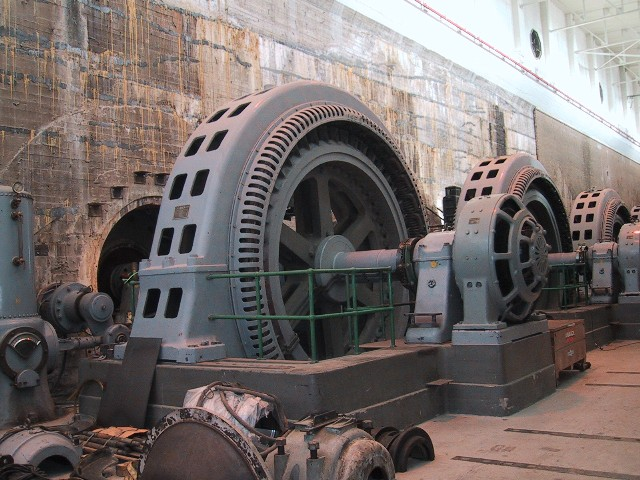
ASEA generators inside the Pointe du Bois generating station

Pointe du Bois was a small community located northeast of Winnipeg, Manitoba, in an unincorporated section of Census Division No. 1. Pointe du Bois has a Manitoba Hydro generating station (at ). The area provides great fishing for Walleye, Northern pike and smallmouth bass. In April 2013 its owner, Manitoba Hydro announced that it will close the community by 2015 and level it to the ground at a later date. The crown corporation cites the high cost of maintaining municipal infrastructure as the primary reason for its decision.

== Winnipeg Hydro Tramway ==
The tramway was originally built from a connection with the CPR at Lac du Bonnet to the City of Winnipeg's Pointe du Bois hydroelectric generating station on the Winnipeg River, to facilitate the transportation of construction materials and workers. Passenger service by conventional mixed train began in 1908. Beginning in late 1911 a series of a gasoline trams and rail buses provided most passenger service. An extension to the remote Slave Falls generating station opened in 1929. In 1962 the Pointe du Bois to Lac du Bonnet line was abandoned, ending common carrier passenger service. Passenger travel between the two dams continued by gasoline tram, but was not open to the public. A road was built between the two dams in 2011.

== Winnipeg Hydro ==
In 1906, The City of Winnipeg Hydro Electric System (City Hydro) was formed as a publicly owned utility to check the power monopoly held by the privately owned Winnipeg Electric railway company (WERCo). Alderman John Wesley Cockburn, who held development rights to the Pointe du Bois generating station site on the Winnipeg River, surrendered these rights to the City for construction of a power plant. The generating station was completed in 1911 and it is still in operation in late 2013.
