= Nopiming Provincial Park =

Provincial park in Manitoba, Canada

- IUCN category II (national park)
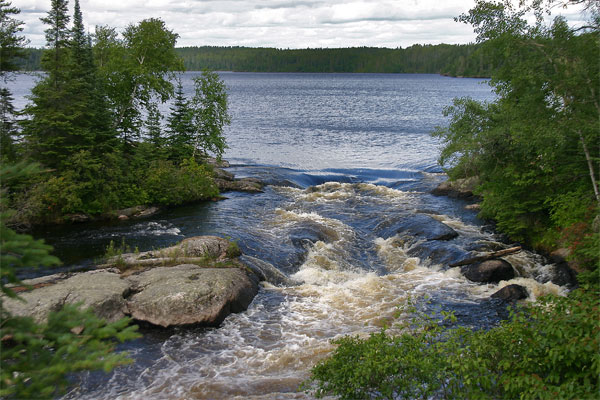
- Tulabi Falls

- Location within Manitoba
- Interactive map of Nopiming Provincial Park
- Location: Manitoba, Canada
- Nearest city: Winnipeg, Manitoba
- Coordinates: 50°38′2″N 95°19′38″W
- Area: 1,429 km^{2} (552 sq mi)
- Established: 1976
- Governing body: Government of Manitoba

Nopiming Provincial Park is a natural provincial park in Manitoba, Canada, located on the southeast side of the province, along the boundary with Ontario.

The area was designated a provincial park by the Government of Manitoba in 1976. The park is 1,429 square kilometres (552 sq mi) in size. It is considered a Class II protected area under the IUCN protected area management categories. The park preserves areas that are representative of the Lac Seul Upland portion of the Precambrian Boreal Forest natural region.

The park's name comes from the Anishinaabe word noopiming, meaning "in the woods/brush" used in reference to coming off a lake and heading inland. Another translation of Nopiming from the Anishinaabe (Saulteaux) language is "Entrance to the Wilderness".

== Description ==
Mother Loon feeding baby at Booster Lake.

The area is mostly boreal forest and Canadian Shield with many lakes and rivers. There are a few gravel roads through the park, camping facilities, hiking trails, and a few cottages. The area is very remote and the most southern herd of woodland caribou can be found here. Further to the north is Atikaki Provincial Wilderness Park with no roads. Almost the entire east side of Lake Winnipeg is wilderness, with a few First Nation communities and very few small towns.

Both Booster Lake and Springer Lake are located in Nopiming Provincial Park.

=== Beresford Lake ===
Beresford Lake (50.870556°N 95.234444°W) is in the park. The park has a campground that is made up of 28 sites including a boat launch. The lake is surrounded by boreal forest largely consisting of jack pine, poplar, tamarack, larch, black spruce, and birch. Wildlife present includes black bears and bald eagles. Fishing is a frequent activity, as is boating. The lakes are bordered with granite rock.

Beresford Lake was once the site of a gold mine, the Gunnar gold mine, in 1937.

== Film ==
A film titled Nopiming Provincial Park 2 was made about forestry in the park in 2010. In the video is said "This video is part of the Developing Forest Services project funded by the Academy of Finland (project # 12340). It is intended to create dialogue about forest conflicts and use, and our conception of forests".

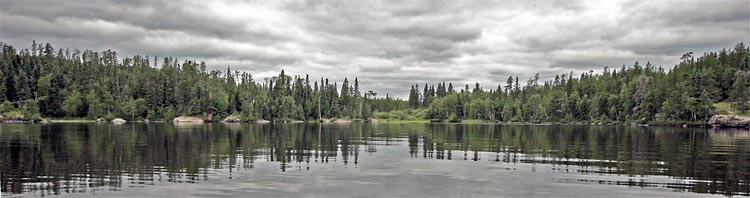
Booster Lake in Nopiming Provincial Park.

== See also ==
- List of protected areas of Manitoba
