= Turtle Mountain (plateau) =

Plateau on the US-Canadian border

- Plateau
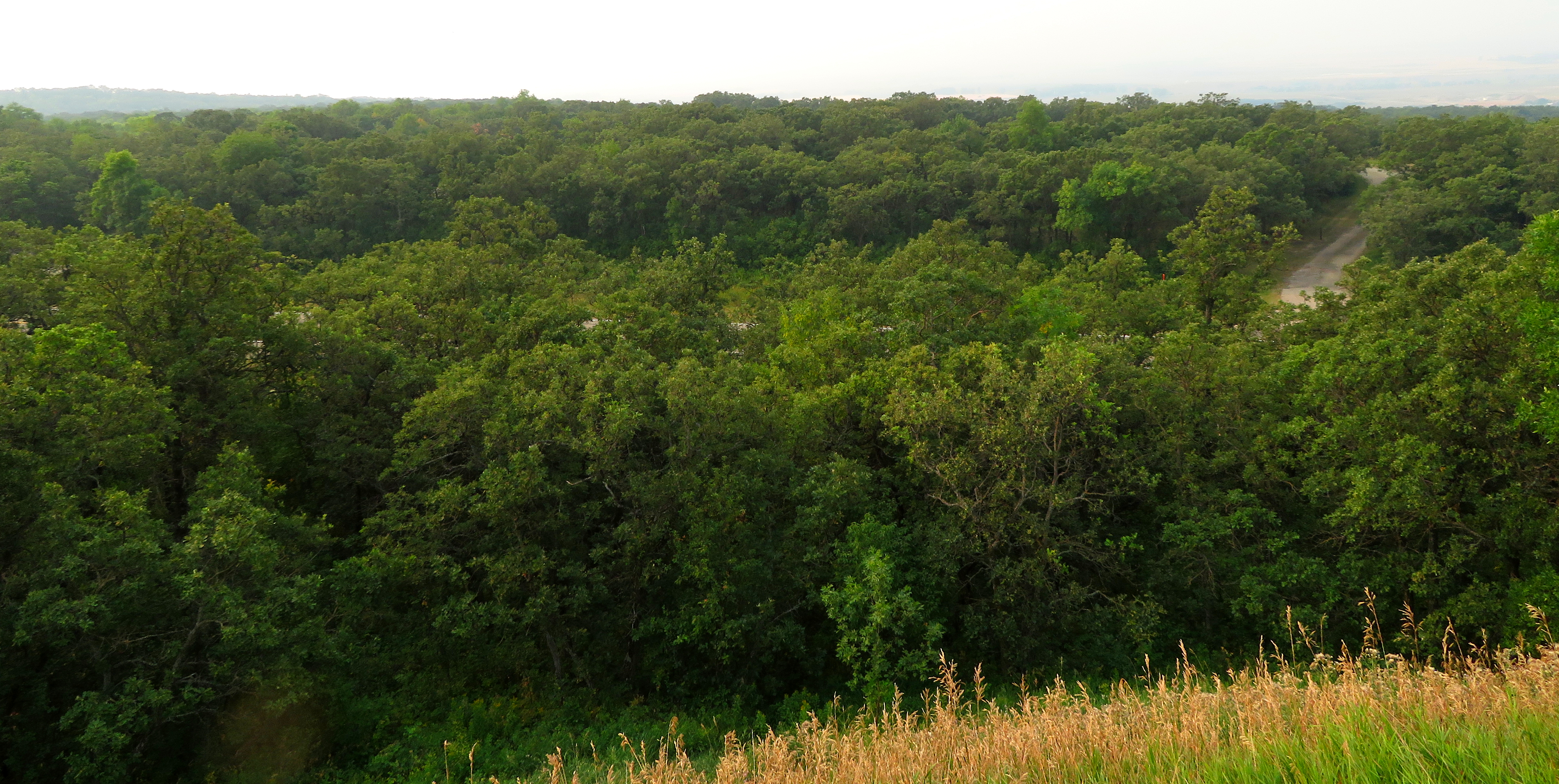
- View across Turtle Mountain in Turtle Mountain State Forest, North Dakota

- Location within the United States Location within Canada
- Coordinates: 48°58′00″N 100°07′30″W
- Location: North Dakota (U.S.) and Manitoba (Canada)
- Elevation: 610 m (2,000 ft)
- Topo map: NTS 62F1 Deloraine

Turtle Mountain, or the Turtle Mountains, is a geographical uplift in central North America, in the north-central portion of the U.S. state of North Dakota and the southwestern portion of the Canadian province of Manitoba, approximately 62 miles (100 km) south of the city of Brandon on Manitoba Highway 10 / U.S. Route 281. It is a plateau about 2,000 feet (600 m) above sea level and 300 to 400 feet (90 to 120 m) above the surrounding countryside, extending approximately 20 miles (32 km) from north to south and 40 miles (64 km) from east to west. Rising 1,031 feet (314 m), North Dakota's most prominent peak, Boundary Butte, is located at the western edge of the plateau.

The Turtle Mountains contain large amounts of timber, numerous lakes, and small deposits of low-grade manganese. One of the largest lakes in the Turtle Mountains is Lake Metigoshe, which straddles the international border, with about one-eighth of the lake in Canada. The region is home to Lake Metigoshe State Park, Turtle Mountain Provincial Park, two historic sites, and various hunting and fishing opportunities.

The Turtle Mountains are the traditional territory of the Plains Ojibwe, as well as part of the Métis homeland. Rapid colonization and settlement in the 19th century, along with the establishment of a firm border between Canada and the United States, displaced many Indigenous peoples to and from the region. Some identify as the Turtle Mountain Chippewa, who are federally recognized and whose reservation is in the valley on the southeastern edge of the plateau.

== History ==
The Plains Ojibwe have a long established history in the Turtle Mountain region and the surrounding area. East of Turtle Mountain at Pembina lived one Ojibwe group as well as a number of Métis families. The Métis hunted and fished in the Turtle Mountains and increasingly moved westward from Pembina in search of declining buffalo populations. When the federal government agreed that Pembina would be a part of the United States in 1818, the Métis living there, along with a number of Chippewa with kinship ties to the Métis and some Ojibwe, claimed land near Turtle Mountain. The U.S. federal government recognized and designated this group the Pembina Band of Chippewa Indians, but this did not include all the Ojibwe peoples already established at Turtle Mountain. The misidentification of all Ojibwe as part of the Pembina Band has prevented full assertion of their rights. Throughout the 19th century, the Pembina Band was broken up and dispossessed of their lands as the government opened up the area for settlement. Among these groups are the Turtle Mountain Chippewa and the Little Shell Tribe of Chippewa.

== Environment ==
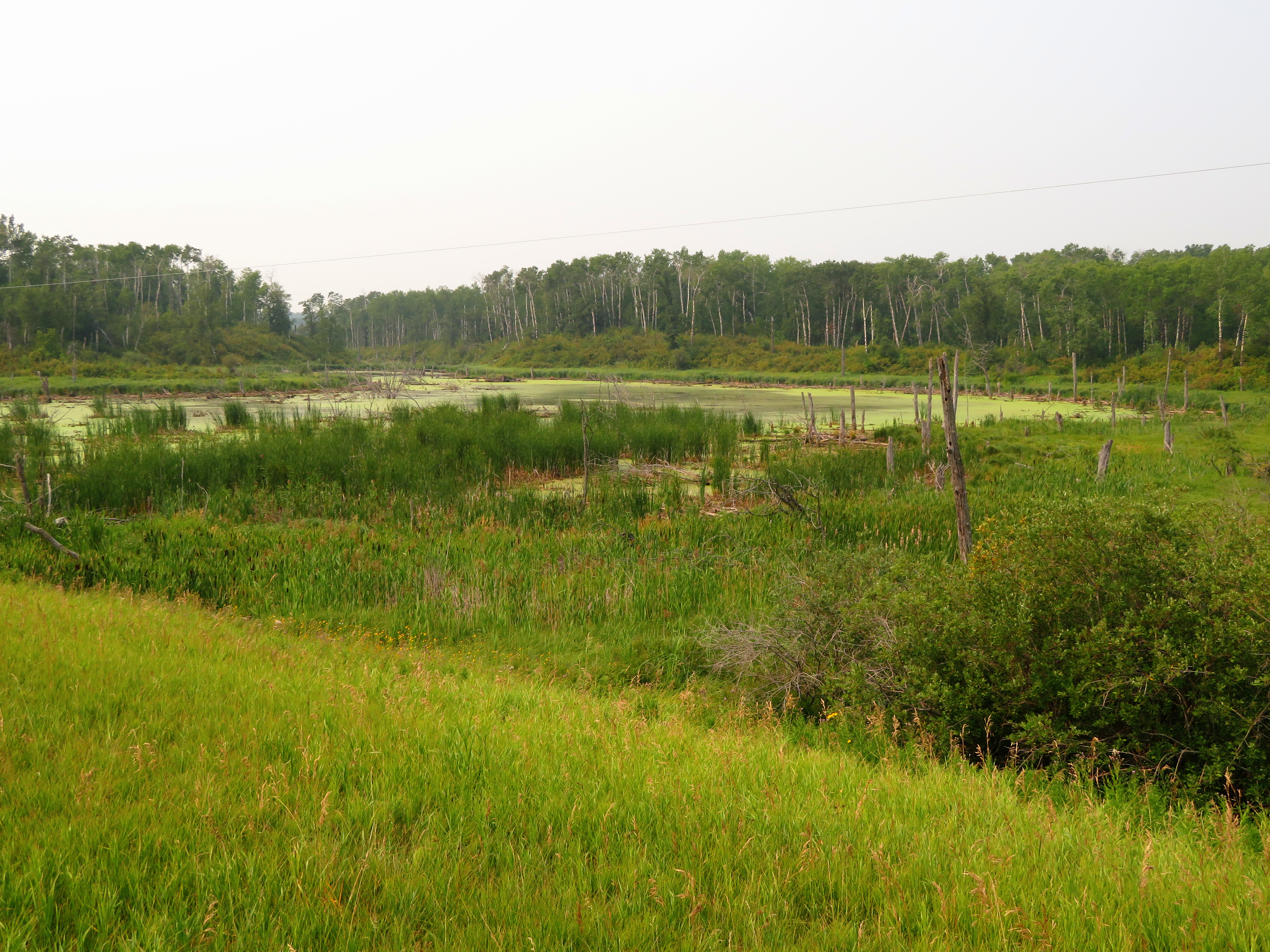
Mixedwood forest wetland in Turtle Mountain Provincial Park, Manitoba

=== Wildlife ===
The Turtle Mountain area is covered by deciduous forest. Woodland overstory species are primarily green ash (Fraxinus pennsylvanica), quaking aspen (Populus tremuloides), Manitoba maple (Acer negundo), American elm (Ulmus americana), paper birch (Betula papyrifera), bur oak (Quercus macrocarpa), and balsam poplar (Populus balsamifera). Common shrubs in the forest understory include beaked hazel (Corylus cornuta), chokecherry (Prunus virginiana), saskatoon berry (Amelanchier alnifolia), nannyberry (Viburnum lentago), dogwood (Cornus sericea), highbush cranberry (Viburnum trilobum) and pincherry (Prunus pensylvanica). The area near Mary Lake includes the spotted coralroot orchid (Corallorhiza maculata) and calypso orchid (Calypso bulbosa). Most of the soils in the United States sector have been mapped as dark brown loamy Alfisols of the Kevin Series. In Canada, soils are dark gray chernozems of the Horton Series or orthic gray Luvisols of the Turtle Mountain Series. Turtle Mountain is home to moose (Alces alces), white-tailed deer (Odocoileus virginianus), beaver (Castor canadensis), raccoon (Procyon lotor) and mink (Neogale vison), as well as birds like loons (Gavia sp.), great blue heron (Ardea herodias herodias), black-crowned night heron (Nycticorax nycticorax), the double-crested cormorant (Nannopterum auritum) and red-necked grebes (Podiceps grisegena). The abundant small lakes support painted turtles (Chrysemys picta), wood frogs (Lithobates sylvaticus), northern leopard frogs (Lithobates pipiens), and the barred tiger salamander (Ambystoma mavortium).

=== Coal mining ===
Following the discovery of coal in 1879, there was coal mining in the Turtle Mountains near the Old Deloraine town site in Manitoba and along ravines on the western flank of the plateau. The Lennox mine opened in 1883 and mining continued intermittently at the Voden, McArthur, McKay, and Manitoba Coal Company mines until 1908. When higher quality coal was found elsewhere and the Trans-Canada Railway was built, the mines closed. Small-scale coal mining was revived during the Depression because Turtle Mountain lignite was cheaper than higher coal grades from Saskatchewan. Peak annual production of the McArthur, Henderson, Deep Ravine, Salter, Powne, and Deloraine Coal Company mines averaged over 1,000 tons each. However, the Salter and Henderson mines produced 95% of Manitoba's coal over a span of about eight years. The last mine closed in 1943 due to labour shortages during World War II and changed economic conditions. The old Deloraine town site is now covered by a man-made lake, made when the Turtle-Head Dam was built.

=== Climate ===
Climate Station in Southern Manitoba, Canada.

Climate data for Turtle Mountain Station 6
Month	Jan	Feb	Mar	Apr	May	Jun	Jul	Aug	Sep	Oct	Nov	Dec	Year
Record high °C (°F)	6.0 (42.8)	15.5 (59.9)	19.5 (67.1)	33.0 (91.4)	36.5 (97.7)	38.0 (100.4)	37.5 (99.5)	41.0 (105.8)	34.5 (94.1)	33.0 (91.4)	22.0 (71.6)	8.5 (47.3)	41.0 (105.8)
Mean daily maximum °C (°F)	−9.4 (15.1)	−6.2 (20.8)	0.5 (32.9)	11.9 (53.4)	19.3 (66.7)	23.1 (73.6)	25.8 (78.4)	25.7 (78.3)	19.6 (67.3)	11.3 (52.3)	−0.3 (31.5)	−7.5 (18.5)	9.5 (49.1)
Daily mean °C (°F)	−14.6 (5.7)	−11.7 (10.9)	−4.8 (23.4)	5.2 (41.4)	12.0 (53.6)	16.6 (61.9)	19.0 (66.2)	18.4 (65.1)	12.6 (54.7)	4.9 (40.8)	−5.1 (22.8)	−12.4 (9.7)	3.4 (38.1)
Mean daily minimum °C (°F)	−19.7 (−3.5)	−17.1 (1.2)	−10.2 (13.6)	−1.6 (29.1)	4.6 (40.3)	10.0 (50.0)	12.2 (54.0)	11.1 (52.0)	5.5 (41.9)	−1.4 (29.5)	−9.8 (14.4)	−17.2 (1.0)	−2.8 (27.0)
Record low °C (°F)	−43.0 (−45.4)	−43.0 (−45.4)	−36.5 (−33.7)	−24.0 (−11.2)	−14.0 (6.8)	−1.0 (30.2)	2.5 (36.5)	−0.5 (31.1)	−6.5 (20.3)	−23.5 (−10.3)	−33.0 (−27.4)	−41.5 (−42.7)	−43.0 (−45.4)
Average precipitation mm (inches)	19.0 (0.75)	14.7 (0.58)	25.5 (1.00)	26.1 (1.03)	61.2 (2.41)	85.6 (3.37)	82.0 (3.23)	66.7 (2.63)	41.5 (1.63)	37.3 (1.47)	24.3 (0.96)	21.2 (0.83)	504.9 (19.88)
Average rainfall mm (inches)	0.0 (0.0)	0.5 (0.02)	6.1 (0.24)	15.4 (0.61)	56.6 (2.23)	85.6 (3.37)	82.0 (3.23)	66.7 (2.63)	41.1 (1.62)	28.7 (1.13)	4.5 (0.18)	1.1 (0.04)	388.0 (15.28)
Average snowfall cm (inches)	19.1 (7.5)	14.2 (5.6)	19.2 (7.6)	10.6 (4.2)	4.6 (1.8)	0.0 (0.0)	0.0 (0.0)	0.0 (0.0)	0.3 (0.1)	8.7 (3.4)	19.9 (7.8)	20.3 (8.0)	116.9 (46.0)
Source: Environment Canada

== Communities in the area ==
- Belcourt, North Dakota
- Boissevain, Manitoba
- Bottineau, North Dakota
- Deloraine, Manitoba
- Dunseith, North Dakota
- East Dunseith, North Dakota
- Green Acres, North Dakota
- Rolla, North Dakota
- St. John, North Dakota
- Shell Valley, North Dakota
- Killarney, Manitoba

== Counties and rural municipalities ==
- Bottineau County, North Dakota
- Rolette County, North Dakota
- Rural Municipality of Morton, Manitoba
- Rural Municipality of Turtle Mountain, Manitoba
- Rural Municipality of Winchester, Manitoba

== Parks ==
- International Peace Garden
- Lake Metigoshe State Park
- Rabb Lake National Wildlife Refuge
- School Section Lake National Wildlife Refuge
- Turtle Mountain Provincial Park
- William Lake Provincial Park
- Willow Lake National Wildlife Refuge

== Notable sites ==
- International Peace Garden
- Bottineau Winter Park, a modest alpine ski area with a vertical drop of 250 feet (76 m), is in the western part of the plateau.
