= Whitewater Lake, Manitoba =

Lake in Manitoba

Whitewater Lake
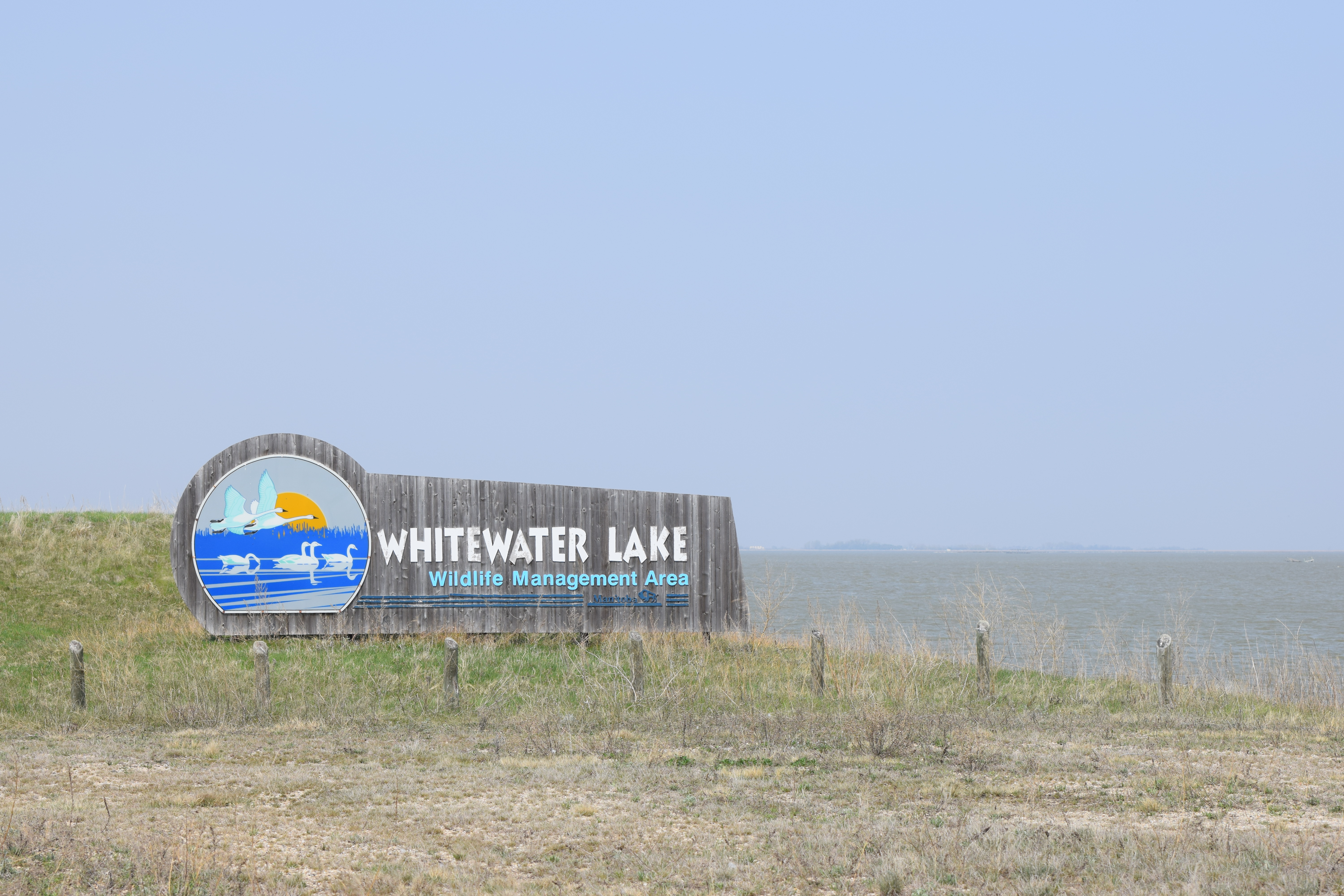
- The former sign at the Whitewater Lake WMA on the south side of the Lake.

- Location within Manitoba
- Location: Municipality of Deloraine – Winchester / Municipality of Boissevain – Morton rural municipalities, Manitoba, Canada
- Coordinates: 49°14′17″N 100°19′25″W
- Lake type: Endorheic basin
- Basin countries: Canada
- Surface area: 139.75 square kilometres (53.96 mi^{2})
- Average depth: 2 metres (6.6 ft)
- Surface elevation: 1,628 ft (496 m)

Whitewater Lake is a lake in the Canadian province of Manitoba located between Boissevain and Deloraine. It is an endorheic basin and more marsh than lake. Whitewater Lake was previously called White Lake due to the color of the salt flats exposed during dry periods. Whitewater Lake covers approximately 22,000 acres on average and only reaches depths of about 2 metres (6.6 ft). The lake is fed by several small streams which flow into it from the Turtle Mountains but has no natural outflow.

The alkaline lake was vulnerable to drought having dried up several times including 1857, 1913–1915, 1934-1940 and 1989–1992. In 1989 Ducks Unlimited Canada began partnering with Manitoba Conservation and other partners to enhance the sustainability of the lake, investing more than two million over the following years. Dikes and water control structures were added to the east side of the lake to ensure the permanency of the water even during dry years.

As of 2016, Whitewater Lake was at a peak of 1633 ft which is five feet above the average long-term level. These high levels have seen the lake claim more farm land and resulted in significant erosion of the dike and park space structures on the lake's southeast side.

== Water sources and quality ==
The lake is fed by eight major creeks originating from the Turtle Mountains to the south. As an endorheic basin with no natural outlet the water is considered moderately brackish. The water quality is mostly affected by sodium sulfate and magnesium sulfate. High winds of 35 miles per hour (56 km/h) or above can affect lake levels on the shallow lake, with wind tides raising levels nearly one foot in the direction of the gusts and can push water inshore up to 200 metres (660 ft). This wind effect can devastate nesting sites in the Important Bird Area (IBA).

== Whitewater Lake WMA ==
The Whitewater Lake Wildlife Management Area (WMA) is 8,257 hectares in size. It includes Whitewater Lake and a managed marsh east of the lake. A wildlife viewing site was developed at the southwest corner of the managed marsh cells. However high water levels between 2010-2019 led to the area being eroded and the signs and viewing sites were disassembled.

== Whitewater Lake IBA ==
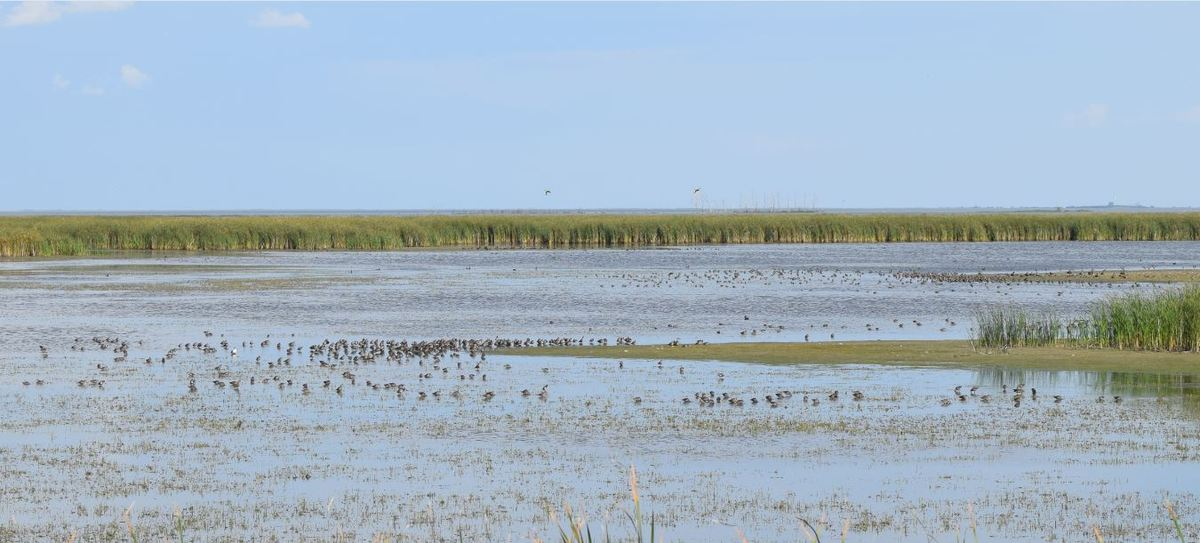
A flock of 200+ short-billed dowitchers on the west side of Whitewater Lake.

Whitewater Lake is designated a globally significant Important Bird Area (IBA) by Bird Studies Canada because of the number of waterfowl and shorebirds that congregate there during migration. Huge numbers of waterfowl, including a significant number of Snow geese and Tundra swans, have been observed during fall migration. The largest shorebird concentrations in southern Manitoba occur on this lake when water levels are low. In 1988, 10,000 White-rumped sandpipers were recorded there; 2.5% of the known winter population of the species.

Whitewater Lake is nationally significant as a nesting site for Black-crowned night herons with 1.7% of the estimated Canadian population for this species recorded nesting there. Other significant nesting populations include Franklin's gulls and Eared grebes.
