= International Peace Garden Border Crossing =

Border crossing between Canada and the United States

International Peace Garden Border Crossing Poste frontalier de Dunseith-Boissevain
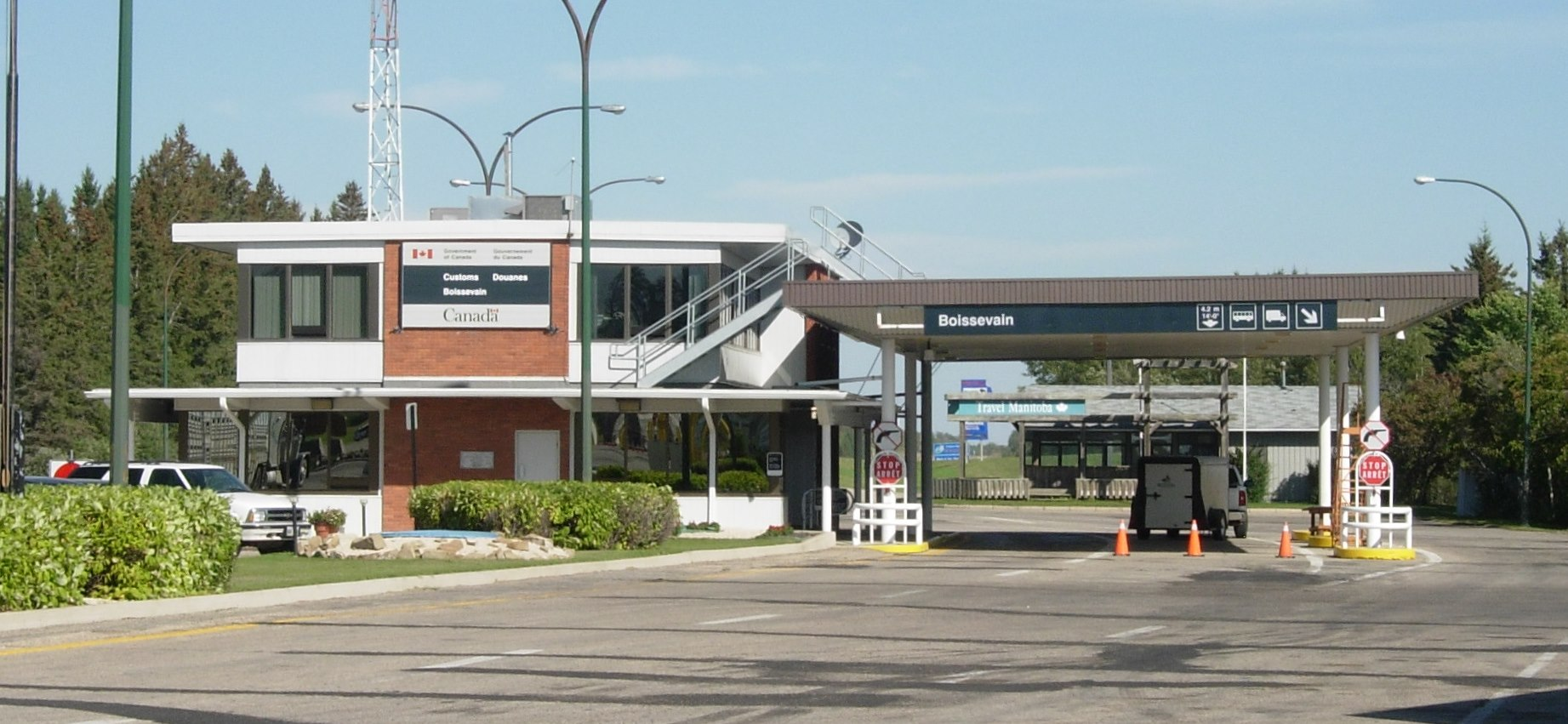
- The Canada Border Inspection Station at the International Peace Garden Border Crossing

Location
- Country: United States; Canada
- Location: US 281 / ND 3 / PTH 10 at International Peace Garden; US Port: 10947 US Route 281 / North Dakota Highway 3, Dunseith, North Dakota 58329; Canadian Port: Manitoba Highway 10, Boissevain, Manitoba R0K 0E0
- Coordinates: 48.999288°N 100.052377°W

Details
- Opened: 1930

Website
- http://www.cbp.gov/contact/ports/dunseith

The International Peace Garden Border Crossing (French: Poste frontière international du Jardin de la Paix), also known as the Dunseith–Boissevain Border Crossing, is a crossing on the Canada–United States border connecting the towns of Boissevain, Manitoba and Dunseith, North Dakota. The border crossing is adjacent to the International Peace Garden, which was dedicated in 1932, just two years after this crossing was established as a port of entry. It is one of two ports of entry between Manitoba and North Dakota with 24-hour service.

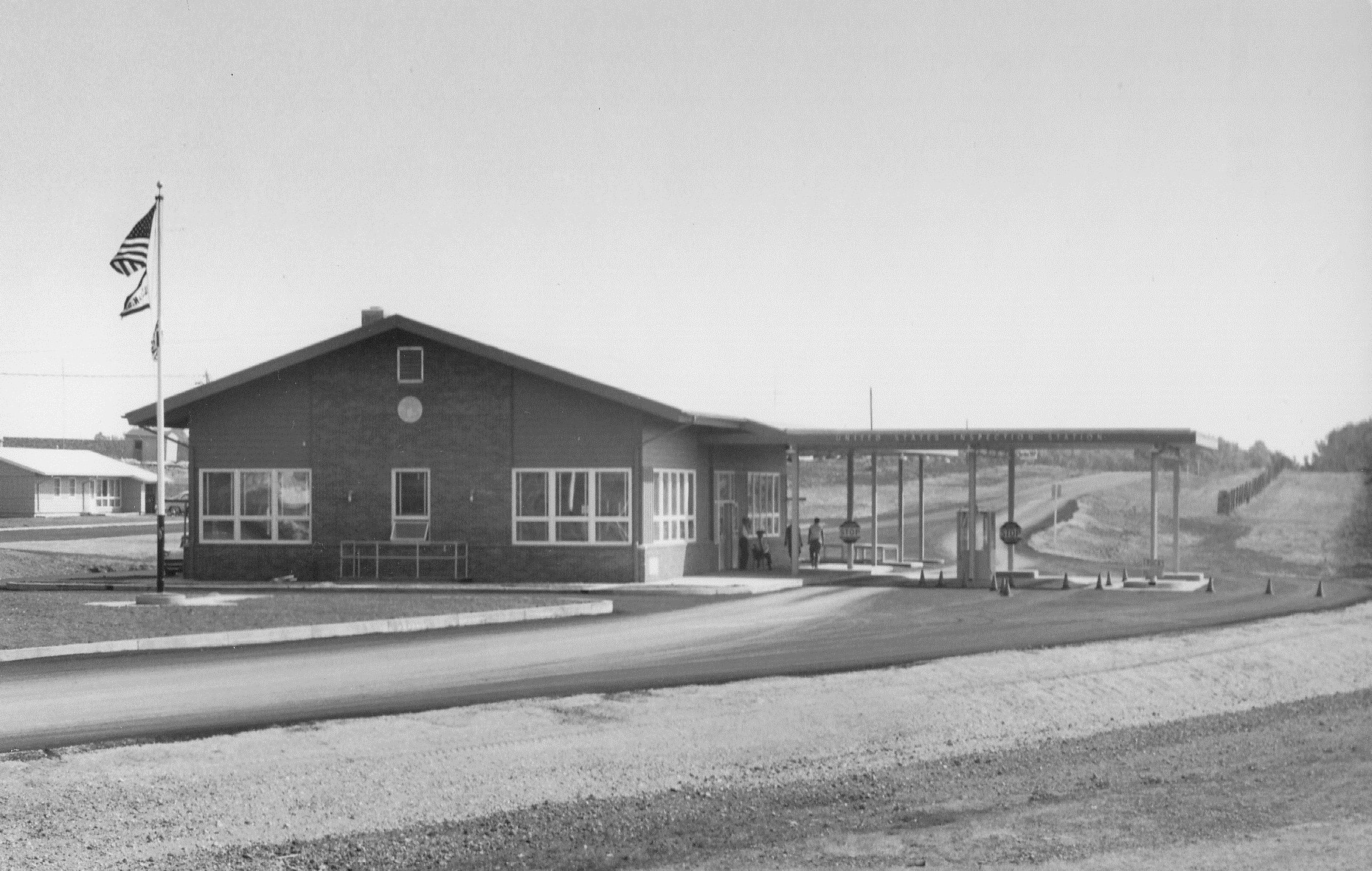
U.S. border station at the Peace Garden border crossing as seen in 1961

The crossing is connected by U.S. Route 281 and North Dakota Highway 3 in Rolette County, North Dakota on the American side and Manitoba Highway 10 in the Municipality of Boissevain – Morton on the Canadian side. The entrance and exit to the Peace Garden is directly on the international border between the two border stations. This allows visitors to enter the park without reporting to either border station. Visitors are permitted unrestricted movement within the park but must go through the customs and immigration procedures in either country after leaving the garden.

International Peace Garden Airport, a public-use airport for general aviation aircraft with no more than 15 passengers, is located to the east of the garden on the U.S. side of the border.

== See also ==
- List of Canada–United States border crossings
