= Rural Municipality of Morton =

Rural municipality in Manitoba, Canada

Coordinates: 49°10′39″N 100°05′43″W

The Rural Municipality of Morton is a former rural municipality (RM) in the Canadian province of Manitoba. It was originally incorporated as a rural municipality on November 1, 1890. It ceased on January 1, 2015, as a result of its provincially mandated amalgamation with the Town of Boissevain to form the Municipality of Boissevain – Morton.

The former RM was located in the southwestern part of the province, on the border with the state of North Dakota in the United States. Its population in the 2006 census was 718 persons, a decrease from 760 persons in 2001. The International Peace Garden is located partially in the territory of the former RM of Morton, along the North Dakota border. Most of Manitoba's Turtle Mountain Provincial Park lies in the southwest corner of the former RM.

== Communities ==
- Whitewater

== Geography ==
According to Statistics Canada, the former RM had an area of 1,089.88 km^{2} (420.8 sq mi).

=== Adjacent municipalities ===
- R.M. of Winchester - (west)
- R.M. of Whitewater - (north)
- R.M. of Riverside - (northeast)
- R.M. of Turtle Mountain - (east)
- Rolette County, North Dakota - (south, southeast)
- Bottineau County, North Dakota - (southwest)
