= Dand, Manitoba =

Dand
- Location of Dand in Manitoba
- Coordinates: 49°20′24″N 100°30′0″W
- Country: Canada
- Province: Manitoba
- Region: Westman
- Census Division: No. 5

Government
  - Governing Body: Municipality of Deloraine-Winchester Council
  - MP: Grant Jackson
  - MLA: Doyle Piwniuk
- Time zone: UTC−6 (CST)
  - Summer (DST): UTC−5 (CDT)
- Area codes: 204, 431
- NTS Map: 062F08
- GNBC Code: GAGCB

Dand is an unincorporated community in southwestern Manitoba, Canada. It is located approximately 17 kilometers (10 miles) north of Deloraine, Manitoba, within the former Rural Municipality of Winchester and now Municipality of Deloraine - Winchester.
