= Nanson =

Nanson may refer to:

Places

- Nanson, North Dakota, an unincorporated community in the United States
- Nanson, Western Australia, a town in Australia

People

- Edward J. Nanson (1850–1936), English mathematician in Australia
- John Nanson (1863–1916), West Australian politician
- William Nanson, English rugby player
- A misspelling of Fridtjof Nansen's surname
