= William Morton (tenor) =

Canadian opera singer

William Jacob Morton (27 September 1912 – 10 February 1995) was a Canadian tenor, opera director, and voice teacher born in Deloraine, Manitoba. He first studied singing with Alicia Birkett in Regina, and later with Albert Whitehead and James Rosselino in Toronto. He made his professional singing debut in 1932 and made his debut radio broadcast in 1933 on CKCK. He was a regular on CBC Radio from the mid-1930s through the 1950s and was also one of the leading tenors of the CBC Opera Company during the 1940s. With the CBC he notably performed the title role in the Canadian premiere of Benjamin Britten's Peter Grimes in 1949. From 1942 to 1951 he was a member of the CBC vocal quartet the Four Gentlemen which were a main feature of the radio program 'Carry On Canada'. In the 1950s he moved to Vancouver and was offered tenure by UBC but rejected. Later in the 50s he founded the Vancouver Opera Society. He died in February 1995 at the age of 82.
