= Fonda, North Dakota =

Unincorporated community in North Dakota, U.S.

Fonda
- Unincorporated community
- Location within North Dakota
- Coordinates: 48°40′11″N 100°1′7″W
- Country: United States
- State: North Dakota
- County: Rolette
- Founded: 1905
- Founder: Jay Edwards
- Named for: Fonda, Iowa

Fonda is an unincorporated community in Rolette County, in the U.S. state of North Dakota.

== History ==
Fonda was founded in 1905. A post office called Fonda was established in 1907, and remained in operation until 1944. The community was named for Fonda, Iowa, former home of early settler Jay Edwards. The population was 13 in 1940.
