= Thorne, North Dakota =

Unincorporated community in North Dakota, United States

Coordinates: 48°44′21″N 99°55′54″W

Thorne is an unincorporated community in Rolette County, in the U.S. state of North Dakota.

== History ==
Thorne was laid out in 1905. A number of the first settlers being natives of Thorne, England caused the name to be selected. A post office was established at Thorne in 1905, and remained in operation until it was discontinued in 1965.

Historical population
Census	Pop.	Note	%±
1910	105		—
1920	78		−25.7%
1930	38		−51.3%
1940	45		18.4%
1950	37		−17.8%
U.S. Decennial Census
