= Lords Lake National Wildlife Refuge =

Protected area in North Dakota, United States

Coordinates: 48°46′46″N 100°11′43″W

Lords Lake National Wildlife Refuge is a National Wildlife Refuge in Bottineau and Rolette counties, North Dakota. It is managed under J. Clark Salyer National Wildlife Refuge.

This is a limited-interest national wildlife refuge. The FWS has an easement on private property allowing it to manage wildlife habitat, but the land remains private property. There is no public access although wildlife may be observed from adjacent public roads. Limited-interest refuges were created in the 1930s and 1940s in response to declining waterfowl populations and the need to get people back to work during the Great Depression. Many landowners sold easements allowing the federal government to regulate water levels and restrict hunting.
