= Carpenter, North Dakota =

Unincorporated community in North Dakota, United States

- Unincorporated community
- Location within the state of North Dakota Carpenter, North Dakota (the United States)
- Coordinates: 48°57′35″N 99°58′37″W
- Country: United States
- State: North Dakota
- County: Rolette
- Time zone: UTC-6 (Central (CST))
  - Summer (DST): UTC-5 (CDT)
- Area code: 701

Carpenter is an unincorporated community in Rolette County, North Dakota, United States.

== History ==
It was established with the opening of the Carpenter post office on April 9, 1903 at the general merchandise store of Anton T. Julseth in Holmes Township. The post office was named for nearby Carpenter Lake, which memorialized a prominent 1878 settler of French ancestry, Henri Charpentier, who drowned in the lake in 1888. Charpentier's surname is sometimes rendered "Scharpenter" in contemporary records; Carpenter is the English transliteration. Carpenter is located in the north-northwest of the county, 11 miles west-northwest of Saint John, North Dakota, near the border with Manitoba Province, Canada. Carpenter had a population of 15 in 1940, and 25 in 1960.
