= William Lake Provincial Park =

Provincial park in Manitoba, Canada

William Lake Provincial Park is a provincial park located in the Rural Municipality of Morton, in southwest Manitoba on Turtle Mountain (49.041°N 99.973°W). Its sister park, the much larger Turtle Mountain Provincial Park, lies to the west.

The park is centered on William Lake (49.04°N 99.976944°W). It is one of two lakes in Manitoba named William Lake; the other is located in Northern Manitoba near Little Limestone Lake.

Park amenities include a campground, a beach, and hiking trails.

== Turtle's Back Hiking Trail ==
The trail route passes through the surrounding Turtle Mountain Community Pasture. It is 6.9 kilometres (4.3 mi) in length and moderate in difficulty. The trail climbs to the 'Turtle's Back', giving hikers views of the surrounding area.

== Turtle Mountain Community Pasture ==
Turtle Mountain Community Pasture
- IUCN category VI (protected area with sustainable use of natural resources)
- Location: Manitoba, Canada
- Nearest town: Boissevain, Manitoba
- Area: 89.33 km^{2} (34.49 sq mi)
- Established: 1960
- Governing body: Government of Manitoba

The community pasture is 89.33 square kilometres (34.49 sq mi) in size. It is considered to be a Class VI protected area under the IUCN protected area management categories. Since 2016, the pasture has been managed by the Association of Manitoba Community Pastures.

== See also ==
- Prairie Farm Rehabilitation Administration
