= Rural Municipality of Winchester =

Rural municipality in Manitoba, Canada

Coordinates: 49°10′39″N 100°25′56″W

The Rural Municipality of Winchester is a former rural municipality (RM) in the Canadian province of Manitoba. It was originally incorporated as a rural municipality on November 1, 1890. It ceased on January 1, 2015 as a result of its provincially mandated amalgamation with the Town of Deloraine to form the Municipality of Deloraine – Winchester.

The former RM is located in the southwestern part of the province, on its border with the state of North Dakota in the United States. It had a population of 594 in the 2006 census.

== Geography ==
According to Statistics Canada, the former RM had an area of 725.58 km^{2} (280.15 sq mi). A portion of Manitoba's Turtle Mountain Provincial Park is located at the southeast corner of the former RM along its border with North Dakota.

=== Communities ===
- Dand
- Mountainside
- Regent

=== Adjacent municipalities ===
- Rural Municipality of Brenda - (west)
- Rural Municipality of Cameron - (north)
- Rural Municipality of Morton - (east)
- Bottineau County, North Dakota - (south)
