= Deloraine, Manitoba =

Deloraine
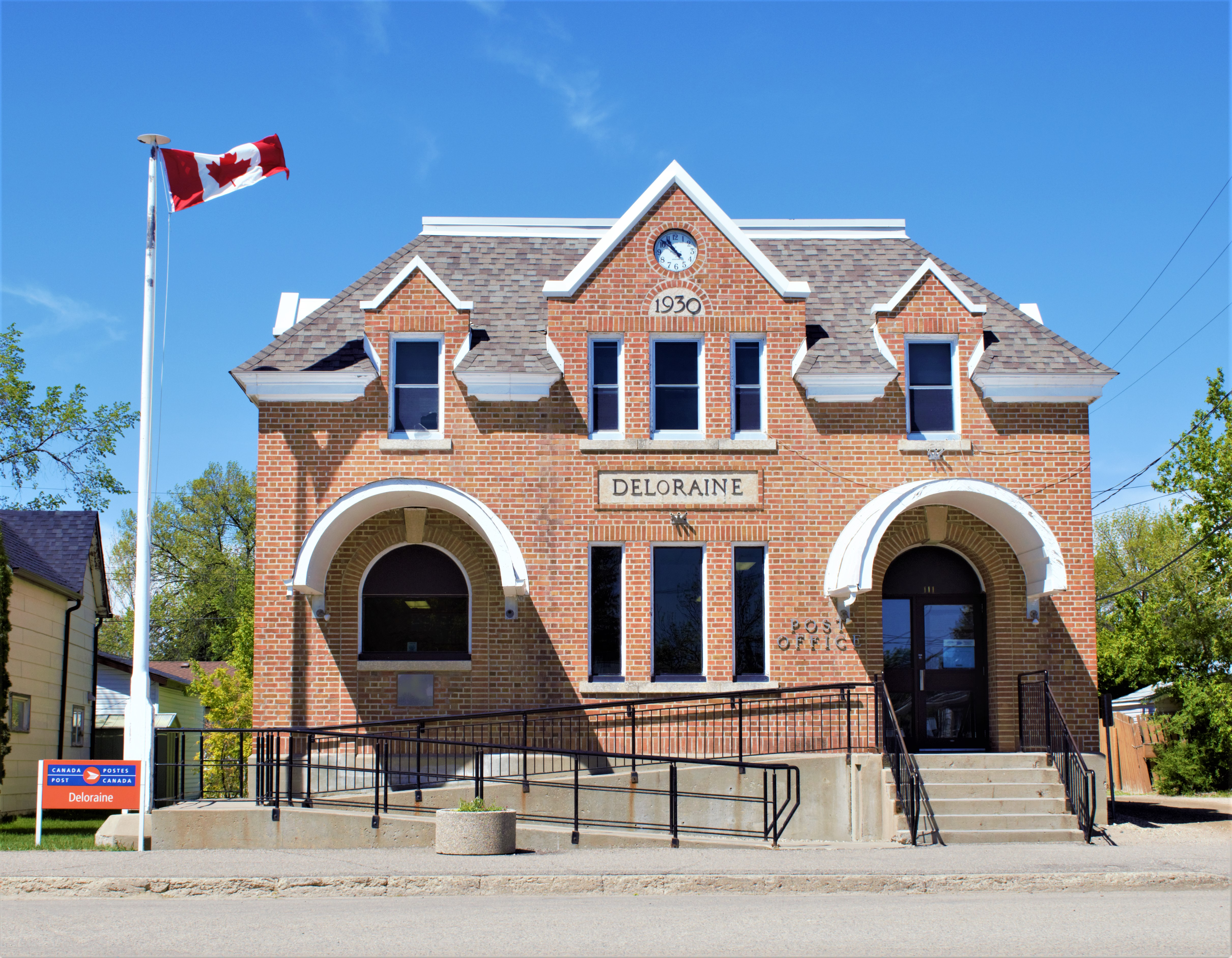
- The post office in Deloraine, constructed 1930

- Location within Manitoba
- Coordinates: 49°11′27″N 100°29′38″W
- Country: Canada
- Province: Manitoba
- Municipality: Deloraine-Winchester
- Village: March 1, 1904
- Town: May 1, 1907
- Amalgamation: January 1, 2015

Area
  - Land: 2.52 km^{2} (0.97 sq mi)

Population (2021)
  - Total: 962
  - Density: 382.2/km^{2} (990/sq mi)
- Time zone: UTC−05:00 (CST)
  - Summer (DST): UTC−06:00 (CDT)
- Postal code: R0M 0M0
- Website: http://delowin.ca/

Deloraine is an unincorporated urban community in the Municipality of Deloraine-Winchester within the Canadian province of Manitoba that held town status prior to January 1, 2015. It is situated near the Turtle Mountains in the southwestern corner of the province. Located in the Westman Region, the community is 100 km (62 mi) south of Brandon. Deloraine originally incorporated as a village in 1904 and then as a town in 1907. Its town status was relinquished in 2015 when it amalgamated with the Rural Municipality of Winchester.

Deloraine is named after a village in Roxburghshire, Scotland.

== History ==
The area of Deloraine was originally home to the Assiniboine and the later the Hunkpapa, whose lives were centred around the plains bison herds. A town site was established in 1883 along the Boundary Commission Trail and a post office was built in the general store by postmaster James Cavers, which he named Deloraine after the district in Scotland from where he emigrated from, and so the town would get its name.

The railway arrived north of the old town site in 1884 as part of the Canadian Pacific Railway and by 1886, ran from Deloraine, to Boissevain and then eastward to La Riviere. As the railway ran westward from Boissevain, the decision was made to move the town site from its old site along the Boundary Commission Trail to the present location alongside the railway. The move was made over the period of a month in late 1886 when merchants, millers, blacksmiths, implement dealers, and the post office, all moved to take up lots at the new northern town site. Deloraine immediately replaced Boissevain as the grain shipping centre of southwestern Manitoba, taking grain shipments from as far away as Carnduff. Passenger train service also took place on a train called the 'Blue Flea' which ran along a line from Lyleton at the United States border, to Deloraine, and terminating at Lauder. Passenger service was directed to the major centre of Winnipeg through Lyleton. In 1887, the Hudson's Bay Company opened a fur trade post and store (closing sometime after 1908).

The federal government's efforts to settle the area led many Belgian settlers to arrive in 1888 and in even greater numbers in 1892. By 1893 the land office closed its doors as the efforts to settle the area were completed. In 1897 the local methodist congregation got together and decided to build a new church, and in 1897 the church was constructed. The large building endured for many years but was destroyed by fire in 1951 and replaced with a new structure. A second church, the Deloraine Presbyterian Church was also constructed beginning in 1896 and completed a year later, it still stands today. Deloraine incorporated as a village on March 1, 1904 and then incorporated as a town on May 1, 1907. Mennonite settlers arrived in the area in 1920, on properties south and east of the town. Chinese Canadians were also long a part of the town, primarily working in the restaurant and laundry sectors.

The Deloraine Agricultural Society had formed in 1888 and a fair grounds created, the agricultural society created a half-mile track which hosted harness racing. In 1928 a grand stand was built on the site as the post-war popularity of the fairs and races spiked when they were restarted following World War I. Like many prairie communities, Deloraine was profoundly and negatively affected by the Great Depression. The community did see some growth in this decade through stimulus efforts when the Canadian government built the new Dominion Post Office Building in 1930. The community endured the decade until better times both economically and environmentally returned around 1939.

Like many small towns and cities across the country, Deloraine was profoundly impacted by World War II. In the early years of the war, many funds were raised and victory bonds and victory loans were sold to support the war efforts in Europe. Victory Loan Campaigns in Deloraine began in 1941, a second and third in 1942. As the war proceeded, many homes in 1944 were emptier as servicemen were away fighting the war in England, Belgium, and France. In spring of 1945 as end of the war was anticipated, a celebration was planned. With the arrival of VE Day on May 7 and large celebration of victory and peace began. 31 local schools and 1,000 students took part in a large Field Day in Deloraine, led by a band from Shilo Camp, the parade colours were carried by local servicemen, led by local war hero Peter Engbrecht of Whitewater, Manitoba.

As part of Manitoba's municipal amalgamation initiative, the Town of Deloraine amalgamated with the Rural Municipality of Winchester on January 1, 2015 to become the Municipality of Deloraine – Winchester.

== Geography ==
Deloraine is located on the western shore of Whitewater Lake a brackish lake located in the endorheic basin that drastically fluctuates its water levels based on precipitation cycles. Just south of the community lie the Turtle Mountains, a plateau that rises 90 to 120 m (300 to 390 ft) above the surrounding countryside. The Manitoba side of the plateau is protected by a provincial park, Turtle Mountain Provincial Park, which is approximately 186 km^{2} (72 sq mi) in size.

=== Climate ===
Climate data for Deloraine Climate ID: 5010760; coordinates 49°11′N 100°30′W; elevation: 500.5 m (1,642 ft); 1971-2000 normals
Month	Jan	Feb	Mar	Apr	May	Jun	Jul	Aug	Sep	Oct	Nov	Dec	Year
Record high °C (°F)	7.8 (46.0)	16.5 (61.7)	21.7 (71.1)	35.0 (95.0)	41.1 (106.0)	37.5 (99.5)	40.6 (105.1)	38.5 (101.3)	38.3 (100.9)	32.0 (89.6)	21.1 (70.0)	16.1 (61.0)	41.1 (106.0)
Mean daily maximum °C (°F)	−9.7 (14.5)	−6.7 (19.9)	0.6 (33.1)	11.2 (52.2)	19.3 (66.7)	23.5 (74.3)	26.1 (79.0)	25.4 (77.7)	18.6 (65.5)	11.5 (52.7)	0.3 (32.5)	−7.9 (17.8)	9.3 (48.7)
Daily mean °C (°F)	−15.5 (4.1)	−12.2 (10.0)	−4.7 (23.5)	4.9 (40.8)	12.6 (54.7)	17.1 (62.8)	19.5 (67.1)	18.5 (65.3)	12.2 (54.0)	5.4 (41.7)	−4.5 (23.9)	−13.2 (8.2)	3.3 (37.9)
Mean daily minimum °C (°F)	−21.3 (−6.3)	−17.6 (0.3)	−9.9 (14.2)	−1.3 (29.7)	5.8 (42.4)	10.6 (51.1)	12.8 (55.0)	11.6 (52.9)	5.7 (42.3)	−0.9 (30.4)	−9.2 (15.4)	−18.5 (−1.3)	−2.7 (27.1)
Record low °C (°F)	−43.3 (−45.9)	−46.1 (−51.0)	−39.4 (−38.9)	−31.1 (−24.0)	−10.0 (14.0)	−3.3 (26.1)	−1.1 (30.0)	−3.0 (26.6)	−7.8 (18.0)	−21.0 (−5.8)	−33.3 (−27.9)	−41.5 (−42.7)	−46.1 (−51.0)
Average precipitation mm (inches)	19.6 (0.77)	14.3 (0.56)	24.4 (0.96)	33.8 (1.33)	49.9 (1.96)	85.3 (3.36)	67.4 (2.65)	58.5 (2.30)	51.2 (2.02)	33.9 (1.33)	20.6 (0.81)	19.3 (0.76)	478.1 (18.82)
Average rainfall mm (inches)	0.4 (0.02)	0.3 (0.01)	3.7 (0.15)	22.8 (0.90)	47.8 (1.88)	85.3 (3.36)	67.4 (2.65)	58.5 (2.30)	50.7 (2.00)	24.2 (0.95)	4.1 (0.16)	0.8 (0.03)	366.0 (14.41)
Average snowfall cm (inches)	19.1 (7.5)	14.0 (5.5)	20.7 (8.1)	11.0 (4.3)	2.1 (0.8)	0.2 (0.1)	0.0 (0.0)	0.0 (0.0)	0.5 (0.2)	9.8 (3.9)	16.5 (6.5)	18.5 (7.3)	112.3 (44.2)
Average precipitation days (≥ 0.2 mm)	7.00	5.70	5.60	5.40	8.30	11.00	9.70	8.60	8.70	5.30	5.40	6.10	86.70
Average rainy days (≥ 0.2 mm)	0.13	0.17	0.74	3.50	8.00	11.00	9.70	8.60	8.50	4.00	0.95	0.09	55.30
Average snowy days (≥ 0.2 cm)	6.90	5.60	5.10	2.40	0.48	0.04	0.00	0.00	0.26	1.80	4.50	6.00	32.90
Source: Environment and Climate Change Canada

== Demographics ==
In the 2021 Census of Population conducted by Statistics Canada, Deloraine had a population of 962 living in 441 of its 490 total private dwellings, a change of −1.6% from its 2016 population of 978. With a land area of 2.52 km^{2} (0.97 sq mi), it had a population density of 381.7/km^{2} (988.7/sq mi) in 2021.

== Attractions ==
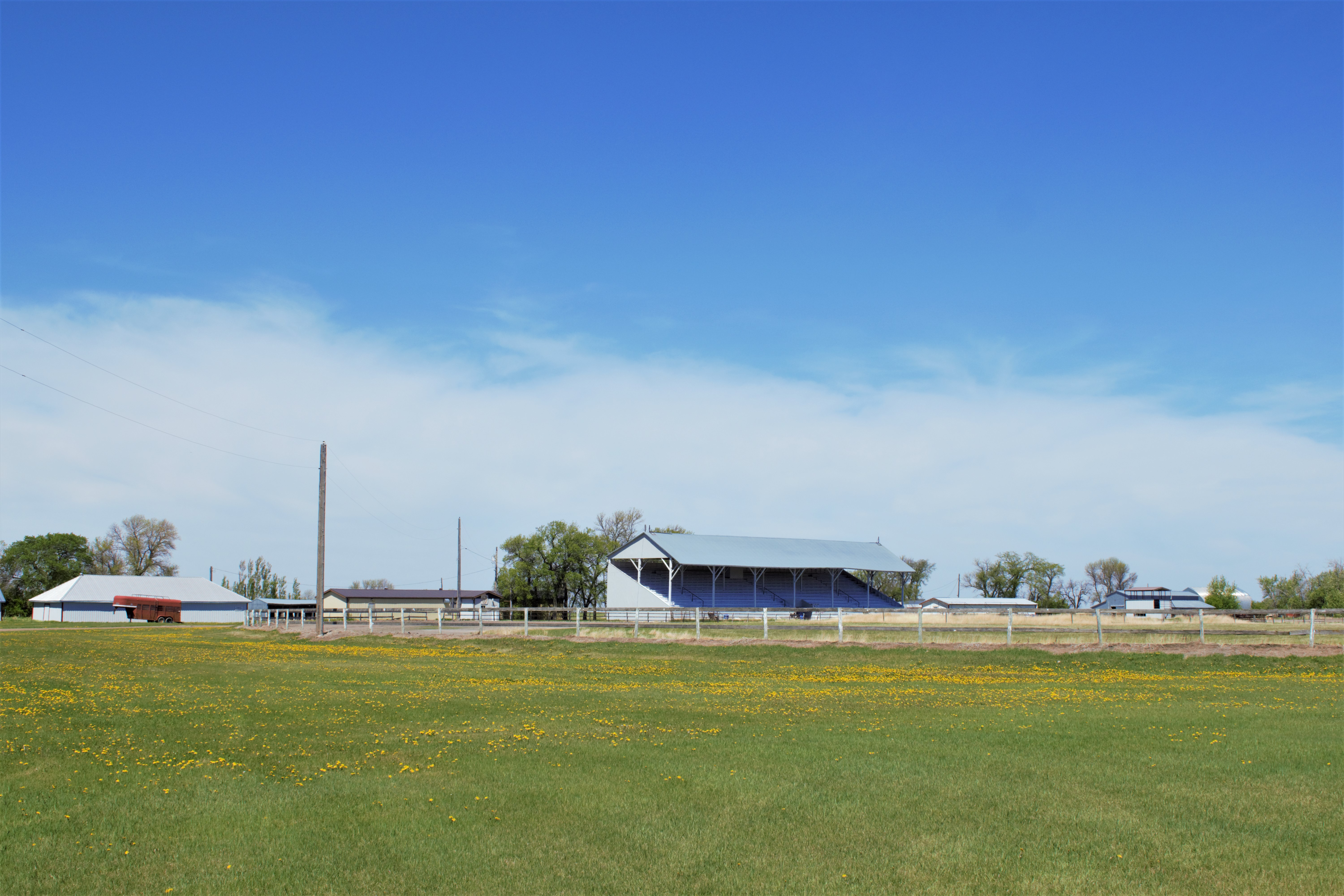
Deloraine Fair Grounds where harness racing takes place

- One of only two stone bank vaults still in existence in western Canada
- A 1/2-mile harness race track hosts racing during the summer
- Prairie Sentinels Park, home to the Flags of the World millennium project.

== Infrastructure ==
=== Water ===
Water was needed in the early days of the community and drilling took place using the power of steam engines and locomotives, including the Countess of Dufferin. Eventually water was struck at 45 metres (148 ft) though it was of poor and salty quality. After the dry years of the 1930s, a 100-acre (40 ha) water reservoir was constructed a few miles southeast of the town on the Turtlehead Creek, near the present day Deloraine Golf Course. The reservoir and the pipe connection to the town was completed in 1963 when the community had a reliable source of potable water. Sewage lagoons were constructed at the east end of the community and treated sewage then flows north and east into Whitewater Lake.

== Notable people ==
- Ashton Bell, Olympic and professional hockey player
- Ronald D. Bell, judge
- James Bissett, diplomat
- William Morton, tenor
- Marty Murray, professional hockey player
- Rick Neufeld, musician
- Peter Nygård, fashion designer and sex offender
- Colleen Robbins MLA for Spruce Woods
