= International Peace Garden =

Park on the Canada-United States border

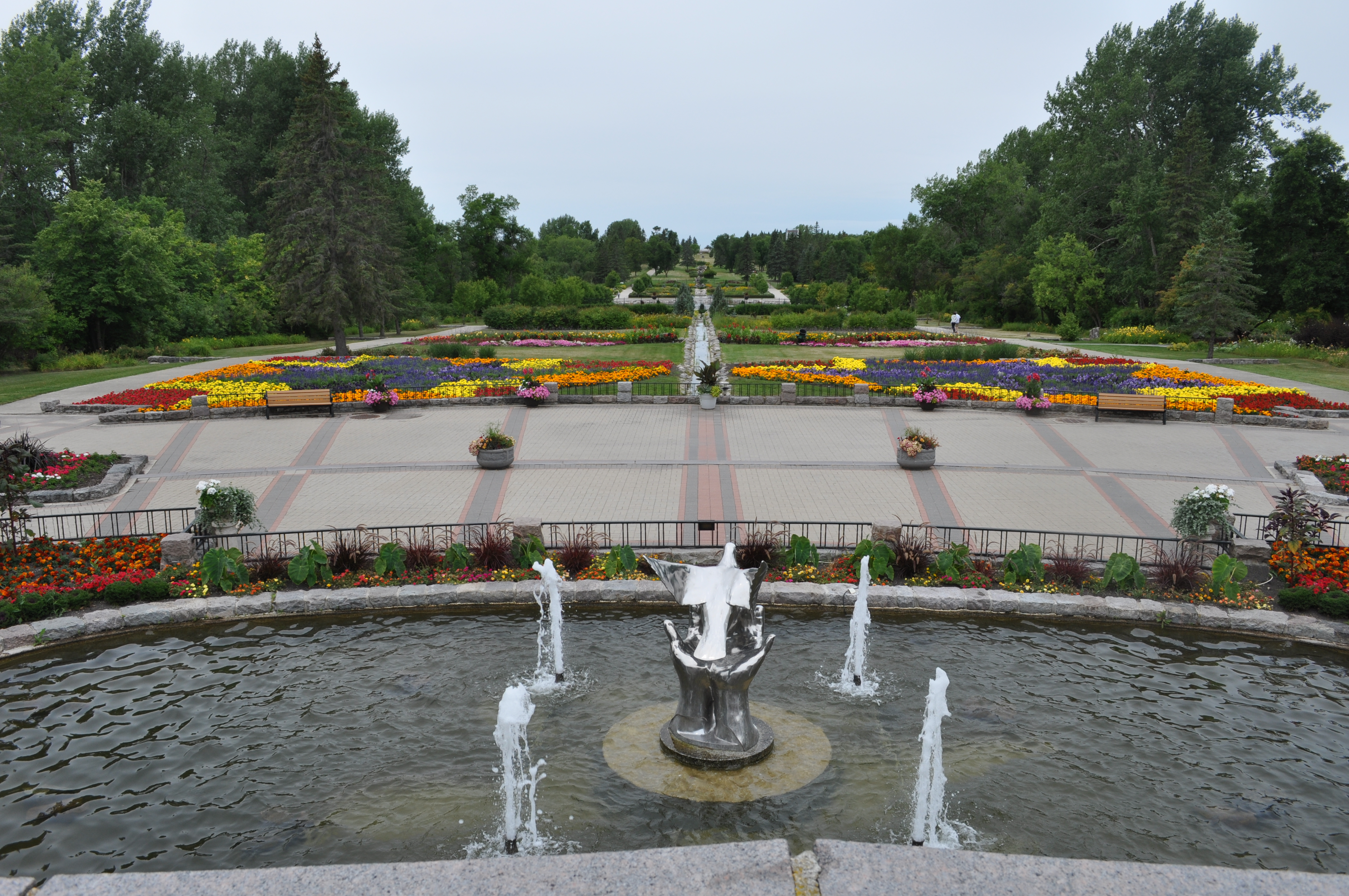
- A view of the fountain and flower gardens. The central division divides Canada (right) from the USA (left).
- Interactive map of International Peace Garden
- Coordinates: 48.999364°N 100.052641°W
- Area: 9.5 km^{2} (3.7 sq mi)
- Established: 1932
- Visitors: Over 100,000 a year
- Website: peacegarden.com

The International Peace Garden (French: Jardin international de la paix) is a 9.5-square-kilometre (3.7 sq mi) park located adjacent to the International Peace Garden Border Crossing along the Canada–United States border between the province of Manitoba and the state of North Dakota. It was established on July 14, 1932, as a symbol of the peaceful relationship between the two countries.

The slogan Peace Garden State originates from the International Peace Garden, and was added to vehicle registration plates of North Dakota in 1956, In the next year, the North Dakota Legislative Assembly made the slogan an official state nickname.

== Features ==
The park plants over 150,000 flowers each year. Main features of the garden include an 5.5-metre (18 ft) floral clock display, and fountains. A chime and twin 37-metre (121 ft) concrete towers straddled the border with a peace chapel at their base; the chapel walls were inscribed with notable quotations about peace. However, the concrete towers had been declared unsafe due to irreparable weather-related erosion and were demolished in 2017. As of 2018, a new tower was slated for construction on the spot.

The Arma Sifton bells are a chime of 14 bells cast by Gillett & Johnston bellfounders. The bells were a gift from Central United Church of Brandon, Manitoba in 1972. The tower was supplied by North Dakota Veterans and dedicated in 1976. Some building remains of the World Trade Center attacks of September 11, 2001, have been placed in part of the garden.

The Masonic Auditorium, built in the shape of a Masonic Square and Compasses, was completed in 1981 as a centennial project of Grand Lodges of Manitoba and North Dakota and features seating for 2,000 people. The Peace Garden Lodge of Freemasons holds an annual communication on the property. The officers, ritual and program are rotated each year between the Grand Lodges of Manitoba, North Dakota, Minnesota, and Saskatchewan.

The Peace Garden hosts two youth camps every summer, the International Music Camp and the Legion Athletic Camp. Additionally, it has hosted the International Hamfest, an amateur radio meet-up, every year since 1964.

Located at the garden is the North American Game Warden Museum.

The park lies near the center of the Turtle Mountain plateau, whose climate, topography, wildlife, and natural vegetation differ considerably from the surrounding prairies.

== Access ==
The park is located north of Dunseith, North Dakota, at the northern terminus of U.S. Highway 281 in northwestern Rolette County. It is also adjacent to the southeast corner of Turtle Mountain Provincial Park in the Municipality of Boissevain – Morton, south of Boissevain, Manitoba, at the southern terminus of Manitoba Provincial Highway 10. Paid admission is required.

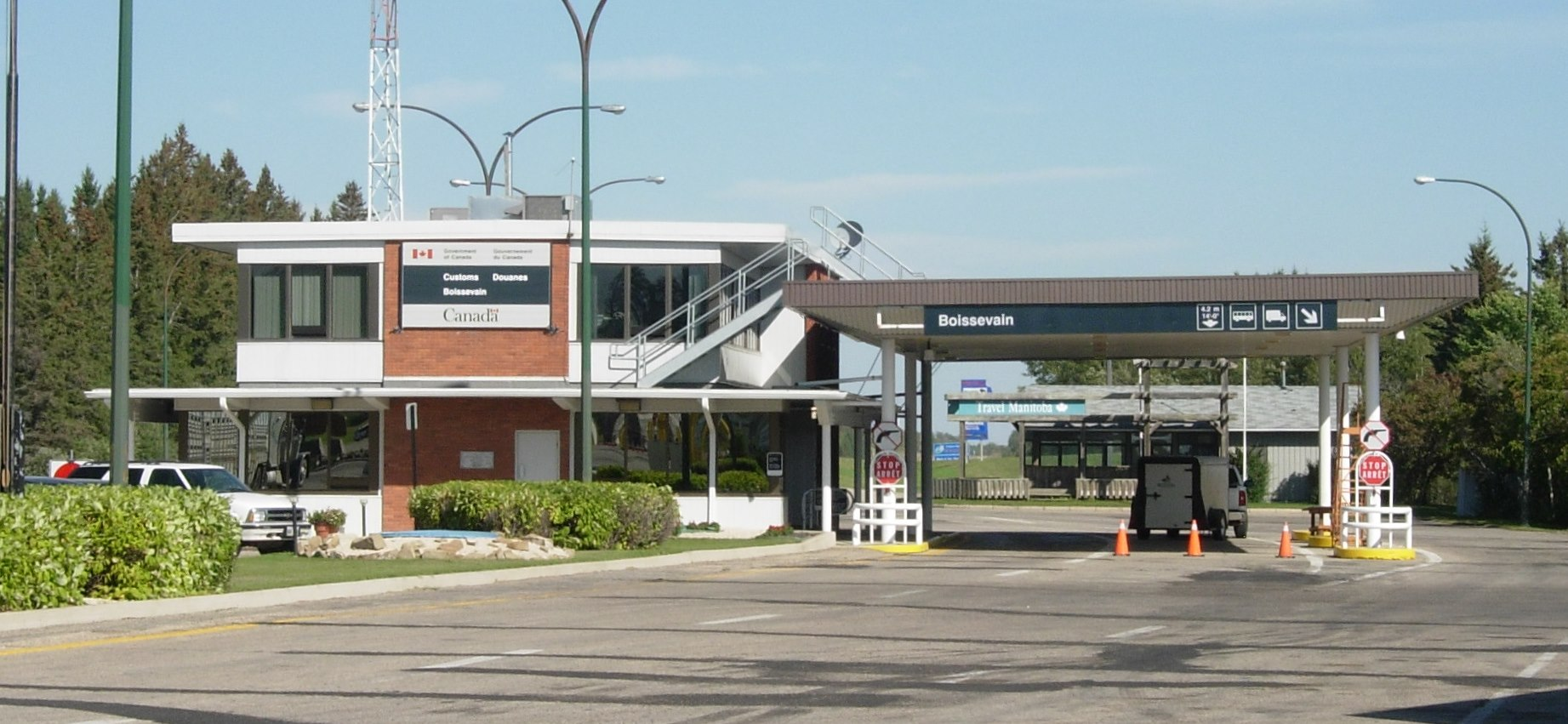
Border crossing into Canada on Manitoba Highway 10. Those exiting the park must go through border customs

Visitors from either country can enter the park via US 281 or MB 10, without passing through customs, and may move throughout the park (crossing the international boundary at will) without restriction. However, the International Peace Garden Border Crossing stations for Canada and the U.S. are located on the roads just north and south (respectively) of the access drives for the garden, requiring all visitors – including those returning to the country from which they arrived – to go through the immigration procedures of their destination country upon leaving the garden.

During the COVID-19 pandemic of 2020–21, the garden was closed in April 2020; it reopened in May the same year, but with Canadian visitors subject to two weeks quarantine on return to their own country.

International Peace Garden Airport is located to the east of the garden on the U.S. side of the border.

== Gallery ==
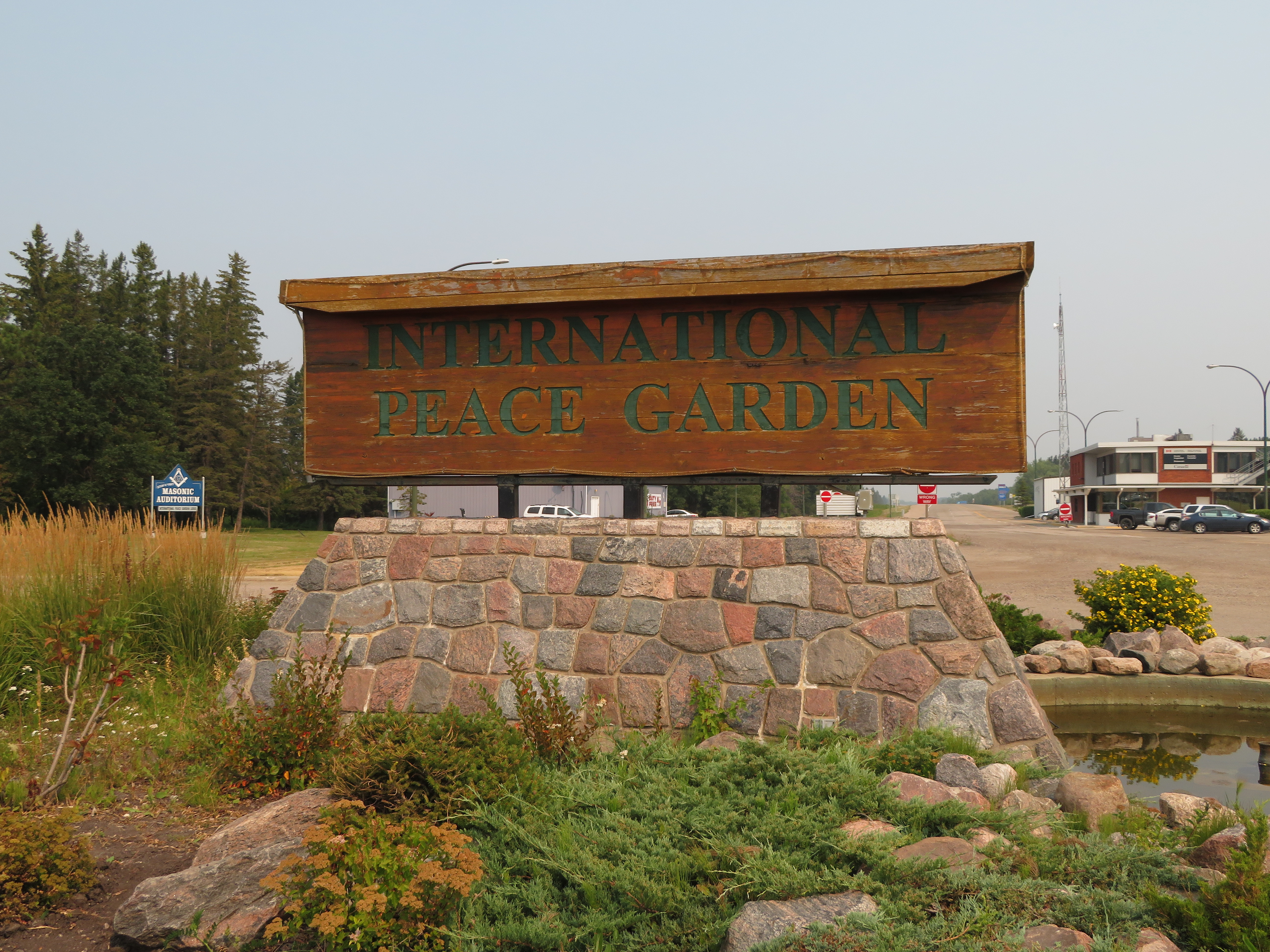
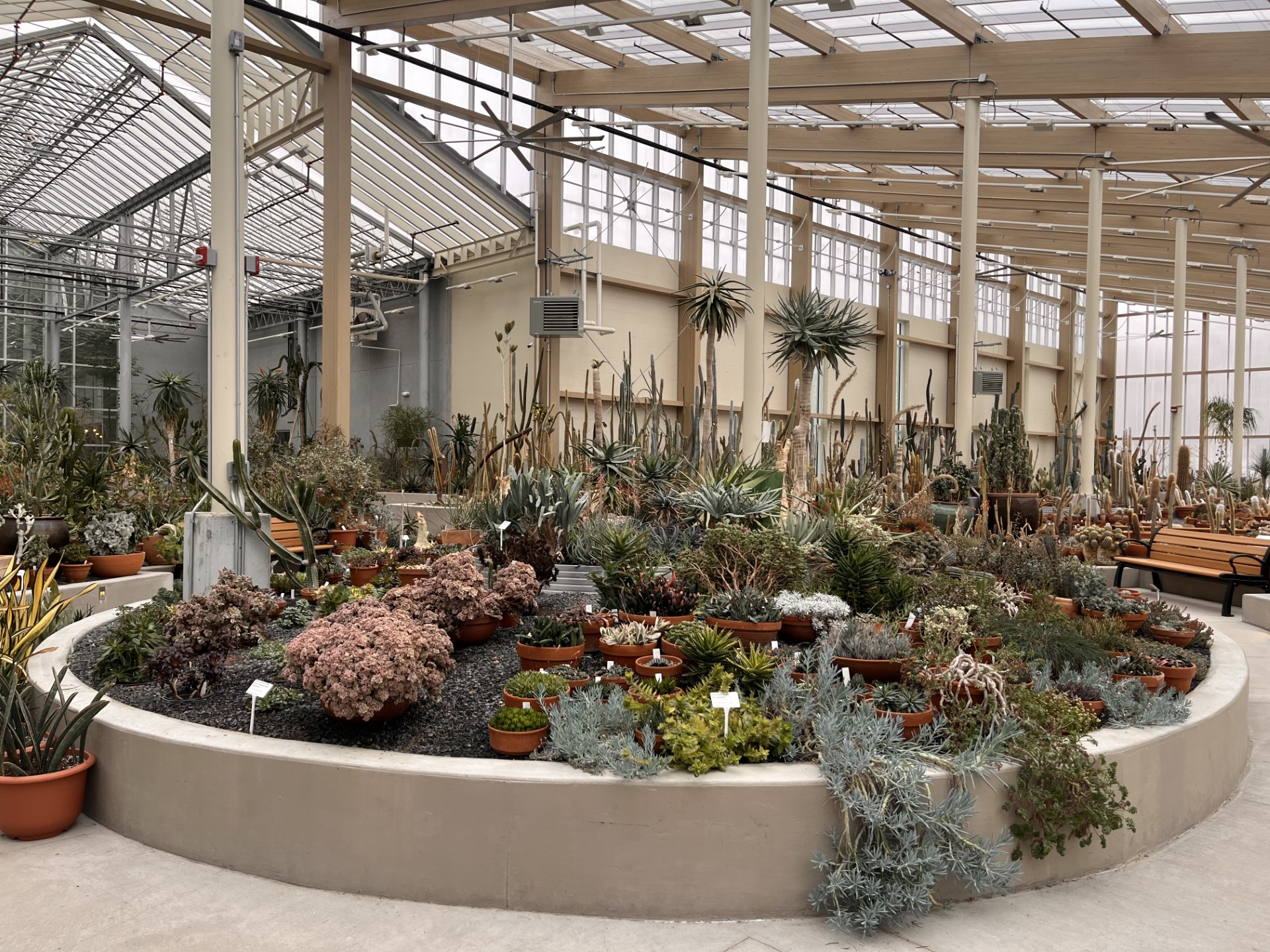
Conservatory interior
Entrance sign.

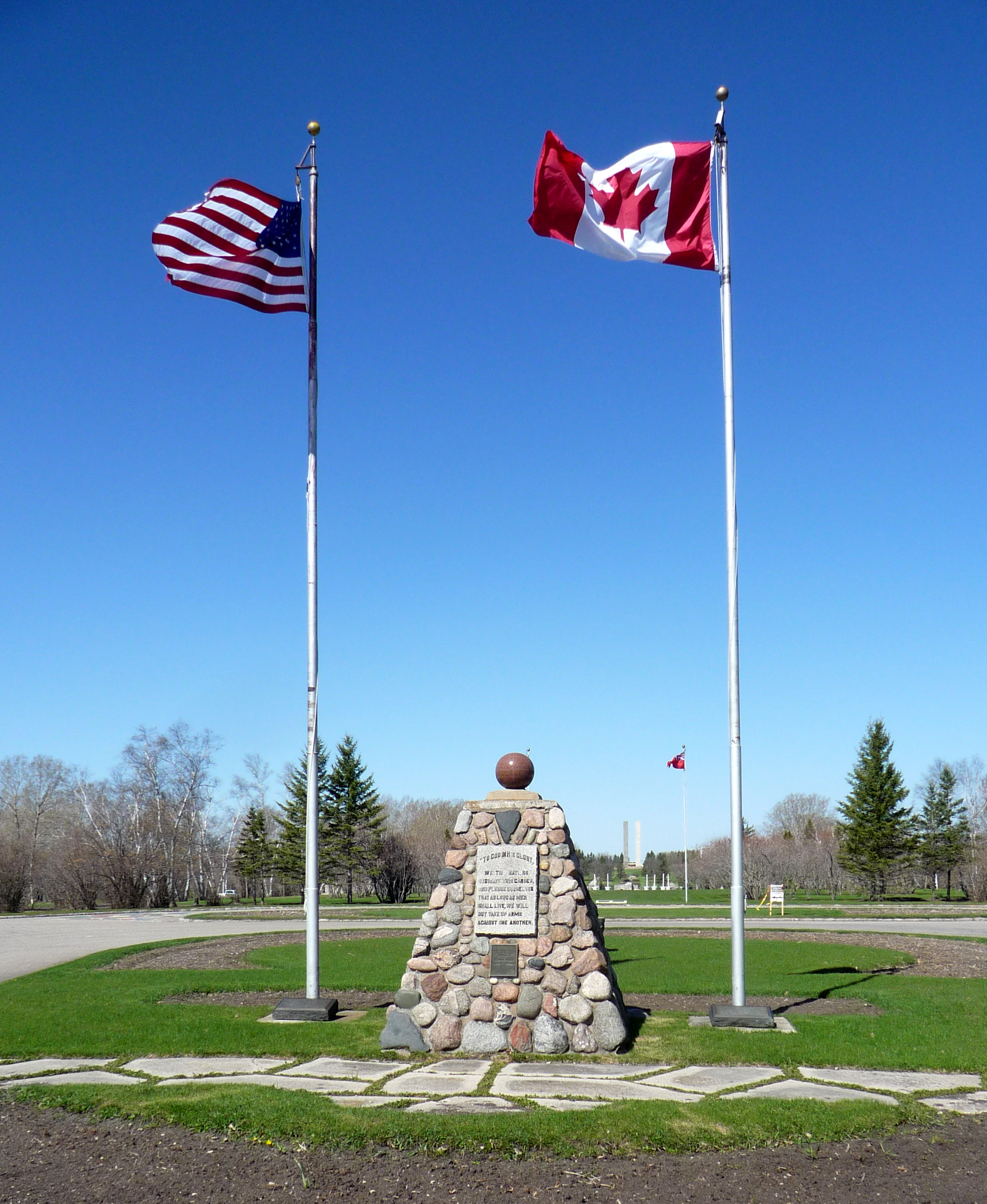
Original monument.

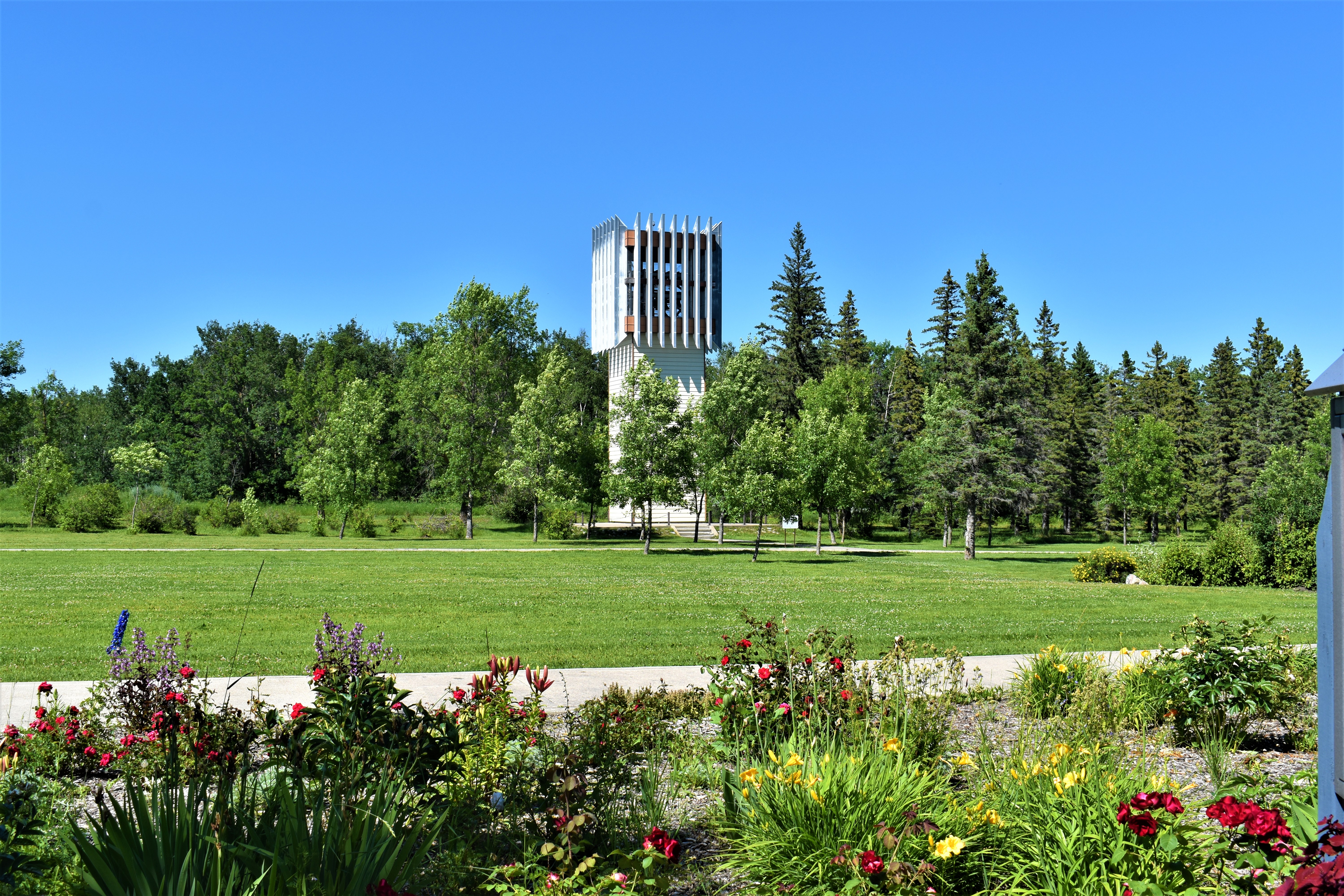
Carillon bell tower.

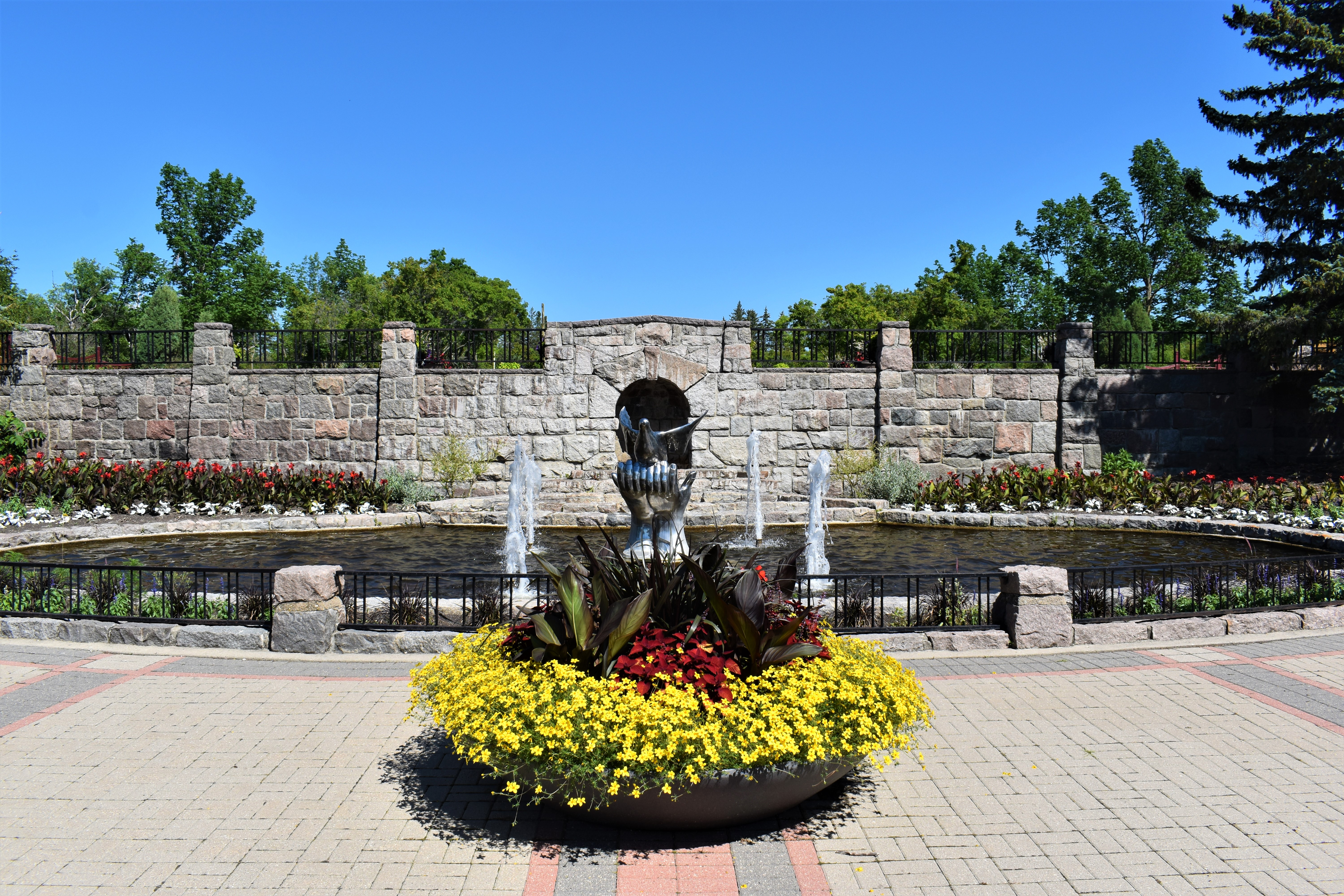
View of the fountain.

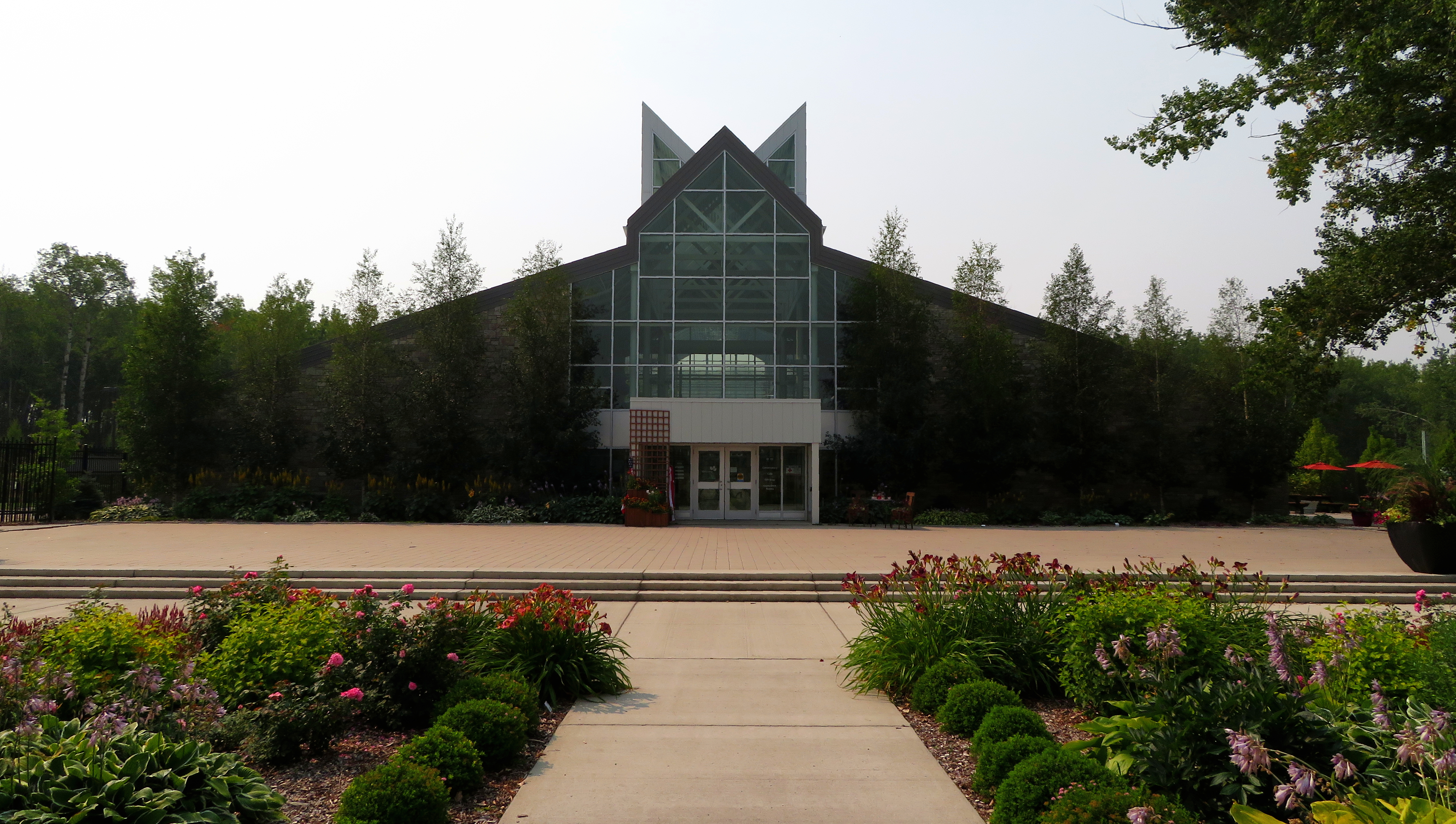
Conservatory & Interpretive Center

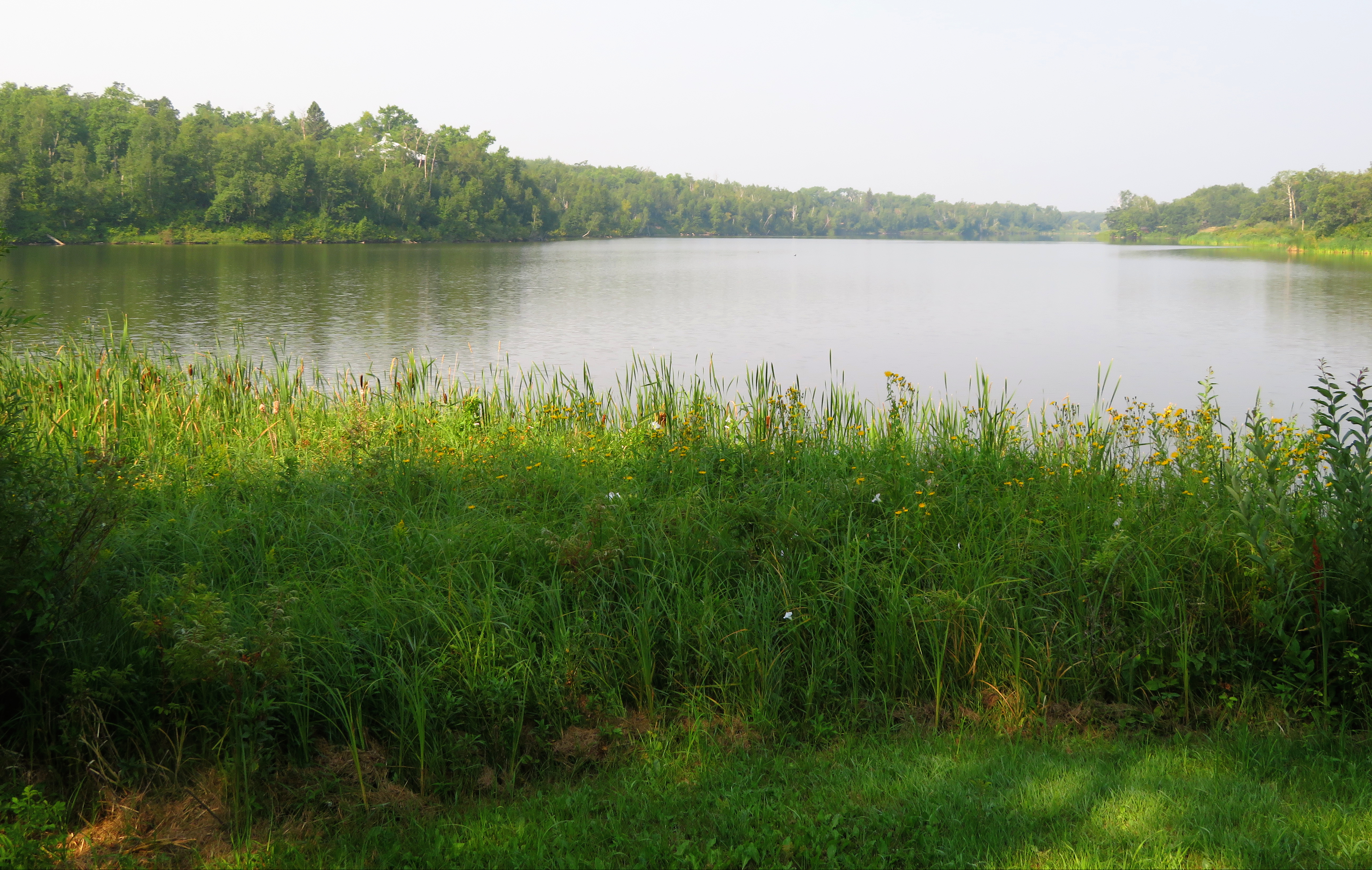
Lake Stormon along the scenic loop.

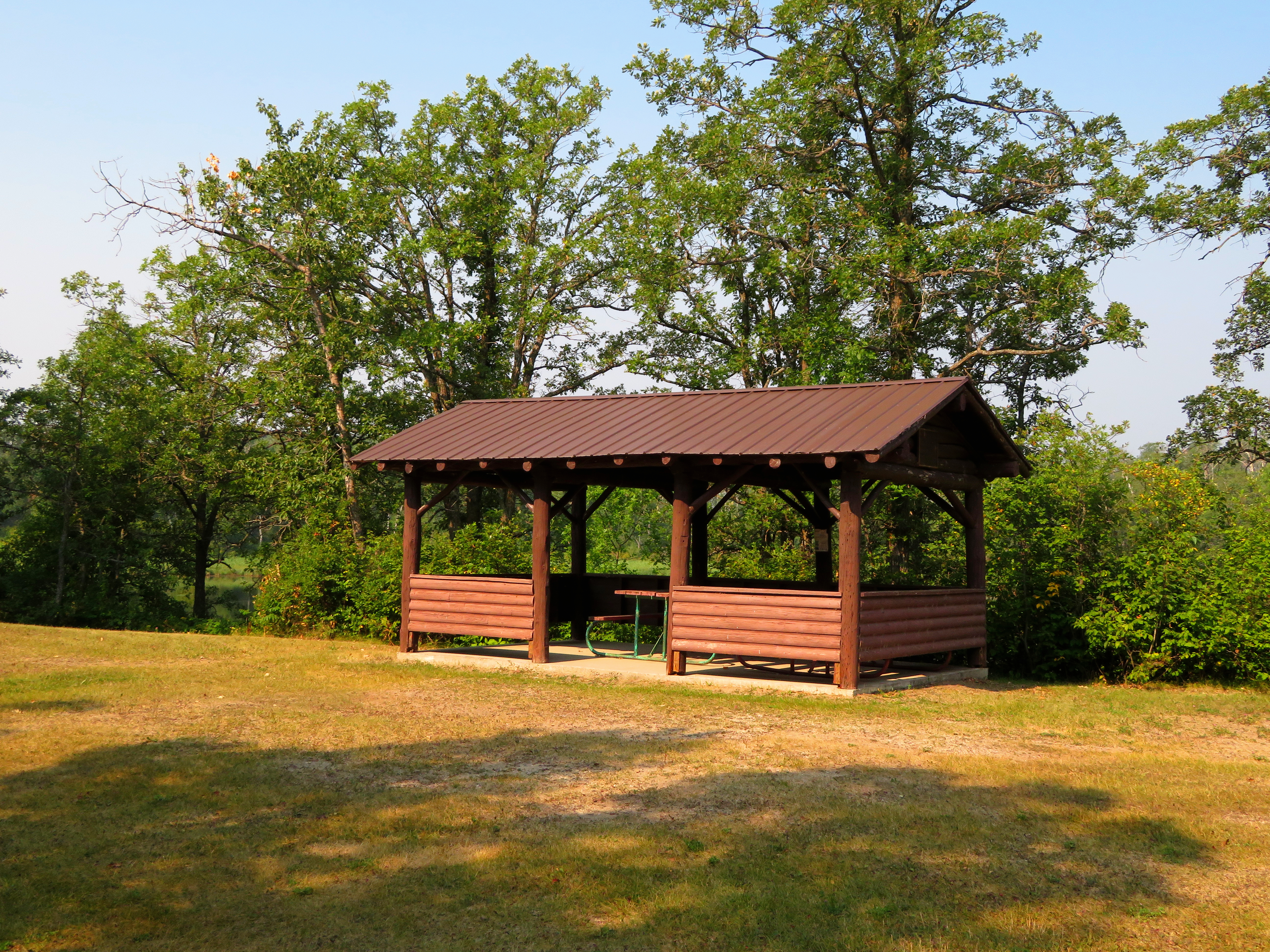
Part of the McKellar Picnic Area

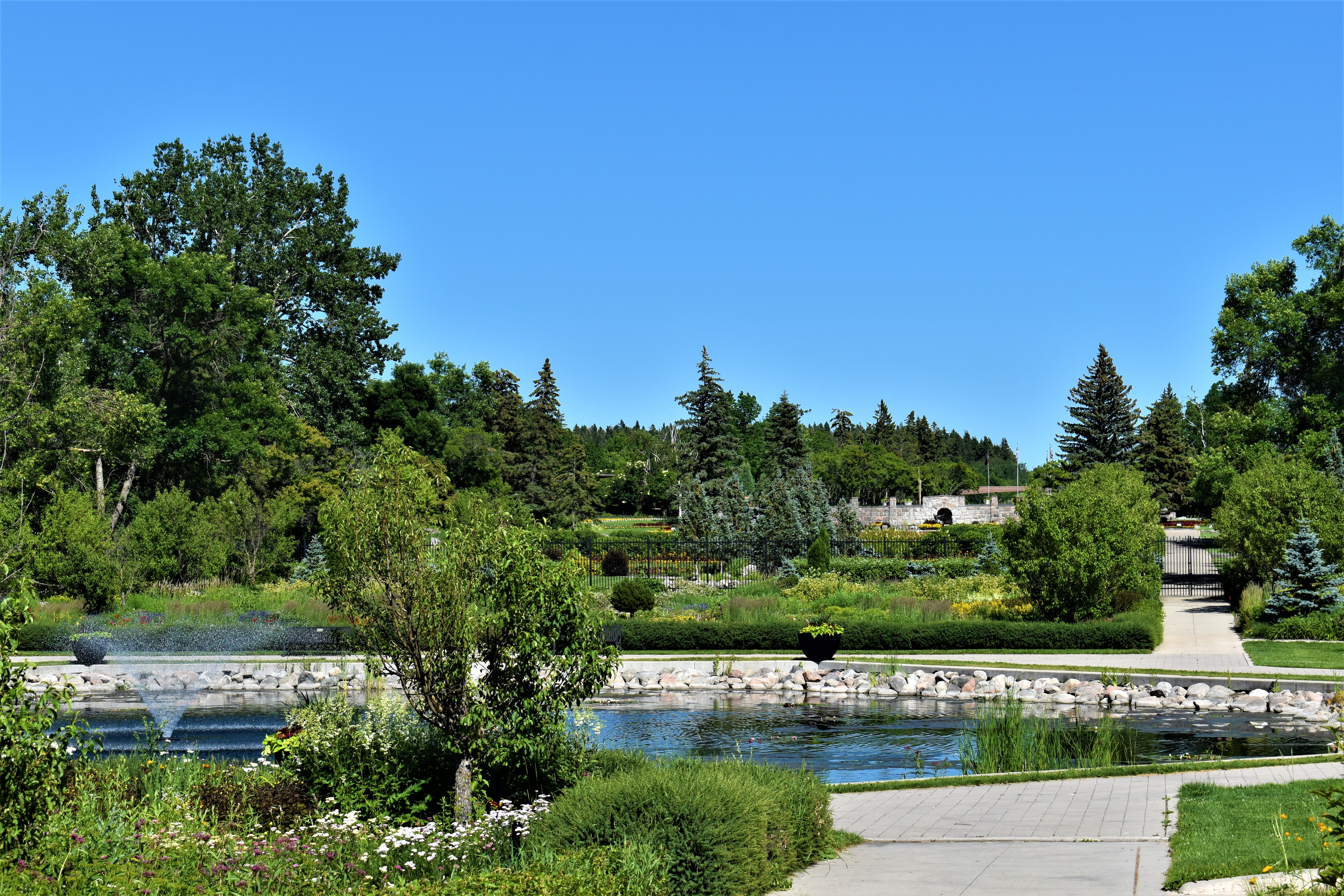
Sunken garden.

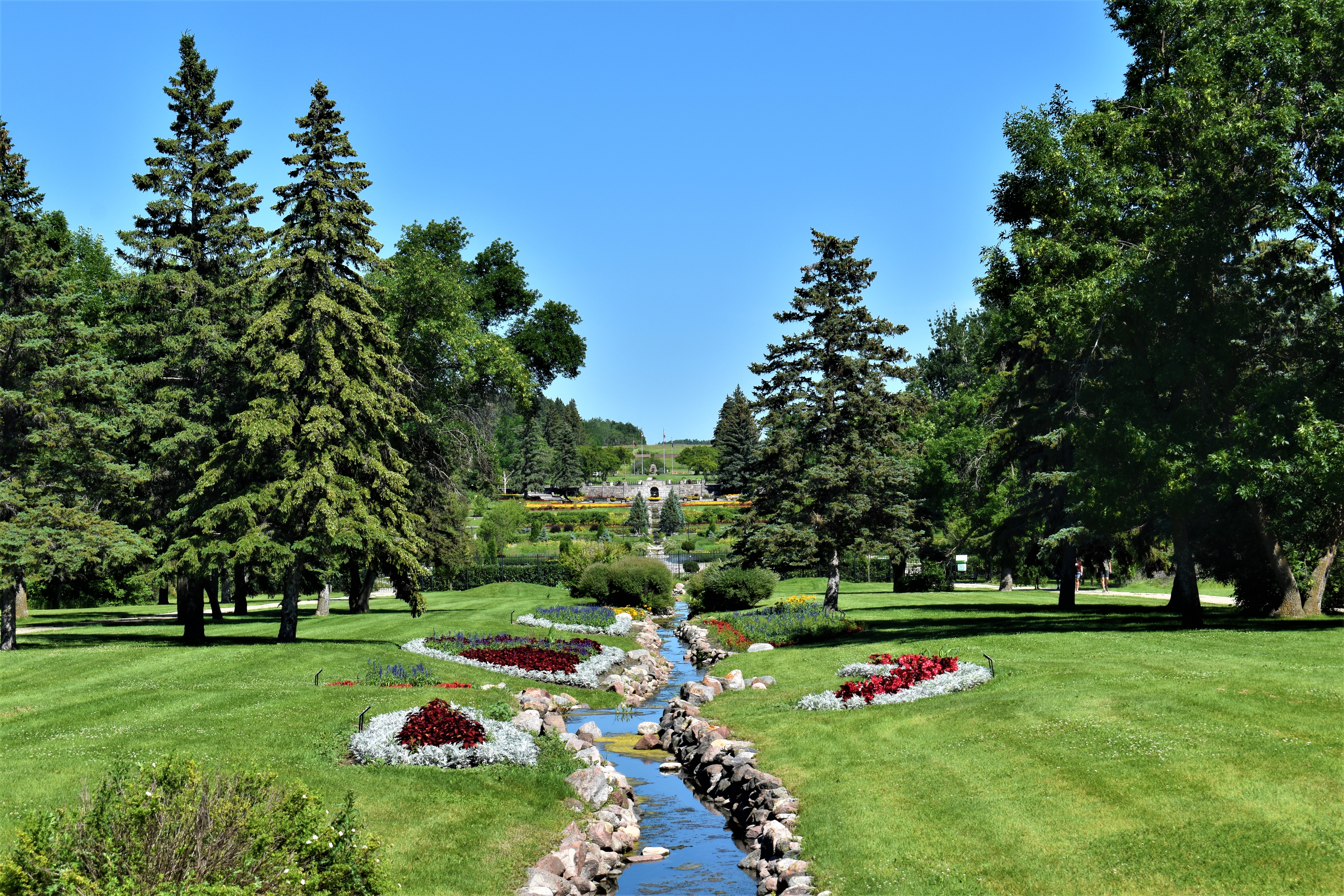
Looking east towards the fountain.

== See also ==
- Canada–United States relations
- Peace Arch Park, another park on the international border between British Columbia and Washington
