= Municipality of Deloraine-Winchester =

Rural municipality in Manitoba, Canada

Deloraine – Winchester
- Rural municipality
- Municipality of Deloraine – Winchester
- Location of Deloraine – Winchester in Manitoba
- Coordinates: 49.194°N 100.494°W
- Country: Canada
- Province: Manitoba
- Region: Westman
- Incorporated (amalgamated): January 1, 2015

Area
  - Total: 728.13 km^{2} (281.13 sq mi)

Population (2021)
  - Total: 1,478
  - Density: 2.030/km^{2} (5.257/sq mi)
- Time zone: UTC-6 (CST)
  - Summer (DST): UTC-5 (CDT)
- Website: delowin.ca

The Municipality of Deloraine – Winchester is a rural municipality (RM) in the Canadian province of Manitoba.

== History ==
The RM was incorporated on January 1, 2015 via the amalgamation of the RM of Winchester and the Town of Deloraine. It was formed as a requirement of The Municipal Amalgamations Act, which required that municipalities with a population less than 1,000 amalgamate with one or more neighbouring municipalities by 2015. The Government of Manitoba initiated these amalgamations in order for municipalities to meet the 1997 minimum population requirement of 1,000 to incorporate a municipality.

== Communities ==
- Dand
- Deloraine

== Demographics ==
In the 2021 Census of Population conducted by Statistics Canada, Deloraine-Winchester had a population of 1,478 living in 673 of its 929 total private dwellings, a change of −0.7% from its 2016 population of 1,489. With a land area of 728.13 km^{2} (281.13 sq mi), it had a population density of 2.0/km^{2} (5.3/sq mi) in 2021.

== Points of interest ==
- Turtle Mountain Provincial Park

== See also ==
- Carbury–Goodlands Border Crossing
