= Municipality of Boissevain-Morton =

Rural municipality in Manitoba, Canada

Boissevain-Morton
- Rural municipality
- Municipality of Boissevain-Morton
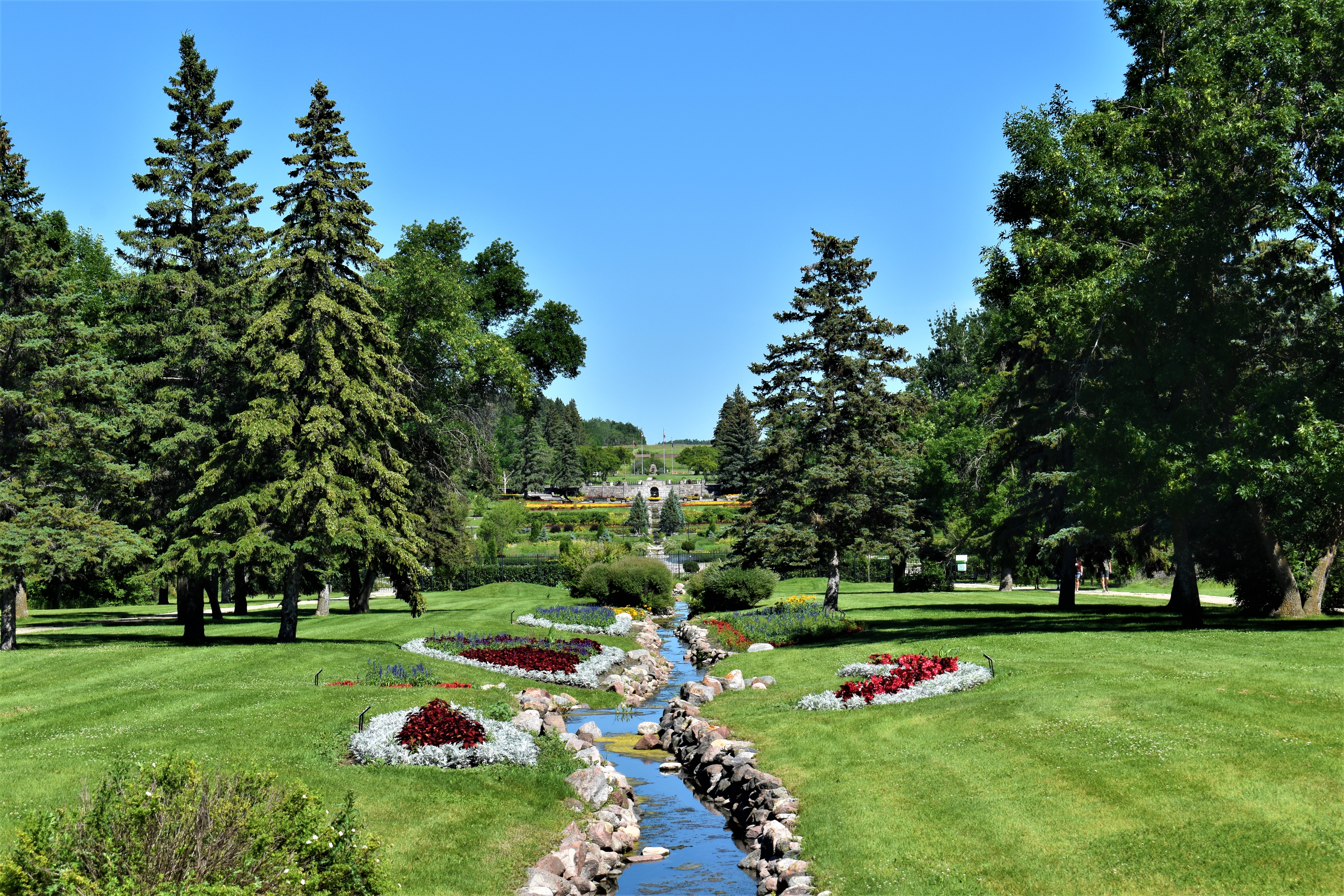
- The International Peace Garden at the Canada-United States border in the RM of Boissevain-Morton

- Location of Boissevain-Morton in Manitoba
- Coordinates: 49.230°N 100.055°W
- Country: Canada
- Province: Manitoba
- Region: Westman
- Incorporated (amalgamated): January 1, 2015

Area
  - Total: 1,102.38 km^{2} (425.63 sq mi)

Population (2021)
  - Total: 2,309
  - Density: 2.095/km^{2} (5.425/sq mi)
- Time zone: UTC-6 (CST)
  - Summer (DST): UTC-5 (CDT)

The Municipality of Boissevain-Morton is a rural municipality (RM) in the Westman Region of the Canadian province of Manitoba.

== History ==
The RM was incorporated on January 1, 2015, via the amalgamation of the RM of Morton and the Town of Boissevain. It was formed as a requirement of The Municipal Amalgamations Act, which required that municipalities with a population less than 1,000 amalgamate with one or more neighbouring municipalities by 2015. The Government of Manitoba initiated these amalgamations in order for municipalities to meet the 1997 minimum population requirement of 1,000 to incorporate a municipality.

== Demographics ==
In the 2021 Census of Population conducted by Statistics Canada, Boissevain-Morton had a population of 2,309 living in 982 of its 1,141 total private dwellings, a change of −1.9% from its 2016 population of 2,353. With a land area of 1,102.38 km^{2} (425.63 sq mi), it had a population density of 2.1/km^{2} (5.4/sq mi) in 2021.

== Attractions ==
The International Peace Garden is located on the southern boundary of the RM, the Canada–United States border opposite Rolette County, North Dakota. Much of Turtle Mountain Provincial Park lies in the southwest corner of the RM.

== See also ==
- International Peace Garden Border Crossing
