= Nanson, North Dakota =

Unincorporated community in North Dakota, United States

Coordinates: 48°34′26″N 99°46′48″W

Nanson is an unincorporated community in Rolette County, in the U.S. state of North Dakota.

== History ==
Nanson was laid out in 1905. A post office was established at Nanson in 1905, and remained in operation until it was discontinued in 1982. The community was named for Fridtjof Nansen, a Norwegian scientist and explorer. By the 1960s, the town had withered to just a handful of residents, and by the 1990s, it was completely abandoned. Today, only a few abandoned homes and outbuildings remain.
