= Rolette County, North Dakota =

County in the United States

- County
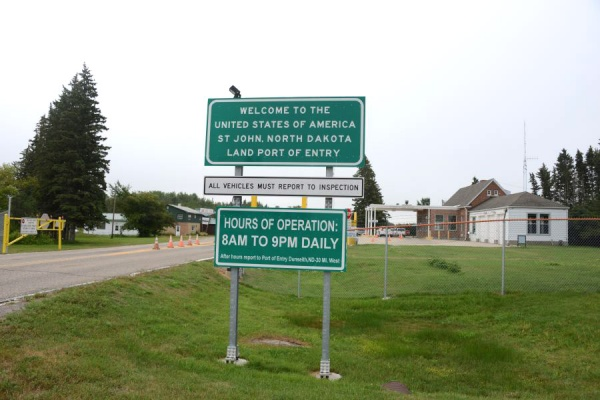
- St. John–Lena Border Crossing

- Logo

- Location within the U.S. state of North Dakota
- Coordinates: 48.768271°N 99.840463°W
- Country: United States
- State: North Dakota
- Founded: January 4, 1873 (created); October 14, 1884 (organized)
- Named for: Joseph Rolette
- Seat: Rolla
- Largest community: Belcourt

Area
  - Total: 939.499 sq mi (2,433.29 km^{2})
  - Land: 903.042 sq mi (2,338.87 km^{2})
  - Water: 36.457 sq mi (94.42 km^{2}) 3.88%

Population (2020)
  - Total: 12,187
  - Estimate (2025): 11,688 ▼
  - Density: 12.947/sq mi (4.999/km^{2})
- Time zone: UTC−6 (Central)
  - Summer (DST): UTC−5 (CDT)
- Congressional district: At-large
- Website: rolettecountynd.gov

Rolette County is a county in the U.S. state of North Dakota. As of the 2020 census, the population was 12,187, and was estimated to be 11,688 in 2025. The county seat is Rolla and the largest community is Belcourt.

== History ==
The Dakota Territory legislature created the county on January 4, 1873, with territory partitioned from Buffalo County. It was not organized at that date, and was not attached to another county for judicial or administrative purposes. It was named for Joseph Rolette Jr., a fur trader and political figure from Pembina. The county government was effected on October 14, 1884, with Dunseith as the county seat. In 1885 the county seat was assigned to Saint John, and in 1889 it was assigned to Rolla.

The county boundaries were adjusted in 1883 and in 1887. It has retained its present boundary configuration since 1887.

The International Peace Garden is located in the northwest corner of the county along the Canada–United States border with Manitoba.

== Geography ==
Native vegetation based on NRCS soils information

Rolette County lies on the northern border of North Dakota with Canada. Gimby Creek and Wakopa Creek flow into the county from Canada. The terrain consists of dry rolling hills in the south, and more verdant low hills in the north and northwest, dotted with lakes and ponds.

Part of the Turtle Mountain plateau lies in the northwestern part of the county. The terrain slopes to the south and east; its highest point is its northwest corner, at 2,195 ft (669 m) ASL.

The Turtle Mountain Indian Reservation is in the northeast section of Rolette County.

According to the United States Census Bureau, the county has a total area of 939.499 square miles (2,433.29 km^{2}), of which 903.042 square miles (2,338.87 km^{2}) is land and 36.457 square miles (94.42 km^{2}) (3.88%) is water. It is the 44th largest county in North Dakota by total area.

=== Major highways ===
- U.S. Highway 281
- North Dakota Highway 3
- North Dakota Highway 5
- North Dakota Highway 30
- North Dakota Highway 43
- North Dakota Highway 66

=== Adjacent counties and rural municipalities ===
- Municipality of Boissevain-Morton, Manitoba – northwest
- Municipality of Killarney-Turtle Mountain, Manitoba – northeast
- Towner County – east
- Pierce County – south
- Bottineau County – west

=== Protected areas ===
- Lords Lake National Wildlife Refuge (part)
- Rabb Lake National Wildlife Refuge
- School Section Lake National Wildlife Refuge
- Willow Lake National Wildlife Refuge

=== Lakes ===
- Belcourt Lake
- Bigham Lake
- Bymes Lake
- Carpenters Lake
- Coon Lake
- Gatten Lake
- Girl Lake
- Gordon Lake
- Hartley Lake (part)
- Horseshoe Lake
- Island Lake
- Lagerquist Lake
- Lake Upsilon
- Little Gurr Lake
- Long Lake
- Lords Lake (part)
- Mill Lake
- Mill Lake
- Rabb Lake
- School Section Lake
- Schutte Lake
- South Messier Lake (part)
- Ducker Lake
- Twin Lake
- Twin Lakes (part)
- Willow Lake

== Demographics ==
Historical population
Census	Pop.	Note	%±
1890	2,427		—
1900	7,995		229.4%
1910	9,558		19.5%
1920	10,061		5.3%
1930	10,760		6.9%
1940	12,583		16.9%
1950	11,102		−11.8%
1960	10,641		−4.2%
1970	11,549		8.5%
1980	12,177		5.4%
1990	12,772		4.9%
2000	13,674		7.1%
2010	13,937		1.9%
2020	12,187		−12.6%
2025 (est.)	11,688	▼	−4.1%
U.S. Decennial Census; 1790–1960 1900–1990; 1990–2000 2010–2020

As of the fourth quarter of 2024, the median home value in Rolette County was $98,539.

As of the 2023 American Community Survey, there are 3,686 estimated households in Rolette County with an average of 3.23 persons per household. The county has a median household income of $57,355. Approximately 23.5% of the county's population lives at or below the poverty line. Rolette County has an estimated 53.1% employment rate, with 16.6% of the population holding a bachelor's degree or higher and 83.9% holding a high school diploma.

The top five reported ancestries (people were allowed to report up to two ancestries, thus the figures will generally add to more than 100%) were English (93.0%), Spanish (0.9%), Indo-European (0.9%), Asian and Pacific Islander (0.6%), and Other (4.5%).

Rolette County, North Dakota – racial and ethnic composition
Note: the US Census treats Hispanic/Latino as an ethnic category. This table excludes Latinos from the racial categories and assigns them to a separate category. Hispanics/Latinos may be of any race.

Race / ethnicity (NH = non-Hispanic)	Pop. 1980	Pop. 1990	Pop. 2000	Pop. 2010	Pop. 2020
White alone (NH)	5,091 (41.81%)	4,204 (32.92%)	3,416 (24.98%)	2,802 (20.10%)	2,298 (18.86%)
Black or African American alone (NH)	8 (0.07%)	28 (0.22%)	10 (0.07%)	21 (0.15%)	13 (0.11%)
Native American or Alaska Native alone (NH)	7,020 (57.65%)	8,457 (66.22%)	9,907 (72.45%)	10,677 (76.61%)	9,210 (75.57%)
Asian alone (NH)	18 (0.15%)	13 (0.10%)	10 (0.07%)	16 (0.11%)	23 (0.19%)
Pacific Islander alone (NH)	—	—	0 (0.00%)	1 (0.01%)	8 (0.07%)
Other race alone (NH)	3 (0.02%)	5 (0.04%)	4 (0.03%)	1 (0.01%)	8 (0.07%)
Mixed race or multiracial (NH)	—	—	217 (1.59%)	286 (2.05%)	490 (4.02%)
Hispanic or Latino (any race)	37 (0.30%)	65 (0.51%)	110 (0.80%)	133 (0.95%)	137 (1.12%)
Total	12,177 (100.00%)	12,772 (100.00%)	13,674 (100.00%)	13,937 (100.00%)	12,187 (100.00%)

=== 2024 estimate ===
As of the 2024 estimate, there were 11,692 people and 3,686 households residing in the county. There were 4,596 housing units at an average density of 5.09 per square mile (2.0/km^{2}). The racial makeup of the county was 18.5% White (18.2% NH White), 0.5% African American, 77.4% Native American, 0.3% Asian, 0.0% Pacific Islander, _% from some other races and 3.2% from two or more races. Hispanic or Latino people of any race were 1.3% of the population.

=== 2020 census ===
As of the 2020 census, there were 12,187 people, 4,114 households, and 2,857 families residing in the county. The population density was 13.5 inhabitants per square mile (5.2/km^{2}). There were 4,581 housing units at an average density of 5.07 per square mile (2.0/km^{2}).

Of the residents, 33.0% were under the age of 18 and 14.2% were 65 years of age or older; the median age was 33.4 years. For every 100 females there were 99.7 males, and for every 100 females age 18 and over there were 94.6 males.

There were 4,114 households in the county, of which 40.9% had children under the age of 18 living with them and 31.2% had a female householder with no spouse or partner present. About 24.5% of all households were made up of individuals and 10.0% had someone living alone who was 65 years of age or older.

There were 4,581 housing units, of which 10.2% were vacant. Among occupied housing units, 68.4% were owner-occupied and 31.6% were renter-occupied. The homeowner vacancy rate was 1.3% and the rental vacancy rate was 10.2%.

The racial makeup of the county was 19.0% White, 0.1% African American, 76.1% American Indian and Alaska Native, 0.2% Asian, 0.1% from some other race, and 4.3% from two or more races, and Hispanic or Latino residents of any race comprised 1.1% of the population.

The most reported ancestries were:

- Turtle Mountain Band of Chippewa Indians (56.3%)
- Chippewa (15.1%)
- German (7.1%)
- Norwegian (5.6%)
- French (3.2%)
- English (2.7%)
- Irish (2.4%)
- Finnish (1%)
- Mexican (1%)

=== 2010 census ===
As of the 2010 census, there were 13,937 people, 4,783 households, and 3,413 families residing in the county. The population density was 15.4 inhabitants per square mile (5.9/km^{2}). There were 5,372 housing units at an average density of 5.95 per square mile (2.3/km^{2}). The racial makeup of the county was 20.27% White, 0.15% African American, 77.23% Native American, 0.11% Asian, 0.01% Pacific Islander, 0.11% from some other races and 2.12% from two or more races. Hispanic or Latino people of any race were 0.95% of the population.

In terms of ancestry, 48.5% were French Canadian, 7.0% were German, 6.8% were Norwegian, and 0.3% were American.

There were 4,783 households, 44.9% had children under the age of 18 living with them, 39.1% were married couples living together, 23.2% had a female householder with no husband present, 28.6% were non-families, and 25.0% of all households were made up of individuals. The average household size was 2.89 and the average family size was 3.39. The median age was 30.5 years.

The median income for a household in the county was $28,265 and the median income for a family was $35,523. Males had a median income of $35,595 versus $27,459 for females. The per capita income for the county was $13,632. About 25.9% of families and 31.8% of the population were below the poverty line, including 41.5% of those under age 18 and 24.8% of those age 65 or over.

== Communities ==
=== Cities ===
- Dunseith
- Mylo
- Rolla (county seat)
- Rolette
- St. John

=== Census-designated places ===
- Belcourt
- East Dunseith
- Green Acres
- Shell Valley

=== Unincorporated communities ===
- Ackworth
- Agate
- Alcide
- Boydton
- Carpenter
- Fonda
- Gronna
- Kelvin
- McCumber
- Nanson
- San Haven
- Thorne

=== Townships ===
- Kohlmeier
- Shell Valley
- South Valley

=== Unorganized territories ===
- East Rolette
- North Rolette
- South Rolette
- Turtle Valley

== Politics ==
Due to its Native American majority population, Rolette County voters are historically Democratic, and it is one of the most consistently Democratic counties in North Dakota. Since 1928 the only Republican to carry the county was Dwight D. Eisenhower in 1952. It was the only county in the state to support George McGovern in 1972 and is additionally the only North Dakota county to have supported Jimmy Carter in 1980. In each of the five presidential elections from 1996 to 2012, the Democratic candidate received over 60% of the vote, with Barack Obama winning 75.1% in 2008 and 74.0% in 2012. In 2016, Democratic candidate Hillary Clinton received 55.9% of the county's votes, one of the two North Dakota counties that she carried.

United States presidential election results for Rolette County, North Dakota
Year	Republican		Democratic		Third party(ies)	
Year	No.	%	No.	%	No.	%
1900	566	60.41%	355	37.89%	16	1.71%
1904	912	66.38%	366	26.64%	96	6.99%
1908	811	55.32%	529	36.08%	126	8.59%
1912	339	26.74%	396	31.23%	533	42.03%
1916	600	40.00%	762	50.80%	138	9.20%
1920	2,139	75.05%	535	18.77%	176	6.18%
1924	869	35.92%	137	5.66%	1,413	58.41%
1928	1,327	37.50%	2,181	61.63%	31	0.88%
1932	706	19.59%	2,855	79.22%	43	1.19%
1936	857	19.34%	3,186	71.89%	389	8.78%
1940	1,555	35.41%	2,820	64.21%	17	0.39%
1944	1,070	37.78%	1,745	61.62%	17	0.60%
1948	1,179	41.09%	1,565	54.55%	125	4.36%
1952	2,188	65.02%	1,160	34.47%	17	0.51%
1956	1,444	45.44%	1,728	54.37%	6	0.19%
1960	1,277	35.33%	2,335	64.59%	3	0.08%
1964	892	25.80%	2,566	74.20%	0	0.00%
1968	1,211	37.23%	1,870	57.49%	172	5.29%
1972	1,713	48.13%	1,803	50.66%	43	1.21%
1976	1,094	29.62%	2,531	68.54%	68	1.84%
1980	1,599	44.84%	1,660	46.55%	307	8.61%
1984	1,479	39.43%	2,179	58.09%	93	2.48%
1988	1,126	31.23%	2,426	67.28%	54	1.50%
1992	895	24.82%	2,002	55.52%	709	19.66%
1996	823	22.85%	2,299	63.84%	479	13.30%
2000	1,416	32.20%	2,681	60.96%	301	6.84%
2004	1,392	34.42%	2,564	63.40%	88	2.18%
2008	1,045	23.05%	3,403	75.06%	86	1.90%
2012	1,092	23.99%	3,353	73.66%	107	2.35%
2016	1,217	32.41%	2,099	55.90%	439	11.69%
2020	1,257	33.04%	2,482	65.25%	65	1.71%
2024	1,427	35.02%	2,567	62.99%	81	1.99%

== Education ==
School districts include:

- Belcourt Public School District 7 (as the Turtle Mountain Community School, in cooperation with the Bureau of Indian Education (BIE))
- Bottineau Public School District 1
- Dunseith Public School District 1
- Mount Pleasant Public School District 4
- North Star School District 10
- Rolette Public School District 29
- Rugby Public School District 5
- St. John Public School District 3

Former districts:

- Wolford Public School District 1 - Closed in 2019

== See also ==
- National Register of Historic Places listings in Rolette County, North Dakota
