= Turtle Mountain Provincial Park =

Provincial park in Manitoba, Canada

- IUCN category II (national park)
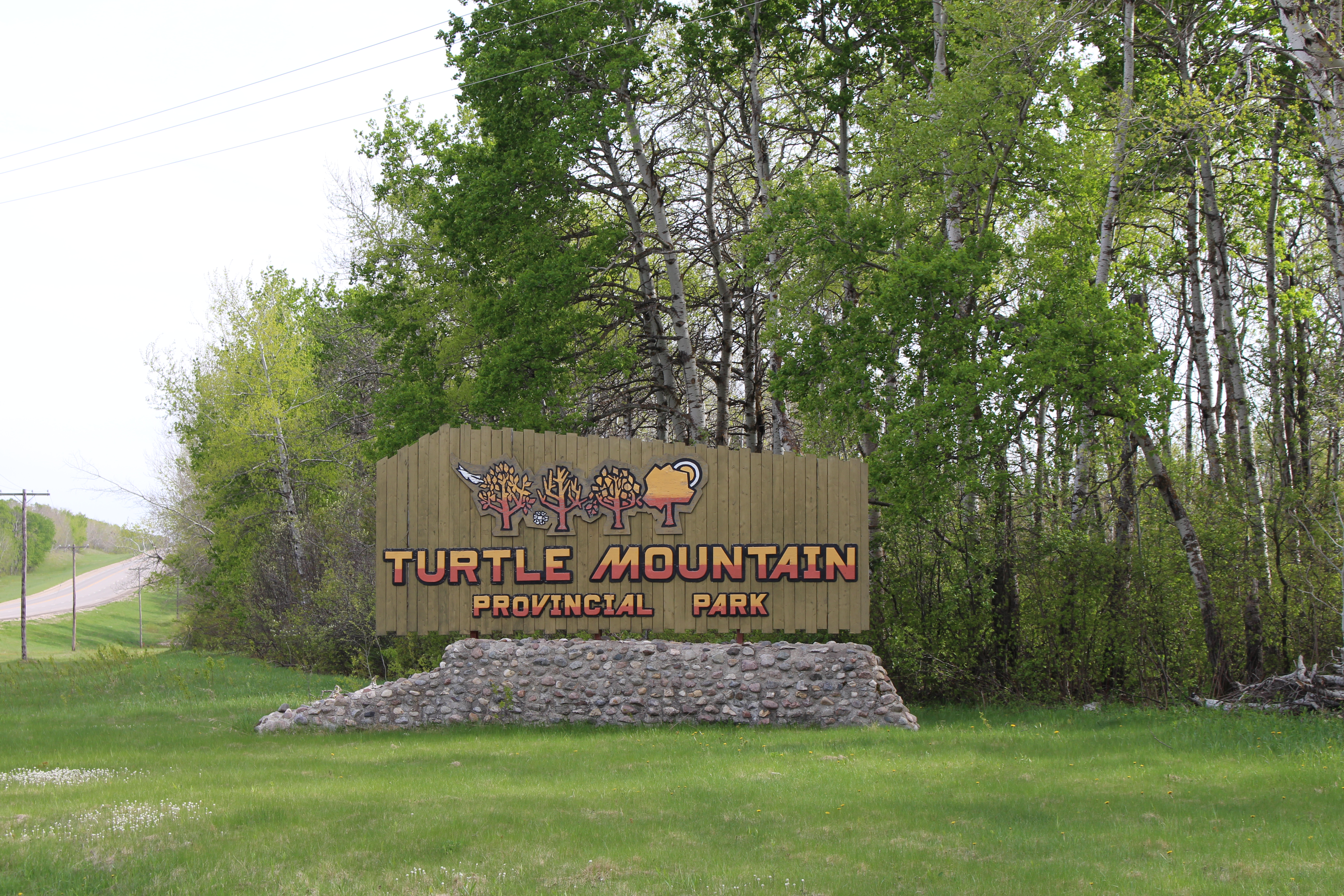

- Location within Manitoba
- Interactive map of Turtle Mountain Provincial Park
- Location: Manitoba, Canada
- Nearest town: Boissevain, Manitoba
- Coordinates: 49°3′0″N 100°15′1″W
- Area: 186 km^{2} (72 sq mi)
- Established: 1961
- Governing body: Government of Manitoba
- Website: www.gov.mb.ca/sd/parks/park-maps-and-locations/western/turtle.html

Turtle Mountain Provincial Park is a provincial park located in the southwestern portion of the Canadian province of Manitoba. Within it are the Adam Lake and Max Lake campgrounds. The park is known for its bike trails, fishing, back country cabins and canoe routes. The park is very popular with families and outdoor enthusiasts.

The park is named after the numerous painted turtles found in the area. The turtles can be seen throughout the warmer months sun bathing near permanent ponds or lakes in the park. In late spring and early summer the females can be seen laying eggs in sandy soil throughout the park. The turtles live in the shallow lakes in the park.

Turtle Mountain Provincial Park was designated a provincial park by the Government of Manitoba in 1961. The park is 186 square kilometres (72 sq mi) in size. The park is considered to be a Class II protected area under the IUCN protected area management categories.

It is adjacent to the international border between Canada and the United States. Its southeast corner is adjacent to the International Peace Garden which is located in both Manitoba and the U.S. state of North Dakota. To the east is the William Lake Provincial Park, home to the William Lake Campground, and the Prairie Farm Rehabilitation Administration. To the north is the town of Boissevain, with the city of Brandon farther north. Most of the park is situated in the southwesternmost section of the Municipality of Boissevain – Morton, while the rest of it lies in the southeast corner of the Municipality of Deloraine – Winchester.

The park is nearly coterminous with the slightly larger Turtle Mountain Provincial Forest. The only difference is a small section of the forest lying east of Manitoba Highway 10 at the southeast corner of the forest (near the International Peace Garden), which is outside the park's territory.

Manitoba Escarpment

== History ==
=== Early history ===
Following the last ice age, Turtle Mountain Provincial Park became the first inhabited location in Manitoba. It is also the biggest remaining natural deciduous forest in southwestern Manitoba. Once coniferous forests grew and animals were attracted to the area, nomadic hunters soon followed. Stone tools have been found, confirming their presence. Based on the exhumed artifacts, archaeologists have concluded these people were hunter gatherers, not farmers.

Turtle Mountain can be found on the Palliser map of 1865.

In 1875 George Mercer Dawson became the first geologist to travel through Turtle Mountain Provincial Park. Dawson noted the glacial deposits throughout the park.

=== Indigenous peoples ===
Métis from the Red River Colony travelled to Turtle Mountain Provincial Park for annual hunting trips between 1810 and 1870. After the buffalo hunt ended many Métis built homesteads within the park. The location was known by the Métis as Tête de Tortue, seeing a resemblance to the buckler of a turtle, its head being represented by the conical mound standing out from one end (CPCGN files). Two notable cultural sites are the Dunseith Trail and Oskar Lake archeological site. The Dunseith Trail was the first trail across Turtle Mountain, and the archeological site was used by Cree hunters over 400 years ago.

== Use and activities ==
Formerly, the park was predominantly used for agricultural purposes due to the presence of hardwoods. The area is no longer dependent on Turtle Mountain for timber, so it is now mainly used for recreation and ranching. There is a trail system used for biking, hiking, and horseback riding. There are also various beaches, playgrounds, and picnic areas for recreational use. The eutrophication of many of the water bodies can make it difficult for recreation in the summer. The most common type of farming is grain farming.

== Geography ==
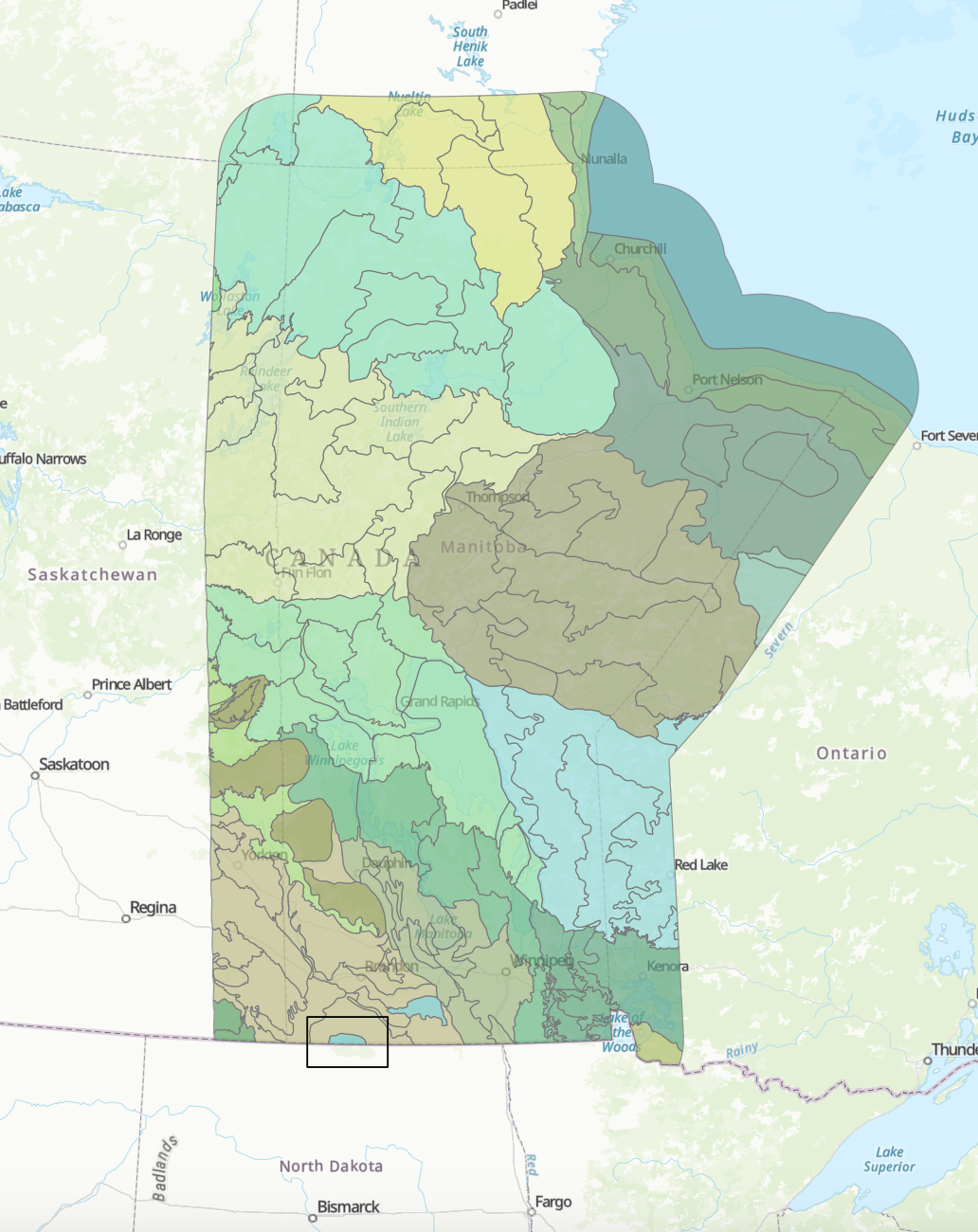
Ecoregions of Manitoba

Turtle Mountain Provincial Park is situated on the Turtle Mountain (plateau), one of a number of significant geographic features located along the Manitoba Escarpment, the Canadian portion of the Pembina Escarpment. It is located in the Southwest Manitoba Uplands Ecoregion, within the Canadian Prairies. The park is situated at an elevation of 245 metres. This region is covered by glacial till and fluvioglacial deposits, which remain from the pleistocene ice age. A study of dinoflagellates confirmed the paleocene age of the Turtle Mountain formation. Once deglaciation finished 14,000 years ago the irregular melting pattern left the area covered in hummocky terrain. The soils are mainly grey and black chernozems. There are grey luvisols at higher elevations. The bedrock in the park is composed of sandstone, shale, lignite coal. There are over 200 lakes and wetlands in this region. Many of the shorelines are covered in thick vegetation due to the littoral zone cattails. This park is home to the largest oak trees in Manitoba, which are the lone survivors of a fire that occurred in the early 20th century. Many of the water bodies are less than 15 feet deep, which often results in a winter decline in fish populations due to lack of oxygen.

Turtle Mountain Provincial Park, Manitoba

Climate chart (precipitation, max. and min. temperature)
| J | F | M | A | M | J | J | A | S | O | N | D |
| 23 −9 −19 | 21 −5 −16 | 23 0 −9 | 30 10 −2 | 66 18 5 | 84 22 10 | 75 25 13 | 67 25 12 | 48 18 6 | 43 11 0 | 28 −1 −9 | 23 −8 −17 |
- █ Average max. and min. temperatures in °C
- █ Precipitation totals in mm
- Source: Environment Canada
Imperial conversion
| J | F | M | A | M | J | J | A | S | O | N | D |
| 0.9 16 −3 | 0.8 22 4 | 0.9 32 15 | 1.2 50 29 | 2.6 64 42 | 3.3 71 51 | 2.9 76 55 | 2.6 76 54 | 1.9 64 43 | 1.7 51 32 | 1.1 31 16 | 0.9 18 1 |
- █ Average max. and min. temperatures in °F
- █ Precipitation totals in inches

== Flora and fauna ==
Turtle Mountain Provincial Park is located within the temperate deciduous forest, and is predominantly covered by Populus tremuloides (trembling aspen). Other vegetation species include balsam poplar and bur oak. Turtle mountain is home to many wildlife species such as moose, white-tailed deer, beaver, raccoons, and various types of birds. The lakes contain various fish species such as rainbow and brown trout.

== See also ==
- List of protected areas of Manitoba
- Painted turtle
- Turtle Mountain (plateau)
