= List of communities in Manitoba by population =

Manitoba has 81 communities, excluding rural municipalities, that have a population of 1,000 or greater according to the 2021 Census of Canada conducted by Statistics Canada. These communities include cities, towns, villages, reserves inhabited by First Nations, a local government district that is urban in nature, designated places, and population centres. A population centre, according to Statistics Canada, is an area with a population of at least 1,000 and a density of 400 or more people per square kilometre.

== List ==
Rank	Name	Type	Population (2021)	Population (2016)	Percentage change
1	Winnipeg	City	749,607	705,244	6.3
2	Brandon	City	51,313	48,883	5.0
3	Steinbach	City	17,806	16,022	11.1
4	Winkler	City	13,745	12,660	8.6
5	Portage la Prairie	City	13,270	13,304	-0.3
6	Thompson	City	13,035	13,678	-4.7
7	Selkirk	City	10,504	10,278	2.2
8	Morden	City	9,929	8,668	14.5
9	Dauphin	City	8,368	8,369	0.0
10	Niverville	Town	5,947	4,610	29.0
11	Neepawa	Town	5,685	4,609	23.3
12	The Pas	Town	5,639	5,369	5.0
13	Norway House 17	Reserve	5,390	4,807	12.1
14	Stonewall	Town	5,046	4,809	4.9
15	Oakbank	Population centre	5,041	4,604	9.5
16	Flin Flon	City (Manitoba portion)	4,940	4,991	-1.0
17	Altona	Town	4,267	4,212	1.3
18	Swan River	Town	4,049	4,014	0.9
19	Lorette	Designated place	3,512	3,208	9.5
20	St. Theresa Point	Reserve	3,417	3,262	4.8
21	Beausejour	Town	3,307	3,219	2.7
22	Mitchell	Population centre	3,136	2,523	24.3
23	Virden	Town	3,118	3,322	-6.1
24	Carman	Town	3,114	3,164	-1.6
25	Garden Hill First Nation	Reserve	3,054	2,603	17.3
26	Peguis 1B	Reserve	3,053	2,704	12.9
27	Ste. Anne	Town	2,891	2,114	36.8
28	Minnedosa	Town	2,741	2,449	11.9
29	La Salle	Designated place	2,687	2,069	29.9
30	Sandy Bay 5	Reserve	2,598	2,515	3.3
31	Killarney	Population centre	2,499	2,315	7.9
32	Nelson House 170	Reserve	2,397	2,500	-4.1
33	Gimli	Population centre	2,345	2,251	4.2
34	Split Lake 171	Reserve	2,232	2,044	9.2
35	Opaskwayak Cree Nation 21E	Reserve	2,210	2,473	-10.6
36	Stony Mountain	Population centre	2,160	1,800	20.0
37	Fort Alexander 3	Reserve	2,127	1,929	10.3
38	Wasagamack	Reserve	2,088	1,403	48.8
39	Cross Lake 19A	Reserve	2,045	1,922	6.4
40	Morris	Town	1,975	1,885	4.8
41	Souris	Designated place	1,970	1,974	-0.2
42	Oxford House 24	Reserve	1,955	1,955	0.0
43	Cross Lake 19	Reserve	1,865	1,607	16.1
44	Pukatawagan 198	Reserve	1,844	1,844	0.0
45	Carberry	Town	1,818	1,738	4.6
46	Grunthal	Designated place	1,782	1,680	6.1
47	Russell	Designated place	1,740	1,599	8.8
48	Blumenort	Designated place	1,738	1,675	3.8
49	La Broquerie	Designated place	1,715	1,401	22.4
50	Roblin	Designated place	1,709	1,697	0.7
51	Ebb and Flow 52	Reserve	1,608	1,341	19.9
52	Ile-des-Chenes	Designated place	1,606	1,546	3.9
53	St. Adolphe	Population centre	1,595	1,367	16.7
54	Boissevain	Designated place	1,577	1,656	-4.8
55	Pinawa	Local government district	1,558	1,504	3.6
56	God's Lake 23	Reserve	1,520	1,211	25.5
57	Fisher River 44	Reserve	1,449	1,473	-1.6
58	Oak Bluff	Population centre	1,442	1,051	37.2
59	Winnipeg Beach	Town	1,439	1,145	25.7
60	Waywayseecappo First Nation	Reserve	1,409	1,365	3.2
61	CFB Shilo	Population centre	1,362	1,419	-4.0
62	Long Plain (Part) 6	Reserve	1,335	1,232	8.4
63	Landmark	Designated place	1,326	1,292	2.6
64	St. Malo	Designated place	1,323	1,227	7.8
65	St-Pierre-Jolys	Village	1,305	1,170	11.5
66	Arborg	Town	1,279	1,232	3.8
67	Chemawawin 2	Reserve	1,264	1,252	1.0
68	Powerview-Pine Falls	Town	1,239	1,316	-5.9
69	Teulon	Town	1,196	1,201	-0.4
70	Berens River 13	Reserve	1,161	1,039	11.7
71	Fairford 50	Reserve	1,144	1,169	-2.1
72	Snow Lake	Town	1,088	899	21.0
73	Lac du Bonnet	Town	1,064	1,089	-2.3
74	Sioux Valley Dakota Nation	Reserve	1,057	1,028	2.8
75	Melita	Town	1,041	1,042	-0.1
76	Plum Coulee	Designated place	1,040	904	15.0
77	Shamattawa 1	Reserve	1,019	1,019	0.0
78	Warren	Designated place	1,015	818	24.1
79	Gillam	Town	1,007	1,201	-16.2
80=	St. Andrews	Population centre	1,001	1,026	-2.4
80=	Tyndall (Tyndall-Garson)	Designated place	1,001	935	7.1

== See also ==
- List of census agglomerations in Manitoba
- List of communities in Manitoba
- List of municipalities in Manitoba
- List of population centres in Manitoba
- Manitoba Geography
