= Finlay McNaughton Young =

Canadian politician

The Honourable Finlay McNaughton Young
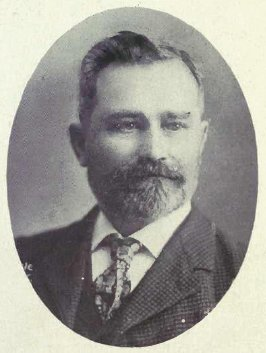

Canadian Senator from Manitoba
- In office January 30, 1900 – February 15, 1916
- Appointed by: Wilfrid Laurier

10th Speaker of the Legislative Assembly of Manitoba
- In office 14 February 1895 – December 1899
- Preceded by: Samuel Jackson
- Succeeded by: William Hespeler

Member of the Legislative Assembly of Manitoba for Turtle Mountain
- In office January 23, 1883 – July 11, 1888
- Preceded by: J. P. Alexander
- Succeeded by: John Hettle

Member of the Legislative Assembly of Manitoba for Killarney
- In office July 11, 1888 – December 7, 1899
- Preceded by: Constituency established
- Succeeded by: George Lawrence

Personal details
- Born: 2 April 1852 St. Chrysostome, Canada East
- Died: 15 February 1916 (aged 63) Killarney, Manitoba, Canada
- Party: Liberal (provincial); Liberal (federal)

Finlay McNaughton Young (2 April 1852 – 15 February 1916) was a Canadian politician.

== Background ==
Born in St. Chrysostome, Canada East, the son of Duncan Young, he was educated at St. Chrysostome and Montreal. In 1879, he moved to Manitoba. A farmer, he was first elected to the Legislative Assembly of Manitoba for the electoral division of Turtle Mountain in 1883 and re-elected at all the subsequent elections up to 1899. In 1899, he was defeated. He was Speaker of the Legislative Assembly of Manitoba from 1895 to 1899.

A Liberal, he was appointed to the Senate of Canada on 30 January 1900 on the recommendation of Sir Wilfrid Laurier. He represented the Senate division of Killarney, Manitoba, until his death.
