= Turtle Mountain (electoral district) =

Provincial electoral district in Manitoba, Canada

Coordinates: 49.439°N 99.360°W

Manitoba electoral district

Provincial electoral district
- Legislature: Legislative Assembly of Manitoba
MLA
Doyle Piwniuk
Progressive Conservative
- District created: 1881
- First contested: 1881
- Last contested: 2023

Demographics
- Population (2016): 23,165
- Electors (2019): 16,206
- Area (km²): 13,120
- Pop. density (per km²): 1.8

Turtle Mountain is a provincial electoral district of Manitoba, Canada. It was created with the westward expansion of the province's boundaries in 1881, eliminated by redistribution in 1968, and re-established in 1979, formally returned to the electoral map with the provincial election of 1981, was dissolved for the 2011 election and returned once again for the 2019 Manitoba general election.

Turtle Mountain is located in the southwestern region of the province. It is bounded to the north by Ste. Rose, to the west by Minnedosa and Arthur-Virden, to the east by Pembina, Carman and Portage la Prairie, and south to the American state of North Dakota.

The riding is primarily rural. Communities in the riding included Killarney, Carberry, Glenboro, Pilot Mound and MacGregor.

The riding's population in 1996 was 18,569. In 1999, the average family income was $43,265, and the unemployment rate was 3.50%. Agriculture accounted for 37% of all industry in the riding, followed by health and social service work at 9%. Thirteen per cent of the riding's residents were German.

Turtle Mountain has been represented by the Progressive Conservative Party for most of its history, and is considered safe for that party. It was in Tory hands for all but six years after 1922 in its first incarnation, and has been held by the Tories at all times in its third incarnation. The MLA prior to the 2019 Manitoba general election was Cliff Cullen, who was elected in a 2004 by-election.

Following the 2008 electoral redistribution, the riding was dissolved into the new ridings of Agassiz, Midland, and Spruce Woods. This change took effect for the 2011 election. Cullen transferred to Spruce Woods.

Following the 2018 redistribution, Turtle Mountain will be re-created out of Arthur-Virden, Spruce Woods and Midland and will first be contested in the 2019 Manitoba general election. The riding will contain the municipalities of Two Borders, Melita, Grassland, Brenda-Waskada, Deloraine-Winchester, Boissevain-Morton (previously in Arthur-Virden), Prairie Lakes, Killarney - Turtle Mountain, Argyle, Cartwright-Roblin (previously in Spruce Woods) and Lorne, Swan Lake 7, Louise and Pembina (previously in Midland). As of the 2016 Census, 8,294 (36%) people were in the Arthur-Virden portion of the riding, 7,215 (31%) were in the Spruce Woods portion and 7,653 (33%) were in the Midland portion, for a total population of 23,612.

The riding is named for Turtle Mountain Provincial Park.

== Members of the Legislative Assembly ==
Name	Party	Took office	Left office
J.P. Alexander	Cons	1881	1883
Finlay Young	Lib	1883	1888
John Hettle	Lib	1888	1897
James Johnson	Independent Conservative	1897	1903
	Cons	1903	1915
George William McDonald	Lib	1915	1922
Richard Willis	Cons	1922	1929
Alexander Welch	Cons/PC	1929	1945
Errick Willis	PC	1945	1959
Edward Dow	Lib-Prog	1959	1961
	Lib	1961	1962
Peter J. McDonald	PC	1962	1966
Edward Dow	Lib	1966	1969
Riding abolished
Brian Ransom	PC	1981	1986
Denis Rocan	PC	1986	1990
Bob Rose	PC	1990	1995
Merv Tweed	PC	1995	2004
Cliff Cullen	PC	2004	2011
Riding abolished
Doyle Piwniuk	PC	2019	

== Electoral results ==
=== 1881 by-election ===
Manitoba provincial by-election, 26 October 1881
Party	Candidate	Votes	%
Unknown	James Peterkin Alexander	102	52.31
Unknown	J. C. Waugh	93	47.69
Total valid votes		195	–
Rejected		N/A	–
Eligible voters / Turnout		N/A	–
Source(s) Source: Manitoba. Chief Electoral Officer (1999). Statement of Votes for the 37th Provincial General Election, September 21, 1999 (PDF) (Report). Winnipeg: Elections Manitoba.

=== 1883 ===
1883 Manitoba general election
Party	Candidate	Votes	%	±%
Liberal	Finlay McNaughton Young	232	61.54	–
Conservative	James Peterkin Alexander	145	38.46	–
Total valid votes		377	–	–
Rejected		N/A	–	
Eligible voters / Turnout		N/A	–	–
Source(s) Source: Manitoba. Chief Electoral Officer (1999). Statement of Votes for the 37th Provincial General Election, September 21, 1999 (PDF) (Report). Winnipeg: Elections Manitoba.

=== 1886 ===
1886 Manitoba general election
Party	Candidate	Votes	%	±%
Liberal	Finlay McNaughton Young	503	57.09	-4.44
Conservative	George Morton	378	42.91	4.44
Total valid votes		881	–	–
Rejected		N/A	–	
Eligible voters / Turnout		1,446	60.93	–
Source(s) Source: Manitoba. Chief Electoral Officer (1999). Statement of Votes for the 37th Provincial General Election, September 21, 1999 (PDF) (Report). Winnipeg: Elections Manitoba.

=== 1888 ===
1888 Manitoba general election
Party	Candidate	Votes	%	±%
Liberal	John Hettle	302	56.45	-0.65
Conservative	Frederick Laurence Schaffner	233	43.55	0.65
Total valid votes		535	–	–
Rejected		N/A	–	
Eligible voters / Turnout		N/A	–	–
Source(s) Source: Manitoba. Chief Electoral Officer (1999). Statement of Votes for the 37th Provincial General Election, September 21, 1999 (PDF) (Report). Winnipeg: Elections Manitoba.

=== 1892 ===
1892 Manitoba general election
Party	Candidate	Votes	%	±%
Liberal	John Hettle	468	53.42	-3.02
Conservative	Frederick Laurence Schaffner	408	46.58	3.02
Total valid votes		876	–	–
Rejected		N/A	–	
Eligible voters / Turnout		1,035	84.64	–
Source(s) Source: Manitoba. Chief Electoral Officer (1999). Statement of Votes for the 37th Provincial General Election, September 21, 1999 (PDF) (Report). Winnipeg: Elections Manitoba.

=== 1896 ===
1896 Manitoba general election
Party	Candidate	Votes	%	±%
Liberal	John Hettle	475	51.24	-2.18
Conservative	William Miller	452	48.76	2.18
Total valid votes		927	–	–
Rejected		N/A	–	
Eligible voters / Turnout		1,239	74.82	-9.82
Source(s) Source: Manitoba. Chief Electoral Officer (1999). Statement of Votes for the 37th Provincial General Election, September 21, 1999 (PDF) (Report). Winnipeg: Elections Manitoba.

=== 1897 by-election ===
Manitoba provincial by-election, 27 November 1897
Party	Candidate	Votes	%	±%
Opposition	James Johnson	516	58.50	–
Government	Thomas Nichol	366	41.50	–
Total valid votes		882	–	–
Rejected		N/A	–	
Eligible voters / Turnout		N/A	–	–
Source(s) Source: Manitoba. Chief Electoral Officer (1999). Statement of Votes for the 37th Provincial General Election, September 21, 1999 (PDF) (Report). Winnipeg: Elections Manitoba.

=== 1899 ===
1899 Manitoba general election
Party	Candidate	Votes	%	±%
Conservative	James Johnson	753	57.26	–
Liberal	James Sinclair Reekie	562	42.74	–
Total valid votes		1,315	–	–
Rejected		N/A	–	
Eligible voters / Turnout		1,598	82.29	–
Source(s) Source: Manitoba. Chief Electoral Officer (1999). Statement of Votes for the 37th Provincial General Election, September 21, 1999 (PDF) (Report). Winnipeg: Elections Manitoba.

=== 1903 ===
1903 Manitoba general election
Party	Candidate	Votes	%	±%
Conservative	James Johnson	741	54.57	-2.70
Liberal	J. S. McEwen	475	34.98	-7.76
Independent	J. F. Hunter	142	10.46	–
Total valid votes		1,358	–	–
Rejected		N/A	–	
Eligible voters / Turnout		1,465	92.70	10.41
Source(s) Source: Manitoba. Chief Electoral Officer (1999). Statement of Votes for the 37th Provincial General Election, September 21, 1999 (PDF) (Report). Winnipeg: Elections Manitoba.

=== 1907 ===
1907 Manitoba general election
Party	Candidate	Votes	%	±%
Conservative	James Johnson	649	58.42	3.85
Liberal	John Morrow	462	41.58	6.61
Total valid votes		1,111	–	–
Rejected		N/A	–	
Eligible voters / Turnout		1,424	78.02	-14.68
Source(s) Source: Manitoba. Chief Electoral Officer (1999). Statement of Votes for the 37th Provincial General Election, September 21, 1999 (PDF) (Report). Winnipeg: Elections Manitoba.

=== 1910 ===
1910 Manitoba general election
Party	Candidate	Votes	%	±%
Conservative	James Johnson	742	56.13	-2.29
Liberal	William Hanley	580	43.87	2.29
Total valid votes		1,322	–	–
Rejected		N/A	–	
Eligible voters / Turnout		1,498	88.25	10.23
Source(s) Source: Manitoba. Chief Electoral Officer (1999). Statement of Votes for the 37th Provincial General Election, September 21, 1999 (PDF) (Report). Winnipeg: Elections Manitoba.

=== 1914 ===
1914 Manitoba general election
Party	Candidate	Votes	%	±%
Conservative	James Johnson	707	52.29	-3.83
Liberal	George William McDonald	645	47.71	3.83
Total valid votes		1,352	–	–
Rejected		N/A	–	
Eligible voters / Turnout		1,453	93.05	4.80
Source(s) Source: Manitoba. Chief Electoral Officer (1999). Statement of Votes for the 37th Provincial General Election, September 21, 1999 (PDF) (Report). Winnipeg: Elections Manitoba.

=== 1915 ===
1915 Manitoba general election
Party	Candidate	Votes	%	±%
Liberal	George William McDonald	687	51.35	3.64
Conservative	James Johnson	651	48.65	-3.64
Total valid votes		1,338	–	–
Rejected		N/A	–	
Eligible voters / Turnout		1,507	88.79	-4.26
Source(s) Source: Manitoba. Chief Electoral Officer (1999). Statement of Votes for the 37th Provincial General Election, September 21, 1999 (PDF) (Report). Winnipeg: Elections Manitoba.

=== 1920 ===
1920 Manitoba general election
Party	Candidate	Votes	%	±%
Liberal	George William McDonald	1,020	50.47	-0.88
Conservative	Richard Gardiner Willis	1,001	49.53	0.88
Total valid votes		2,021	–	–
Rejected		N/A	–	
Eligible voters / Turnout		2,406	84.00	-4.79
Source(s) Source: Manitoba. Chief Electoral Officer (1999). Statement of Votes for the 37th Provincial General Election, September 21, 1999 (PDF) (Report). Winnipeg: Elections Manitoba.

=== 1922 ===
1922 Manitoba general election
Party	Candidate	Votes	%	±%
Conservative	Richard Gardiner Willis	1,059	52.58	3.05
United Farmers	Fawcett Wright Ransom	955	47.42	–
Total valid votes		2,014	–	–
Rejected		N/A	–	
Eligible voters / Turnout		2,443	82.44	-1.56
Source(s) Source: Manitoba. Chief Electoral Officer (1999). Statement of Votes for the 37th Provincial General Election, September 21, 1999 (PDF) (Report). Winnipeg: Elections Manitoba.

=== 1927 ===
1927 Manitoba general election
Party	Candidate	Votes	%	±%
Conservative	Richard Gardiner Willis	1,167	55.10	2.52
Progressive	Duncan Henderson	951	44.90	–
Total valid votes		2,118	–	–
Rejected		N/A	–	
Eligible voters / Turnout		2,574	82.28	-0.16
Source(s) Source: Manitoba. Chief Electoral Officer (1999). Statement of Votes for the 37th Provincial General Election, September 21, 1999 (PDF) (Report). Winnipeg: Elections Manitoba.

=== 1929 by-election ===
Manitoba provincial by-election, June 22, 1929
Party	Candidate	Votes	%	±%
Conservative	Alexander Welch	1,327	57.15	2.05
Liberal–Progressive	William Earl Campbell	995	42.85	–
Total valid votes		2,322	–	–
Rejected		N/A	–	
Eligible voters / Turnout		N/A	–	–
Source(s) Source: Manitoba. Chief Electoral Officer (1999). Statement of Votes for the 37th Provincial General Election, September 21, 1999 (PDF) (Report). Winnipeg: Elections Manitoba.

=== 1932 ===
1932 Manitoba general election
Party	Candidate	Votes	%	±%
Conservative	Alexander Welch	1,322	50.87	-6.28
Liberal–Progressive	Frederick Valentine Bird	1,277	49.13	6.28
Total valid votes		2,599	–	–
Rejected		N/A	–	
Eligible voters / Turnout		2,894	89.81	–
Source(s) Source: Manitoba. Chief Electoral Officer (1999). Statement of Votes for the 37th Provincial General Election, September 21, 1999 (PDF) (Report). Winnipeg: Elections Manitoba.

=== 1936 ===
1936 Manitoba general election
Party	Candidate	Votes	%	±%
Conservative	Alexander Welch	1,526	60.22	9.36
Liberal–Progressive	Frederick Valentine Bird	1,008	39.78	-9.36
Total valid votes		2,534	–	–
Rejected		18	–	
Eligible voters / Turnout		2,966	86.04	-3.76
Source(s) Source: Manitoba. Chief Electoral Officer (1999). Statement of Votes for the 37th Provincial General Election, September 21, 1999 (PDF) (Report). Winnipeg: Elections Manitoba.

=== 1941 ===
1941 Manitoba general election
Party	Candidate	Votes	%	±%
Conservative	Alexander Welch		0.00	-60.22
Total valid votes			–	–
Rejected		N/A	–	
Eligible voters / Turnout		2,757	0.00	-86.04
Source(s) Source: Manitoba. Chief Electoral Officer (1999). Statement of Votes for the 37th Provincial General Election, September 21, 1999 (PDF) (Report). Winnipeg: Elections Manitoba.

=== 1945 ===
1945 Manitoba general election
Party	Candidate	Votes	%	±%
Progressive Conservative	Errick Willis		0.00	–
Total valid votes			–	–
Rejected		N/A	–	
Eligible voters / Turnout		2,652	0.00	0.00
Source(s) Source: Manitoba. Chief Electoral Officer (1999). Statement of Votes for the 37th Provincial General Election, September 21, 1999 (PDF) (Report). Winnipeg: Elections Manitoba.

=== 1949 ===
1949 Manitoba general election
Party	Candidate	Votes	%	±%
Progressive Conservative	Errick Willis		0.00	–
Total valid votes			–	–
Rejected		N/A	–	
Eligible voters / Turnout		4,272	0.00	0.00
Source(s) Source: Manitoba. Chief Electoral Officer (1999). Statement of Votes for the 37th Provincial General Election, September 21, 1999 (PDF) (Report). Winnipeg: Elections Manitoba.

=== 1953 ===
1953 Manitoba general election
Party	Candidate	Votes	%	±%
Progressive Conservative	Errick Willis	1,777	56.11	–
Liberal–Progressive	Charles Clinton Gorrie	883	27.88	–
Social Credit	Vance A. Ferguson	507	16.01	–
Total valid votes		3,167	–	–
Rejected		57	–	
Eligible voters / Turnout		4,101	78.61	78.61
Source(s) Source: Manitoba. Chief Electoral Officer (1999). Statement of Votes for the 37th Provincial General Election, September 21, 1999 (PDF) (Report). Winnipeg: Elections Manitoba.

=== 1958 ===
1958 Manitoba general election
Party	Candidate	Votes	%	±%
Progressive Conservative	Errick Willis	2,949	57.32	1.21
Liberal–Progressive	Edward Dow	1,880	36.54	8.66
Social Credit	Clarence A. Ferguson	316	6.14	-9.87
Total valid votes		5,145	–	–
Rejected		41	–	
Eligible voters / Turnout		6,687	77.55	-1.06
Source(s) Source: Manitoba. Chief Electoral Officer (1999). Statement of Votes for the 37th Provincial General Election, September 21, 1999 (PDF) (Report). Winnipeg: Elections Manitoba.

=== 1959 ===
1959 Manitoba general election
Party	Candidate	Votes	%	±%
Progressive Conservative	Errick Willis	3,247	73.23	15.91
Liberal–Progressive	Walter Christianson	1,187	26.77	-9.77
Total valid votes		4,434	–	–
Rejected		46	–	
Eligible voters / Turnout		6,632	67.55	-10.00
Source(s) Source: Manitoba. Chief Electoral Officer (1999). Statement of Votes for the 37th Provincial General Election, September 21, 1999 (PDF) (Report). Winnipeg: Elections Manitoba.

=== 1959 by-election ===
Manitoba provincial by-election, November 26, 1959 Election of Edward Dow voided
Party	Candidate	Votes	%	±%
Liberal–Progressive	Edward Dow	2,400	51.35	24.58
Progressive Conservative	Robert Cawston Aitkens	2,274	48.65	-24.58
Total valid votes		4,674	–	–
Rejected		46	–	
Eligible voters / Turnout		N/A	–	–
Source(s) Source: Manitoba. Chief Electoral Officer (1999). Statement of Votes for the 37th Provincial General Election, September 21, 1999 (PDF) (Report). Winnipeg: Elections Manitoba.

=== 1962 ===
1962 Manitoba general election
Party	Candidate	Votes	%	±%
Progressive Conservative	Peter J. McDonald	2,788	51.14	2.49
Liberal	Edward Dow	1,973	36.19	–
Social Credit	Charles R. Baskerville	691	12.67	–
Total valid votes		5,452	–	–
Rejected		12	–	
Eligible voters / Turnout		6,616	82.59	–
Source(s) Source: Manitoba. Chief Electoral Officer (1999). Statement of Votes for the 37th Provincial General Election, September 21, 1999 (PDF) (Report). Winnipeg: Elections Manitoba.

=== 1966 ===
1966 Manitoba general election
Party	Candidate	Votes	%	±%
Liberal	Edward Dow	2,149	41.94	5.75
Progressive Conservative	Peter J. McDonald	2,144	41.84	-9.29
Social Credit	Peter H. Sawatsky	690	13.47	0.79
New Democratic	Selwyn Burrows	141	2.75	–
Total valid votes		5,124	–	–
Rejected		28	–	
Eligible voters / Turnout		7,506	68.64	-13.95
Source(s) Source: Manitoba. Chief Electoral Officer (1999). Statement of Votes for the 37th Provincial General Election, September 21, 1999 (PDF) (Report). Winnipeg: Elections Manitoba.

=== 1968 by-election ===
Manitoba provincial by-election, March 4, 1968
Party	Candidate	Votes	%	±%
Liberal	Edward Dow	2,443	46.31	4.37
Progressive Conservative	Allan M. Rose	2,235	42.37	0.53
Social Credit	Peter H. Sawatsky	597	11.32	-2.15
Total valid votes		5,275	–	–
Rejected		N/A	–	
Eligible voters / Turnout		N/A	–	–
Source(s) Source: Manitoba. Chief Electoral Officer (1999). Statement of Votes for the 37th Provincial General Election, September 21, 1999 (PDF) (Report). Winnipeg: Elections Manitoba.

=== 1981 ===
1981 Manitoba general election
Party	Candidate	Votes	%	±%
Progressive Conservative	Brian Ransom	4,775	72.36	29.99
New Democratic	Joan Johannson	1,660	25.16	–
Independent	Bill Harrison	164	2.49	–
Total valid votes		6,599	–	–
Rejected		33	–	
Eligible voters / Turnout		10,533	62.96	–
Source(s) Source: Manitoba. Chief Electoral Officer (1999). Statement of Votes for the 37th Provincial General Election, September 21, 1999 (PDF) (Report). Winnipeg: Elections Manitoba.

=== 1986 ===
1986 Manitoba general election
Party	Candidate	Votes	%	±%
Progressive Conservative	Denis Rocan	3,390	47.51	-24.85
New Democratic	Gordon Kennedy	1,353	18.96	-6.19
Liberal	Ross McMillan	1,242	17.41	–
Confederation of Regions	Bob Yake	1,150	16.12	–
Total valid votes		7,135	–	–
Rejected		15	–	
Eligible voters / Turnout		10,328	69.23	6.27
Source(s) Source: Manitoba. Chief Electoral Officer (1999). Statement of Votes for the 37th Provincial General Election, September 21, 1999 (PDF) (Report). Winnipeg: Elections Manitoba.

=== 1988 ===
1988 Manitoba general election
Party	Candidate	Votes	%	±%
Progressive Conservative	Denis Rocan	3,208	41.68	-5.83
Liberal	Ross McMillan	2,610	33.91	16.51
Independent	Rod Stephenson	767	9.97	–
Confederation of Regions	Harold Parsonage	476	6.19	-9.93
New Democratic	John Miller	446	5.80	-13.17
Independent	Uncle Bill Harrison	102	1.33	–
Western Independence	William R. Comer	87	1.13	–
Total valid votes		7,696	–	–
Rejected		17	–	
Eligible voters / Turnout		10,325	74.70	5.47
Source(s) Source: Manitoba. Chief Electoral Officer (1999). Statement of Votes for the 37th Provincial General Election, September 21, 1999 (PDF) (Report). Winnipeg: Elections Manitoba.

=== 1990 ===
1990 Manitoba general election
Party	Candidate	Votes	%	±%
Progressive Conservative	Bob Rose	4,702	58.68	17.00
Liberal	Doug Collins	2,091	26.10	-7.82
New Democratic	Robert Smith	1,047	13.07	7.27
Independent	Rod Stephenson	173	2.16	-7.81
Total valid votes		8,013	–	–
Rejected		7	–	
Eligible voters / Turnout		12,024	66.70	-8.00
Source(s) Source: Manitoba. Chief Electoral Officer (1999). Statement of Votes for the 37th Provincial General Election, September 21, 1999 (PDF) (Report). Winnipeg: Elections Manitoba.

=== 1995 ===
1995 Manitoba general election
Party	Candidate	Votes	%	±%
Progressive Conservative	Merv Tweed	4,781	60.90	2.22
Liberal	Doug Collins	1,735	22.10	-3.99
New Democratic	Robert Smith	1,334	16.99	3.93
Total valid votes		7,850	–	–
Rejected		31	–	
Eligible voters / Turnout		11,800	66.79	0.09
Source(s) Source: Manitoba. Chief Electoral Officer (1999). Statement of Votes for the 37th Provincial General Election, September 21, 1999 (PDF) (Report). Winnipeg: Elections Manitoba.

=== 1999 ===
1999 Manitoba general election
Party	Candidate	Votes	%	±%	Expenditures
Progressive Conservative	Merv Tweed	4,037	56.18	-4.73	$22,666.64
New Democratic	Janet Brady	1,902	26.47	9.47	$3,995.00
Liberal	Lorne Hanks	1,247	17.35	-4.75	$3,988.93
Total valid votes		7,186	–	–	
Rejected		50	–		
Eligible voters / turnout		12,303	58.81	-7.97	
Source(s) Source: Manitoba. Chief Electoral Officer (1999). Statement of Votes for the 37th Provincial General Election, September 21, 1999 (PDF) (Report). Winnipeg: Elections Manitoba.

=== 2003 ===
2003 Manitoba general election
Party	Candidate	Votes	%	±%
Progressive Conservative	Merv Tweed	3,956	60.01	3.83
New Democratic	Lonnie Patterson	1,893	28.72	2.25
Liberal	Bev Leadbeater	743	11.27	-6.08
Total valid votes		6,592	–	–
Rejected		25	–	
Eligible voters / Turnout		12,062	54.86	-3.96
Source(s) Source: Manitoba. Chief Electoral Officer (2003). Statement of Votes for the 38th Provincial General Election, June 3, 2003 (PDF) (Report). Winnipeg: Elections Manitoba.

=== 2004 by-election ===
Manitoba provincial by-election, July 2, 2004 Resignation of Merv Tweed
Party	Candidate	Votes	%	±%	Expenditures
Progressive Conservative	Cliff Cullen	3,632	63.01	3.00	$11,273.31
Liberal	Bev Leadbeater	1,084	18.81	7.54	$2,256.63
New Democratic	Betty Storie	1,048	18.18	-10.53	$12,037.72
Total valid votes		5,764	–	–	
Rejected		12	–		
Eligible voters / turnout		12,267	47.10	–	
Source(s) Source:

=== 2007 ===
2007 Manitoba general election
Party	Candidate	Votes	%	±%	Expenditures
Progressive Conservative	Cliff Cullen	4,318	66.10	3.08	$15,425.52
New Democratic	Faron Douglas	1,476	22.59	4.41	$3,785.64
Liberal	Allen Hunter	739	11.31	-7.49	$3,458.77
Total valid votes		6,533	–	–	
Rejected		42	–		
Eligible voters / turnout		12,089	54.39	7.29	
Source(s) Source: Manitoba. Chief Electoral Officer (2007). Statement of Votes for the 39th Provincial General Election, May 22, 2007 (PDF) (Report). Winnipeg: Elections Manitoba.

=== 2019 ===
2016 provincial election redistributed results
Party	%
Progressive Conservative	76.1
New Democratic	8.7
Manitoba	7.4
Liberal	4.4
Green	3.4

2019 Manitoba general election
Party	Candidate	Votes	%	±%	Expenditures
Progressive Conservative	Doyle Piwniuk	6,210	67.48	-8.7	$6,900.23
Green	David Neufeld	1,372	14.91	11.5	$124.08
New Democratic	Angie Herrera-Hildebrand	1,003	10.90	2.2	$636.58
Liberal	Richard Davies	618	6.72	2.3	$435.68
Total valid votes		9,203	–	–	
Rejected		80	–		
Eligible voters / turnout		16,206	57.28	2.89	
Source(s) Source: Manitoba. Chief Electoral Officer (2019). Statement of Votes for the 42nd Provincial General Election, September 10, 2019 (PDF) (Report). Winnipeg: Elections Manitoba. "Candidate Election Returns". Elections Manitoba.

=== 2023 ===
2023 Manitoba general election
Party	Candidate	Votes	%	±%	Expenditures
Progressive Conservative	Doyle Piwniuk	4,806	55.05	-12.43	$12,216.90
New Democratic	Lorna Canada-Vanegas Mesa	1,993	22.83	+11.93	$1,865.92
Keystone	Kevin Friesen	1,507	17.26	–	$5,551.67
Liberal	Ali Tarar	425	4.87	-1.85	$2,444.23
Total valid votes/expense limit		8,731	99.36	–	$61,679.00
Total rejected and declined ballots		56	0.64	–	
Turnout		8,787	55.64	-1.65	
Eligible voters		15,794			
Progressive Conservative hold		Swing		-12.18	
Source(s) Source: Elections Manitoba

== See also ==
- List of Manitoba provincial electoral districts
- Canadian provincial electoral districts
