= Peter J. McDonald =

Canadian politician

Peter James McDonald
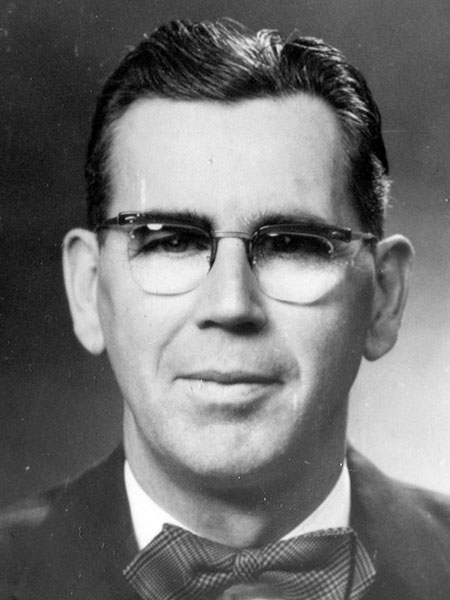

Vice-President of the Killarney Industrial Development Board, Killarney town councillor
- In office 1954–1958

Mayor of Killarney
- In office 1959–1963

Member of the Legislative Assembly of Manitoba for Turtle Mountain
- In office 14 December 1962 – 23 June 1966

Personal details
- Born: July 16, 1912 Cartwright, Manitoba, Canada
- Died: May 4, 1971 (aged 53) Victoria, BC, Canada
- Party: Progressive Conservative Party of Manitoba
- Other political affiliations: Progressive Conservative
- Spouse: Elizabeth Doris Mitchell (m. 1941)

Peter J. McDonald (July 16, 1912, in Cartwright, Manitoba – May 4, 1971, in Victoria B.C.) was a politician in Manitoba, Canada. He was a Progressive Conservative member of the Legislative Assembly of Manitoba from 1962 to 1966.

McDonald was educated at Holmfield, Manitoba and worked as an International Harvester dealer and farmer, also raising purebred Hereford cattle. He served as vice-president of the Industrial Development Board of Killarney, was a councillor in that town from 1954 to 1958, and served as its mayor from 1959 to 1963.

He was elected to the Manitoba legislature in the 1962 provincial election, defeating incumbent Liberal Edward Dow by 1,015 votes in the constituency of Turtle Mountain. He served as a backbench supporter of Dufferin Roblin's government during his time in the legislature. In the 1966 election, he lost to Dow by only five votes. He did not seek a return to the legislature after this time.

McDonald moved to Victoria, British Columbia around 1967 and died there a few years later.
