= Souris (electoral district) =

Former federal electoral district in Manitoba, Canada

Souris was a federal electoral district in the province of Manitoba, Canada, that was represented in the House of Commons of Canada from 1904 to 1953.

This riding was created in 1903 from parts of Brandon and Lisgar ridings. In 1952, the constituency was merged with the constituency of Brandon to form the district of Brandon—Souris.

== Members of Parliament ==
This riding has elected the following members of Parliament:

- 1904-1917: Frederick Laurence Schaffner - Conservative Party of Canada
- 1917-1921: Albert Ernest Finley - Unionist Party
- 1921-1930: James Steedsman - Progressive Party of Canada
- 1930-1935: Errick French Willis - Progressive Conservative
- 1935-1940: George William McDonald - Progressive Conservative
- 1940-1952: James Arthur Ross - National Government (1940–1945), Progressive Conservative (1945–1952)

== Election results ==
1949 Canadian federal election
| Party | Candidate | Votes |
|---|---|---|
| Progressive Conservative | James Arthur Ross | 6,108 |
| Liberal | Edward Ingo Dow | 5,495 |
| Co-operative Commonwealth | George Thomas Watson | 1,083 |

1945 Canadian federal election
| Party | Candidate | Votes |
|---|---|---|
| Progressive Conservative | James Arthur Ross | 6,177 |
| Liberal | Thomas Matthew McIlwraith | 2,640 |
| Co-operative Commonwealth | Roderick Guy Craven | 1,838 |

1940 Canadian federal election
| Party | Candidate | Votes |
|---|---|---|
| National Government | James Arthur Ross | 4,991 |
| Liberal | George William McDonald | 4,861 |
| Co-operative Commonwealth | Alex H. Parkes | 1,370 |

1935 Canadian federal election
| Party | Candidate | Votes |
|---|---|---|
| Liberal–Progressive | George William McDonald | 4,504 |
| Conservative | Errick French Willis | 4,501 |
| Co-operative Commonwealth | Alex H. Parkes | 953 |
| Reconstruction | William Humboldt Clandenning | 631 |

1930 Canadian federal election
| Party | Candidate | Votes |
|---|---|---|
| Conservative | Errick French Willis | 6,252 |
| Progressive | James Steedsman | 5,780 |

1926 Canadian federal election
| Party | Candidate | Votes |
|---|---|---|
| Progressive | James Steedsman | 6,105 |
| Conservative | Errick French Willis | 4,946 |

1925 Canadian federal election
| Party | Candidate | Votes |
|---|---|---|
| Progressive | James Steedsman | 3,509 |
| Conservative | William Willson | 3,258 |
| Liberal | John Williams | 1,563 |

1921 Canadian federal election
| Party | Candidate | Votes |
|---|---|---|
| Progressive | James Steedsman | 7,380 |
| Conservative | Richard Gardiner Willis | 3,714 |

1917 Canadian federal election
| Party | Candidate | Votes |
|---|---|---|
| Government (Unionist) | Albert Ernest Finley | acclaimed |

1911 Canadian federal election
| Party | Candidate | Votes |
|---|---|---|
| Conservative | Frederick Laurence Schaffner | 3,150 |
| Liberal | Archibald McIntyre Campbell | 3,086 |

1908 Canadian federal election
| Party | Candidate | Votes |
|---|---|---|
| Conservative | Frederick Laurence Schaffner | 3,310 |
| Liberal | Archibald McIntyre Campbell | 2,429 |

1904 Canadian federal election
| Party | Candidate | Votes |
|---|---|---|
| Conservative | Frederick Laurence Schaffner | 3,123 |
| Liberal | George Paterson | 2,603 |

== See also ==
- Brandon—Souris
- List of Canadian electoral districts
- Historical federal electoral districts of Canada
