= Denis Rocan =

Canadian politician

26th Speaker of the Legislative Assembly of Manitoba
- In office July 21, 1988 – May 22, 1995
- Preceded by: Myrna Phillips
- Succeeded by: Louise Dacquay

Member of the Legislative Assembly of Manitoba for Turtle Mountain
- In office March 18, 1986 – May 22, 2007
- Preceded by: Brian Ransom
- Succeeded by: Bob Rose

Personal details
- Born: February 14, 1949 (age 77) Somerset, Manitoba
- Party: Progressive Conservative Party
- Education: Otterburne College
- Occupation: Farmer, trucker

Denis Rocan (born February 14, 1949) is a former politician from Manitoba, Canada. He was a member of the Legislative Assembly of Manitoba from 1986 to 2007, and served as speaker of the assembly from 1988 to 1995. Rocan was a member of the Progressive Conservative Party, but became an independent in 2007.

== Life ==
Rocan was born to a French-Canadian family in Somerset, Manitoba and was raised in north-end Winnipeg. He is also Métis by background and a direct descendant of Jean-Baptiste Lagimodière and Marie-Anne Gaboury, the maternal grandparents of Louis Riel. He was educated at Sacré-Coeur in Winnipeg, Somerset Collegiate and Otterburne College. He is fluently bilingual in English and French. Rocan worked as a farmer before entering political life, and also operated a building and moving company and a grain business. He is a Shriner and a freemason, as well as a member of the Royal Canadian Legion.

He was first elected to the Manitoba legislature in the 1986 provincial election, winning the rural, southern constituency of Turtle Mountain. Rural seats in southern Manitoba are generally considered safe for the Progressive Conservative party, and Rocan was elected by more than 2,000 votes over his nearest opponent. The New Democratic Party won the election, and Rocan served as a member of the opposition.

Rocan was re-elected over Liberal candidate Ross McMillan in the 1988 election, though his majority was cut to about 600 votes. The Progressive Conservatives emerged from this election with a minority government, and Rocan was appointed as speaker of the assembly by premier Gary Filmon on July 21, 1988. He was the first Franco-Manitoban to serve as speaker for the provincial assembly.

Support for the Liberal Party declined in the 1990 provincial election, and Rocan was easily re-elected in the redistributed constituency of Gladstone. He won the constituency a second time in the 1995 election, but was not re-appointed as speaker and served for the next four years as a backbench supporter of Filmon's government. Rocan was respected by all parties in the legislature, and his tenure as speaker was free of the controversies over partisanship which plagued his successor, Louise Dacquay.

Further redistribution brought Rocan into the riding of Carman for the 1999 provincial election. He was easily returned, and was re-elected again in the 2003 election. The Progressive Conservatives lost both elections to the New Democratic Party, and Rocan served as a member of the opposition. A former smoker, he supported premier Gary Doer's efforts to ban public smoking in 2003.

Rocan supported his friend Reg Alcock in the federal elections of 2000 and 2004, even though Alcock was a Liberal. Alcock won his re-election bids in Winnipeg South in those years.

On November 16, 2006, Rocan lost the Carman Conservative nomination to Blaine Pedersen. On April 18, 2007, Rocan was removed from the Conservative caucus for supporting the NDP budget, which his party opposed. He considered running as an independent candidate in the 2007 election, but declined.

== Electoral record ==
2003 Manitoba general election: Carman
Party	Candidate	Votes	%	±%	Expenditures
Progressive Conservative	Denis Rocan	3,523	51.86	+3.05	$21,274.32
Liberal	Don Oldcorn	1,825	26.87	−3.37	$11,694.92
New Democratic	Bill Harrison	1,445	21.27	+1.22	$3,019.50
Total valid votes		6,793	99.62		
Rejected and declined ballots		26			
Turnout		6,819	54.14	−6.33	
Electors on the lists		12,595			
