= Harold Elliott (artist) =

Canadian painter

- Born: Harold Herbert Elliott; 27 March 1890; Killarney, Manitoba
- Died: 28 August 1968 (aged 78); Burnaby, British Columbia
- Known for: Painter
- Movement: Fauvism, Surrealism, Expressionism

Harold Herbert Elliott (1890–1968) was a Canadian artist.

== Biography ==
The parents of Harold Hebert Elliott were pioneers in Killarney, Manitoba, and Elliott was the eldest of ten children. Before arriving in British Columbia in 1920, Elliot was variously a homesteader in Fielding, Saskatchewan, a school-teacher, a prospector and a poet. He ran a pickle-manufacturing business for 10 years. His first marriage had resulted in two children, and in 1927 Elliott married again, to Elizabeth West Henderson. He began painting in 1948, as recommended by his doctor following a heart failure. Elliott was often described as eccentric. In order to evoke the creative spirit, he liked to wear long gypsy-like robes. He sometimes adopted personae of his own creation, or imaginatively emulated idols such as Rembrandt, Turner, and Emily Carr. His asking price for his works was extremely high, and he completely refused to part with some pieces. Elliott claimed to have painted over 5000 pictures. His paintings are often signed "Van Volkingburgh", after his mother's family name." In 1964, three of his paintings were featured in New Talents B.C. at the Vancouver Art Gallery. Elliott donated much of his art collection, and many of his own works, to the J. A. Victor David museum located in his hometown of Killarney.

== Style ==
Most often constructed on cardboard, his paintings are generally small. In Elliott's early work, he used materials like shoe polish and red ink, overlaid with thick varnish in order to achieve an effect like the old masters. He preferred to concentrate on one colour at a time. His landscapes typically have wandering, vaguely human figures, with an overall sense of approaching menace. A melancholy mood is commonly established by the sun never really breaking through the clouds. Circular shapes frequently recur. Another motif is triangulation, whereby a single figure observes two others from a distance. Later paintings have faceless figures with large blank eyes. Doris Shadbolt remarked that Elliott "is a kind of visionary painter. His work is completely apart from the historical stream of art," a summation echoed by David Watmough. His paintings have an overall "unlearned" aspect, anticipating later trends.

== Solo exhibitions ==
- Painting Against Time, Or Gallery, Vancouver, 1987
- Danish Art Gallery, Vancouver, 1965

== Group exhibitions ==
- New Talents BC, Vancouver Art Gallery, 1964.
- Seattle Art Museum, 1961–1963
- British Columbia Artists Annual Exhibitions, Vancouver Art Gallery, 1952–1954, 1957, 1961–1963, 1965

== Collections ==
- Seattle Art Museum

== Sources ==
- "Artist Harold Elliott of way-out fame dies". The Province. Vancouver. 30 August 1968. Archived from the original on 3 April 2021 – via Newspapers.com.
- Dolman, Dick (6 April 1963). "Born to paint in colors: Artist's work poetic, strange". The Province. Vancouver. Archived from the original on 3 April 2021 – via Newspapers.com.
- Haraldsson, Arni Runar (Winter 1987). "Harold Herbert Elliott". C Magazine (12). Toronto. Archived from the original on 31 March 2021.
- Stoffman, Danny (28 May 1964). "Harold's Out of Pickles, But He Still Sees Green". The Vancouver Sun. Archived from the original on 3 April 2021 – via Newspapers.com.
- "Untitled". Star-Phoenix (obituary). Saskatoon. 18 September 1968. Archived from the original on 3 April 2021 – via Newspapers.com.
- Watmough, David (9 January 1965). "Exhilarating Art Defies Labelling: Elliott Exhibit at Gallery Escapes Tradition, Trends". The Vancouver Sun. Archived from the original on 3 April 2021 – via Newspapers.com.
- Wilkins, Tom (6 September 1972). "Leprechaun Country". The Brandon Sun. Archived from the original on 7 April 2021 – via Newspapers.com.
