= Manitoba Democratic Movement =

The Manitoba Democratic Movement (MDM) was a political pressure group in Manitoba, Canada. It existed from 1949 to 1950, as a faction within the province's Progressive Conservative (PC) Party. The MDM opposed the PC Party's continued participation in a coalition ministry with the Liberal-Progressive Party, which had governed the province since 1940.

The MDM was formed in 1949 by businessman George Hastings and independent Progressive Conservative legislator John McDowell. Not a political party as such, it called for the Progressive Conservatives to quit the governing alliance and supplant the socialist Co-operative Commonwealth Federation as the province's "government in waiting". Hastings and McDowell were both on the right wing of the PC Party, and feared that the CCF would be able to form government if it remained the primary opposition.

The MDM received financial support from breweries and other business interests. According to historian David McCormick, its objectives were "economy in provincial administration, close scrutiny of new spending proposals and a reduction in the size of the Legislature and Cabinet to save money."

Under pressure from the MDM and others, Progressive Conservative leader Errick Willis resigned from the coalition ministry in mid-1950. The PCs formally left the coalition at their annual party convention in October after only sixteen delegates voted for continuing in the coalition. Hastings stood against Willis for the party leadership and lost by 188 votes to 45. The MDM had accomplished its main aim, however, and most of its members accepted Willis's continued leadership of the party.
