= Errick Willis =

Canadian politician and Olympic curler (1896-1967)

The Honourable Errick French Willis

15th Lieutenant Governor of Manitoba
- In office January 15, 1960 – November 1, 1965
- Monarch: Elizabeth II
- Governor General: Georges Vanier
- Premier: Duff Roblin
- Preceded by: John Stewart McDiarmid
- Succeeded by: Richard Spink Bowles

Member of Parliament for Souris
- In office July 28, 1930 – October 14, 1935
- Preceded by: James Steedsman
- Succeeded by: George William McDonald

Member of the Legislative Assembly of Manitoba for Deloraine
- In office July 27, 1936 – October 15, 1945
- Preceded by: Hugh McKenzie
- Succeeded by: James O. Argue

Member of the Legislative Assembly of Manitoba for Turtle Mountain
- In office October 15, 1945 – November 26, 1959
- Preceded by: Alexander Welch
- Succeeded by: Edward Dow

Personal details
- Born: March 21, 1896 Boissevain, Manitoba, Canada
- Died: January 9, 1967 (aged 70) Winnipeg, Manitoba, Canada
- Party: Conservative
- Other political affiliations: Conservative
- Relations: R.G. Willis (father)
- Education: University of Toronto; University of Manitoba
- Occupation: Lawyer and Farmer
- Profession: Politician

Olympic medal record

Men's Curling
Gold medal – first place	1932 Lake Placid	Curling (demonstration)

Errick French Willis (March 21, 1896 – January 9, 1967) was a politician in Manitoba, Canada. He served as leader of the province's Conservative Party between 1936 and 1954, and was responsible for beginning and ending the party's alliance with the Liberal-Progressive Party. He also served as Manitoba's 15th Lieutenant Governor between 1960 and 1965.

== Early life and education ==
Willis was born in Boissevain, Manitoba. He was the son of R.G. Willis, himself the leader of the Conservative Party from 1919 to 1920.

The younger Willis received a BA from the University of Toronto, an MA from the University of Manitoba and an LL.B from the University of Manitoba. He subsequently worked as a barrister and farmer, and was involved in local masonic organizations. Willis married Louise Isabel Trimble Willis.

== Political career ==
Willis began his political career at the federal level. He was a Conservative, but used the label "Progressive-Conservative" in Souris in the election of 1926, and was defeated by a straight Progressive candidate. He won the riding in the 1930 election, again having contested it as a "Progressive-Conservative" and served for five years as a backbench supporter of R.B. Bennett's Conservative government. In 1932, outside politics, Willis was a member of the Canadian curling team that won a gold medal in the curling event at the 1932 Winter Olympics.

He was defeated in the 1935 election, losing by three votes to the Liberal candidate.

Willis was acclaimed as leader of the provincial Conservative Party on June 9, 1936, replacing W. Sanford Evans. He was elected for the riding of Deloraine in a provincial election held later in the year.

The election of 1936 was very close, with John Bracken's Liberal-Progressives winning 23 seats in the Legislative Assembly of Manitoba and Willis's Conservatives winning 16. Another 16 seats were won by smaller parties. There were rumours of a Bracken-Willis coalition after the election, but this plan was rejected by the Conservative leader.

After the start of World War II, the idea of an all-party coalition was revived by Bracken's government. The Conservatives, Social Credit and the Cooperative Commonwealth Federation joined Bracken's Liberal-Progressives in a "non-partisan government", meant to demonstrate the united resolve of the province. Willis was sworn in as Minister of Public Works on November 4, 1940. When CCF leader Seymour Farmer resigned in 1942, Willis also became Minister of Labour, holding this position until 1944.

The coalition was generally advantageous to the Conservative Party, which was renamed the Progressive Conservative (PC) Party in the mid-1940s. Its ministers were allowed a fair degree of autonomy, and were fully integrated into the province's governing structure, unlike the CCF and Social Credit ministers, who were marginalized. The party maintained an identity separate from the Liberal-Progressives throughout this period. In a 1946 manifesto, its members pledged to support an increase in old-age pensions, a decrease in tariff rates, and further transportation openings to the province's north. Willis, supported by the Liberal-Progressives, was re-elected by acclamation in 1941, 1945 and 1949.

There were some Progressive Conservatives who opposed the coalition, particularly after Liberal-Progressive Member of the Legislative Assembly (MLA) Douglas Campbell became the province's premier in 1948. The Conservatives had nominated Willis to be premier, but Campbell defeated him in a vote among coalition MLAs. Campbell's philosophy of "minimal government" was rejected by the more progressive figures in the PC ranks, the most vocal of whom was Dufferin Roblin (grandson of former Premier Sir Rodmond Roblin). In 1949, Roblin was elected to the legislature for Winnipeg South as an anti-coalition Progressive Conservative.

Under pressure from his party and disturbed by the Campbell government's inaction on various issues, Willis resigned from cabinet on August 19, 1950. At a party convention in October, the Progressive Conservatives voted 215 to 17 to leave the coalition. Willis, who also fended off a leadership challenge from George Hastings at the convention, once again became leader of the opposition.

Willis was re-elected for Turtle Mountain in the provincial election of 1953, but the provincial Progressive Conservative organization was weak, and Campbell's Liberal-Progressives won a decisive majority. MLA J. Arthur Ross forced a leadership convention in 1954; at this convention, Roblin defeated Willis to become party leader.

Willis continued as a member of the legislature after this loss. He was re-elected in 1958, and served in Roblin's minority government as Minister of Public Works, Minister of Agriculture and Deputy Premier. Re-elected again in 1959, he continued to serve in cabinet until January 15, 1960, when he was appointed as the province's lieutenant governor. He remained in this position until August 31, 1965.

== Death ==
Willis died in Winnipeg on January 9, 1967.
