= James Johnson (Manitoba politician) =

Canadian politician (1855–1929)

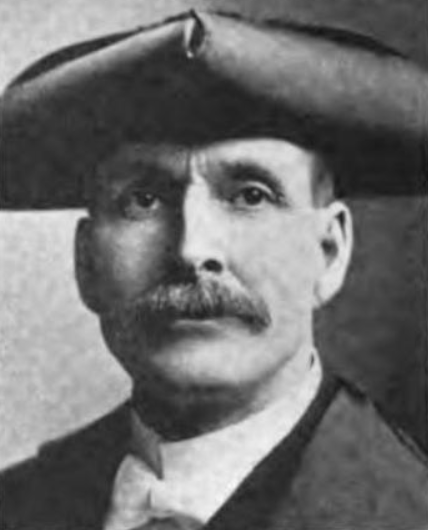

12th Speaker of the Legislative Assembly of Manitoba
- In office January 7, 1904 – January 6, 1916
- Preceded by: William Hespeler
- Succeeded by: James Bryson Baird

Member of the Legislative Assembly of Manitoba for Turtle Mountain
- In office November 27, 1897 – August 6, 1915
- Preceded by: John Hettle
- Succeeded by: George William McDonald

Personal details
- Born: November 18, 1855 Mitchell, Canada West
- Died: February 6, 1929 (aged 73) Boissevain, Manitoba
- Party: Conservative Party
- Occupation: Farmer, land owner

James Johnson (November 18, 1855 – February 6, 1929) was a politician in Manitoba, Canada. He served in the Legislative Assembly of Manitoba from 1897 to 1915, as a member of the Conservative Party. Johnson was a cabinet minister in the government of Hugh John Macdonald, and was named speaker of the assembly in 1904.

Johnson was born in Mitchell, Canada West (now Ontario), the son of John Johnson, and was educated in that community. He worked as a farmer, and served as president of the Boissevain Land Company. Johnson was a reeve and councillor in Morton, and served as mayor of Boissevain. In religion, he was a member of the Church of England. In 1879, he married Susannah Oliver.

Johnson was first elected to the Manitoba legislature in a by-election held on November 27, 1897 in the constituency of Turtle Mountain following the death of John Hettle. Running as an independent Conservative, he defeated his Liberal opponent by 150 votes. He was re-elected as an independent Conservative in the 1899 provincial election, defeating Liberal J.S. Reikie by an increased margin.

The Conservatives won a majority government in this election, and Johnson was appointed to cabinet on January 10, 1900 as a minister without portfolio in Hugh John Macdonald's government. He was dropped from cabinet on October 29, 1900, when Rodmond Roblin replaced Macdonald as premier.

Johnson was re-elected as an official Conservative candidate in the 1903 provincial election, and was chosen as speaker of the assembly on January 7, 1904. He held this position for the next eleven years, until his departure from the legislature in 1915. He was re-elected without difficulty in the elections of 1907 and 1910, and defeated Liberal challenger George William McDonald by sixty-two votes in the 1914 election.

The Conservative administration of Rodmond Roblin was forced to resign from office in 1915, amid a serious corruption scandal. A new general election was called, which the Liberals won in a landslide. Johnson lost to George McDonald by thirty-six votes, in a rematch from the previous year. He died in Boissevain in 1929.
