= List of population centres in Manitoba =

A population centre, in Canadian census data, is a populated place, or a cluster of interrelated populated places, which meets the demographic characteristics of an urban area, having a population of at least 1,000 people and a population density of no fewer than 400 persons per square km^{2}.

The term was introduced in the Canada 2011 Census; prior to that, Statistics Canada used the term urban area.

In the 2021 Census of Population, Statistics Canada listed 54 population centres in the province of Manitoba.

== List ==
The below table is a list of those population centres in Manitoba from the 2021 Census of Population as designated, named, and delineated by Statistics Canada.

Rank	Population centre	Size group	Population (2021)	Population (2016)	Change	Land area (km^{2})	Population density
1	Winnipeg	Large urban	758,515	712,858	+6.4%	356.99	2,124.8/km^{2}
2	Brandon	Medium	50,532	48,345	+4.5%	28.73	1,758.9/km^{2}
3	Steinbach	Small	17,589	15,790	+11.4%	17.8	988.1/km^{2}
4	Winkler	Small	15,335	14,311	+7.2%	19.02	806.3/km^{2}
5	Portage la Prairie	Small	12,944	13,013	−0.5%	9.93	1,303.5/km^{2}
6	Thompson	Small	12,329	13,037	−5.4%	7.81	1,578.6/km^{2}
7	Selkirk	Small	9,761	9,604	+1.6%	5.93	1,646.0/km^{2}
8	Morden	Small	9,103	8,058	+13.0%	8.53	1,067.2/km^{2}
9	Dauphin	Small	8,034	8,233	−2.4%	7.95	1,010.6/km^{2}
10	The Pas	Small	7,302	6,402	+14.1%	8.4	869.3/km^{2}
11	Niverville	Small	5,593	4,363	+28.2%	4.23	1,322.2/km^{2}
12	Stonewall	Small	5,046	4,809	+4.9%	5.96	846.6/km^{2}
13	Oakbank	Small	5,041	4,604	+9.5%	5.39	935.3/km^{2}
14	Neepawa	Small	4,938	3,939	+25.4%	2.36	2,092.4/km^{2}
15	Flin Flon	Small	4,722	4,810	−1.8%	3.74	1,262.6/km^{2}
16	Altona	Small	4,227	4,177	+1.2%	4.8	880.6/km^{2}
17	Swan River	Small	3,989	3,969	+0.5%	5.73	696.2/km^{2}
18	Lorette	Small	3,230	2,904	+11.2%	3.15	1,025.4/km^{2}
19	Mitchell	Small	3,136	2,523	+24.3%	4.08	768.6/km^{2}
20	Beausejour	Small	3,123	3,003	+4.0%	3.11	1,004.2/km^{2}
21	Carman	Small	2,970	3,022	−1.7%	2.85	1,042.1/km^{2}
22	Virden	Small	2,904	3,082	−5.8%	2.33	1,246.4/km^{2}
23	Ste. Anne	Small	2,891	2,114	+36.8%	4.14	698.3/km^{2}
24	Killarney	Small	2,499	2,315	+7.9%	3.45	724.3/km^{2}
25	La Salle	Small	2,471	1,874	+31.9%	3	823.7/km^{2}
26	Minnedosa	Small	2,407	2,224	+8.2%	2.23	1,079.4/km^{2}
27	Gimli	Small	2,345	2,251	+4.2%	3.02	776.5/km^{2}
28	Stony Mountain	Small	2,160	1,800	+20.0%	1.99	1,085.4/km^{2}
29	Souris	Small	1,935	1,900	+1.8%	2.5	774.0/km^{2}
30	Cross Lake 19A	Small	1,826	2,041	−10.5%	3.3	553.3/km^{2}
31	Carberry	Small	1,823	1,748	+4.3%	2.4	759.6/km^{2}
32	Morris	Small	1,801	1,714	+5.1%	2.26	796.9/km^{2}
33	Grunthal	Small	1,782	1,680	+6.1%	2.7	660.0/km^{2}
34	Blumenort	Small	1,738	1,675	+3.8%	3.17	548.3/km^{2}
35	Wasagamack	Small	1,689	579	+191.7%	3.66	461.5/km^{2}
36	Russell	Small	1,622	1,498	+8.3%	1.9	853.7/km^{2}
37	Roblin	Small	1,603	1,614	−0.7%	2.71	591.5/km^{2}
38	St. Adolphe	Small	1,595	1,367	+16.7%	1.74	916.7/km^{2}
39	Ile des Chênes	Small	1,572	1,528	+2.9%	1.83	859.0/km^{2}
40	Boissevain	Small	1,567	1,656	−5.4%	2.54	616.9/km^{2}
41	Pinawa	Small	1,512	1,441	+4.9%	2.14	706.5/km^{2}
42	Oak Bluff	Small	1,442	1,051	+37.2%	2.52	572.2/km^{2}
43	Cross Lake 19	Small	1,387	1,252	+10.8%	3.05	454.8/km^{2}
44	Shilo CFB-BFC	Small	1,362	1,419	−4.0%	1.25	1,089.6/km^{2}
45	Nelson House 170	Small	1,351	1,675	−19.3%	2.7	500.4/km^{2}
46	La Broquerie	Small	1,332	1,034	+28.8%	2.98	447.0/km^{2}
47	St-Pierre-Jolys	Small	1,305	1,170	+11.5%	2.61	500.0/km^{2}
48	Landmark	Small	1,284	1,237	+3.8%	2.22	578.4/km^{2}
49	Arborg	Small	1,279	1,222	+4.7%	2	639.5/km^{2}
50	Chemawawin 2	Small	1,163	1,131	+2.8%	1.51	770.2/km^{2}
51	Teulon	Small	1,087	1,095	−0.7%	1.87	581.3/km^{2}
52	St. Theresa Point	Small	1,083	1,038	+4.3%	1.53	707.8/km^{2}
53	Lac du Bonnet	Small	1,064	1,089	−2.3%	2.26	470.8/km^{2}
54	St. Andrews	Small	1,001	1,026	−2.4%	2.33	429.6/km^{2}

== See also ==
- List of the largest population centres in Canada
