= Blaine Pedersen =

Canadian politician

Minister of Agriculture and Resource Development
- In office October 23, 2019 – July 15, 2021
- Premier: Brian Pallister
- Preceded by: Ralph Eichler
- Succeeded by: Ralph Eichler

Minister of Growth, Enterprise and Trade
- In office August 17, 2017 – October 23, 2019
- Premier: Brian Pallister
- Preceded by: Cliff Cullen
- Succeeded by: Ralph Eichler

Minister of Infrastructure
- In office May 3, 2016 – August 17, 2017
- Premier: Brian Pallister
- Preceded by: Steve Ashton
- Succeeded by: Ron Schuler

Member of the Legislative Assembly of Manitoba for Midland
- In office October 4, 2011 – September 5, 2023
- Preceded by: first member
- Succeeded by: Lauren Stone

Member of the Legislative Assembly of Manitoba for Carman
- In office May 22, 2007 – October 4, 2011
- Preceded by: Denis Rocan
- Succeeded by: riding dissolved

Personal details
- Party: Progressive Conservative

Blaine Pedersen is a politician in Manitoba, Canada. He was elected to the Legislative Assembly of Manitoba in the 2007 provincial election for the electoral division of Carman. Pederson is a member of the Progressive Conservative Party.

Pedersen was re-elected in the new Midland riding in the 2011, and 2016 elections. On May 3, 2016, Pedersen was appointed to the Executive Council of Manitoba as Minister of Infrastructure.

On August 17, 2017, he was named Minister of Growth, Enterprise and Trade.

Re-elected in the 2019 election, he announced on July 15, 2021, that he was resigning from cabinet and did not intend to seek re-election.

== Electoral record ==
2019 Manitoba general election: Midland
Party	Candidate	Votes	%	±%	Expenditures
Progressive Conservative	Blaine Pedersen	6,706	75.01	-3.4	$9,704.94
New Democratic	Cindy Friesen	1,372	15.35	+7.5	$150.00
Liberal	Julia Sisler	862	9.64	+0.3	$0.00
Total valid votes		8,940	98.85	–	
Rejected		104	1.15		
Turnout		9,044	59.27		
Eligible voters		15,258			
Progressive Conservative hold		Swing		-5.5	
Source(s) Source: Manitoba. Chief Electoral Officer (2019). Statement of Votes for the 42nd Provincial General Election, September 10, 2019 (PDF) (Report). Winnipeg: Elections Manitoba. "Candidate Election Returns". Elections Manitoba. Elections Manitoba.

2016 Manitoba general election: Midland
Party	Candidate	Votes	%	±%	Expenditures
Progressive Conservative	Blaine Pedersen	6,168	75.20	5.76	$6,787.89
Green	Stacy O'Neill	797	9.72	–	$165.77
New Democratic	Jacqueline Theroux	714	8.71	-14.94	$648.86
Liberal	Julia Sisler	523	6.38	-0.53	$2.92
Total valid votes		8,202	–	–	
Rejected		64	–		
Eligible voters / turnout		13,857	59.65	8.30	
Source(s) Source: Manitoba. Chief Electoral Officer (2016). Statement of Votes for the 41st Provincial General Election, April 19, 2016 (PDF) (Report). Winnipeg: Elections Manitoba. "Election Returns: 41st General Election". Elections Manitoba. 2016.

2011 Manitoba general election: Midland
Party	Candidate	Votes	%	Expenditures
Progressive Conservative	Blaine Pedersen	5,139	69.45	$21,702.82
New Democratic	Jacqueline Theroux	1,750	23.65	$3,063.12
Liberal	Leah Jeffers	511	6.91	$2,572.41
Total valid votes		7,400	–	
Rejected		29	–	
Eligible voters / turnout		14,467	51.35	
Source(s) Source: Manitoba. Chief Electoral Officer (2011). Statement of Votes for the 40th Provincial General Election, October 4, 2011 (PDF) (Report). Winnipeg: Elections Manitoba. "Election Returns: 40th General Election". Elections Manitoba. 2011.

2007 Manitoba general election: Carman
Party	Candidate	Votes	%	±%	Expenditures
Progressive Conservative	Blaine Pedersen	3,845	57.96	+6.10	$10,079.39
New Democratic	Sharon Sadowy	1,440	21.71	+0.44	$2,970.97
Liberal	Don Oldcorn	1,293	19.49	−7.38	$5,572.63
Total valid votes		6,578	99.16		
Rejected and declined ballots		56			
Turnout		6,634	53.19	−0.95	
Electors on the lists		12,471			
