= Robert Pow =

Canadian politician and sportsman

Olympic medal record

Men's Curling
Gold medal – first place	1932 Lake Placid	Curling (demonstration)

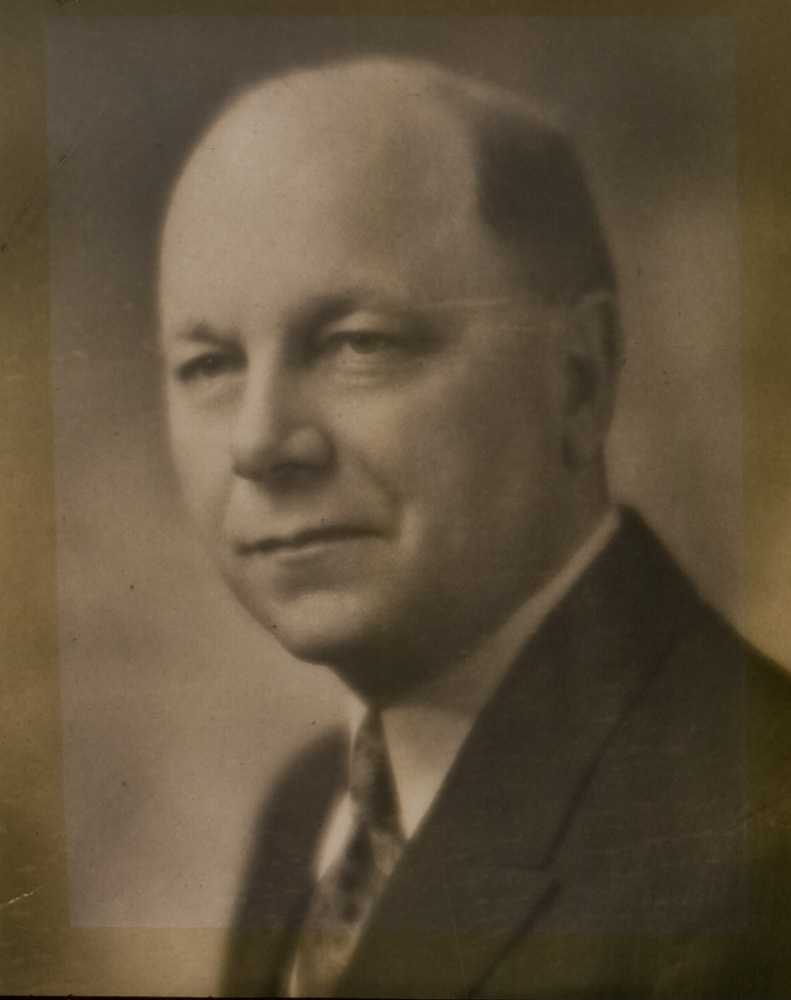
Pow in 1933

Robert Barclay "Bart" Pow (July 7, 1883 – April 25, 1958) was a politician in Ontario, Canada. He served as mayor of Fort William from 1933 to 1936.

He was born in Emerson, Manitoba and was educated in Manitoba. He began work at the Northern Elevator Company in Emerson and moved to Fort William in 1908, continuing to work with grain elevator companies. He was promoted to superintendent, then manager and finally director.

Pow was named to the team that represented the Manitoba Curling Association at the 1932 Winter Olympics. That year, curling was a demonstration sport. Pow was second for the team which took first place in the event. The Manitoba team was undefeated, winning all four of its games at the Olympics. In 2004, the team was inducted into the Manitoba Sports Hall of Fame.

Pow served six years on the Fort William public school board. He was a member of Fort William council from 1929 to 1932 and 1937 to 1940. He ran for mayor again in 1941, losing to Chisholm Mackenzie Ross. During his term as mayor, a white cross was erected on Mount McKay to commemorate the contribution of First Nations soldiers during World War I. Pow also convinced the Ontario Municipal Board to reverse their decision to not allow an airport in Fort William. In 1945, he ran unsuccessfully for the Fort William seat in the Canadian House of Commons as a Conservative, finishing third behind Dan McIvor and Wilfred McKenzie. Pow also served as president of the Fort William Conservative Party Association.

He died in Fort William at the age of 74.
