= Frederick Laurence Schaffner =

Canadian politician

The Honourable Frederick Laurence Schaffner

Member of Parliament for Souris
- In office 1904–1917
- Succeeded by: Albert Ernest Finley

Canadian Senator from Manitoba
- In office October 23, 1917 – May 22, 1935
- Appointed by: Robert Laird Borden

Personal details
- Born: August 18, 1855 Williamstown, Nova Scotia, Canada
- Died: May 22, 1935 (aged 79)
- Party: Conservative
- Education: Acadia University (BA); Trinity College, Toronto (MD)

Frederick Laurence Schaffner (August 18, 1855 – May 22, 1935) was a Canadian physician and politician.

== Early life and education ==
Born in Williamstown, Nova Scotia, the son of William C. Schaffner and A. Schaffner, his father of German and his mother of English descent, Schaffner was received a B.A. degree from Acadia University and a M.D., C.M. degree from Trinity College in Toronto. He was a member of the Manitoba Board of Health, a coroner, and Health Officer of the municipalities of Morton and Boissevain. He was a city councillor and Mayor of Boissevain, Manitoba.

== Political career ==
Schaffner was elected to the House of Commons of Canada for the Manitoba electoral district of Souris in the 1904 federal election. A Conservative, he was re-elected in 1908 and 1911. During World War I, he was a medical officer in the Royal Canadian Army Medical Corps. In 1917, he was summoned to the Senate of Canada on the advice of Robert Laird Borden representing the senatorial division of Souris, Manitoba. He served until his death in 1935.
