= Midland (electoral district) =

Provincial electoral district in Manitoba, Canada

Coordinates: 49.591°N 98.928°W

Manitoba electoral district

Provincial electoral district
- Legislature: Legislative Assembly of Manitoba
MLA
Lauren Stone
Progressive Conservative
- District created: 2008
- First contested: 2011
- Last contested: 2023

Demographics
- Population (2016): 22,895
- Electors (2019): 15,259
- Area (km²): 5,119
- Pop. density (per km²): 4.5

Midland is a provincial electoral district of Manitoba, Canada. It was created by redistribution in 2008. The riding is centred on the community of Carman. Following the 2018 redistribution, the riding also began to include the town of Morris. It also includes the communities of St. Claude, La Salle, Elm Creek, and Starbuck.

== Members of the Legislative Assembly ==
Assembly	Years	Member	Party
Riding created from Pembina, Carman and Turtle Mountain
40th	2011-2016	Blaine Pedersen	Progressive Conservative
41st	2016–2019	Blaine Pedersen	Progressive Conservative
42nd	2019–2023	Blaine Pedersen	Progressive Conservative
43rd	2023–present	Lauren Stone	Progressive Conservative

== Election results ==
=== 2023 ===
2023 Manitoba general election
Party	Candidate	Votes	%	±%	Expenditures
Progressive Conservative	Lauren Stone	6,227	69.38	-5.63	$14,037.10
New Democratic	Hannah Drudge	2,011	22.41	+7.06	$168.00
Liberal	Jim Kane	737	8.21	-1.43	$0.00
Total valid votes/expense limit		8,975	99.17	–	$62,053.00
Total rejected and declined ballots		75	0.83	–	
Turnout		9,050	56.95	-2.33	
Eligible voters		15,892			
Progressive Conservative hold		Swing		-6.34	
Source(s) Source: Elections Manitoba

=== 2019 ===
2019 Manitoba general election
Party	Candidate	Votes	%	±%	Expenditures
Progressive Conservative	Blaine Pedersen	6,706	75.01	-3.4	$9,704.94
New Democratic	Cindy Friesen	1,372	15.35	+7.5	$150.00
Liberal	Julia Sisler	862	9.64	+0.3	$0.00
Total valid votes		8,940	98.85	–	
Rejected		104	1.15		
Turnout		9,044	59.27		
Eligible voters		15,258			
Progressive Conservative hold		Swing		-5.5	
Source(s) Source: Manitoba. Chief Electoral Officer (2019). Statement of Votes for the 42nd Provincial General Election, September 10, 2019 (PDF) (Report). Winnipeg: Elections Manitoba. "Candidate Election Returns". Elections Manitoba. Elections Manitoba.

=== 2016 ===
2016 provincial election redistributed results
Party	%
Progressive Conservative	78.4
Liberal	9.3
New Democratic	7.8
Green	4.5

2016 Manitoba general election
Party	Candidate	Votes	%	±%	Expenditures
Progressive Conservative	Blaine Pedersen	6,168	75.20	5.76	$6,787.89
Green	Stacy O'Neill	797	9.72	–	$165.77
New Democratic	Jacqueline Theroux	714	8.71	-14.94	$648.86
Liberal	Julia Sisler	523	6.38	-0.53	$2.92
Total valid votes		8,202	–	–	
Rejected		64	–		
Eligible voters / turnout		13,857	59.65	8.30	
Source(s) Source: Manitoba. Chief Electoral Officer (2016). Statement of Votes for the 41st Provincial General Election, April 19, 2016 (PDF) (Report). Winnipeg: Elections Manitoba. "Election Returns: 41st General Election". Elections Manitoba. 2016.

=== 2011 ===
2011 Manitoba general election
Party	Candidate	Votes	%	Expenditures
Progressive Conservative	Blaine Pedersen	5,139	69.45	$21,702.82
New Democratic	Jacqueline Theroux	1,750	23.65	$3,063.12
Liberal	Leah Jeffers	511	6.91	$2,572.41
Total valid votes		7,400	–	
Rejected		29	–	
Eligible voters / turnout		14,467	51.35	
Source(s) Source: Manitoba. Chief Electoral Officer (2011). Statement of Votes for the 40th Provincial General Election, October 4, 2011 (PDF) (Report). Winnipeg: Elections Manitoba. "Election Returns: 40th General Election". Elections Manitoba. 2011.

== See also ==
- List of Manitoba provincial electoral districts
- Canadian provincial electoral districts
