= James Steedsman =

Canadian politician

James Steedsman (January 24, 1864 – March 16, 1959) was a Manitoba farmer who was elected to the House of Commons of Canada as a member of the agrarian Progressive Party of Canada.

He was born in Molesworth, Canada West and schooled in Oxford County, Ontario. In 1882, he moved to Deloraine, Manitoba where he became a farmer.

He became involved in the farmers' movement and served as vice-president of the Manitoba Farmers Mutual Hail Insurance Company, and Director of the Deloraine Milling Company.

Steedsman was first elected from Souris to the House of Commons in the 1921 federal election in which the Progressives made their breakthrough; defeating Manitoba Conservative Party leader Richard Gardiner Willis. He was re-elected in the 1925 federal election and again in 1926 before being defeated in the 1930 federal election.
