= Brian Ransom (politician) =

Canadian politician (1940–2020)

Brian Ransom (June 6, 1940–February 26, 2020) was a Canadian provincial politician in Manitoba. In 1983, he unsuccessfully ran for the leadership of the Progressive Conservative Party of Manitoba.

Ransom was born in Boissevain, Manitoba, and was educated at the University of Manitoba and the University of Alberta. He worked as a resource manager and farmer before entering public life.

He was elected to the Legislative Assembly of Manitoba in 1977, representing the rural riding of Souris-Killarney. In that year, Sterling Lyon's Progressive Conservatives won an upset victory over Edward Schreyer's New Democrats. Following the election, Ransom was appointed Minister of Mines, Resources and Environment. Following a reorganization of cabinet in 1979, he became Minister of Natural Resources and Chairman of the Treasury Board. In January 1981, he was promoted to Minister of Finance.

Ransom did not serve long in this position, as Lyon's government fell to the NDP under Howard Pawley at another election later in the year. Ransom was easily re-elected in the riding of Turtle Mountain, defeating New Democrat Joan Johannson by 3,115 votes. He ran for the party's leadership in 1983 as a representative of the party's rural/conservative wing, but on the second ballot lost to Gary Filmon, who was then regarded as a progressive. Subsequently, supporters of Ransom would allege that the Filmon camp encouraged third-place candidate Clayton Manness to run as a means of splitting the conservative vote.

Ransom did not seek re-election in the 1986 Manitoba general election. He subsequently became chairman of the Manitoba Hydro-Electric Board, and worked as a consultant in sustainable development.
