= James Peterkin Alexander =

Canadian politician (1835–1912)

- Born: June 27, 1835; Edinburgh, Scotland
- Died: April 16, 1912 (aged 76)
- Education: University of Edinburgh
- Occupation(s): merchant, farmer, political figure
- Known for: Manitoba figure
- Spouse: Margaret Crawford (m.1872)

James Peterkin Alexander (June 27, 1835 – April 16, 1912) was a Scottish-born farmer and political figure in Manitoba. He represented Turtle Mountain from 1881 to 1883 and Souris from 1886 to 1888 in the Legislative Assembly of Manitoba as a Conservative.

== Biography ==
Alexander was born on June 27, 1835, in Edinburgh, Scotland, to William Alexander, and was educated at the normal school and the University of Edinburgh. In 1872, he married Margaret Crawford. Alexander was a Glasgow merchant until 1878 when he was forced out of business by the failure of the City of Glasgow Bank. In November 1879, he emigrated to the Turtle Mountain area of southern Manitoba. Alexander was defeated when he ran for reelection in 1883. He was a magistrate and coroner for the province and served as registrar of deeds for Souris County from 1883 to 1886. He later was editor of the Deloraine Advertiser and registrar for the Boissevain land title office.

Alexander died April 16, 1912, aged 76, in a barber's chair of a heart attack after hearing of his friend John Hugo Ross's death on the Titanic.
