= Edward Dow =

Canadian politician (1904–1992)

Personal details
- Born: September 13, 1904 Pilot Mound, Manitoba, Canada
- Died: December 13, 1992 (aged 88) Killarney, Manitoba, Canada
- Party: Liberal

Edward Ingo Dow (September 13, 1904 – December 23, 1992) was a politician in Manitoba, Canada. He served as a Liberal member of the Legislative Assembly of Manitoba from 1959 to 1962, from 1966 to 1968, and from 1968 to 1969.

The son of George Dow and Eleanor Mary Ingo, he was born in Pilot Mound, Manitoba. Dow moved with his family to British Columbia, later moving to Boissevain, Manitoba in 1915, where he became a prominent businessman in the community. Along with his father, he operated George Dow and Sons Mill, and later the Cockshutt farm implement business. In 1927, he married Dorothy Grace Taylor. Edward Dow served as mayor of Boissevain from 1946 to 1968.

He ran for the House of Commons of Canada in the 1949 federal election as a candidate of the Liberal Party of Canada, but lost to Progressive Conservative J. Arthur Ross by 613 votes. He was expected to campaign for Brandon—Souris in the 1953 federal election, but unexpectedly declined the nomination.

Dow ran for the Manitoba legislature in the 1958 provincial election, but lost to Progressive Conservative incumbent Errick French Willis by over 1,000 votes in the southern riding of Turtle Mountain. He did not run in the 1959 election, but took the Turtle Mountain seat in a by-election on November 26, 1959, following Willis's resignation to accept the office of Lieutenant Governor. This by-election occurred at a time when the Progressive Conservative Party was dominant both federally and provincially, and Dow was only able to defeat his PC opponent Robert Cawston Aitkens by 106 votes.

The Progressive Conservative Party won a second consecutive majority government in the 1962 provincial election, and Dow lost to PC candidate Peter I. McDonald by over 800 votes. He recovered the seat in the 1966 election, however, defeating McDonald by only five votes out of about 5,000 cast.

These results were later overturned, and the seat was declared vacant on January 30, 1968. On March 4, Dow narrowly defeated PC challenger Allan Rose to capture the seat a third time. His return to office was short-lived, however. The Liberals lost much of their rural support base in the 1969 provincial election, and Dow lost his seat to PC candidate Earl McKellar by over 1,000 votes in the redistributed riding of Souris—Killarney.

He died in Killarney at the age of 88.
