= Curling at the 1932 Winter Olympics =

Curling at the III Olympic Winter Games
- Venue: Olympic Indoor Arena, Lake Placid, New York
- Dates: February 4−5, 1932

Medalists
1st place, gold medalist(s)		Manitoba	Canada
2nd place, silver medalist(s)		Ontario	Canada
3rd place, bronze medalist(s)		Quebec	Canada

Curling was a demonstration sport at the 1932 Winter Olympics. The curling venue was the Olympic Indoor Arena in Lake Placid, New York. Eight teams from two countries (4 American teams and 4 Canadian Teams) competed in this event. The 16-end matches were held on February 4 and 5, 1932. Each of the Canadian teams played against each of the American teams.

== Event summary ==
Games	Gold	Silver	Bronze
Men's	Canada - Manitoba; William H. Burns; James L. Bowman; Robert B. Pow; Errick F. Willis	Canada - Ontario; E.F. George; Frank P. McDonald; Archibald Lockhart; Russell G. Hall	Canada - Quebec; William Brown; T. Howard Stewart; John Leonard; Albert Maclaren

The medalists were from the Canadian provinces of Manitoba, Ontario, and Quebec. The highest placed American team was from Connecticut in 4th place. The other American teams were from New York, Michigan and Massachusetts.

=== Teams ===
Teams representing Canada:

Canada - Manitoba	Canada - Northern Ontario	Canada - Ontario	Canada - Quebec
Skip: William H. Burns; Third: James L. Bowman; Second: Robert B. Pow; Lead: Errick F. Willis	Skip: E.F. George; Third: Peter Lyall; Second: John Walker; Lead: W. W. Thompson	Skip: Harvey J. Sims; Third: Frank P. McDonald; Second: Archibald Lockhart; Lead: Russell G. Hall	Skip: William Brown; Third: T. Howard Stewart; Second: John Leonard; Lead: Albert Maclaren

Teams representing the United States:

United States - Connecticut	United States - Massachusetts	United States - Michigan	United States - New York
Skip: A. R. Hatfield; Third: S. S. Curran; Second: Robert Pryde; Lead: H. E. Burt	Skip: A. S. Porter; Third: Charles Curtis; Second: George Willett; Lead: F. R. Parks	Skip: George M. Lawton; Third: Don Fraser; Second: E. R. Palmer; Lead: W. H. Mormley	Skip: J. W. Calder; Third: G. B. Ogden; Second: F. D. Peale; Lead: C. B. Williams

=== Standings ===
Place	Team	Wins	Losses	PF	PA
1	Manitoba	4	0	71	45
2	Ontario	3	1	74	36
3	Quebec	3	1	57	46
4	Connecticut	2	2	58	55
5	Northern Ontario	2	2	61	56
6	Massachusetts	1	3	38	77
7	New York	1	3	51	54
8	Michigan	0	4	36	77

=== Draw 1 ===
Afternoon, February 4

Team	Final
New York	20
Northern Ontario	8

Team	Final
Quebec	14
Connecticut	12

Team	Final
Ontario	21
Michigan	7

Team	Final
Manitoba	19
Massachusetts	10

=== Draw 2 ===
Evening, February 4

Team	Final
Quebec	13
New York	11

Team	Final
Connecticut	18
Northern Ontario	13

Team	Final
Ontario	22
Massachusetts	4

Team	Final
Manitoba	22
Michigan	12

=== Draw 3 ===
Morning, February 5

Team	Final
Northern Ontario	21
Massachusetts	7

Team	Final
Manitoba	15
Connecticut	14

Team	Final
Ontario	18
New York	11

Team	Final
Quebec	15
Michigan	6

=== Draw 4 ===
Afternoon, February 5

Team	Final
Connecticut (extra end)	14
Ontario	13

Team	Final
Massachusetts	17
Quebec	15

Team	Final
Northern Ontario	19
Michigan	11

Team	Final
Manitoba	15
New York	9
