= Archibald McIntyre Campbell =

Canadian politician

Archibald McIntyre Campbell (July 30, 1851 – December 3, 1935) was a farmer and political figure in Manitoba. He represented Souris from 1888 to 1899 in the Legislative Assembly of Manitoba as a Liberal.

He was born in Glengarry County, Ontario, the son of Walter W. Campbell. Campbell lived in Stratford, Ontario from 1870 to 1883 before coming to Manitoba. In 1873, Campbell married Fanny Foster. In 1888, he was living in Melita, Manitoba. He was defeated when he ran for reelection to the provincial assembly in 1899. Campbell ran unsuccessfully for the Souris seat in the Canadian House of Commons in 1908 and in 1911. He died in North Dakota in 1935.
