= Lauren Stone =

Canadian politician

Lauren Stone MLA

Member of the Legislative Assembly of Manitoba for Midland
- Incumbent
- Assumed office October 3, 2023
- Preceded by: Blaine Pedersen

Personal details
- Born: 1987 (age 38–39)
- Party: Progressive Conservative
- Education: Queen's University (BA Hons)

Lauren Stone (born 1987) is a Canadian politician, who was elected as a member of the Legislative Assembly (MLA) of Manitoba in the 2023 Manitoba general election. She represents the district of Midland as a member of the Manitoba Progressive Conservative Party.

== Education and career ==
Stone is a graduate of Queen's University.

Professionally, she worked in agri-business and manufacturing.

On October 1, 2024, she was appointed as Shadow Minister of Finance and Manitoba Hydro.

Shortly after her election in 2023, she was appointed as the Shadow Minister for Families, Accessibility, and Gender Equity.

== Personal life ==
Stone and her husband have two children. They live in La Salle, Manitoba.

== Electoral record ==
2023 Manitoba general election: Midland
Party	Candidate	Votes	%	±%	Expenditures
Progressive Conservative	Lauren Stone	6,227	69.38	-5.63	$14,037.10
New Democratic	Hannah Drudge	2,011	22.41	+7.06	$168.00
Liberal	Jim Kane	737	8.21	-1.43	$0.00
Total valid votes/expense limit		8,975	99.17	–	$62,053.00
Total rejected and declined ballots		75	0.83	–	
Turnout		9,050	56.95	-2.33	
Eligible voters		15,892			
Progressive Conservative hold		Swing		-6.34	
Source(s) Source: Elections Manitoba
