= Richard Gardiner Willis =

Canadian politician (1865-1929)

Richard Gardiner Willis (February 10, 1865 – 8 February 1929) was a politician in Manitoba, Canada. He was the leader of the Manitoba Conservative Party from 1919 to 1922, and served in the Legislative Assembly of Manitoba from 1922 until his death.

Born in Lombardy, Canada West, Willis was educated at Smiths Falls High School and the University of Toronto. He later moved to Manitoba, and worked as a farmer. In 1891, he married Ella French. Willis was reeve of the Rural Municipality of Morton and mayor of Boissevain. In 1915, he co-nominated James Albert Manning Aikins to become the new leader of the provincial Conservative Party.

Despite having little political experience, Willis was chosen leader of the Manitoba Conservatives on November 6, 1919, defeating future leader Major Fawcett Taylor. His victory was considered an upset, and can probably be credited to the increasingly strong presence of organized farmers in Manitoba. Some believe Conservative delegates were influenced by the recent election of Ernest Drury's United Farmers in Ontario.

The Conservative Party had governed Manitoba from 1900 to 1915, but was sidelined by the emergence of farmer and labour radicalism in the late 1910s. It emerged as the fourth-largest parliamentary group in the 1920 election, behind the Liberals, Farmer candidates and Labour. Willis sought election in Turtle Mountain, but lost to incumbent Liberal George McDonald by 14 votes.

He technically retained the leadership of the Manitoba Conservative Party until April 1922, but did not play a significant role in the party after his defeat. John Thomas Haig served as the party's leader in the legislature in 1921–22.

Willis ran as the federal Conservative candidate in Souris for the federal election of 1921, but placed a poor second in a two-way race. He stepped down as provincial Conservative leader just before the 1922 provincial election, and was replaced by Taylor.

Ironically, Willis's personal electoral fortunes improved after his resignation as leader. He was elected for Turtle Mountain in the 1922 provincial election, and was re-elected in 1927. Both elections were won by the United Farmers of Manitoba, and Willis sat with the Conservatives in opposition. He was still a member of the legislature when he died in Winnipeg in February 1929.

His son, Errick Willis, served as leader of the Manitoba Conservative Party from 1936 to 1954.
