= Merv Tweed =

Canadian politician

Mervin C. Tweed

Member of Parliament for Brandon—Souris
- In office June 28, 2004 – August 31, 2013
- Preceded by: Rick Borotsik
- Succeeded by: Larry Maguire

Member of the Legislative Assembly of Manitoba for Turtle Mountain
- In office April 25, 1995 – May 25, 2004
- Preceded by: Bob Rose
- Succeeded by: Cliff Cullen

Chair of the Standing Committee on Agriculture
- In office 25 September 2012 – 23 October 2013
- Minister: Gerry Ritz
- Preceded by: Larry Miller
- Succeeded by: Bev Shipley

Mayor of the Rural Municipality of Killarney-Turtle Mountain
- In office June 23, 2021 – October 26, 2022
- Preceded by: Rick Pauls
- Succeeded by: Janice Smith

Personal details
- Born: August 6, 1955 (age 71) Medora, Manitoba, Canada
- Party: Conservative
- Profession: Automobile dealer

Mervin C. Tweed (born August 6, 1955) is a retired politician in Manitoba, Canada. He represented Brandon—Souris in the House of Commons of Canada from 2004 to August 31, 2013. Prior to that he was a member of the Legislative Assembly of Manitoba from 1995 to 2004, representing the constituency of Turtle Mountain. He was the president of Omnitrax, the American rail company that was responsible for the Churchill rail line. After letting the rail line fall into disrepair and ignoring Federal orders to repair it, the American owners sold it to the Federal Government of Canada who then transferred it to a consortium of First Nations. The rebranded Arctic Gateway has since been revitalized and operates to this day after the neglect it went through under American management.

== Background ==
Tweed was born in Medora, Manitoba, and was educated at Brandon University. He operated a used car dealership for seventeen years, and was for a time an executive member of the Killarney and Area Recreation Committee.

== Municipal politician ==
Tweed began his political career in municipal politics, serving as a councillor in the rural municipality of Brenda for five years, and as deputy reeve for three. Tweed returned to municipal politics in 2021 after being elected mayor of the Municipality of Killarney-Turtle Mountain.

In 2026 Tweed registered his campaign to run for Mayor of the RM of Killarney-Turtle Mountain after not seeking re-election in 2022.

== Provincial politician (1995–2004) ==
In 1995, he was elected to the Manitoba legislature as a Progressive Conservative in Turtle Mountain, a safe seat for the party. He served as a parliamentary assistant to a variety of ministers in the government of Premier Gary Filmon before being appointed Minister of Industry, Trade and Tourism with responsibility for the Development Corporation Act on February 5, 1999.

Tweed was easily re-elected in the 1999 provincial election, although the Progressive Conservatives were defeated at the provincial level by the New Democratic Party under Gary Doer. Tweed resigned his cabinet portfolio with the rest of the Filmon ministry.

Despite the NDP's landmark election win of 2003, Tweed was again re-elected in Turtle Mountain without difficulty, receiving 3,956 votes against 1,893 for New Democrat Lonnie Patterson.

== Federal politician (2004–2013) ==
When federal Conservative MP Rick Borotsik (Brandon—Souris), announced his retirement in 2004, Tweed resigned his provincial seat and won the Conservative nomination for the riding. He received 18,209 votes in the general election, against 8,522 for Liberal Murray Downing.

Following the 2004 election, Tweed was named opposition critic for Western Economic Diversification by Conservative leader Stephen Harper. In April 2006, Tweed was elected chairperson of House of Commons of Canada's Standing Committee on Transport, Infrastructure and Communities, a post he held until September 25, 2012 when he was elected chairperson of the Standing Committee on Agriculture and Agri-food. His resignation took effect on August 31, 2013. Tweed went on to work as President of OmniTRAX Canada, which operates, amongst others, the Port of Churchill.

== Electoral record ==
2011 Canadian federal election: Brandon—Souris
Party	Candidate	Votes	%	±%	Expenditures
Conservative	Merv Tweed	22,386	63.73	+6.67	$42,483
New Democratic	Jean Luc Bouché	8,845	25.18	+7.52	$11,846
Green	Dave Barnes	2,012	5.73	-10.06	$10,620
Liberal	Wes Penner	1,882	5.36	-2.92	$15,300
Total valid votes/expense limit		35,125	100.0		$ 88,412.19
Total rejected ballots		139	0.39	+0.07	
Turnout		35,264	57.54	+1.58	
Eligible voters		61,289	–	–	
Conservative hold		Swing		-0.42	

2008 Canadian federal election: Brandon—Souris
Party	Candidate	Votes	%	±%	Expenditures
Conservative	Merv Tweed	19,558	57.06	+2.63	$40,902
New Democratic	Jean Luc Bouché	6,055	17.67	-2.57	$16,762
Green	Dave Barnes	5,410	15.78	+11.20	$39,823
Liberal	Martha Jo Willard	2,836	8.27	-9.73	$12,178
Christian Heritage	Jerome Dondo	292	0.85	+0.07	$728
Communist	Lisa Gallagher	124	0.36	+0.04	$622
Total valid votes/expense limit		34,275	100.0		$ 85,829
Total rejected ballots		112	0.33	-0.04	
Turnout		34,387	55.96	-4.36	
Eligible voters		61,449	–	–	
Conservative hold		Swing		+2.60	

2006 Canadian federal election: Brandon—Souris
Party	Candidate	Votes	%	±%	Expenditures
Conservative	(x)Merv Tweed	20,247	54.43	+2.70	$51,606
New Democratic	Bob Senff	7,528	20.24	+1.09	$7,255
Liberal	Murray Downing	6,696	18.00	-6.21	$20,605
Green	Brad Bird	1,707	4.59	+1.00	$15.50
Independent	Mike Volek	611	1.64	–	$4,238
Christian Heritage	Colin Atkins	290	0.78	-0.22	$1,380
Communist	Lisa Gallagher	120	0.32	-0.01	$295
Total valid votes/expense limit		37,119	100.0		–
Total rejected ballots		138	0.37	-0.18	
Turnout		37,337	60.32	+4.07	
Eligible voters		61,903	–	–	
Conservative hold		Swing		+0.81	

2004 Canadian federal election: Brandon—Souris
Party	Candidate	Votes	%	±%	Expenditures
Conservative	Merv Tweed	18,209	51.72	-17.64	$54,647
Liberal	Murray Downing	8,522	24.21	+6.83	$26,903
New Democratic	Mike Abbey	6,740	19.15	+7.05	$13,512
Green	David Kattenburg	1,264	3.59	–	$1,322
Christian Heritage	Colin Atkins	351	1.00		$683
Communist	Lisa Gallagher	118	0.34		$665
Total valid votes		35,204	100.0		–
Total rejected ballots		194	0.55		
Turnout		35,398	56.24	-8.96	
Eligible voters		62,938	–	–	
Conservative notional hold		Swing		+12.23	
