= Bob Rose (Western Manitoba politician) =

Canadian politician

Member of the Legislative Assembly of Manitoba for Turtle Mountain
- In office September 11, 1990 – April 25, 1995
- Preceded by: Denis Rocan
- Succeeded by: Merv Tweed

Personal details
- Born: David Robert Rose; August 9, 1933 Medora, Manitoba
- Died: January 7, 2000 (aged 66) Souris, Manitoba

David Robert "Bob" Rose (August 9, 1933, in Bunclody, near Souris, Manitoba – January 7, 2000) was a Canadian politician in Manitoba. He was a member of the Legislative Assembly of Manitoba from 1990 to 1995 representing the rural riding of Turtle Mountain for the Progressive Conservative Party.

The son of David Francis Rose and Mary Cummings Gordon, Rose was educated at the University of Manitoba in the Faculty of Agriculture, and worked as a farmer as well as distributing seed in Canada and the United States. He was a school trustee on the Bunclody School Board, and spent 17 years as a representative to the Souris Valley School Division. He also served six terms on the Manitoba Association of School Trustees and was president of this organization in 1982–83. In 1956, he married Lois Marie Miles.

Rose was elected to the legislature in the 1990 provincial election, defeating Liberal Doug Collins by about 2700 votes. He was not appointed to Premier Gary Filmon's Cabinet, and announced his retirement from the legislature in 1995, at age 61. During his time in the assembly, he was a supporter of balanced-budget legislation.

In 1999, he was commissioned by the Manitoba government to undertake a study of recent flood damage in southwestern Manitoba. He died in Souris in 2000.
