= Carman (electoral district) =

Defunct provincial electoral district in Manitoba, Canada

Coordinates: 49.506°N 97.993°W

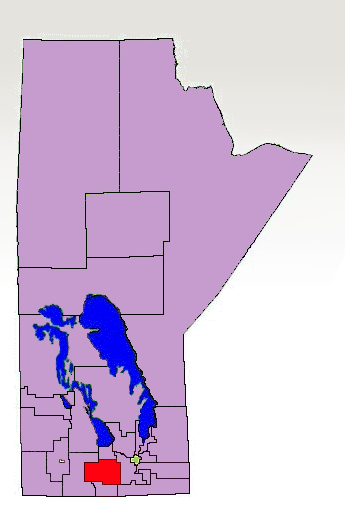
The boundaries of Carman in 2007 highlighted in red

Carman was a provincial electoral district of Manitoba, Canada. It was created by redistribution in 1999, with territory from Lakeside, Morris, and the now-defunct riding of Gladstone.

Carman was located in the southern region of Manitoba. It was bordered to the north by Portage la Prairie, to the west by Turtle Mountain, to the east by Morris, and to the south by Pembina and Emerson.

The riding was mostly rural. It included the communities of Carman, Somerset, Treherne, St. Claude, Notre Dame de Lourdes, Miami and Elm Creek. Carman also included the Long Plain Reserve, the Dakota Reserve, the Swan Lake Reserve and the Spruce Woods Provincial Park.

The riding's population in 1996 was 18,867. In 1999, the average family income was $43,401, and the unemployment rate was 3.00%. Agriculture accounts for 38% of all industry in the riding, followed by health and social services at 9%. Sixteen per cent of Carman's residents are francophone, the fourth-highest total in the province. Twelve per cent of the population is German, and a further 7% are aboriginal.

Carman was last held by Progressive Conservative MLA Blaine Pedersen, who was elected as a Progressive Conservative.

For the 2011 election, Carman was dissolved into Portage la Prairie and the newly created riding of Midland.

== Members of the Legislative Assembly ==
Name	Party	Took office	Left office
Denis Rocan	PC	1999	2007
	Independent	2007	2007
Blaine Pedersen	PC	2007	2011

== Electoral results ==
2007 Manitoba general election
Party	Candidate	Votes	%	±%	Expenditures
Progressive Conservative	Blaine Pedersen	3,845	57.96	+6.10	$10,079.39
New Democratic	Sharon Sadowy	1,440	21.71	+0.44	$2,970.97
Liberal	Don Oldcorn	1,293	19.49	−7.38	$5,572.63
Total valid votes		6,578	99.16		
Rejected and declined ballots		56			
Turnout		6,634	53.19	−0.95	
Electors on the lists		12,471			

2003 Manitoba general election
Party	Candidate	Votes	%	±%	Expenditures
Progressive Conservative	Denis Rocan	3,523	51.86	+3.05	$21,274.32
Liberal	Don Oldcorn	1,825	26.87	−3.37	$11,694.92
New Democratic	Bill Harrison	1,445	21.27	+1.22	$3,019.50
Total valid votes		6,793	99.62		
Rejected and declined ballots		26			
Turnout		6,819	54.14	−6.33	
Electors on the lists		12,595			

1999 Manitoba general election
Party	Candidate	Votes	%	±%	Expenditures
Progressive Conservative	Denis Rocan	3,698	48.81		$30,085.86
Liberal	Raymond Le Neal	2,291	30.24	–	$10,422.27
New Democratic	Diane Beresford	1,519	20.05		$645.00
Total valid votes		7,508	99.10		
Rejected and declined ballots		68			
Turnout		7,576	60.47		
Electors on the lists		12,528			

== See also ==
- List of Manitoba provincial electoral districts
- Canadian provincial electoral districts
