= J. Arthur Ross =

Canadian politician (1893–1958)

James Arthur Ross

Member of the Canadian Parliament for Souris
- In office 1940–1952
- Preceded by: George William McDonald
- Succeeded by: Constituency merged

Personal details
- Born: 8 December 1893; Lyleton, Manitoba, Canada
- Died: 1 April 1958 (aged 64); Melita, Manitoba, Canada
- Political party: Progressive Conservative Party of Manitoba

James Arthur Ross (8 December 1893 – 1 April 1958) was a Manitoba politician. He served in the House of Commons of Canada for thirteen years, and was a candidate for the leadership of the Progressive Conservative Party of Manitoba in 1953.

Ross was born in Lyleton, Manitoba, the son of John Alexander Ross and Jessie Mary Sellar, and was educated in Melita and at the Manitoba Agricultural College. He enlisted as a soldier in World War I, served in France, and was promoted to the rank of lieutenant-colonel. After the war, he worked as a farmer and served as reeve of Arthur municipality for twelve years. He was also an active Freemason. In 1930, Ross married Hilda Morrison.

Ross ran as a candidate of the Manitoba Conservative Party in the southwestern riding of Arthur for the provincial elections of 1927, 1932 and 1936. He was defeated on all three occasions by candidates of the governing Progressive Party (known after 1932 as the Liberal-Progressive Party).

In 1940, Ross was elected to the House of Commons of Canada for the riding of Souris, narrowly defeating Liberal candidate George William McDonald. He was re-elected by a wider margin in 1945, and once again by a narrow margin in 1949. He remained an MP until 1953, serving for the entire time in the opposition Progressive Conservative caucus. Ross retired from federal politics in 1953, after his riding was eliminated by redistribution.

Ross returned to provincial politics for the 1953 provincial election, and was elected for Arthur on his fourth attempt. He defeated John R. Pitt, who had also been his opponent in 1936.

The Conservatives had been led since 1936 by Errick Willis, a figure from the party's rural base who was a prominent cabinet minister in the coalition years. Willis had been an ineffective campaigner in the 1953 election, and many Conservatives (including Ross) believed that new leadership would be needed for an electoral breakthrough. In October 1953, Willis bowed to internal pressure and called a leadership convention for the following year. Willis announced that he would stand for re-election; Ross and Dufferin Roblin also declared themselves as candidates.

Ross was unskilled at province-wide campaigning, and was unable to develop an organization comparable with those of Willis and Roblin. He was also damaged by reports that he and other MLAs were preparing to start a new party if Willis was re-elected.

Ross finished third on the first ballot, with 55 votes. Most of his supporters went to Roblin, who won on the second ballot.

Ross died in Melita just before the election of 1958.
