= David Watmough =

Canadian writer (1926–2017)

David Arthur Watmough (August 17, 1926 – August 4, 2017) was a Canadian playwright, short story writer and novelist.

Watmough was born in London, England, and attended King's College London. He has worked as a reporter (the Cornish Guardian, a 'Talks Producer' (BBC Third Programme) and an editor (Ace Books). He immigrated to Canada in 1960, to Kitsilano in Vancouver, British Columbia, where he lived for 40 years with his partner, ex-Californian Floyd St. Clair (1930–2009), an opera critic and, from 1963 till his retirement in 1996, a University of British Columbia French professor. He became a Canadian citizen in 1967.

Watmough lived from 2004 to 2009 in Boundary Bay and before his death had been living at Crofton Manor, a Vancouver assisted-living facility.

In 2008, he published his autobiography, Myself Through Others: Memoirs.

== Selected bibliography ==
- 1951: A Church Renascent: A Study in Modern French Catholicism, London: S.P.C.K.
- 1967: Names for the Numbered Years: Three Plays, Vancouver: Bau-Xi Gallery
- 1972: Ashes for Easter and Other Monodramas, Talonbooks
- 1975: From a Cornish Landscape, Padstow, Cornwall: Lodenk Press
- 1975: Love & The Waiting Game, Oberon
- 1978: No More Into the Garden, Doubleday
- 1982: Collected Shorter Fiction of David Watmough: 1972–82
- 1982: Unruly Skeletons
- 1984: The Connecticut Countess, Crossing Press
- 1984: Fury, Oberon
- 1986: Vibrations in Time, Mosaic
- 1988: The Year of Fears, Mosaic
- 1992: Thy Mother's Glass, Harper Collins, ISBN 978-0-00-647399-2
- 1994: The Time of the Kingfishers, Arsenal Pulp Press, ISBN 978-1-551520-08-7
- 1996: Hunting With Diana, Arsenal Pulp Press, ISBN 978-1-551520-32-2
- 2002: The Moor is Dark Beneath the Moon, Dundurn, ISBN 978-1-55488-654-8
- 2005: Vancouver Voices, Ripple Effect Press, ISBN 1-894735-09-9
- 2007: Geraldine, Ekstasis, ISBN 978-1-894800-99-0
- 2008: Coming Down the Pike: Sonnets, Ekstasis, ISBN 978-1-897430-30-9
- 2008: Myself Through Others: Memoirs, Dundurn, ISBN 978-1-55002-799-0
- 2010: Eyes and Ears on Boundary Bay, Ekstasis, ISBN 978-1-897430-45-3
- 2011: To Each an Albatross, Ekstasis, ISBN 978-1-897430-64-4
- 2013: Songs from the Hive, Ekstasis, ISBN 978-1-897430-96-5
