= Oak Bluff, Manitoba =

Oak Bluff
- Location of Oak Bluff in Manitoba
- Coordinates: 49°46′25.5″N 97°19′20.6″W
- Country: Canada
- Province: Manitoba
- Region: Winnipeg Metro; Central Plains

Area
  - Total: 2.52 km^{2} (0.97 sq mi)
- Elevation: 240 m (790 ft)

Population (2021)
  - Total: 1,442
  - Density: 572/km^{2} (1,480/sq mi)
- Time zone: UTC-6 (CST)
  - Summer (DST): UTC-5 (CDT)
- Postal Code: R0G 1N0
- Area codes: 204, 431

Oak Bluff is an incorporated community located in the Rural Municipality of Macdonald, Manitoba, Canada. It is situated seven kilometres southwest of the City of Winnipeg, between Manitoba Highway (PTH) 3's intersections with PTH 2 and PTH 100 (the Perimeter Highway). The community has a population of 1,442 as of the 2021 Canadian census

Oak Bluff overlaps the Central Plains and Winnipeg Metro Regions. It is part of the Winnipeg census metropolitan area.

== History ==
The Oak Bluff area was settled by British and Scottish settlers in the 1870s. Rail service arrived in the community in 1901 and a grain elevator was established soon after to serve the mainly agricultural area. The Perimeter Highway, which skirts the city of Winnipeg, was constructed on the east side of the community in the 1950s and greatly increased traffic through the area. From 1960 to 1972, Oak Bluff was part of a region controlled by the City of Winnipeg under the Metropolitan Winnipeg Act, which led to commercial and industrial development in the area.

Between 2011 and 2016, the community's population increased from 581 to 1,051, the second largest percentage increase (80.9%) of any community in Manitoba. It increased by 37% to 1,442 persons between 2016 and 2021.

== Demographics ==
In the 2021 Census of Population conducted by Statistics Canada, Oak Bluff had a population of 1,442 living in 475 of its 481 total private dwellings, a change of 37.2% from its 2016 population of 1,051. With a land area of 2.52 km^{2} (0.97 sq mi), it had a population density of 572.2/km^{2} (1,482.0/sq mi) in 2021.

== Education ==
Oak Bluff's first school was constructed in 1889 and later replaced with new buildings in 1913, 1930, and more recently in the 1990s. The current Oak Bluff school houses students from Kindergarten to grade eight and is part of the Red River Valley School Division (formerly the Morris-MacDonald School Division). After the eighth grade, students attend the high school in nearby Sanford.

== Sports and recreation ==
Oak Bluff's indoor arena is one of five that serve the municipality. The community does not have its own youth ice hockey teams, rather it participates in the municipality's unified minor hockey program. Oak Bluff's recreation grounds also feature baseball diamonds and soccer pitches.

Situated between Oak Bluff and Winnipeg is The Rink Training Centre (TRTC), a privately owned arena and training complex that houses the Rink Hockey Academy and a high performance ice hockey clinic.

== Notable people ==
- Leanne Taylor, paratriathlete

== See also ==
- List of communities in Manitoba by population
