= Albert Ernest Finley =

Canadian politician

Albert Ernest Finley (August 24, 1870 – October 4, 1923) was a Canadian physician and political figure in Manitoba, Canada. He represented Souris in the House of Commons of Canada from 1917 to 1921 as a Unionist member.

He was born on Amherst Island, Ontario, the son of David T. Finley and Jane Henderson, and was educated at Queen's University and the Manitoba Medical School (later the Faculty of Medicine at the University of Manitoba). Finley set up practice in Elgin, Manitoba. In 1903, he married Jettie C. Stewart. He died in Elgin at the age of 53.
