= George William McDonald =

Canadian politician (1875–1950)

George William McDonald (November 20, 1875 – April 6, 1950) was a politician in Manitoba, Canada. He served in the Legislative Assembly of Manitoba from 1915 to 1922 as a member of the Manitoba Liberal Party, and later sat in the House of Commons of Canada from 1935 to 1940 as a Liberal-Progressive.

McDonald was born in Lucknow, Ontario, the son of Donald McDonald and Mary McKenzie, and was educated in Kincardine. After completing his schooling, he taught school in Kinloss. He later moved to Manitoba, and worked as an agricultural implement dealer and insurance agent in Boissevain. In 1914, he married Jennie M. Taylor.

He first sought election to the Manitoba legislature in the 1914 campaign, but lost to Conservative incumbent James Johnson by 62 votes. In 1915, the Conservative government of Rodmond Roblin was forced to resign amid a corruption scandal. A new election was held, which the Liberals won in a landslide. McDonald was elected for Turtle Mountain, defeating Johnson by 36 votes. In the legislature, he served as a backbench supporter of Tobias Norris's government.

The Liberals were reduced to a minority government in the 1920 provincial election. McDonald faced a serious challenge in Turtle Mountain from new Conservative leader Richard G. Willis, but retained his seat by sixteen votes (1,022 to 1,006). He did not seek re-election in 1922.

He was mayor of Boissevain from 1924 to 1926 and served on the town council from 1929 to 1935.

McDonald returned to political life in the 1935 federal election, winning the rural Manitoba riding of Souris as a Liberal-Progressive by only three votes (3,504 to 3,501). Ironically, he won this election by defeating incumbent Conservative Errick French Willis, the son of Richard G. Willis. Although he was not formally a member of the Liberal Party of Canada caucus, McDonald served as a backbench supporter of William Lyon Mackenzie King's Liberal government for the next five years.

He was defeated in the 1940 campaign in which he ran as a straight Liberal, losing to "National Government" candidate J. Arthur Ross by 130 votes. He did not seek a further return to politics after this time.

McDonald died at home in Boissevain at the age of 74.
