= John Hettle =

Canadian politician

John Hettle (May 23, 1842 – September 20, 1897) was an English-born merchant and political figure in Manitoba. He represented Turtle Mountain from 1888 to 1897 in the Legislative Assembly of Manitoba as a Liberal.

He was born in Norham, Northumberland and came to Hullet Township, Huron County in Canada West with his family in 1857. Hettle later moved west, settling in Boissevain, Manitoba and going into business as an implement dealer. He served on the municipal council and was secretary-treasurer for the Turtle Mountain school board.

In 1869, Hettle married Ellen Walker. He died in office at the age of 55.
