= Killarney, Manitoba =

Killarney
- Unincorporated community
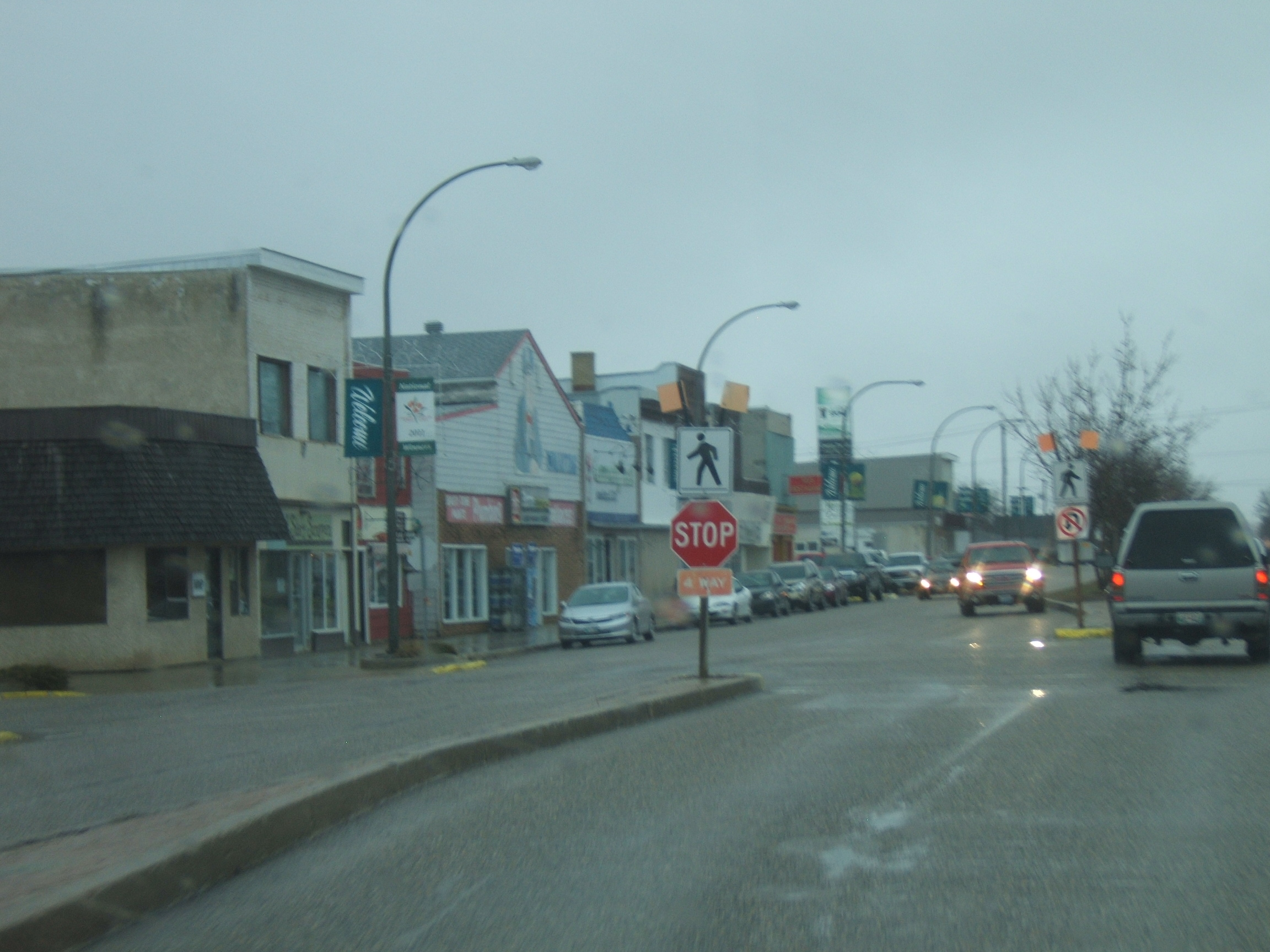
- Downtown Killarney, Manitoba

- Location within Manitoba
- Coordinates: 49°11′00″N 99°39′46″W
- Country: Canada
- Province: Manitoba
- Municipality: Killarney-Turtle Mountain
- Named for: Killarney, Ireland

Area
  - Metro: 5.10 km^{2} (1.97 sq mi)

Population (2021)
  - Unincorporated community: 2,499
  - Density: 430.9/km^{2} (1,116/sq mi)
- Time zone: UTC−5 (CST)
  - Summer (DST): UTC−6 (CDT)

Killarney is an unincorporated community in southwestern Manitoba, Canada, at the corner of Manitoba Provincial Trunk Highways 3 and 18.

The community was formerly an incorporated town before amalgamating with the surrounding Rural Municipality of Turtle Mountain to form the Municipality of Killarney-Turtle Mountain. Killarney is known for the lake situated within the community. Killarney is located in a rural area, dependent primarily on agriculture and agribusiness. It is approximately 20 km (12 mi) from the Canada-US border, 100 km (62 mi) south of Brandon, and 250 km (160 mi) southwest of the provincial capital, Winnipeg.

== History ==
Prior to permanent settlement, the area of current-day Killarney-Turtle Mountain was well known by fur traders, explorers, and Indigenous peoples who lived and trapped along the northern edge of the Turtle Mountains.

Land surveyor and homesteader John Sydney O’Brien named the adjoining lake "Killarney" after the Irish town and Lakes of Killarney, because the landscape reminded him of home. He is said to have poured a bottle of "Good Irish" into the lake and christened it.

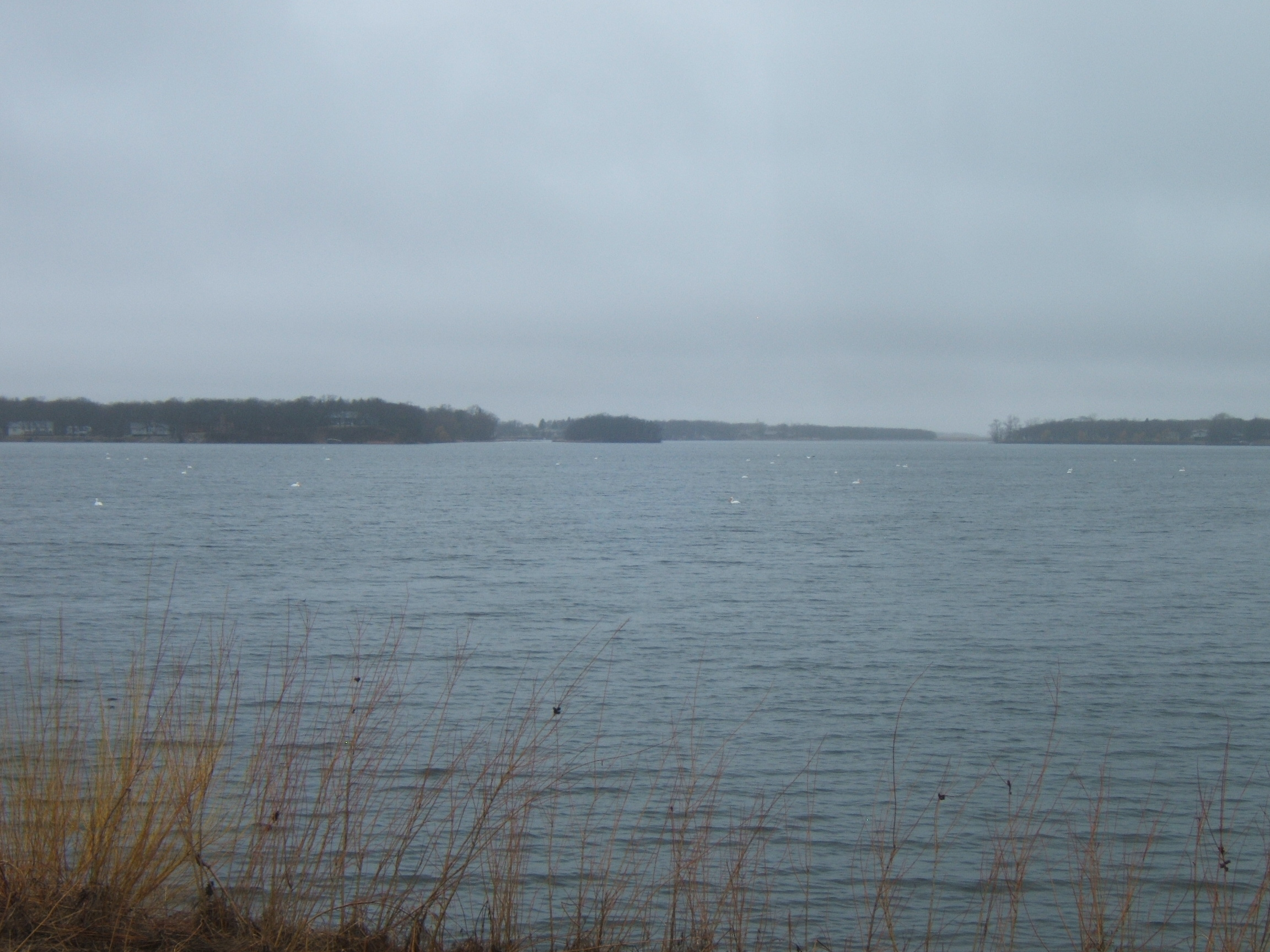
Killarney Lake, located within the community of Killarney

On August 15, 1882, the Rural Municipality of Turtle Mountain was incorporated.

In 1885, the railway came through and by the following decade the population grew to 300 people. On December 1, 1903, Killarney was incorporated as a village, breaking away from the RM of Turtle Mountain.

On June 4, 1907, the village was officially incorporated into the Town of Killarney.

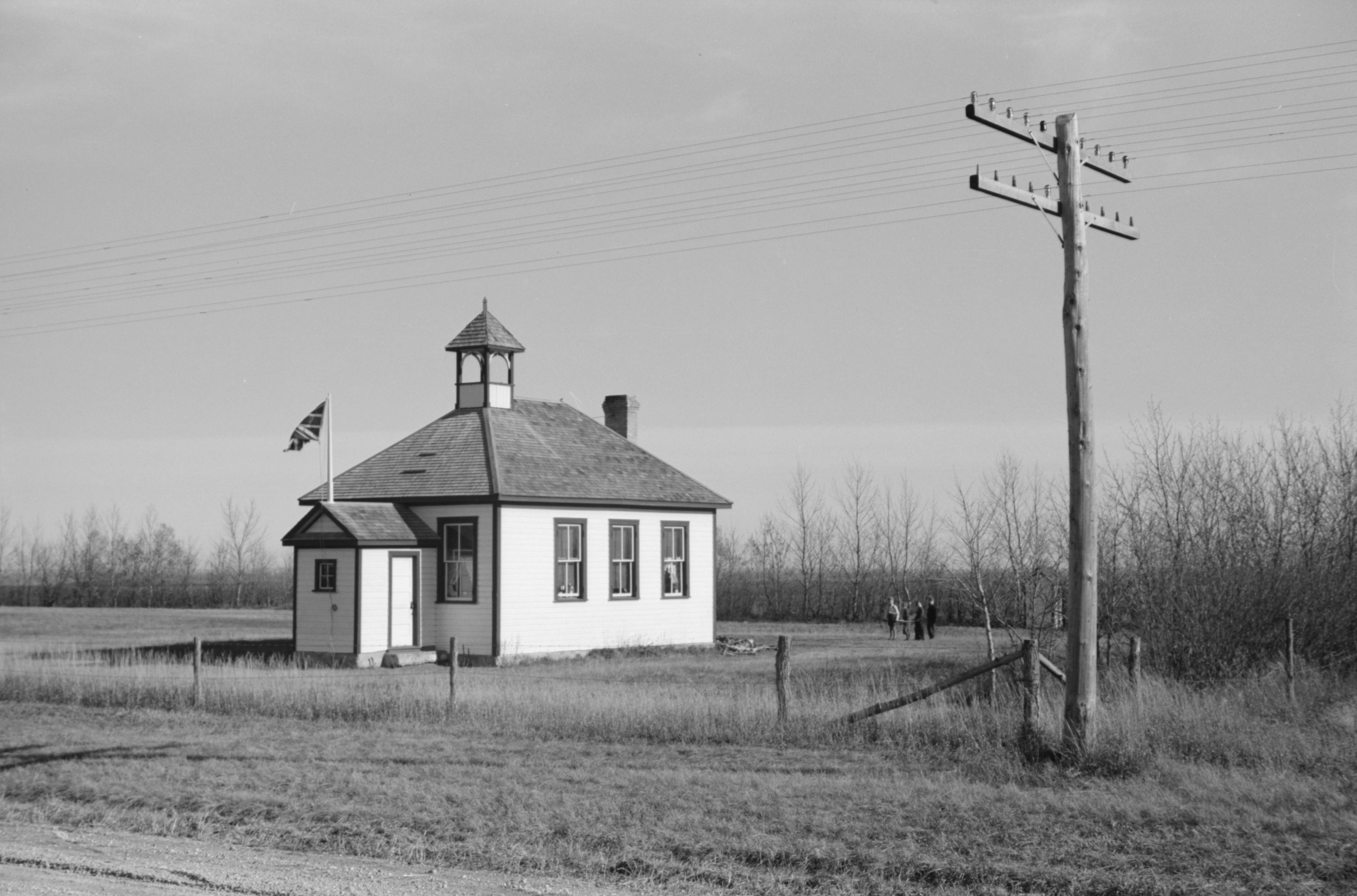
A rural Killarney schoolhouse, 1940

On January 1, 2007, the Town of Killarney amalgamated back together with the Rural Municipality of Turtle Mountain to form the Municipality of Killarney-Turtle Mountain.

Historical population
Year	Pop.	±%
1901	585	—
1911	1,010	+72.6%
1921	871	−13.8%
1931	1,003	+15.2%
1941	1,051	+4.8%
1951	1,262	+20.1%
1961	1,729	+37.0%
1996	2,208	+27.7%
2001	2,221	+0.6%
2006	2,199	−1.0%
2011	2,197	−0.1%
2016	2,315	+5.4%
2021	2,499	+7.9%

== Demographics ==
In the 2021 Census of Population conducted by Statistics Canada, Killarney had a population of 2,490 living in 1,032 of its 1,143 total private dwellings, a change of 5.2% from its 2016 population of 2,366. With a land area of 5.11 km^{2} (1.97 sq mi), it had a population density of 487.3/km^{2} (1,262.0/sq mi) in 2021.

== Economy ==
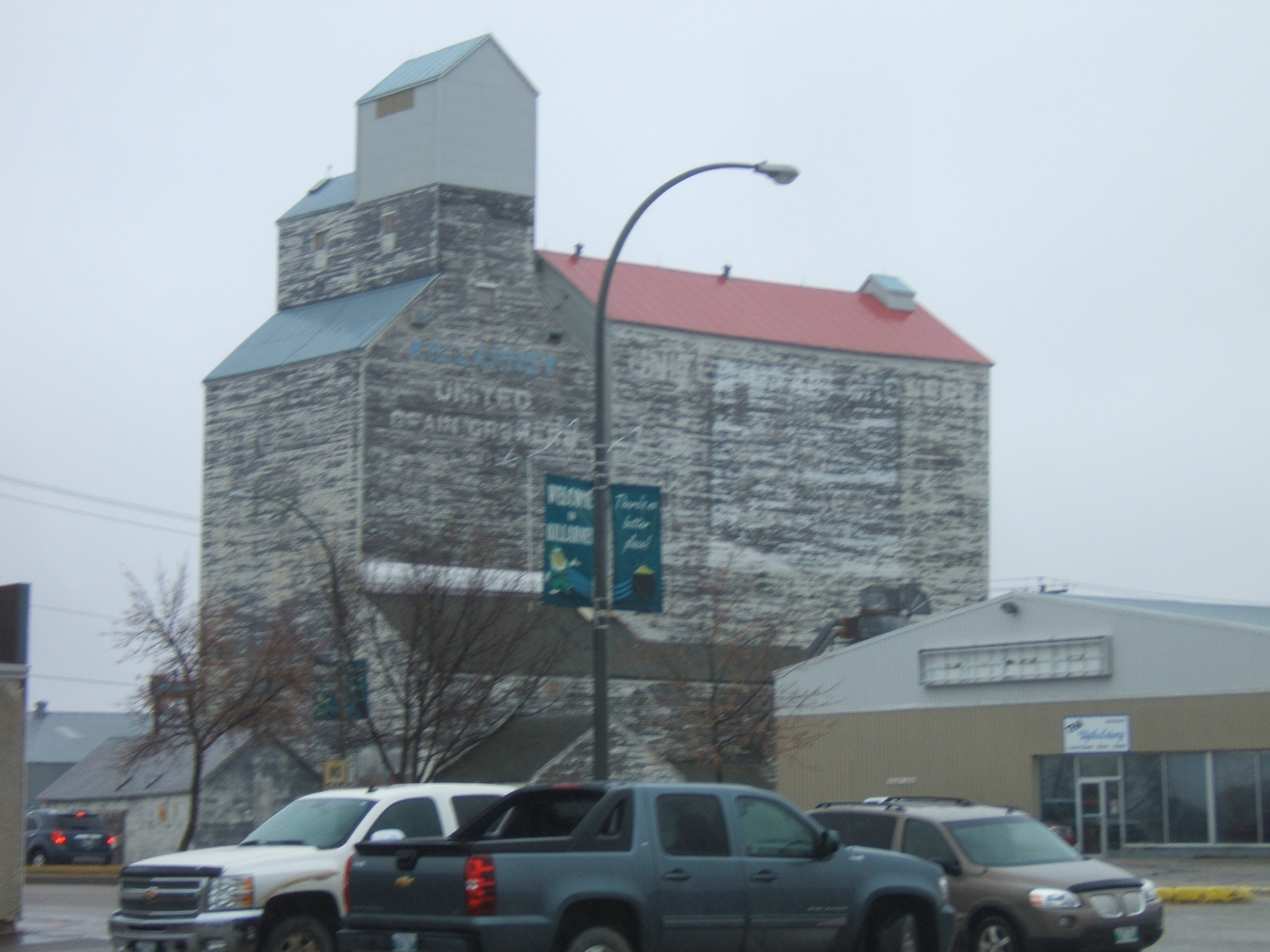
One of the old grain elevators which was demolished in 2017.

Agriculture is a large part of Killarney-Turtle Mountain's economy. Killarney boasts a variety of sales and specialized services that help complement the strong agricultural base of the community. In addition to agriculture, tourism also plays a role in the economy. The municipality attracts as many as 1,500 people each summer to its cottages and playgrounds. Killarney Lake makes up the majority of Killarney's tourism and is the focus of many activities.

Killarney has been voted the best retirement town in Canada by Canadian Living magazine.

== Government ==
The Municipality of Killarney–Turtle Mountain is governed by a Mayor and six councillors.

The mayor of the Municipality of Killarney-Turtle Mountain is Janice Smith, as of October 2022. Its previous mayor, Rick Pauls, resigned in 2020. The current Councillors are Jane Ireland, Jarod Box, Joan Kemp, Gary King, Greg Ericson, and Rick Pauls.

Provincially, the Municipality of Killarney-Turtle Mountain has been part of the riding of Turtle Mountain since it was created in the 2018 electoral redistribution. Turtle Mountain is represented by Progressive Conservative MLA Doyle Piwniuk. Federally, the municipality falls under the riding of Brandon-Souris, represented by Conservative M.P. Grant Jackson.

== Recreation ==
Killarney is home to the Killarney Shamrocks of the Tiger Hills Hockey League and the Killarney Lakers of the Border West Baseball League. The Shamrocks play out of the Killarney Shamrock Centre, which was completed in May 2008. Killarney Lakeside Golf Club is an 18-hole golf course beside Killarney Lake. The Shamrock Drive In Theatre is two miles south of town. Curling, bowling, roller skating, and a gym are available at the Killarney Shamrock Centre. A splash park is available next to the beach at Erin Park. RV parks are available next the lake at Kerry Park, and the Agricultural grounds.

== Notable people ==
- Adam J. Baker, politician
- John Conlin, Anglican bishop
- Harold Elliott, artist
- Albert Earl Godfrey, WWI flying ace
- Howard Hammell, politician
- Samuel Hayden, politician
- Allison Hossack, actress
- Alfred Alexander Leitch, pilot
- Peter J. McDonald, politician
- Richard Gavin Reid, politician
- Merv Tweed, politician
- Finlay McNaughton Young, senator
