= Boissevain, Manitoba =

Boissevain
- Population centre
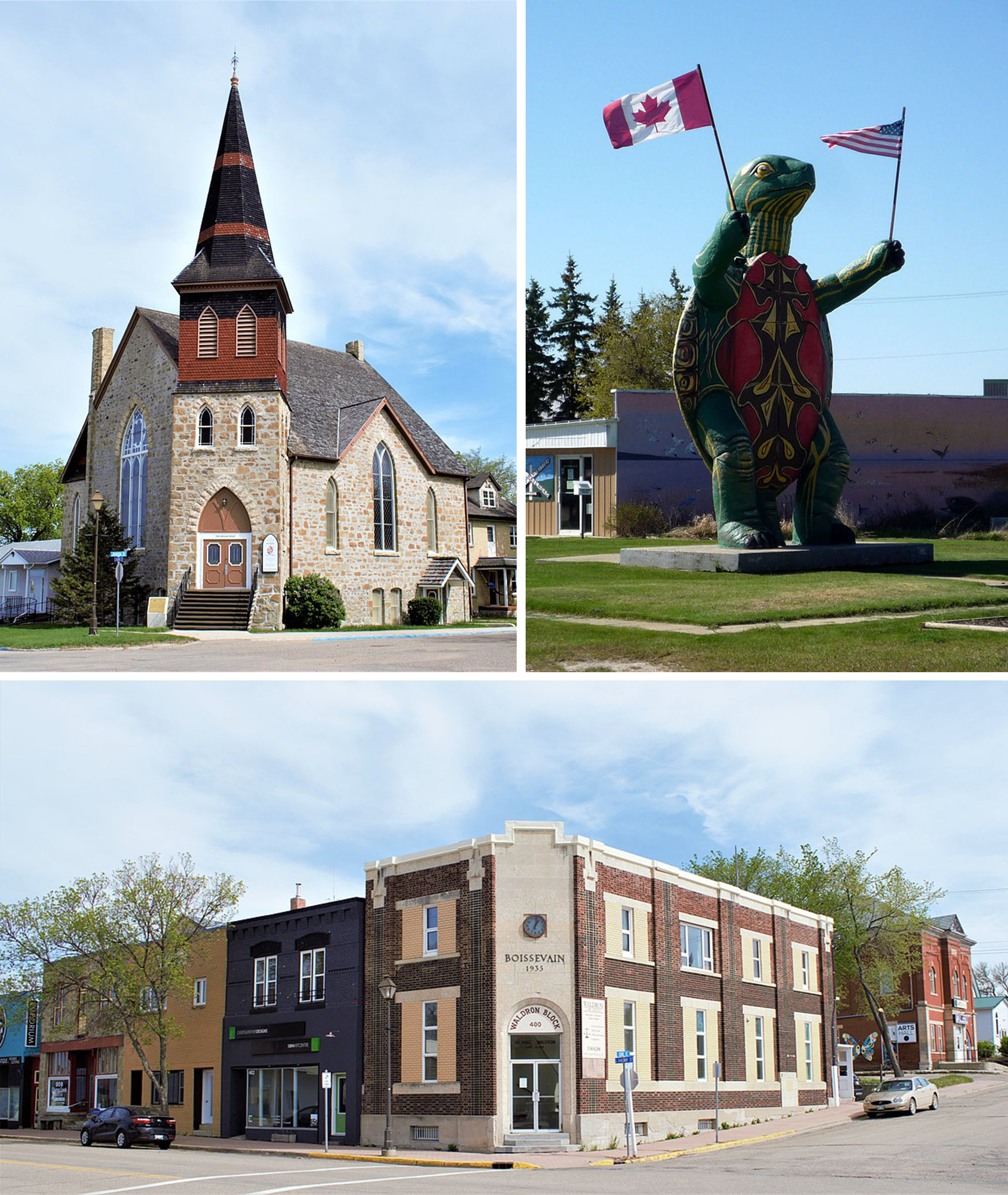
- Clockwise from upper left St. Paul's United Church, Tommy the Turtle Statue, and the former Boissevain Post Office in the town centre

- Location in Manitoba
- Coordinates: 49°13′50″N 100°03′30″W
- Country: Canada
- Province: Manitoba

Area
  - Metro: 2.54 km^{2} (0.98 sq mi)

Population (2021)
  - Population centre: 1,567
  - Density: 618.1/km^{2} (1,601/sq mi)
- Time zone: UTC−5 (CST)
  - Summer (DST): UTC−6 (CDT)

Boissevain (/ˈbɔɪzəveɪn/) is an unincorporated urban community in Manitoba near the North Dakota border that held town status prior to 2015. It is located within the Municipality of Boissevain – Morton. Boissevain is a community of just over 1,500 people and it is located between Killarney and Deloraine on the east and west and Brandon to the north. The population of the surrounding area, within a 50 kilometre radius of the community, is about 15,000.

It is notable for its proximity to the International Peace Garden, a short drive south on Highway 10. The community also displays a number of wall murals as a tourist attraction. The community was named after Adolphe Boissevain, who helped finance the Canadian Pacific Railway. Boissevain, not far from Turtle Mountain and Turtle Mountain Provincial Park, also formerly hosted the "International Turtle Derby", a turtle race, each summer. "Tommy the Turtle" is a 28-foot-tall, 10,000-lb western painted turtle that serves as an icon for both the Turtle Derby and the community as a whole.

== Etymology ==
The community was originally named Cherry Creek in 1881, the post office was opened in the town in 1886 and was named after Adolphe Boissevain, senior member of the firm Boissevain and Company who introduced Canadian Pacific Railway shares for sale in Europe. The community's school district was originally named Nimitau in 1886 when it was founded, but the name changed to Boissevain in 1894.

== History ==
Work began along the anticipated route of the Canadian Pacific Railway in 1874, surveyors were impressed with the Turtle Mountain region and noted it would become a chief point of settlement in the coming years. The site of the town of Boissevain was decided by the CPR in 1885. By 1886 there was a blacksmith shop, a post office and two grain warehouses.

As pioneer life transitioned to the comforts of a growing town, many new buildings, schools and churches were built. One of the prominent buildings constructed was the St. Matthew's Anglican Church, built with granite walls found in the local fields. Sandstone was also discovered nearby by the earlier surveyors. The sandstone was used to construct another place of worship and local landmark, the St. Paul's United Church which was completed in 1893.

Like many towns in the west, Boissevain's prosperity came with the railway, in this case the CPR line was the first to arrive in 1885. Three other additional railways in the area, including the Great Northern Railway through the railway's subsidiary organized under the name of the "Brandon, Saskatchewan and Hudson Bay Railway", which meant that farmers could now ship their goods to the United States in the south while also having a link with Brandon to the north. The railways began to decline during The Great Depression and with it the fortunes of Boissevain. The Great Northern line ended service in 1936.

== Demographics ==
In the 2021 Census of Population conducted by Statistics Canada, Boissevain had a population of 1,577 living in 700 of its 736 total private dwellings, a change of −4.8% from its 2016 population of 1,656. With a land area of 2.9 km^{2} (1.1 sq mi), it had a population density of 543.8/km^{2} (1,408.4/sq mi) in 2021.

== Education ==
Boissevain School was nominated as one of Canada's 30 best schools by Maclean's Magazine in 2005.

== Media ==
CJRB (1220 AM) broadcasts an easy listening format from Boissevain. The station is owned by Golden West Broadcasting.

== Sports ==
Curling has been a competitive sport in Boissevain since 1890. The Boissevain Border Kings compete in the South West Hockey League in Manitoba. The Border Kings did not win a championship for 35 years but then wound up winning six straight championships in 1993. In baseball, the Boissevain Centennials are a local standout and have had much success in the last decade. Winning numerous championships. The highschool baseball team has also been quite successful this decade, winning the last six Zone 9 championships and two provincial championships in 2015 and 2024, with Aaron Pugh (2015)and Bryan Laing (2024) being named provincial MVP’s. name=150facts/> Currently, the Boissevain Broncos high school sports program includes several teams competing in football, baseball, and hockey.

== Notable people ==
- John A. Campbell, politician
- Bill Crump, Anglican bishop
- Edward Dow, politician
- Betty Fox, mother of Terry Fox
- David R. Henderson, economist
- John Hettle, politician
- Zoe Hicks, softball and baseball player
- James Johnson, politician
- Reuben Martin, politician
- George William McDonald, politician
- Norah Michener, philosopher
- Randy Neufeld, curler
- Rick Neufeld, musician
- Frederick Laurence Schaffner, politician
- Jim and Ruth Deacove, Family Pastimes founders.

== See also ==
- International Peace Garden Border Crossing
