= List of Indigenous schools in Arizona =

The following is a list of Bureau of Indian Education and Tribally Controlled Schools in Arizona (including networks of such schools) grouped by county.

== Apache County ==
- Cottonwood Day School
- Cove Day School
- Kin Dah Lichi'i Olta
- Lukachukai Community School
- Many Farms Community School (formerly Chinle Boarding School)
- Many Farms High School
- Nazlini Community School
- Red Rock Day School
- Rock Point Community School
- Rough Rock Community School
- T'iis Nazbas Community Schools
- Wide Ruins Community School

== Coconino County ==
- Greyhills Academy High School
- Havasupai Elementary School
- Leupp Schools, Inc. (Leupp, Tolani Lake)
- Moencopi Day School
- NaaTsis'Aan Community School
- Tonalea Day School

== Maricopa County ==
- Salt River High School

== Navajo County ==
- Black Mesa Community School
- Chilchinbeto Community School
- Dilcon Community School
- Dishchii'bikoh Community School
- First Mesa Elementary School
- Greasewood Springs Community School
- Hopi Day School
- Hotevilla Bacavi Community School
- Jeehdeez'a Elementary School
- John F. Kennedy Day School
- Keams Canyon Elementary School
- Leupp Schools, Inc. (Birdsprings)
- Little Singer Community School
- Pinon Community School
- Second Mesa Day School
- Shonto Preparatory School

== Pima County ==
- Santa Rosa Ranch School

== Pinal County ==
- Blackwater Community School-Akimel O'otham Pee Posh Charter School
- Casa Blanca Community School
