= KEYA =

- Belcourt, North Dakota; United States
- Frequency: 88.5 MHz

Programming
- Format: Country music–news/talk
- Affiliations: National Public Radio; AIROS Native Radio Network

Ownership
- Owner: KEYA Public Radio; (KEYA, Inc.)

History
- First air date: October 1975; 50 years ago

Technical information
- Licensing authority: FCC
- Facility ID: 4590
- Class: C3
- ERP: 19,000 watts
- HAAT: 110 meters (360 ft)
- Transmitter coordinates: 48°50′37″N 99°45′2″W

Links
- Public license information: Public file; LMS
- Website: keyaradio.com

KEYA (88.5 FM), is a National Public Radio member station in Belcourt, North Dakota. Its studios are located at the Turtle Mountain Chippewa Reservation in Belcourt and have been through many renovations and changes. The station has moved through three buildings and the format has changed from vinyl to Fidelipac and most recently cassette tape and compact disc. KEYA has also employed high school workers to work the board as DJs.

The station went on the air in 1975, and claims to be the second oldest Native American-owned public radio station in the United States. The FCC licensed the station to the Belcourt School District in July 1975, and it is now licensed to KEYA Radio, Inc. It airs mostly country music and local talent during the day, supplemented by NPR News updates and All Things Considered. In the evening they play the high school DJs with a mix of pop and contemporary rock.
