= SRES =

SRES is a four letter acronym that may refer to:

- Salt River Elementary School, a tribal elementary school in Maricopa County, Arizona, near Scottsdale
- Seniors Real Estate Specialist, a real estate professional designation
- Special Report on Emissions Scenarios, a global climate change report
- the School for Resource and Environmental Studies at Dalhousie University
