= Alamo Airport =

Alamo Airport may refer to:

- Alamo Landing Field in Alamo, Nevada, United States (FAA: L92)
- Alamo Navajo Airport in Alamo, New Mexico, United States (FAA: 3N9)
- McCarran International Airport in Clark County, Nevada, United States (FAA: LAS), was known as Alamo Airport from 1942 to 1948
- San Antonio International Airport in San Antonio, Texas, United States (FAA: SAT), was known as Alamo Field
