= Supai School =

Supai School may refer to:

- Supai Middle School in Scottsdale Unified School District
- Havasupai Elementary School which is in Supai, Arizona
