= RRDS =

RRDS may refer to:

- Relative Record Data Set
- Rough Rock Demonstration School, now Rough Rock Community School
