= Charles M. Roessel =

American journalist and photographer (1961–2025)

- Roessel in 2020
- Born: June 28, 1961
- Died: January 6, 2025 (aged 63); Albuquerque, New Mexico, U.S.
- Other name: Monty Roessel
- Education: University of Northern Colorado (BS); Prescott College (MA); Arizona State University (EdD)
- Occupation: President of Diné College

Charles Monty Roessel (June 28, 1961 – January 6, 2025) was an American photographer and journalist. As an academic administrator, he served as Director of the Bureau of Indian Education from 2013 until 2016 and president of Diné College from 2017 until his death.

== Background ==
Roessel was born on June 28, 1961. He earned his bachelor's degree in photography and industrial arts at the University of Northern Colorado in 1984.

Roessel died in Albuquerque from cancer on January 6, 2025, at the age of 63.

== Career ==
=== Journalism and photography ===
After graduating with his bachelor's degree, he worked as a photojournalist in Greeley. He left Greeley to become managing editor of the Navajo Times until 1987. For two years, starting in 1990, he was vice president, co-owner and editor of Navajo Nation Today. In 1995, he earned his Master of Arts in journalism at Prescott College. That same year, he published a children's book: Songs from the Loom: A Navajo Girl Learns to Weave. As a journalist, he also contributed pieces to New Mexico Magazine.

In 2004, Roessel's photography appeared in the exhibition "Viewpoints: Native Americans and Photography" at the Arizona State Museum. As a photographer, his work has also appeared in Arizona Highways, New Mexico Magazine, Newsweek, Time, Sports Illustrated and Native Peoples.

=== Education ===
From September 1997 to December 2000, Roessel was director of the Navajo Nation Round Rock Chapter AmeriCorps. Roessel worked at Rough Rock Community School from 1998 until 2011, starting as director of community services. He also taught photography and coached baseball. He was named executive director in 2000 and seven years later, in 2007, he became superintendent. During his time at Rough Rock, he oversaw major capital projects funded by the American Recovery and Reinvestment Act of 2009. In 2007, he completed his doctorate at Arizona State University in Tempe in Educational Administration and Supervision. That same year, he published a second children's book: Kinaalda: A Navajo girl grows up.

In 2010, he became chair of the Department of the Interior's No Child Left Behind Negotiated Rule Making Committee. He also served on the Sovereignty in Navajo Education Reauthorization Task Force with the Navajo Education Department of Diné Education.

Roessel became associate deputy director for Navajo Schools under the Bureau of Indian Education ("BIE") in 2011. During this time, he oversaw 66 BIE schools on the Navajo Nation. Starting in February 2012, Roessel began serving as acting director of the BIE. In December 2013, he was named director. Roessel was demoted in 2016 after an investigation by the Interior Department's Office of Inspector General revealed he had used his position as director to get a friend a job in the department and getting a relative a job with the Navajo Nation.

==== Diné College ====
In 2017, Roessel was named the 18th president of Diné College. His father, Bob Roessel, co-founded the school. During the COVID-19 pandemic, Roessel invested stimulus funds from the CARES Act to purchase rental laptops and internet access for students at Diné, where approximately 86 percent of students do not have at home internet access. He also created an emergency aid program which distributed over 300 checks to qualifying students to support basic needs. Graduation was also held online. Before his death, he led the transformation of the former two-year college into a four-year institution.

== Works by Roessel ==
- (1993). Kinaaldá: A Navajo Girl Grows Up. Minneapolis, MN: Lerner Publ. Group. ISBN 0822596415
- (1995) Songs from the Loom: A Navajo Girl Learns to Weave. Minneapolis, MN: Lerner Publ. Group. ISBN 0822597128
- (1996). Navajo Photography. American Indian Culture and Research Journal, 20(3), 83–91. doi:10.17953/aicr.20.3.225476644v811528
- with Peter Iverson (2002). Diné: A History of the Navajos. Albuquerque, NM: University of New Mexico Press. ISBN 082632715X
- (2018). Self-Determination as a School Improvement Strategy. Journal of American Indian Education, 57(1), 177. doi:10.5749/jamerindieduc.57.1.0177
