= Bureau of Indian Education =

United States government agency

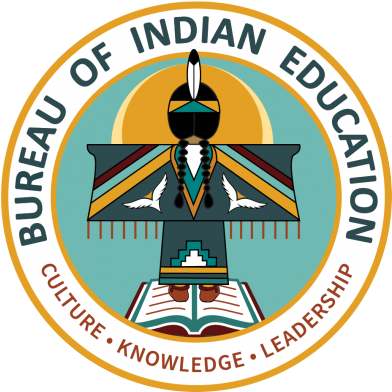

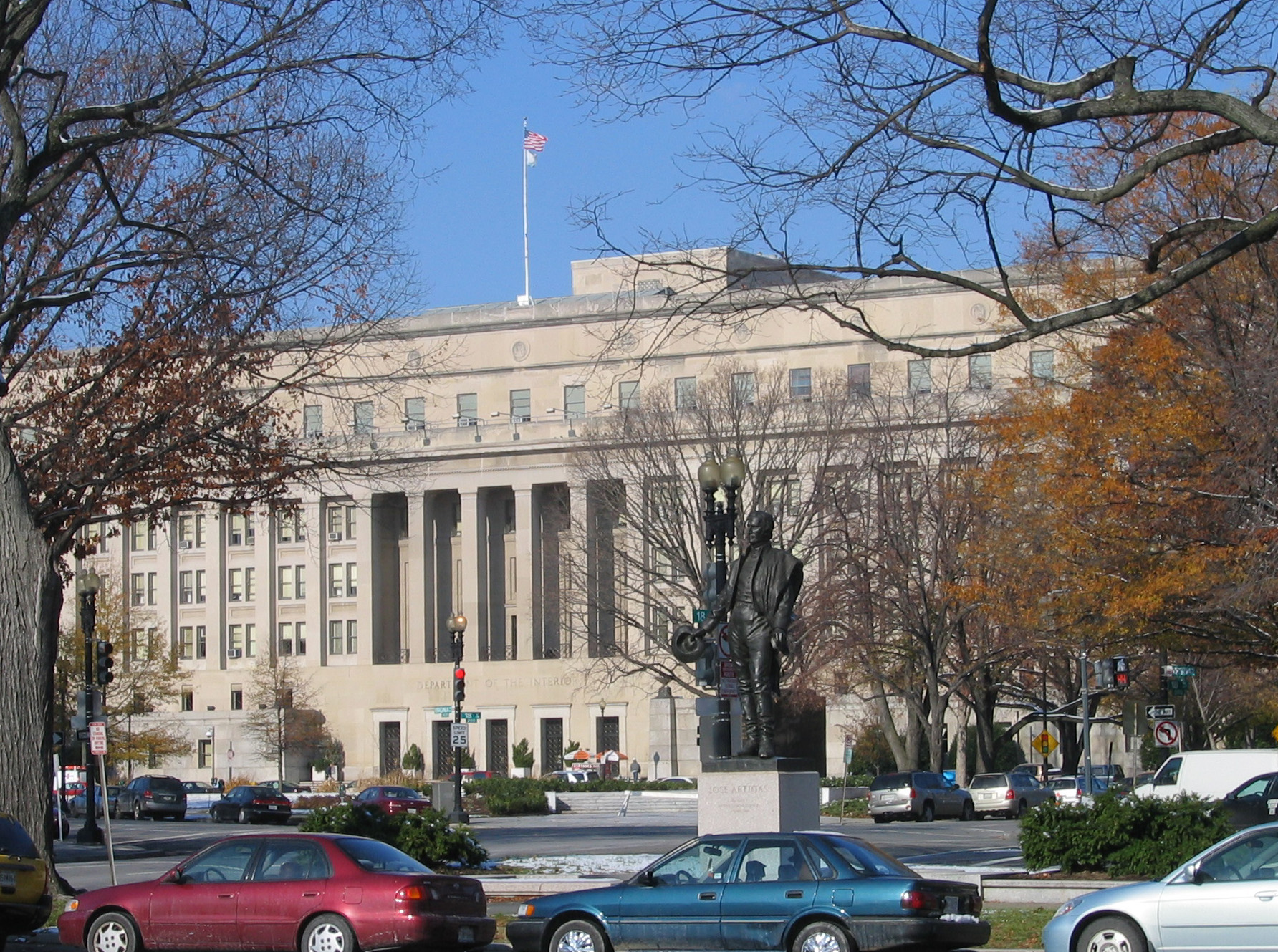
- Main Interior Building, where the BIE is headquartered

Agency overview
- Formed: 2006
- Preceding agency: Office of Indian Education Programs
- Headquarters: Washington, D.C., U.S.
- Agency executives: Tony L. Dearman, Director; Sharon Pinto, Deputy Bureau Director; Margo DeLaune, Chief Academic Officer; Travis Clark, Chief of Staff
- Website: bie.edu

The Bureau of Indian Education (BIE) is a division of the U.S. Department of the Interior under the assistant secretary for Indian affairs that directs and manages education functions. Formerly known as the Office of Indian Education Programs (OIEP), it is headquartered in the Main Interior Building in Washington, D.C.

The BIE school system has 183 elementary and secondary schools and dormitories located on 64 reservations in 23 states, including seven off-reservation boarding schools, and 122 schools directly controlled by tribes and tribal school boards under contracts or grants with the BIE. The bureau also funds 66 residential programs for students at 52 boarding schools and at 14 dormitories housing those attending nearby tribal or public schools. It is one of two U.S. federal government school systems, along with the Department of Defense Education Activity (DoDEA).

In the area of post-secondary education, the BIE provides support to 29 tribal colleges and universities across the U.S. serving over 46,000 students. It directly operates two institutions of higher learning: Haskell Indian Nations University (HINU) in Lawrence, Kansas, and Southwestern Indian Polytechnic Institute (SIPI) near Albuquerque, New Mexico. Additionally, the BIE operates higher education scholarship programs for American Indians and Alaska Natives.

Alden Woods of The Arizona Republic wrote in 2020 that the BIE is "an overlooked and often criticized agency".

== History ==
Circa 1990 the Hopi tribe began the process of taking BIA schools in their territory into tribal control. They managed this under authorization provided by legislation in 1975, which allowed tribes to contract with the BIA/BIE to manage and operate their own schools.

The Indian Self-Determination and Education Assistance Act of 1975 was not the only legislation act that contributed to transforming the Bureau of Indian Education. Shortly after the 1975 legislation act, The Education Amendments Act of 1978 was put into motion and influenced radical changes that set the foundation for the B.I.E. The 1978 legislation act allowed for qualified teachers and staff members to be hired, ensured financial support for institutions that were directed by tribal influence, and established support for Indian school boards.

Prior to August 29, 2006, it was known as the Bureau of Indian Affairs (BIA) Office of Indian Education Programs (OIEP). The reason the name "Office of Indian Education Programs" was changed to the "Bureau of Indian Education" was to establish the connection and shared mission that the BIE shares with other programs in the "Office of Assistant Secretary for Indian Affairs."

== Operations ==
The headquarters is in the Main Interior Building in Washington, DC.

The federal government funds schools for Native Americans under the treaties it established for reservations and trust lands. In the early years, the government authorized religious missions to establish schools and churches on reservations. At the end of the 19th and early 20th centuries, Congress authorized the government to establish numerous Indian boarding schools for a more concerted program of assimilation of Native American children. These were established at both the elementary and high school levels.

As Indian reservations cannot levy taxes, local school taxes cannot be used to fund Native American schools.

Alden Woods of the Arizona Republic described the BIE as having the characteristics of both a state education agency and a school district, with its supervision and funding of tribally controlled/grant schools making it the former and its direct operation of BIE schools making it the latter. By the beginning of the 21st century, education expenses of the BIE represented 35% of the BIA budget. But studies since the 1969 Kennedy Report have shown that the schools have been underfunded. Despite the education responsibility, much of the BIA staff are specialists in land management rather than education.

Since the 1970s, school boards have been elected on reservations to oversee BIE schools, as in the Southwest United States.

In 2015 the BIE spent about $15,000 per student in the schools it operated, 56% above the per-student average cost for a public school student in the United States. The BIE schools were ranked as among the most costly to operate in the United States.

The predecessor agency OEIP had say only in operations related to instruction, while other BIA agencies had controlled other aspects, such as hiring and other employee issues, and construction and renovation of schools, and related infrastructure such as roads. Severns wrote that the various sources of authority made school accountability difficult.

A 2015 editorial of the Minneapolis Star-Tribune noted that schools in the BIE network were underfunded while schools in the Department of Defense Education Activity (DoDEA), the federal military dependent school network, were well funded.

== Student body ==
As of 2020 the BIE-funded/grant/direct schools in total had 46,000 students, meaning they educated about 8% of the Native American students in the United States. Members of some tribes have moved to cities, and many states have increased coverage of reservation and tribal lands through their public school districts. As of 2020 about 90% of Native American students attended public schools operated by local school districts, rather than federally funded or operated schools.

As of 2021 the BIE schools are located in many isolated areas with some of the lowest incomes in the United States. Maggie Severns of Politico wrote in 2015 that "Students often come from difficult backgrounds".

In 1978, 47,000 Native American K-12 students (17% of the total number of Native American K-12 students in the United States) attended schools directly operated by the BIA, and 2,500 (1%) attended tribal schools and/or other schools that contracted with the BIA.

== Employees ==
Circa 2015 the BIE had 4,500 employees. In November 2015 the BIE had 140 empty teaching slots. The agency had difficulty with teacher retention, especially as many schools are located in isolated areas. Today in the year 2025 during the month of February, the BIE experienced an even more severe decrease in the number of teachers and faculty members who are employees of the BIE. This is a result of president Trump's decision in making a reduction of staffing on a very large scale. President Trump's action has majorly affected institutions throughout the BIE. One example is Haskell University which has experienced a pause in financial aid distribution, more than thirty courses lacking teachers, and over all a quarter of staff being terminated. These are severe impacts that affect the quality of education that students attending native schools receive.

== Academic performance and reputation ==
BIA/BIE schools have been criticized for decades for poor academic performance, and for the failure to establish metrics that allow performance to be measured. In 1969 the graduation rate was about 59%. Circa 1970 the overall dropout rate of BIA schools was 100% higher than the U.S. dropout average. Citing this statistic, that year President of the United States Richard Nixon criticized BIA schools. The 1969 report by the Select Subcommittee of the U.S. Senate in 1969 (known as the Kennedy Report, as it was headed by Robert F. Kennedy prior to his assassination) also criticized BIA schools. Academic performance in BIE schools is not the only thing that has received criticism or questioning by the public. There have been major concerns regarding students' health and safety because of the poor quality of school facilities. A variety of different factors have contributed to this. Some of these factors include limited funding and poor management structures. School facilities with poor quality create an effect on important aspects such as students learning efficiency, the number of students who decide to attend, and the overall reputation of BIE schools. In 1988 a Department of Interior report blamed all levels of leadership for substandard test scores. In 2001 the Government Accountability Office (GAO) wrote "The academic achievement of many BIA students as measured by their performance on standardized tests and other measures is far below the performance of students in public schools. BIA students also score considerably below national averages on college admissions tests."Bill Clinton, George W. Bush, and Barack Obama made attempts to improve BIE schools. Another attempt made to resolve the issue of poor academic performance in BIE schools, was the legislation act of 2001 titled "The No Child Left Behind Act" which put the new ruling into effect that says schools will be held responsible for making the effort to improve their students' academic performances. By doing so, students' will be able to better retain the information they are learning in school and their test scores will showcase notable improvement.

In 2015 Maggie Severns of Politico wrote that BIE students "have some of the lowest test scores and graduation rates in the country".

In the 2018–2019 school year, the percentage of BIE students passing their schools' standardized examinations was about 10% for mathematics and 15% for the English language. In 2011 BIE students scored better on examinations than students at Detroit Public Schools, but every other large urban school district outperformed students of BIE schools.

In 2015 the graduation rate was 53%. In the 2017–2018 school year, the graduation rate was 64%, but in 2018–2019 the graduation rate had declined to 59%. In 2015 the average United States graduation rate was 81%. The graduation rate for Native American and Alaska Native students enrolled at school district-operated public schools was 67%.

From circa 2017 to 2020, the BIE did not follow the terms of the Every Student Succeeds Act. As of 2020 the BIE does not have a consistent testing system for all schools, nor does it provide the public academic outcomes information that traditional public schools are required to publish under state laws.

== Schools ==
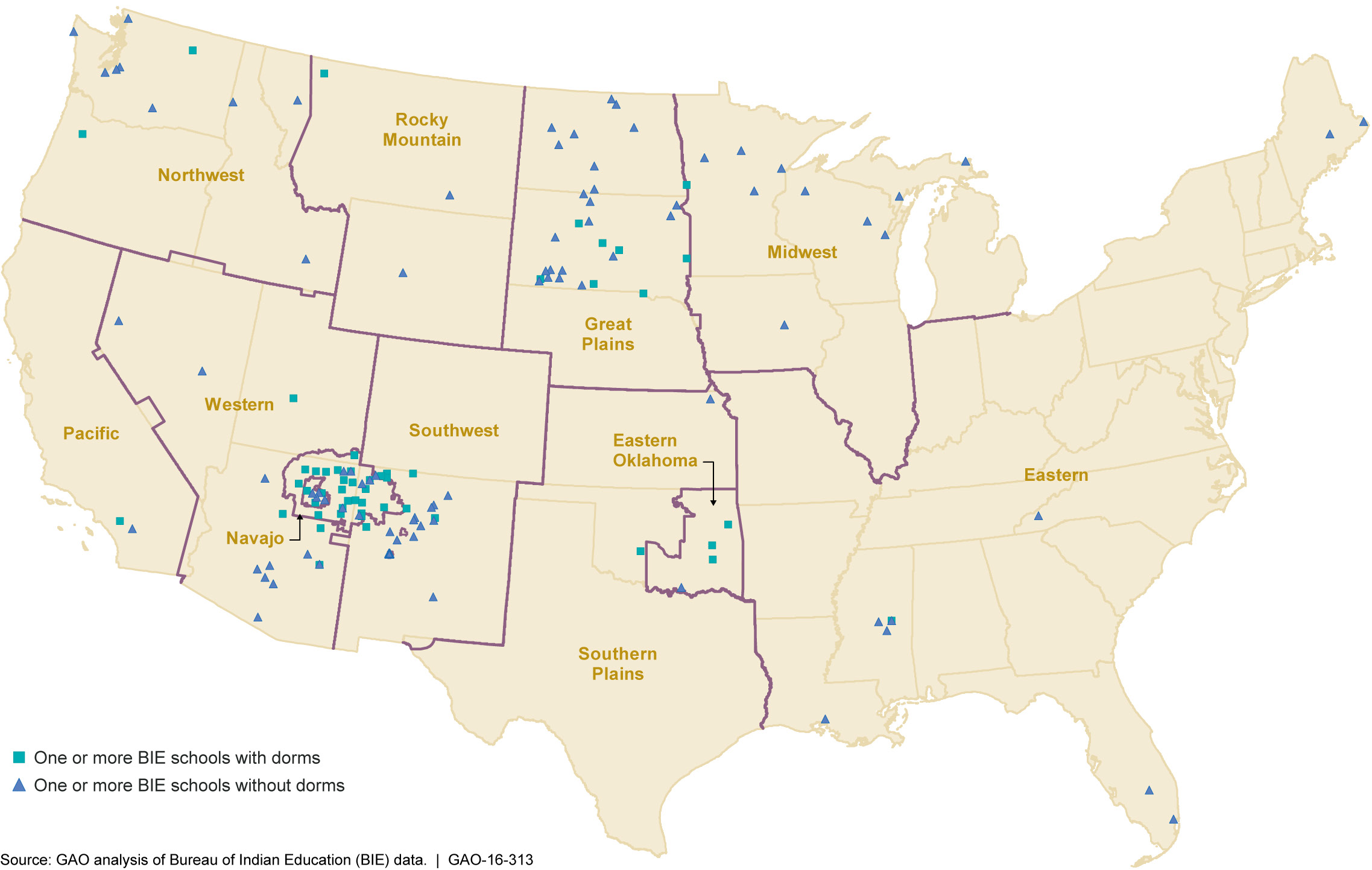
Map of zip codes within the contiguous United States which contain a BIE school

BIE network schools are often located in rural, isolated areas where alternative options for schooling are not feasible. As of 2020 there were 180 schools in the BIE network.

In 1987 the BIA supported 58 tribal schools and directly operated 17 boarding schools, 17 day schools, and 14 dormitories housing students enrolled in public schools operated by local school districts.

In comparison to the numbers recorded from the year 1987, throughout the 2020–2021 school year, the number of students that were enrolled in institutions that were funded by the BIE was 34,529. Out of those 34,529 enrolled students, 24,240 were enrolled in schools that were led by trial influence and 10,289 enrolled in schools that were controlled by the BIE.

In 2003, the state with the largest number of BIA-OIEP network schools was Arizona, and the state with the next highest number was New Mexico. Since 2003, Arizona and New Mexico remain the states with the largest number of BIE-funded students: 9,113 in Arizona and 7,439 in New Mexico.

=== Directly operated ===
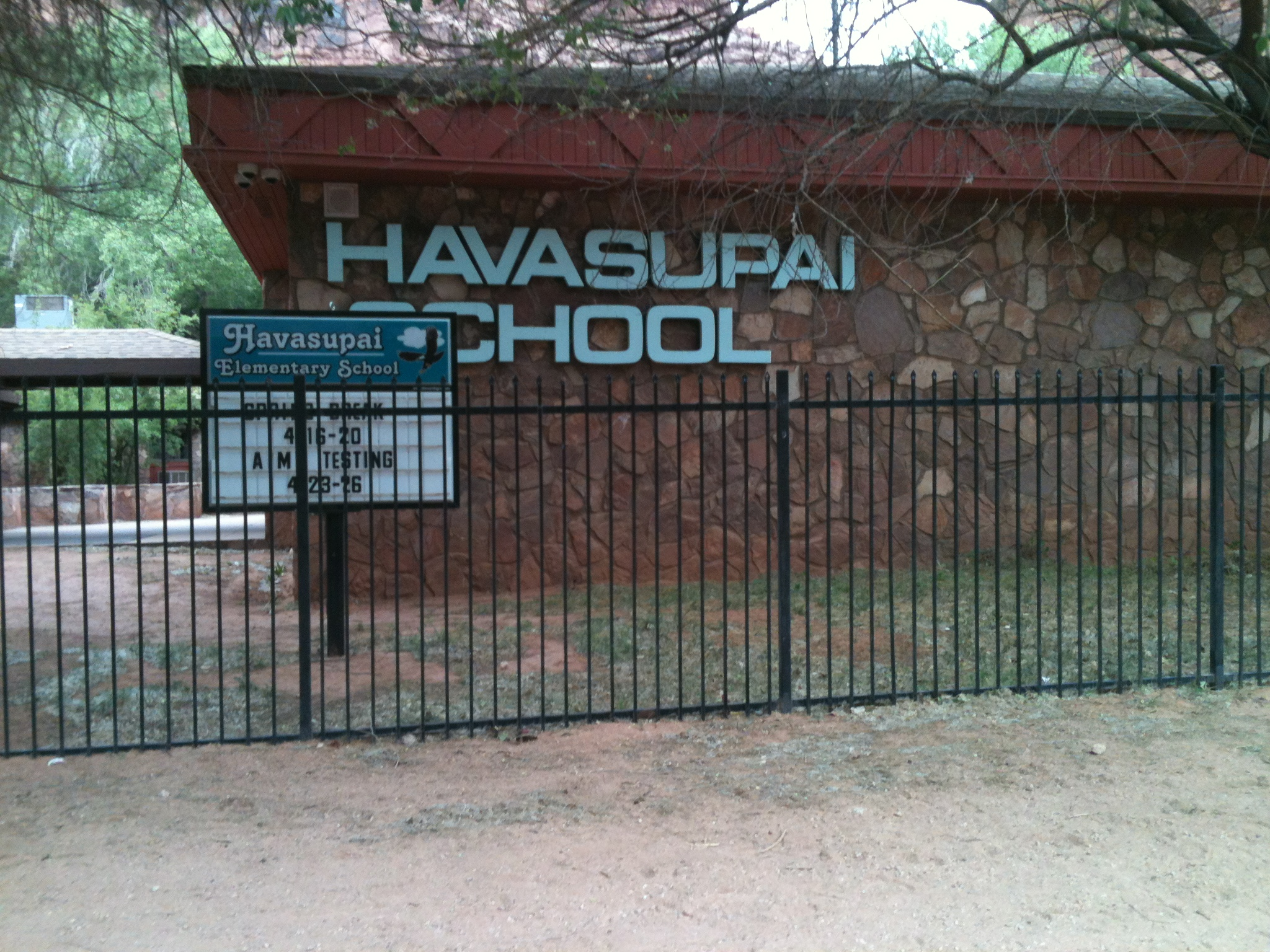
Havasupai Elementary School in Supai, Arizona

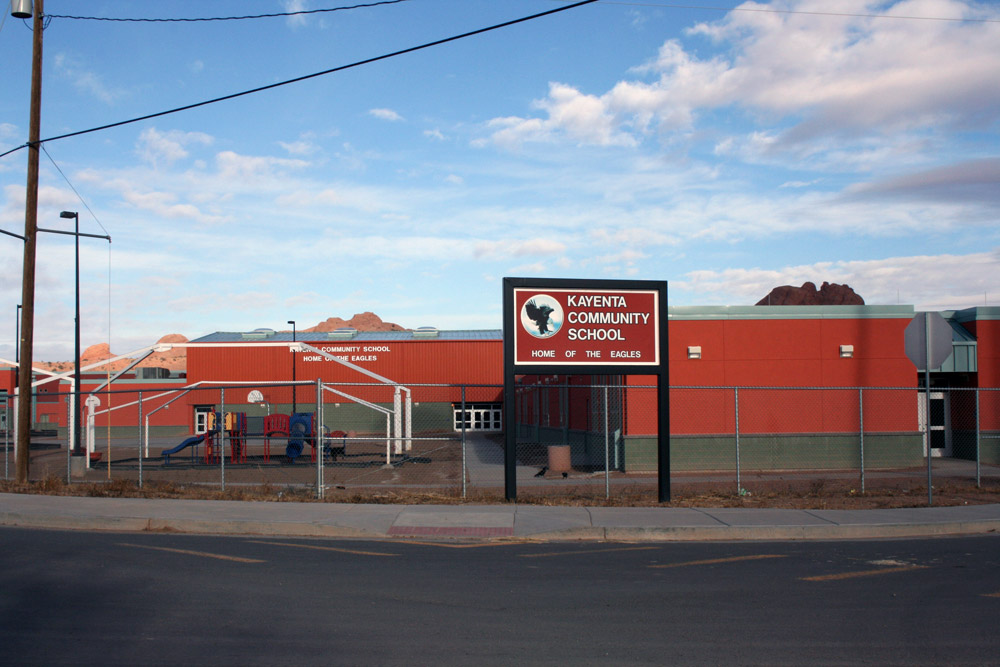
Kayenta Community School in Kayenta, Arizona

As of 2020 the BIE operates about 33% of the schools in its system. A listing of schools directly operated by the Bureau of Indian Education:

- Albuquerque Center:
  - Flandreau Indian Boarding School (Flandreau Township, Moody County, South Dakota)
  - Isleta Elementary School (Pueblo of Isleta, New Mexico)
  - Jemez Day School (Jemez Pueblo, New Mexico)
  - Riverside Indian School (Caddo County, Oklahoma)
  - San Felipe Pueblo Elementary School (San Felipe Pueblo, New Mexico)
  - San Ildefonso Day School (Jaconita, New Mexico)
  - Sky City Community School (Acoma Pueblo, New Mexico)
  - Taos Day School (Taos Pueblo, New Mexico)
  - T'siya Day School (Zia Pueblo, New Mexico)
- Belcourt, North Dakota Center:
  - Blackfeet Dormitory (Blackfeet Reservation/Glacier County, Montana)
  - Cheyenne-Eagle Butte School (split between North Eagle Butte and Eagle Butte, South Dakota)
  - Dunseith Day School (Turtle Mountain Indian Reservation, North Dakota)
  - Ojibwa Indian School (Turtle Mountain Indian Reservation, North Dakota)
  - Pine Ridge School (Pine Ridge, South Dakota)
  - Turtle Mountain Elementary School (Belcourt, North Dakota)
  - Turtle Mountain Middle School (Belcourt, North Dakota)
- Phoenix, Arizona Resource Center:
  - Chemawa Indian School (Salem, Oregon)
  - First Mesa Elementary School (Polacca, Arizona/Hopi Reservation)
  - Havasupai Elementary School (Supai, Arizona/Havasupai Indian Reservation)
  - John F. Kennedy Day School (Fort Apache Indian Reservation/Gila County, Arizona)
  - Keams Canyon Elementary School (Keams Canyon, Arizona/Hopi Reservation)
  - San Simon School (Wahak Hotrontk, Arizona/Tohono Oʼodham Indian Reservation)
  - Santa Rosa Day School (Santa Rosa, Arizona/Tohono Oʼodham Indian Reservation)
  - Santa Rosa Ranch School (Schuchk, Arizona/Tohono Oʼodham Indian Reservation)
  - Sherman Indian High School (Riverside, California)
  - Tohono O'odham High School (Wahak Hotrontk, Arizona/Tohono Oʼodham Indian Reservation)
- Window Rock, Arizona Resource Center:
  - Bread Springs Day School (Navajo Nation Off-Reservation Trust Land/McKinley County, New Mexico)
  - Chi Chil'tah Community School (Chi Chil'tah, New Mexico with a Vanderwagen postal address)
  - Crystal Boarding School (Crystal, New Mexico with a Navajo postal address)
  - Pine Springs Day School (Navajo Reservation/Apache County, Arizona)
  - Wingate Elementary School (Fort Wingate, New Mexico)
  - Wingate High School (Fort Wingate, New Mexico)
- Chinle, Arizona Resource Center:
  - Cottonwood Day School (Cottonwood, Apache County, Arizona, west of Chinle)
  - Dennehotso Boarding School (Dennehotso, Arizona)
  - Jeehdeez'a Academy, Inc. (Navajo Reservation/Navajo County, Arizona)
  - Many Farms High School (Many Farms, Arizona)
- Tuba City, Arizona Resource Center:
  - Kaibeto Boarding School (Navajo Reservation/Coconino County, Arizona)
  - Rocky Ridge Boarding School (Kykotsmovi, Arizona)
  - Seba Dalkai Boarding School (Seba Dalkai, Arizona)
  - Tonalea (Red Lake) Day School (Tonalea, Arizona)
  - Tuba City Boarding School (Tuba City, Arizona)
- Crownpoint, New Mexico Resource Center:
  - Baca/Dlo'ay Azhi Community School (Prewitt, New Mexico)
  - Ojo Encino Day School (Ojo Encino, New Mexico)
  - Pueblo Pintado Community School (Pueblo Pintado, New Mexico, Cuba address)
  - Lake Valley Navajo School (near Crownpoint, New Mexico)
  - Mariano Lake Community School (near Crownpoint, New Mexico)
  - T'iis Ts'ozi Bi'Olta' (Crownpoint Community School) (Crownpoint, New Mexico)
  - Tohaali' Community School (Newcomb, New Mexico)
  - Tse'ii'ahi' Community School (near Crownpoint, New Mexico)
- Shiprock, New Mexico Resource Center:
  - Aneth Community School (Montezuma Creek, Utah)
  - Beclabito Day School (Shiprock, New Mexico)
  - Cove Day School (Red Valley, Arizona)
  - Kayenta Community School (Kayenta, Arizona)
  - Nenahnezad Community School (Nenahnezad, New Mexico, near Fruitland)
  - Red Rock Day School (Red Valley, Arizona)
  - Sanostee Day School (Sanostee, New Mexico)
  - T'iis Nazbas Community School (Teec Nos Pos, Arizona)

==== Cottonwood Day School ====
It is a K-8 school in Cottonwood, Apache County, Arizona, with a Chinle address. It was dedicated in 1968.

==== Cove Day School ====
It is an elementary school in Cove, Arizona. In addition to Cove, the school has students from Mitten Rock, Oak Springs, and Red Valley.

The school is in proximity to multiple uranium mines. The current building opened in 1959. In 2022 the school had 50 students.

==== Crystal Boarding School ====
Crystal Boarding School is a K-6 boarding school in Crystal, New Mexico. It opened in 1935 as part of an effort to replace off-reservation Indian boarding schools with on-reservation boarding schools, as a part of the New Deal project. In 2014 about 30 students boarded but most did not. Only one dormitory was open, as another was deemed unsafe. In 2013 5% of the students were classified as having mathematics skills on par with their grade levels even though the school had already shifted most of its instruction to mathematics and reading at the expense of science and social studies. In 2015 Politico stated that the school's campus was in a poor condition. It had no school counselor.

==== Dennehotso Boarding School ====
Dennehotso Boarding School in Dennehotso, Arizona serves grades K–8.

It opened as a one room school in 1935. Circa 1947 the school was expanded. In 1951, the school had five teachers.

Eddie Thompson served as principal until 1973. Kenneth L. Owens, who previously taught at Dennehotso Boarding, became principal in 1974.

The two current buildings are OFMC projects: a 46,545-square-foot (4,324.2 m^{2}) school facility for 186 students and a 10,072-square-foot (935.7 m^{2}) dormitory for 33 students. The scheduled groundbreaking was February 11, 2013. The previous buildings scheduled for demolition had a total of 78,626 square feet (7,304.6 m^{2}) of space. The school provides transportation for students between Baby Rocks and Mexican Water, and asks families living outside of that area and/or distant from the highway to have their children stay at the dormitory.

==== Kayenta Community School ====
Kayenta Community School is a K-8 school. The facility, also known as Kayenta Boarding School, is a boarding school serving both day and dormitory students.

It opened in 1935 as the Kayenta Indian School.

In 1985 the school had 520 students and 19 employees. The school at the time had 11 staff positions in which the school could not hire anyone, a position that Robert LaFlore, the principal, called "not quite normal". Some of the teachers left to work at the Kayenta Unified School District.

==== Red Rock Day School ====
The school is a K-8 school in Red Valley, Arizona. It was created in or after 1932, with the building completed in 1935. Circa 1950 it gained boarding facilities and was known as Red Rock Boarding School, but it later reverted into being a day school.

In 1974 its enrollment was 83. At the time it was the only BIA school in which all of its employees were Navajo people. In that year the school was hiring ethnic Navajo, bilingual in English and Navajo, who were finishing their university educations. Additionally, by that year it had a forked stick hogan in which it held some classes taught by Navajo senior citizens. The hogan was the impetus of Navajo senior citizens who paid the money to have it built and who built it.

In 2022 the school had 114 students.

==== Rocky Ridge Boarding School ====
It is a K-8 boarding school in Kykotsmovi, Arizona.

In 2020 its enrollment was over 100. Alden Woods of The Arizona Republic stated "One former student described it as a refuge from a rural community struggling through generations of trauma", stating that the school provides room and board to children with no other reliable source of food and lodging.

On March 16, 2020, during the COVID-19 pandemic in Arizona, the State of Arizona closed district-operated public schools. BIE schools were not required to close at that time, though several did. After employees met that day, COVID spread through the school's community. Once COVID infections were diagnosed, the school temporarily closed.

It holds an equine (horse) festival every year.

==== T'iis Nazbas Community School ====
It is a K-8 school in Teec Nos Pos. It has a dormitory facility.

It opened in 1933 as the Teec Nos Pos Boarding School.

A building for the Teec Nos Pos Boarding School was dedicated in 1962. In 1962 the school had 353 students. In 1963 there were plans to build 17 additional classrooms as well as a cafeteria, two dormitories, and a multipurpose room, and housing for employees. The capacity, after the additions, would be over 1,000. In 1991 the Teec Nos Pos school facility lacked fire alarms and other fire protection systems.

==== Wingate Elementary School ====
As of 1956 the Wingate Elementary dormitory is a former military barracks that also houses students at Wingate High. In 1968 the girls' dormitory had 125 girls; the Associated Press stated that the dormitory lacked decoration and personal effects and was reflective of a campaign to de-personalize Native American students. At the time the school strongly discouraged students from speaking Navajo and wanted them to only speak English. Circa 1977 it opened a 125-student $90,000 building which used a solar heating system.

=== Tribally operated ===
There are also tribally operated schools affiliated with the BIE.

- Albuquerque Resource Center:
  - Blackwater Community School (Coolidge, Arizona/Gila River Indian Community)
  - Casa Blanca Community School (Bapchule, Arizona/Gila River Indian Community)
  - Dishchii'bikoh Community School (Cibecue, Arizona/ Fort Apache Indian Reservation)
  - Gila Crossing Community School (Komatke, Arizona/Gila River Indian Community)
  - Hopi Day School (Kykotsmovi, Arizona/Hopi Reservation)
  - Hopi Junior/Senior High School (Keams Canyon, Arizona/Hopi Reservation)
  - Hotevilla Bacavi Community School (Hotevilla, Arizona/Hopi Reservation)
  - Jicarilla Dormitory School (Dulce, New Mexico)
  - Kha'p'o Community School (Santa Clara Pueblo, New Mexico – Espanola address)
  - Laguna Elementary School (Laguna Pueblo, New Mexico)
  - Laguna Middle School (Laguna Pueblo, New Mexico)
  - Mescalero Apache School (Mescalero, New Mexico)
  - Moencopi Day School (Moenkopi, Arizona/Hopi Reservation with a Tuba City postal address)
  - Ohkay Owingeh Community School (Ohkay Owingeh, New Mexico)
  - Pine Hill Schools (Pine Hill, New Mexico)
  - Salt River Elementary School (Salt River Pima–Maricopa Indian Community, near Scottsdale, Arizona)
  - Santa Fe Indian School (Santa Fe, New Mexico)
  - Second Mesa Day School (Second Mesa, Arizona/Hopi Reservation)
  - Te Tsu Geh Oweenge Day School a.k.a. Tesuque Day School (Tesuque Pueblo, New Mexico, near Santa Fe)
  - Theodore Roosevelt School (Fort Apache, Arizona/Fort Apache Indian Reservation)
- Window Rock, Arizona Resource Center:
  - Hunters Point Boarding School (St. Michaels, Arizona)
  - Kin Dah Lichi'I Olta (Ganado, Arizona)
  - T'iisyaakin Residential Hall (Holbrook, Arizona)
  - Wide Ruins Community School (Chambers, Arizona)
  - Winslow Residential Hall (Winslow, Arizona)
- Chinle, Arizona Resource Center:
  - Black Mesa Community School (Pinon, Arizona)
  - Greasewood Springs Community School (Ganado, Arizona)
  - Lukachukai Community School (Lukachukai, Arizona)
  - Many Farms Community School (Many Farms, Arizona)
  - Nazlini Community School (Ganado, Arizona)
  - Pinon Community School (Pinon, Arizona)
  - Rock Point Community School (Rock Point, Arizona)
  - Rough Rock Community School (Chinle, Arizona)
- Tuba City, Arizona Resource Center:
  - Chilchinbeto Community School (Kayenta, Arizona)
  - Dilcon Community School (Winslow, Arizona)
  - Greyhills Academy High School (Tuba City, Arizona)
  - KinLani Bordertown Dormitory (Flagstaff, Arizona)
  - Leupp Schools, Inc. (Winslow, Arizona)
  - Little Singer Community School (6 miles (9.7 km) southeast of Birdsprings, Arizona, with a Winslow postal address)
  - Naa Tsis'aan Community School (Tonalea, Arizona)
  - Richfield Residential Hall (Richfield, Utah)
  - Shonto Preparatory School (Shonto, Arizona)
- Crownpoint, New Mexico Resource Center:
  - Alamo Navajo Community School (Alamo, New Mexico, with a Magdalena postal address)
  - Ch'ooshgai Community School (Tohatchi, New Mexico)
  - Dibe Yazhi Habitiin Olta' Inc. (Borrego Pass) (Borrego Pass, New Mexico, with a Cuba, New Mexico address)
  - Na'Neelzhin Ji'Olta (Torreon) (Torreon, Sandoval County, New Mexico, Cuba address)
  - To'hajiilee Day School (Canoncito, New Mexico)
- Shiprock, New Mexico Resource Center:
  - Atsa'Biya'a'zh Community School (Shiprock, New Mexico)
  - Dzilth-Na-O-Dith-Hle Community School (Bloomfield, New Mexico)
  - Hanaa'dli Community School/Dormitory Inc. (Bloomfield, New Mexico)
  - Kinteel Residential Academy (Aztec Dorm) (Aztec, New Mexico)
  - Navajo Preparatory School (Farmington, New Mexico)
  - Shiprock Northwest High School (Shiprock, New Mexico)
  - Shiprock Reservation Dormitory (Shiprock, New Mexico)
- Bloomington, Minnesota Resource Center:
  - Bug-O-Nay-Ge-Shig School (Bena, Minnesota)
  - Circle of Life Academy (White Earth, Minnesota)
  - Circle of Nations (Wahpeton, North Dakota)
  - Fond du Lac Ojibwe School (Cloquet, Minnesota)
  - Hannahville Indian School (Wilson, Michigan)
  - Joseph K. Lumsden Bahweting Anishnabe (Sault Sainte Marie, Michigan)
  - Lac Courte Oreilles Ojibwa School (Hayward, Wisconsin)
  - Menominee Tribal School (Neopit, Wisconsin)
  - Nay-Ah-Shing School (Onamia, Minnesota)
  - Oneida Nation School (Oneida, Wisconsin)
- Rapid City, South Dakota Resource Center:
  - American Horse School (Allen, South Dakota)
  - Crazy Horse School (Wanblee, South Dakota)
  - Little Wound School (Kyle, South Dakota)
  - Loneman Day School (Oglala, South Dakota)
  - Pierre Indian School Learning Center (Pierre, South Dakota)
  - Porcupine Day School (Porcupine, South Dakota)
  - Sicangu Owayawa Oti (Mission, South Dakota)
  - St. Francis Indian School (Saint Francis, South Dakota)
  - St. Stephens Indian School (St. Stephens, Wyoming)
  - Takini School (Howes, South Dakota)
  - Tiospaye Topa School (Ridgeview, South Dakota)
  - Wounded Knee (Manderson, South Dakota)
- Seattle, Washington Resource Center:
  - Chief Leschi Schools (Puyallup, Washington)
  - Coeur d'Alene Tribal School (DeSmet, Idaho)
  - Duckwater Shoshone Elementary School (Duckwater, Nevada)
  - Lummi Nation School (Bellingham, Washington)
  - Muckleshoot Tribal School (Auburn, Washington)
  - Noli Indian School (San Jacinto, California)
  - Northern Cheyenne Tribal School (Busby, Montana)
  - Paschal Sherman Indian School (Omak, Washington)
  - Pyramid Lake Jr./Sr. High School (Nixon, Nevada)
  - Quileute Tribal School (LaPush, Washington)
  - Shoshone Bannock Jr./Sr. High School (Pocatello, Idaho)
  - Two Eagle River School (Pablo, Montana)
  - Wa He Lut Indian School (Olympia, Washington)
  - Yakama Nation Tribal School (Toppenish, Washington)
- Flandreau, South Dakota Resource Center
  - Crow Creek Reservation High School (Stephan, South Dakota)
  - Crow Creek Sioux Tribal Elementary School (Stephan, South Dakota)
  - Enemy Swim School (Waubay, South Dakota)
  - Lower Brule Day School (Lower Brule, South Dakota)
  - Marty Indian School (Marty, South Dakota)
  - Meskwaki Settlement School (Tama, Iowa)
  - Chickasaw Children's Village (Kingston, Oklahoma)
  - Eufala Dormitory (Eufaula, Oklahoma)
  - Jones Academy (Hartshorne, Oklahoma)
  - Kickapoo Nation School (Powhattan, Kansas)
  - Sequoyah High School (Tahlequah, Oklahoma)
  - Tiospa Zina Tribal School (Agency Village, South Dakota)
- Nashville, Tennessee Resource Center
  - Ahfachkee Day School (near Clewiston, Florida)
  - Bogue Chitto Elementary School (Philadelphia, Mississippi)
  - Cherokee Central Elementary School (Cherokee, North Carolina)
  - Cherokee Central High School (Cherokee, North Carolina)
  - Chitimacha Tribal School (Jeanerette, Louisiana)
  - Choctaw Central High School (Choctaw, Mississippi)
  - Choctaw Central Middle School (Choctaw, Mississippi)
  - Conehatta Elementary School (Conehatta, Mississippi)
  - Indian Island School (Indian Island, Maine)
  - Indian Township School (Princeton, Maine)
  - Miccosukee Indian School (near Miami, Florida)
  - Pearl River Elementary School (Choctaw, Mississippi)
  - Red Water Elementary School (Carthage, Mississippi)
  - Sipayik Elementary School (formerly Beatrice Rafferty School, near Perry, Maine)
  - Standing Pine Elementary School (Carthage, Mississippi)
  - Tucker Elementary School (Philadelphia, Mississippi)
- Bismarck, North Dakota Resource Center
  - Mandaree Day School (Mandaree, North Dakota)
  - Rock Creek Grant School (Bullhead, South Dakota)
  - Little Eagle Grant School (Little Eagle, South Dakota) – It was known as Sitting Bull School until 2016.
  - Standing Rock Community School (Fort Yates, North Dakota)
  - Tate Topa Tribal School (Fort Totten, North Dakota)
  - Theodore Jamerson Elementary School (Bismarck, North Dakota)
  - Turtle Mountain High School (Belcourt, North Dakota)
  - Twin Buttes Day School (Halliday, North Dakota)
  - White Shield School (West Roseglen, North Dakota)

==== American Horse School ====
It was established in 1931 as the consolidation of Day School #20 and Day School #21, with the former buildings of those two schools becoming teacher housing. As of 2021 its enrollment is 330. Its service area, in addition to Allen, includes Kyle and Martin, and includes the Lacreek, Pass Creek and Medicine Root Creek districts of the reservation.

In 2015 the Minneapolis Star-Tribune editorial board wrote that American Horse had poor insulation, had too many students relative to building capacity, has tile flooring in poor repair and using asbestos, and "lacks the electrical and communications infrastructure needed to support the technology used in modern education."

==== Chitimacha Tribal School ====
In 1937 a two classroom public school building condemned by the St. Mary Parish School Board was moved to Charenton, and began serving the community as a 1-8 school; the student population went over 60. In 1968 the kindergarten was established. The Bureau of Indian Affairs (BIA) built a new school, which began operations in 1978, to replace the former facility. It had 38 in the 1978-1979 school year, but this went down to 29 in 1980-1981 and 22 in 1981-1982. In 1982 it got a funding cut due to Reaganomics, which led to fears that the school could close.

==== Ch'ooshgai Community School ====
It is in Tohatchi, New Mexico and has boarding facilities. Originally it was known as the Chuska Boarding School.

In the 1960s a new school building, a cafeteria, dormitories, and residences for employees were proposed as a way of relieving the Tohatchi Boarding School. It was established circa 1965.

In 1973 three students ran away from the school and encountered frostbite, leading to a lawsuit.

It had 597 students in 1967. It became the Chuska/Tohatchi Consolidated School in 1985 after the Tohatchi Boarding School was merged into it. The Navajo Nation took control of the school circa 1999. Around that time the school received its current name.

==== Duckwater Shoshone Elementary School ====
A K-8 school, it is in a building on the Duckwater Reservation in Duckwater that previously functioned as a church. The school was established circa 1973 by tribal members who were not satisfied with their children's course in the Nye County School District. The school board was established on July 26 of that year, and it opened on November 26 of that year after the United States Office of Education granted $35,000. In 1975 its student count was 21. In 1982 the school got a renovation. By 1986 the relationship between the county's Duckwater School and Duckwater Shoshone School community had mended. Duckwater Shoshone maintains its own zoological garden.

==== Lukachukai Community School ====
The campus has 44 acres (18 ha) of property and includes a dormitory. In 1976, the seventh grade at Lukachukai ended so that grade was sent to Chinle Boarding School (now Many Farms Community School). In 2015 the school was under-resourced, and the school community made an effort to get a replacement facility. Principal Arthur Ben personally recruited teachers, including some who were previously retired.

==== Na'Neelzhin Ji'Olta School ====
The tribal K-8 school has a Cuba address, but is actually in Torreon. It first opened in 1935. It is also known as the Torreon Day School and Torreon Community School.

==== Theodore Roosevelt School ====
Theodore Roosevelt School (TRS) is a tribally controlled middle school in Fort Apache, Arizona. It includes grades 6-8. It is in the White Mountains and serves the White Mountain Apache Tribe.

The dormitories opened sometime after 1935. A cafeteria opened in 1948. In 1995 it had 100 students. By 1995 conditions at the school had deteriorated to the point where students had to be boarded at ad hoc dormitories as the standard dormitory buildings needed heating repairs and asbestos removal. Additionally the cafeteria was at times unusable; the school took students to a restaurant so they could eat there.

The school has a boarding program for weekdays for students living in the Apache Reservation and in Cibecue, Arizona, while students from other places board for the entire week.

==== To'hajiilee Day School ====
To’hajiilee Day School ranges from grades K-12. In March 2022 the high school building was no longer in use due to foundation problems that resulted from frequent flooding in the area. Melanie Stansbury, a member of the U.S. House of Representatives, criticized the conditions of the school.

==== Wounded Knee District School ====
It is a K-8 school. The school is in proximity to the site of the Wounded Knee massacre. In 2015 the state of its campus was categorized by the BIE as being in a suboptimal state.

== Former facilities ==
Includes the BIE, OIEP, and predecessor agencies:

- Albuquerque Indian School
- Manuelito Hall in Gallup, New Mexico, a dormitory which housed Native American students attending Gallup-McKinley County Schools. In 1973 it had about 300 students, including 12 from Arizona. That year the BIA closed Manuelito Hall, planning to move students to various boarding schools. The public school system's funding was not anticipated to be harmed by this closure. There were some families that wanted their children to remain at Gallup-McKinley schools as they perceived them to be better than BIA schools. The BIA planned to send the Arizonans to Arizona, and of the remaining students: 110 high school students to Wingate High School, 80 elementary students to Crownpoint Boarding School, 45 elementary school students to Wingate Elementary School, and others to Chuska Boarding School and Tohatchi Boarding School.
- Mount Edgecumbe High School in Sitka, Alaska, now operated by the State of Alaska
- Nava Boarding and Day School in Newcomb, New Mexico was established around 1929 and closed in or before 1955.
- Phoenix Indian School
- Eight Mile School District – Public school district that was BIE/OIE-funded from 1987 to 2008; in 2008 the BIE declared that it was not tribally controlled and therefore should never have received BIE funds.

== Directors ==
No.	Image	BIE Director	Affiliation	Term started	Term ended	Refs.
acting		Kevin Skenandore	Oneida and Oglala Lakota	August 2007	February 1, 2010	
acting		Bartholomew "Bart" Stevens	San Carlos Apache	February 2, 2010	May 31, 2010	
2		Keith O. Moore	Rosebud Sioux	June 1, 2010	June 30, 2012	
acting		Brian Drapeaux	Yankton Sioux	July 1, 2012	February 2013	
acting		Charles M. Roessel	Navajo	February 2013	December 11, 2013	
3		Charles M. Roessel	Navajo	December 11, 2013	March 30 2016	
interim		Ann Marie Bledsoe Downes	Winnebago	March 30, 2016	November 2, 2016	
4		Tony Dearman	Cherokee	November 2, 2016	present	

== See also ==
- Bureau of Indian Affairs
- Charles Monty Roessel
