= Magdalena Municipal Schools =

School district in New Mexico, USA

Location
- 200 Duggins Drive; Magdalena, New Mexico 87825; United States

District information
- Type: Public school district
- Grades: Pre-K to 12
- Schools: 3 (Elementary, Middle, High)

Students and staff
- Students: ~291
- District mascot: Steers

Other information
- Website: magschools.us

Magdalena Municipal Schools is a school district headquartered in Magdalena, New Mexico. It covers Magdalena and Alamo. It consists of an elementary school, a middle school, and a high school.

In the 1950s American Indian children living in Alamo, previously attending distant boarding schools, began attending Magdalena schools after the Bureau of Indian Affairs (BIA) had a dormitory built in Magdalena in 1957. In 1979 the Alamo Navajo Community School opened in Alamo, drawing Alamo students away from Magdalena schools.

In 2020, during the COVID-19 pandemic in New Mexico, the administration decided to do virtual learning until at least Labor Day.
