= Turtle Mountain Indian Reservation =

Indian Reservation in northern North Dakota

Coordinates: 48°51′00″N 99°47′01″W

Turtle Mountain Indian Reservation (Ojibwe: Mikinaakwajiwing) is a reservation located in northern North Dakota, United States. It is the land base for the Turtle Mountain Band of Chippewa Indians. The population of the Turtle Mountain Indian Reservation consists of Plains Ojibwe (also known in the US as Chippewa) and Métis peoples; the reservation was established in 1882.

== Reservation ==
Location of the main reservation

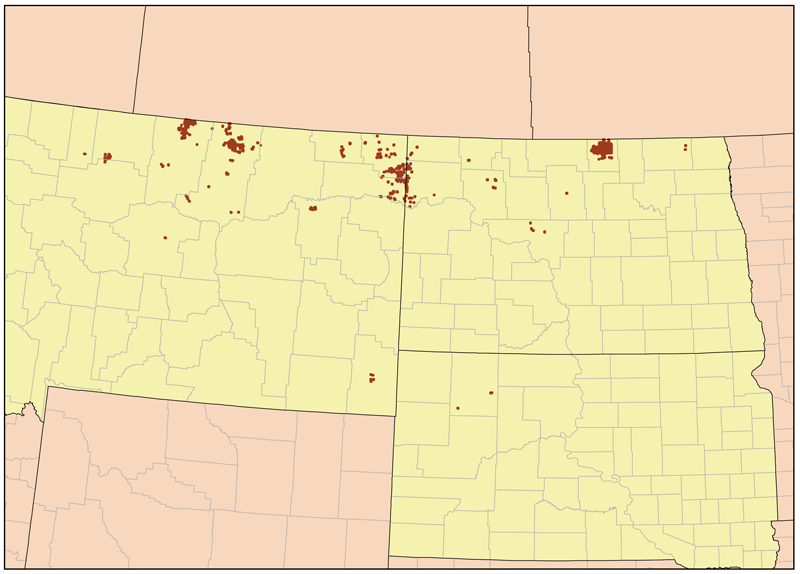
Map of the Turtle Mountain reservation and trust lands.

The main reservation is located in Rolette County, North Dakota. The reservation is six by twelve miles (9.7 km × 19.3 km), and it has one of the highest population densities of any reservation in the United States. It has a land area of 67.583 square miles (175.04 km^{2}) and a 2016 estimated population of 6,369 persons. It also has extensive off-reservation trust lands, which make the reservation's lands the most widely dispersed of all reservations in the nation.

These lands are spread across 22 counties in three states: North Dakota, Montana, and South Dakota. Including these lands, the reservation's land area is a total of 233.036 square miles (603.56 km^{2}). Its total resident population at the 2000 census was 8,331.

The largest portion of off-reservation trust land is located in Rolette County, with significant parcels in Phillips, Blaine, Sheridan, and Roosevelt counties in Montana; and in Williams County, North Dakota. Sixteen other counties have lesser amounts of trust land.

The main part of the Turtle Mountain Reservation is located in Rolette County, North Dakota. It covers 72 square miles (46,000 acres; 19,000 ha). Another 26,175 acres (10,593 ha) is located in Rolette County, North Dakota, around the Turtle Mountain Reservation. Total acres in Rolette County are 72,255 acres (29,241 ha). Another 6,698 acres (2,711 ha) is managed by the Trenton Agency. Much of the Trenton land is in Montana. The remaining land, totaling 67,852 acres (27,459 ha), is located primarily in Montana, with small parcels in North Dakota and South Dakota. It is one of a few Native American reservations that protected its lands against white settlement. The total area of the Turtle Mountain Reservation is 146,805 acres (229.383 sq mi; 59,410 ha).

== Geography ==
The Turtle Mountains range along what is now the Manitoba and North Dakota border. They consist of a vast spreading of hills, wetlands, and plateaus situated along the border, and are where the Turtle Mountain Indian Reservation is located. The American portion of the plateau is not as extensively covered by a forest as in the Canadian part of the plateau. The forest that covers the plateau is clear evidence that the boreal forest extended much further westward. It is only slightly higher in elevation than the neighboring prairie, about 500 feet (150 m) or more, though there are several prominent points, including Boundary Butte on the plateau's western edge with over 1,000 feet (300 m) of prominence. Many lakes dot the plateau, which is evidence that the area was covered by a large lake in ancient times.

== History ==
In the early 19th century (around 1810–1820), Ojibwe and Metis warriors battled with white fur trade companies over sensitive issues. These issues included whites trespassing on Indian land and disagreements over the lucrative pemmican. Pemmican was vital to both the Ojibwe and to the white fur trade companies. The Pemmican War was fought over the lucrative pemmican trade. The Battle of Seven Oaks was the major battle of the war.

Historians claim the Ojibwe still controlled nearly 10 million acres (4,000,000 ha; 16,000 mi^{2}) in 1892. In the late 1880s, the United States sent representatives to chief Little Shell III and his councilors, to negotiate a deal for the acreage still owned by them. Chief Little Shell III was living in Montana and was not pleased about the issue. The negotiations continued on for several years and finally ended in 1891, when the United States selected 32 Ojibwe leaders to negotiate and sign the McCumber Agreement. That occurred in 1892.

In 1882, the Turtle Mountain Reservation was established; it was originally much larger than today. In 1884, by executive order of Chester A. Arthur, the United States reduced the size of the Turtle Mountain Reservation to two townships or 46,080 acres (18,650 ha). The Ojibwe ceded much of their land before the reservation was established.

Chief Little Shell III ceded the land in exchange for a large reservation that bordered the Fort Peck Reservation in Montana. During the negotiations over the 10 million acres in the early 1890s, the Ojibwe leader and the United States government could not come to agreement. The United States forced chief Little Shell III and several hundred of his supporters off the reservation rolls, making them landless.

Throughout the mid-1860s, the bison population experienced a decline. Bison were a crucial resource for Métis populations, being important in the ways of life and the economy, as it was often sold and traded. This decline in bison numbers negatively impacted the Métis of Turtle Mountain. Many Plains Ojibwa moved to Turtle Mountain in the eighteenth century. This caused tensions between Métis and Plains Ojibwa, as they had to share these lands. Differences in histories and relations sparked tensions between the two groups. Although having tensions in some areas, Plains Ojibwa and Métis shared similar political goals for the future such as the goal to create a reservation that would be federally recognized and gaining recognition, on a federal level, of a political identity. In February 1876, a document written by the Chippewa Indians of Turtle Mountain was signed by Little Shell III. This addressed the three points in political discussions with the federal government. These included the establishment of a reservation, the request to be politically recognized and the ability to sell land. As the resources available on the land were diminishing as a result of settler encroachment, the population of Turtle Mountain wanted the option to sell land. The year 1876 saw the implementation of a bill that would create a reservation for the lands claimed by Métis and Ojibwa. By 1882, there was increasing violence between the people of Turtle Mountain and white settlers, as settlers continued to encroach on Turtle Mountain. The United States federal government began interfering with the lives of the population of Turtle Mountain and forced them to pay federal taxes.

In March 1884, President of the United States Chester Arthur reduced the size of the reservation to six by twelve miles. It still has these same dimensions today. This reduction was a 90 percent decrease in the size of the land, causing dissent among the people of Turtle Mountain. Through sentiments of disappointment due to the large reduction of land size, Metis and Plains Ojibwa were brought together, however still had some divisions in goals.

In 1892, discussion by the United States federal government led to the political assimilation of Plains Ojibwa and Métis; they were now seen as one political group. They remained two distinct groups towards each other despite the federal government's decision. As a result of the Northwest resistance, many Métis of Saskatchewan went to Turtle Mountain to stay with relatives, increasing both numbers and tensions on the reservation. Those living on the reservation did not have adequate space and the overcrowding caused a faster decline in the resources available on the land, resulting in deaths due to starvation and disease. Harsh climates on the reservation made the living conditions very difficult. Cold winters and dry summers made agriculture very difficult and the numbers of bison declined rapidly. This reduction of available resources caused further tension between Métis and plains Ojibwa.

=== McCumber Agreement ===
In 1904, an agreement was put into effect between the Turtle Mountain Band of Chippewa Indians and the government of the United States. This became the McCumber Agreement and was signed by the Turtle Mountain Band of Chippewa Indians in 1905. The McCumber Agreement stated that the people of Turtle Mountain would sell the land of the reservation of a price of $1 million. As this was not considered to be a great deal of money, it was also named the "Ten Cent Treaty". There was much resistance from the people of Turtle Mountain towards the implementation of this agreement. Little Shell III was the leader of the Plains Ojibwe, but his authority was diminishing, as he was unable to address all of the issues that were occurring in the community stemming from the agreement. Little Shell III had a large presence in the resistance of the agreement, which lessened somewhat following his death in 1900. In 1920, the population of Turtle Mountain formed a committee to sue the United States for the failures of the McCumber Agreement. According to the committee, the federal government took 10 million acres of land at 10 cents per acre and created a reservation with diminishing resources, with no improvements being made to crowded living conditions, starvation, poverty, and disease.

=== Selkirk Concession ===
In 1811, the Selkirk Concession was issued by the Hudson's Bay Company to Thomas Douglas, 5th Earl of Selkirk. It covered a large area of land in central Canada and northern United States including parts of eastern Saskatchewan, southern Manitoba, northwestern Ontario, northern Minnesota, eastern North Dakota, and northeastern South Dakota. The Turtle Mountains were within the land area of the Selkirk Concession.

=== Constitution ===
In 1932, a tribal constitution was implemented on Turtle Mountain, 27 years after the signing of the McCumber Agreement. The people of Turtle Mountain were informed that the implementation of this constitution would make their claims clear to the federal government. The constitution ended up giving much power to the United States federal government. As a result of this, the constitution was not accepted by the Turtle Mountain Band of Chippewa Indians, as in their view it did not respect the community. In 1934, the Turtle Mountain Band of Chippewa Indians were against the establishment of a new constitution by the Indian Reorganization Act. The Indian Reorganization Act was still passed in 1934, two years after the establishment of the constitution, claim that its goals were to reestablish tribal governments.

The population of Turtle Mountain is still governed by the 1932 constitution. This constitution was deemed ineffective and not compliant with the needs of the people of Turtle Mountain. In 1946, claims were filed with the Indian Claims Commission, and despite the slow process, the people of Turtle Mountain won a claim surrounding the impacts they faced as a result of the McCumber Agreement. Despite this, poor living conditions on the reservation persisted and the average household income on the reservation remained far below that of the rest of North Dakota. A vote in 2002 rejected a new constitution, and another vote the following year in 2003 resulted in an even greater rejection of a new constitution.

== Trenton Indian Service Area ==
An agency of the Turtle Mountain Reservation, the Trenton Indian Service Area was established in the 1970s to manage the Chippewa land allotments in northeastern Montana and northwestern North Dakota. Only one community is affiliated with the Trenton Indian Service Area and that is Trenton, North Dakota. Around 500 people live in Trenton, which is an unincorporated community. Trenton is only a few miles from Montana. The Trenton Indian Service Area does not manage all the Turtle Mountain Chippewa land allotments. Fort Peck Agency manages some, as does the Fort Belknap Agency, Northern Cheyenne Agency, and the Cheyenne River Agency of South Dakota.

== Communities ==
Several Chippewa settlements are located on and around the small reservation. East Dunseith is located on the plateau, surrounded by forest and many lakes. Shell Valley is located in the extreme southwestern part of the reservation. Like East Dunseith, Shell Valley is located on off-reservation trust land. Belcourt is situated on the southeastern edge of the plateau, with forest to the east, north and west of the CDP. Many lakes are also located around Belcourt.

Dunseith is not on the reservation but is also predominantly Indian, even moreso than St. John. Just east of Belcourt is an area formerly known as Turtleville that had over 100 housing units in 1997, though most if not all of these were eventually torn down. More than 70 housing units were subsequently rebuilt as Kent's Addition, named after Senator Kent Conrad, who helped gain funding for the housing project.

Directly south of Kent's Addition is another area where a large number of housing units are located called Green Acres Housing. The area has around 33 housing units.

East Dunseith Housing (not to be confused with East Dunseith) may have up to 80 housing units. East Dunseith Housing is just under a mile east of Dunseith. The population of East Dunseith may be between 240 and 320.

- Belcourt, North Dakota
- East Dunseith, North Dakota
- East Dunseith Housing, North Dakota
- Green Acres, North Dakota
- Kent's Addition
- Shell Valley, North Dakota (most, population 395)

=== Grahams Island ===
Grahams Island is a part of the Turtle Mountain Reservation. It lies some 60 miles (97 km) from the Turtle Mountain Reservation, but much of the island was allotted to Turtle Mountain Chippewas. The island is located on the north side of Devils Lake near the Spirit Lake Indian Reservation. Much of the island is covered by forest. The island was the location of Chief Little Shell I's village in the very early 1800s. Other Turtle Mountain land allotments are located in Liberty County, Montana, west of the Rocky Boy Reservation and 47 miles (76 km) from the Blackfeet Reservation.

== Economy ==
Turtle Mountain Reservation economic conditions are largely centered on government. The government of the Turtle Mountain Reservation employs 854 people. The government jobs include federal, state, and local agencies, as well as schools on the reservation. The reservation government also owns the Turtle Mountain Manufacturing Company, which has an employment force of 186. Another tribally owned company is Uniband, who employs 350 people in the Belcourt region. Other large employers on the Turtle Mountain Reservation include Indian Health Service employing 215 people, and the Turtle Mountain College employing 60 people. The local tribal casino, owned by the Turtle Mountain Reservation government, has a workforce of 300 people.

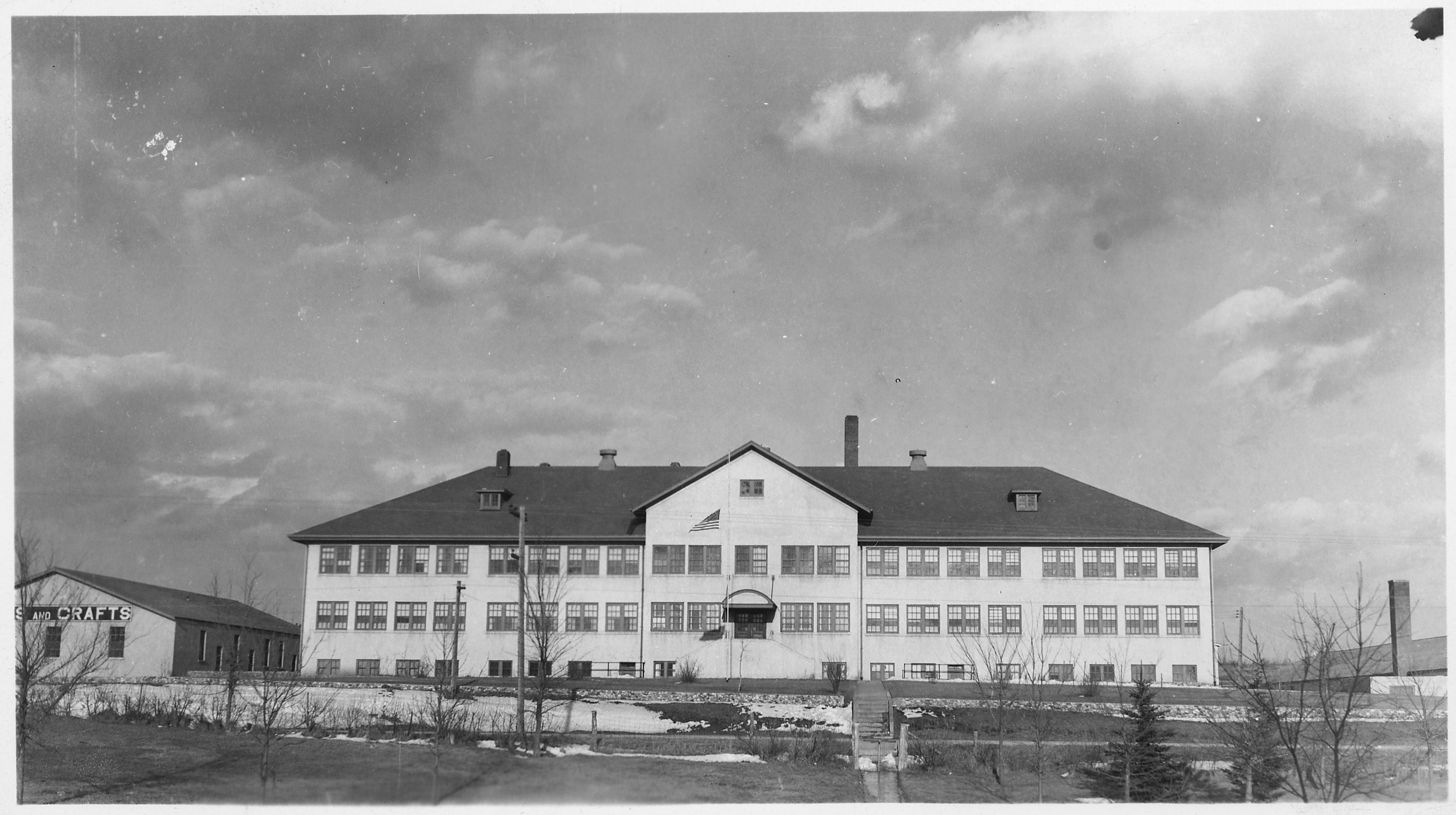
Day school in 1945

In the private sector, it is estimated that there are at least 135 Indian-owned businesses on and around the Turtle Mountain Reservation. According to the 2000 census, 8,331 people were living on the Turtle Mountain Reservation with an unemployment rate near 50 percent. The estimated 2000 employment force was 5,222, with 2,748 employed and 2,474 unemployed. The per capita annual income was near $12,000, and the poverty rate was at 38%.

According to the Bureau of Indian Affairs, the unemployment rate of the Turtle Mountain Reservation in 2010 was 69.25 percent. In that same year, approximately 40 percent of families living on the reservation were living below the poverty line. Due to a difficult local labor market, many families had issues relocating from the reservation into nearby cities, resulting in the eventual return of 45 percent of those leaving the reservation.

== Culture ==
A herd of 70 bison can be seen on the reservation along Highway 281. A white buffalo, which has a lot of significance for the Native Americans, was gifted to the tribe in April 2021. The tribe welcomed the birth of a white buffalo calf in June 2022 as it signified a sign of hope that their prayers were being answered.

In the 21st century, Michif was spoken by some 800 individuals on Turtle Mountain Reservation and in scattered locations in Canada.

== Education ==
Belcourt School District (Turtle Mountain Community School) is the local school district, jointly operated with the Bureau of Indian Education (BIE).

== Climate ==
Climate conditions on the Turtle Mountain Reservation are extreme. Winters are long and cold. Average winter lows at Belcourt during December, January, and February are −4, −11, and −6 °F (−20, −24, and −21 °C). Average high temperatures for the same months are 16, 11, and 17 °F (−9, −12, and −8 °C). Summers are short and warm, with average high temperatures for June, July, and August at Belcourt of 72, 78, and 76 °F (22, 26, and 24 °C). Average summer low temperatures are relatively cool at Belcourt; the average low temperatures for June, July, and August are 47, 52, and 48 °F (8, 11, and 9 °C). Average precipitation at Belcourt is near 18 inches (46 cm).

Climate data for Turtle Mountain Indian Reservation (Belcourt, North Dakota) 1991–2020 normals, extremes 1945–present
Month	Jan	Feb	Mar	Apr	May	Jun	Jul	Aug	Sep	Oct	Nov	Dec	Year
Record high °F (°C)	56 (13)	54 (12)	74 (23)	95 (35)	95 (35)	105 (41)	101 (38)	101 (38)	97 (36)	90 (32)	71 (22)	53 (12)	105 (41)
Mean daily maximum °F (°C)	17.9 (−7.8)	22.1 (−5.5)	33.8 (1.0)	50.4 (10.2)	64.0 (17.8)	72.9 (22.7)	79.1 (26.2)	78.8 (26.0)	68.6 (20.3)	52.8 (11.6)	35.0 (1.7)	21.5 (−5.8)	49.7 (9.8)
Daily mean °F (°C)	6.4 (−14.2)	10.0 (−12.2)	22.8 (−5.1)	38.4 (3.6)	51.8 (11.0)	61.6 (16.4)	67.2 (19.6)	65.8 (18.8)	55.6 (13.1)	41.3 (5.2)	25.3 (−3.7)	11.9 (−11.2)	38.2 (3.4)
Mean daily minimum °F (°C)	−5.1 (−20.6)	−2.1 (−18.9)	11.8 (−11.2)	26.3 (−3.2)	39.5 (4.2)	50.3 (10.2)	55.4 (13.0)	52.8 (11.6)	42.6 (5.9)	29.8 (−1.2)	15.5 (−9.2)	2.4 (−16.4)	26.6 (−3.0)
Record low °F (°C)	−44 (−42)	−50 (−46)	−43 (−42)	−22 (−30)	3 (−16)	18 (−8)	32 (0)	27 (−3)	12 (−11)	−11 (−24)	−37 (−38)	−42 (−41)	−50 (−46)
Average precipitation inches (mm)	0.42 (11)	0.48 (12)	0.80 (20)	0.92 (23)	2.85 (72)	4.04 (103)	2.77 (70)	2.58 (66)	1.74 (44)	2.25 (57)	0.84 (21)	0.45 (11)	20.14 (512)
Source: NOAA

== Notable Turtle Mountain Chippewa and reservation residents ==
- Thomas Little Shell, resisted the McCumber agreement and was leader of Plains Ojibwe. He left his Montana home and moved to the Turtle Mountain Reservation. He died and was buried there in 1901.
- Kade Ferris (1969–2023), Turtle Mountain tribal historic preservation officer
- Leonard Peltier, a leader of the American Indian Movement, grew up on the reservation and returned after his 2025 release from prison
- Louise Erdrich, writer, grew up on Turtle Mountain Reservation, and is an enrolled member of the Turtle Mountain Band of Chippewa Indians.
- William Jennings Gardner, an American football player, coach, and a law enforcement agent.
