= Alamo Navajo Airport =

Alamo Navajo Airport Tʼiistsohdi chidí naatʼaʼí ńdinibįįhígi (Navajo)
- IATA: none; ICAO: none; FAA LID: 3N9

Summary
- Airport type: Public
- Owner: Alamo Navajo (Navajo Nation)
- Serves: Alamo, New Mexico
- Elevation AMSL: 6,460 ft / 1,969 m
- Coordinates: 34°21′46″N 107°29′44″W
- Interactive map of Alamo Navajo Airport

Runways
Direction	Length		Surface
Direction	ft	m	Surface
17/35	3,650	1,113	Dirt
- Source: Federal Aviation Administration

Alamo Navajo Airport (FAA LID: 3N9) is a public use airport located three nautical miles (6 km) south of the central business district of Alamo, in Socorro County, New Mexico, United States. It is owned by the Alamo Navajo branch of the Navajo Nation.

== Facilities ==
Alamo Navajo Airport covers an area of 5 acres (2.0 ha) at an elevation of 6,460 feet (1,969 m) above mean sea level. It has one runway designated 17/35 with a dirt surface measuring 3,650 by 40 feet (1,113 x 12 m).
