= Isleta Elementary School =

Bureau of Indian Education school in Isleta Pueblo, New Mexico

Coordinates: 34°53′52″N 106°43′24″W

Location
- 1000 Moonlight Drive

Information
- Established: 1890s
- School district: Bureau of Indian Education
- Principal: Mikela Romero
- Enrollment: 260 (2005)
- Mascot: Eagle
- Website: ies.bie.edu

Isleta Elementary School is a Bureau of Indian Education-operated elementary school in Isleta Pueblo, New Mexico.

It is located on a property that has 10 acres (4.0 ha) of land. The school's mascot is the eagle.

== History ==
The school began operations in the 1890s.

Circa 1932, a main building opened. In later years there were 13 portable buildings added. In 2002 the student count was 262. In 2005 the student count was 260. By that year, the previous facility had maintenance issues and suffered difficulties from vibrations generated by a nearby train line. Maryann Apodaca y Silva, the then-principal, stated that the train interfered with students' abilities to do classwork.

Groundbreaking for the current facility, which was scheduled to be about 70,000 square feet (6,500 m^{2}) of space, began in 2005. The current facility opened in 2006, and had a cost of $10,500,000, with the Bureau of Indian Affairs (BIA) supplying most of the funds used to pay for it.

In years prior to 2015, the administration and teachers had significant turnover, so some parents chose to send their children elsewhere.

In 2015 the BIE had plans to give the school to tribal control on July 1 of that year. The tribe took control of the school in 2015.

== Curriculum ==
The curriculum includes content about the culture of the Tiwa people and the Tiwa language. Post 2015, Tiwa instruction and culture were scheduled to be done every day.

In 1994 the school had a "Creativity Abounds Program" for students who are gifted in mathematics, language arts, and/or fine arts.
