= Eight Mile School District =

School district in Trenton, North Dakota

Address
- 203 1st Street E Trenton, North Dakota, 58853; United States

District information
- Type: Public
- Grades: PreK–12
- NCES District ID: 3806010

Students and staff
- Students: 312
- Teachers: 21.68
- Staff: 16.45
- Student–teacher ratio: 14.39

Other information
- Website: www.trenton.k12.nd.us

Eight Mile School District #6 is a school district headquartered in Trenton, North Dakota. It operates one K-12 school, Trenton School.

It is entirely in Williams County.

== Status ==
From 1987 to 2008 the Bureau of Indian Education (BIE) and its predecessor agency, the Office of Indian Education (OIE) of the Bureau of Indian Affairs (BIA), funded the school district, with, in 2008, it making up about $1.333 million in revenue, or one third of the district's revenue. In 2008 the BIE ruled that as the school district is not controlled by a Native American tribe, it accordingly should no longer receive BIE funding, and that it should never have gotten BIE money to begin with. As a result, the district chose not to renew contracts of 12 certified employees.

The North Dakota Department of Indian Affairs still lists it as a tribal school.

== Operations ==
In March 2020 the district applied to have instructional weeks of four days each instead of five days. In April 2020, Kirsten Baesler, the state superintendent of education, asked for further information from Eight Mile, and approved Eight Mile later in the month. The district hoped to have better school attendance figures and to give students time for makeup work and professional development for teachers.

== Student body ==
In 1999 the school had 189 students. In 2003 it had 242 students, something Daryl Flagen, the elementary school principal and federal program coordinator, credited to academic performance in the district.

In 2020 the district had 290 students.

== Academic performance ==
In 2003 the OIE, the parent agency of what became the BIE, ranked the school as "outstanding" due to its performance on standardized tests. Around that period 77% of people graduating went on to tertiary education or other means of further education.
