= East Dunseith, North Dakota =

- CDP
- Location of East Dunseith, North Dakota
- Coordinates: 48°51′17″N 100°01′42″W
- Country: United States
- State: North Dakota
- County: Rolette

Area
  - Total: 5.20 sq mi (13.48 km^{2})
  - Land: 5.13 sq mi (13.28 km^{2})
  - Water: 0.077 sq mi (0.20 km^{2})
- Elevation: 2,064 ft (629 m)

Population (2020)
  - Total: 500
  - Density: 97.5/sq mi (37.66/km^{2})
- Time zone: UTC-6 (Central (CST))
  - Summer (DST): UTC-5 (CDT)
- Area code: 701
- FIPS code: 38-21520
- GNIS feature ID: 2392984

East Dunseith is a census-designated place (CDP) in Rolette County, North Dakota, United States. The population was 500 at the 2020 census.

== Geography ==
According to the United States Census Bureau, the CDP has a total area of 5.2 square miles (13 km^{2}), of which 5.1 square miles (13 km^{2}) is land and 0.1 square miles (0.26 km^{2}) (1.52%) is water.

== Demographics ==
Historical population
Census	Pop.	Note	%±
1990	260		—
2000	219		−15.8%
2010	500		128.3%
2020	500		0.0%
U.S. Decennial Census; 2020 Census

As of the census of 2000, there were 219 people, 59 households, and 50 families residing in the CDP. The population density was 181.7 inhabitants per square mile (70.2/km^{2}). There were 60 housing units at an average density of 49.8/sq mi (19.3/km^{2}). The racial makeup of the CDP was 3.20% White and 96.80% Native American. Hispanic or Latino of any race were 1.37% of the population.

There were 59 households, out of which 67.8% had children under the age of 18 living with them, 23.7% were married couples living together, 55.9% had a female householder with no husband present, and 13.6% were non-families. 10.2% of all households were made up of individuals, and 1.7% had someone living alone who was 65 years of age or older. The average household size was 3.71 and the average family size was 3.80.

In the CDP, the population was spread out, with 53.0% under the age of 18, 9.1% from 18 to 24, 27.9% from 25 to 44, 8.7% from 45 to 64, and 1.4% who were 65 years of age or older. The median age was 16 years. For every 100 females, there were 85.6 males. For every 100 females age 18 and over, there were 60.9 males.

The median income for a household in the CDP was $8,667, and the median income for a family was $7,083. Males had a median income of $21,250 versus $13,750 for females. The per capita income for the CDP was $3,026. About 85.7% of families and 86.6% of the population were below the poverty line, including 93.6% of those under the age of 18 and 100.0% of those 65 or over.

== See also ==
- Turtle Mountain Indian Reservation
