= Rock Point Community School =

Bureau of Indian Education (BIE) school in Apache County, Arizona

- Tsé Nitsaa Deezʼáhí Diné Biʼóltaʼ (in Navajo)

Location
- PO Box 560, Highway 191; Rock Point, Arizona 86545; United States; 36°43′03″N 109°37′36″W

Information
- School district: Bureau of Indian Education
- CEEB code: 030051
- Grades: K–12
- Enrollment: 277 (2023-2024)
- Colors: Maroon, gold and white
- Mascot: Cougars
- Chief Executive Officer: Deana Dugi
- Website: www.rpcsaz.org

Rock Point Community School (RCPS, Navajo: Tsé Nitsaa Deezʼáhí Diné Biʼóltaʼ) is a school in Rock Point, Arizona. It is directly operated by the Bureau of Indian Education (BIE). It employs some 90–100 faculty members. It is split into elementary (K–6) and secondary (7–12) units which is overlooked by a Chief Executive Officer and their own principals. It offers fully bilingual English and Navajo language education.

As of 2020 it had about 400 students including those from, in addition to Rock Point: Mexican Water, Rough Rock, Round Rock, and Sweetwater.

== History ==
The Bureau of Indian Affairs (BIA) established the school in 1935. The school previously functioned as a boarding school. As of 2021 it only takes day students now.
