= Alamo, New Mexico =

Census-designate place in Socorro County, New Mexico, United States

Alamo Navajo, New Mexico Tʼiistoh (Navajo)
- CDP
- Location of Alamo Navajo, New Mexico

- Location in the United States
- Coordinates: 34°24′33″N 107°30′53″W
- Country: United States
- State: New Mexico
- County: Socorro

Area
  - Total: 39.17 sq mi (101.46 km^{2})
  - Land: 39.17 sq mi (101.46 km^{2})
  - Water: 0 sq mi (0.00 km^{2})
- Elevation: 6,247 ft (1,904 m)

Population (2020)
  - Total: 1,150
  - Density: 29.3/sq mi (11.33/km^{2})
- Time zone: UTC-7 (Mountain (MST))
  - Summer (DST): UTC-6 (MDT)
- Area code: 575
- FIPS code: 35-01710
- GNIS feature ID: 2407708

Alamo (Navajo: Tʼiistoh) is a census-designated place (CDP) in Socorro County, New Mexico, United States. As of the 2020 census, Alamo had a population of 1,150. It is the largest community on the Alamo Navajo Indian Reservation.

== Geography ==
According to the United States Census Bureau, the CDP has a total area of 39.7 square miles (103 km^{2}), all land.

== Demographics ==
Historical population
Census	Pop.	Note	%±
2020	1,150		—
U.S. Decennial Census

Languages (2000)	Percent
Spoke Navajo at home	85.53%
Spoke English at home	14.47%

As of the census of 2000, there were 1,183 people, 256 households, and 229 families residing in the CDP. The population density was 29.8 inhabitants per square mile (11.5/km^{2}). There were 272 housing units at an average density of 6.9 per square mile (2.7/km^{2}). The racial makeup of the CDP was 94.59% Native American, 3.89% White, 0.08% African American, 0.08% Asian, 0.42% from other races, and 0.93% from two or more races. Hispanic or Latino of any race were 4.06% of the population.

There were 256 households, out of which 59.8% had children under the age of 18 living with them, 55.9% were married couples living together, 28.5% had a female householder with no husband present, and 10.5% were non-families. 8.6% of all households were made up of individuals, and 2.7% had someone living alone who was 65 years of age or older. The average household size was 4.62 and the average family size was 4.87.

In the CDP, the population was spread out, with 41.9% under the age of 18, 13.3% from 18 to 24, 27.9% from 25 to 44, 12.2% from 45 to 64, and 4.7% who were 65 years of age or older. The median age was 22 years. For every 100 females, there were 90.5 males. For every 100 females age 18 and over, there were 86.7 males.

The median income for a household in the CDP was $15,347, and the median income for a family was $15,060. Males had a median income of $18,125 versus $17,308 for females. The per capita income for the CDP was $4,039. About 65.9% of families and 69.1% of the population were below the poverty line, including 72.5% of those under age 18 and 62.0% of those age 65 or over.

== Government ==
The Alamo Navajo School Board (ANSB), federally funded, was used as a vehicle to have public works projects without needing to involve the Navajo Nation bureaucracy. Cindy Yurth of the Navajo Times wrote that it is "the de facto government of Alamo".

== Economy ==
By 2012 the ANSB was the only employer in Alamo.

== Education ==
Alamo falls within the Magdalena Municipal Schools which operates schools in Magdalena, New Mexico.

Alamo Navajo Community School is a K-12 Bureau of Indian Education-affiliated tribal school. From 1930 to 1941 a Bureau of Indian Affairs (BIA) operated a school in the community, but after that point students were boarded at distant schools. Students began attending Magdalena Municipal Schools in 1957 after the BIA opened a dormitory facility in that city. Alamo Community Navajo school opened with grades K-8 on October 1, 1979, and with high school added on December 15, 1980.

== See also ==
- List of census-designated places in New Mexico
