= Shell Valley, North Dakota =

- Census-designated place & Unincorporated community
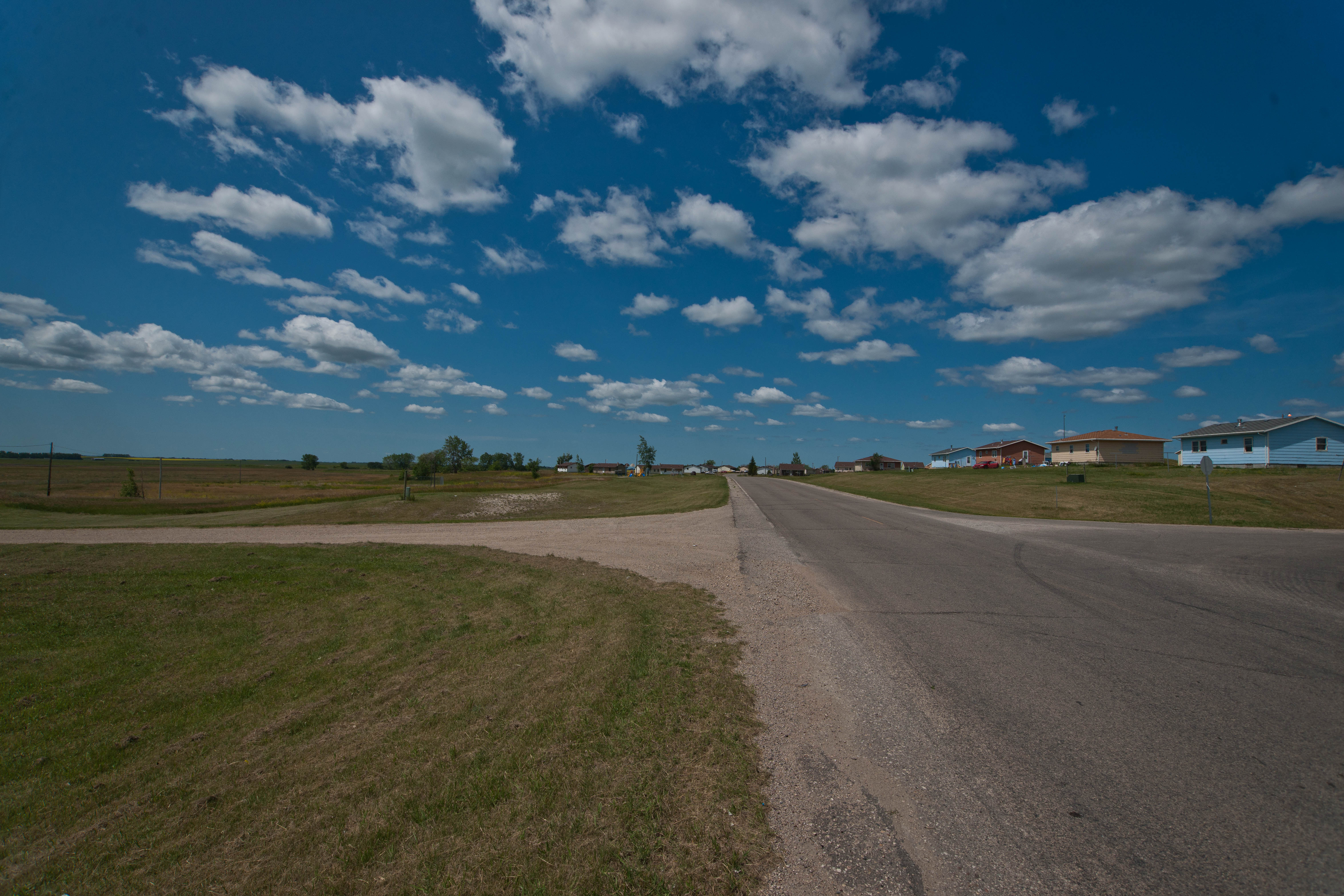
- Street in Shell Valley

- Location of Shell Valley, North Dakota
- Coordinates: 48°47′51″N 99°52′03″W
- Country: United States
- State: North Dakota
- County: Rolette

Area
  - Total: 15.03 sq mi (38.94 km^{2})
  - Land: 15.00 sq mi (38.85 km^{2})
  - Water: 0.035 sq mi (0.09 km^{2})
- Elevation: 1,821 ft (555 m)

Population (2020)
  - Total: 1,146
  - Density: 76/sq mi (29.5/km^{2})
- Time zone: UTC-6 (CST)
  - Summer (DST): UTC-5 (CDT)
- ZIP Code: 58316
- Area code: 701
- FIPS code: 38-72250
- GNIS feature ID: 2393232

Shell Valley is a census-designated place (CDP) in Rolette County, North Dakota, United States. The population was 1,146 at the 2020 census.

The community is partially located on lands of Turtle Mountain Chippewa Tribe.

== Geography ==
According to the United States Census Bureau, the CDP has a total area of 15.0 square miles (39 km^{2}), all land.

== Demographics ==
Historical population
Census	Pop.	Note	%±
1990	343		—
2000	395		15.2%
2010	1,197		203.0%
2020	1,146		−4.3%
U.S. Decennial Census; 2020 Census

=== 2000 census ===
As of the census of 2000, there were 395 people, 100 households, and 93 families residing in the CDP. The population density was 391.6 inhabitants per square mile (151.2/km^{2}). There were 103 housing units at an average density of 102.1/sq mi (39.4/km^{2}). The racial makeup of the CDP was 3.04% White, 96.71% Native American, and 0.25% from two or more races. Hispanic or Latino of any race were 2.03% of the population.

There were 100 households, out of which 78.0% had children under the age of 18 living with them, 34.0% were married couples living together, 44.0% had a female householder with no husband present, and 7.0% were non-families. 7.0% of all households were made up of individuals, and 3.0% had someone living alone who was 65 years of age or older. The average household size was 3.95 and the average family size was 3.98.

In the CDP, the population was spread out, with 51.9% under the age of 18, 13.4% from 18 to 24, 25.6% from 25 to 44, 7.3% from 45 to 64, and 1.8% who were 65 years of age or older. The median age was 17 years. For every 100 females, there were 94.6 males. For every 100 females age 18 and over, there were 75.9 males.

The median income for a household in the CDP was $13,571, and the median income for a family was $14,107. Males had a median income of $21,250 versus $11,500 for females. The per capita income for the CDP was $4,948. About 56.6% of families and 57.0% of the population were below the poverty line, including 57.5% of those under age 18 and 100.0% of those age 65 or over.

== Education ==
The local school district for most of Shell Valley is the Belcourt School District (Turtle Mountain Community School) while a portion is zoned to Rolette Public School District 29.

== See also ==
- Turtle Mountain Indian Reservation
