= Schuchk, Arizona =

- Populated place
- Location within the state of Arizona Schuchk (the United States)
- Coordinates: 32°07′16″N 111°40′59″W
- Country: United States
- State: Arizona
- County: Pima
- Elevation: 2,523 ft (769 m)
- Time zone: UTC-7 (Mountain (MST))
  - Summer (DST): UTC-7 (MST)
- Area code: 520
- FIPS code: 04-64660
- GNIS feature ID: 24594

Schuchk, also known as Santa Rosa, Santa Rosa Ranch, and Schuchk Ka Wuacho Awotam, is a populated place situated in Pima County, Arizona, United States. It has an estimated elevation of 2,523 feet (769 m) above sea level. The name is derived from the Tohono O'odham scuck, which means 'black ones', referring to black hills.
