= Belcourt School District =

School district in North Dakota, United States

Coordinates: 48°50′29.5″N 99°44′22″W

Address
- 1215 William Hardesty Street Belcourt, North Dakota, 58316; United States

District information
- Type: Public
- Grades: PreK–12
- NCES District ID: 3802530

Students and staff
- Students: 1,594
- Teachers: 123.83
- Staff: 220.58
- Student–teacher ratio: 12.87

Other information
- Website: www.belcourt.k12.nd.us

Belcourt School District #7 (BSD#7) is a school district headquartered in Belcourt, North Dakota. In addition to Belcourt, it serves Green Acres, St. John, and almost all of Shell Valley. It is the school district of the Turtle Mountain Indian Reservation.

The district is affiliated with the Bureau of Indian Education (BIE) and has an agreement where the two entities jointly administer the Turtle Mountain Community School (TMCS). The BIE states that it directly operates the elementary and middle school, while the high school is tribally controlled.

== History ==
In fall 1931 a $150,000, 16-classroom, 36,762-square-foot (3,415.3 m^{2}) building was established as a 1-8 school. The district did not yet have the space for a high school, so students had to attend high schools in other area school districts and/or boarding schools. In 1939 the school started the 9th grade, and one grade was added per year until all twelve grades were there in 1942, with the first graduation in 1943.

A high school building was built in 1962, and an elementary building opened in 1972 with a 1974 expansion. When another high school building opened in 1984, the former high school became a middle school. A fire on the morning of October 26, 1984 damaged the elementary and middle school, forcing the school to do half-day schedules to accommodate the students. The school began using previously retired older facilities in January of the following year. In 1989 the repaired middle school reopened. The current high school facility opened in January 2008 after having been built in the latter part of the previous year. In turn the middle school moved into the 1984 high school building and the elementary school occupied the 1962 and 1972-1974 buildings.

In 2020 all members of the school board voted to make Michelle Thomas-Langan the superintendent.

== Campus ==
The current high school building has 123,000 square feet (11,400 m^{2}) of space. The current middle school, which served as the high school from 1984 to January 2008, has 92,000 square feet (8,500 m^{2}) of space. The elementary school uses the 1972-built 67,600-square-foot (6,280 m^{2}) elementary structure as well as the 1962-built 56,503-square-foot (5,249.3 m^{2}) structure, with a capacity of 400 students, which was the high school from 1962 to 1984 and the middle school from 1984 to 2008. The 1972 elementary building had four classrooms for kindergarten and 30 classrooms for other grades. In 1974 two more classrooms for kindergarten were built in an expansion of the 1972 facility.

In 1962 the school held its physical education classes in a multipurpose room, or if not available, in other spaces. The Daily Plainsman of Huron, South Dakota wrote "The Belcourt School [...] illustrates how a good physical fitness program can be carried on with a minimum of facilities."

== Schools ==
- Turtle Mountain Community High School
- Turtle Mountain Community Middle School
- Turtle Mountain Community Elementary School
