= Green Acres, North Dakota =

- Census-designated place
- Location within North Dakota
- Coordinates: 48°50′17″N 99°41′24″W
- Country: United States
- State: North Dakota
- County: Rolette

Area
  - Total: 1.51 sq mi (3.90 km^{2})
  - Land: 1.51 sq mi (3.90 km^{2})
  - Water: 0 sq mi (0.00 km^{2})
- Elevation: 1,923 ft (586 m)

Population (2020)
  - Total: 605
  - Density: 402.0/sq mi (155.21/km^{2})
- Time zone: UTC-6 (CST)
  - Summer (DST): UTC-5 (CDT)
- ZIP Code: 58316
- Area code: 701
- GNIS feature ID: 2584344

Green Acres is a census-designated place in Rolette County, North Dakota, United States. Its population was 605 as of the 2020 census.

== Demographics ==
Historical population
Census	Pop.	Note	%±
1990	177		—
2000	109		−38.4%
2010	575		427.5%
2020	605		5.2%
U.S. Decennial Census; 2020 Census

== Education ==
The local school district is the Belcourt School District (Turtle Mountain Community School).
