= Trenton, North Dakota =

- CDP & Unincorporated community
- Interactive map of Trenton, North Dakota
- Location within North Dakota
- Coordinates: 48.0699°N 103.8432°W
- Country: United States
- State: North Dakota
- County: Williams

Area
  - Total: 1.047 sq mi (2.711 km^{2})
  - Land: 1.047 sq mi (2.711 km^{2})
  - Water: 0 sq mi (0.000 km^{2}) 0.00%
- Elevation: 1,932 ft (589 m)

Population (2020)
  - Total: 488
  - Estimate (2025): 535
  - Density: 466/sq mi (180/km^{2})
- Time zone: UTC–6 (Central (CST))
  - Summer (DST): UTC–5 (CDT)
- ZIP Code: 58853
- Area code: 701
- FIPS code: 38-79460
- GNIS feature ID: 2805291
- Highways: ND 1804

Trenton is a census-designated place (CDP) and unincorporated community in Williams County, North Dakota, United States. The population was 488 as of the 2020 census, and was estimated at 535 in 2025. It is 13 miles (21 km) southwest of Williston.

It was first listed as a CDP prior to the 2020 census. The CDP is in southwestern Williams County, in the surrounding areas of Trenton Township and it is on the east side of Hardscrabble Township. It is on the south side of North Dakota Highway 1804.

== Geography ==
According to the United States Census Bureau, the CDP has a total area of 1.047 square miles (2.71 km^{2}), all land.

== Climate ==
This climatic region is typified by large seasonal temperature differences, with warm to hot (and often humid) summers and cold (sometimes severely cold) winters. According to the Köppen Climate Classification system, Trenton has a semi-arid to humid continental climate, abbreviated "BSk" on climate maps.

== Demographics ==
Historical population
Census	Pop.	Note	%±
2020	488		—
2025 (est.)	535		9.6%
U.S. Decennial Census; 2020 Census

As of the 2024 American Community Survey, there were 135 estimated households in Trenton with an average of 3.01 persons per household. The CDP has a median household income of $107,417. Approximately 1.7% of the CDP's population lives at or below the poverty line. Trenton has an estimated 71.4% employment rate, with 25.4% of the population holding a bachelor's degree or higher and 91.8% holding a high school diploma. There were 178 housing units at an average density of 170.01 per square mile (65.6/km^{2}).

The top five reported languages (people were allowed to report up to two languages, thus the figures will generally add to more than 100%) were English (92.6%), Spanish (0.0%), Indo-European (7.4%), Asian and Pacific Islander (0.0%), and Other (0.0%).

The median age in the CDP was 37.7 years.

Trenton, North Dakota racial and ethnic composition Note: the US Census treats Hispanic/Latino as an ethnic category. This table excludes Latinos from the racial categories and assigns them to a separate category. Hispanics/Latinos may be of any race.
Race	Number	Percent
White alone (NH)	166	34.02%
Black or African American alone (NH)	0	0.00%
Native American or Alaska Native alone (NH)	223	45.70%
Asian alone (NH)	0	0.00%
Pacific Islander alone (NH)	0	0.00%
Other race alone (NH)	1	0.20%
Mixed race or multiracial (NH)	74	15.16%
Hispanic or Latino (any race)	24	4.92%
Total	488	100.00%

=== 2020 census ===
As of the 2020 census, there were 488 people, 188 households, and 116 families residing in the CDP. The population density was 466.09 inhabitants per square mile (179.96/km^{2}). There were 249 housing units at an average density of 237.82 per square mile (91.82/km^{2}). The racial makeup of the CDP was 34.02% White, 0.00% African American, 45.70% Native American, 0.20% Asian, 0.00% Pacific Islander, 0.41% from some other races and 19.67% from two or more races. Hispanic or Latino people of any race were 4.92% of the population.

== Transportation ==
Amtrak’s Empire Builder, which operates between Seattle/Portland and Chicago, passes through the town on BNSF tracks, but makes no stop. The nearest station is located in Williston, 14 miles (23 km) to the northeast.

On Monday, July 29, 2013, An Amtrak Empire Builder train collided with a bulldozer 9 miles (14 km) west of Trenton, killing the operator.

== Education ==
The Eight Mile Public School District 6.

The area is served by the Eight Mile Public School District 6. It operates the Trenton School. In the 2025-26 academic year, the district reported a total of 325 students.
