= Salt River Elementary School =

Tribal school in Arizona, United States

Coordinates: 33.506428°N 111.831333°W

Salt River Elementary School, formerly known as Salt River Indian Day School, is a tribal elementary school located on the Salt River Pima–Maricopa Indian Community reservation in unincorporated Maricopa County, Arizona. It is affiliated with the Bureau of Indian Education. It covers elementary grades.

== History ==
A previous facility, made of adobe, opened circa 1935. In 1989 the school enrolled 153 children. That year, it began enacting the Drug Abuse Resistance Education (DARE) program, the first school for Native Americans to do so.

Sometime before 1995, the school became tribally-run after receiving a grant from the Bureau of Indian Affairs (BIA), which previously operated the school.

In 1989 Keven Ann Willey of The Arizona Republic wrote that the school and the reservation had low profiles, stating, "Indeed most Arizonans don't even know the school, or the [reservation], exists." The school had budget problems, a dropout rate higher than average, and test scores below par.

== Curriculum ==
The school's November lessons focus on Native American culture and thankfulness towards families instead of the Thanksgiving narrative common in American schools.

== Further media ==
- Potts, Erice H. (1952). An In-Service Teacher Education Program for Salt River Indian School. Arizona State University.
  - Seen in: "An In-Service Teacher Education Program for Salt River Indian School". Indian Education, Volumes 153-255. Education Division, U.S. Office of Indian Affairs. pp. RA87-PA7 (249).
