= Rock Point, Arizona =

CDP in Apache County, Arizona

Rock Point, Arizona Tsé Nitsaa Deezʼáhí (Navajo)
- Census-designated place
- Location in Apache County and the state of Arizona

- Location in the United States
- Coordinates: 36°43′10″N 109°37′30″W
- Country: United States
- State: Arizona
- County: Apache

Area
  - Total: 14.18 sq mi (36.72 km^{2})
  - Land: 14.16 sq mi (36.67 km^{2})
  - Water: 0.019 sq mi (0.05 km^{2})
- Elevation: 5,004 ft (1,525 m)

Population (2020)
  - Total: 552
  - Density: 39.0/sq mi (15.05/km^{2})
- Time zone: UTC-7 (MST)
- ZIP code: 86545
- Area code: 928
- FIPS code: 04-60880
- GNIS feature ID: 2409193

Rock Point is a census-designated place (CDP) in Apache County, Arizona, United States. The population was 642 at the 2010 census. Its name is descriptive of the point where Chinle Creek enters high sandstone walls.

== Geography ==
According to the United States Census Bureau, the CDP has a total area of 14.2 square miles (36.7 km^{2}), all land.

== Demographics ==
Historical population
Census	Pop.	Note	%±
2000	724		—
2010	642		−11.3%
2020	552		−14.0%
U.S. Decennial Census

As of the census of 2000, there were 724 people, 168 households, and 150 families living in the CDP. The population density was 52.5 inhabitants per square mile (20.3/km^{2}). There were 229 housing units at an average density of 16.6 per square mile (6.4/km^{2}). The racial makeup of the CDP was 97.8% Native American, 1.7% White, 0.1% from other races, and 0.4% from two or more races. 0.1% of the population were Hispanic or Latino of any race.

There were 168 households, out of which 64.3% had children under the age of 18 living with them, 61.9% were married couples living together, 22.6% had a female householder with no husband present, and 10.7% were non-families. 8.9% of all households were made up of individuals, and 1.8% had someone living alone who was 65 years of age or older. The average household size was 4.31 and the average family size was 4.63.

In the CDP, the age distribution of the population shows 49.0% under the age of 18, 8.4% from 18 to 24, 25.4% from 25 to 44, 13.3% from 45 to 64, and 3.9% who were 65 years of age or older. The median age was 19 years. For every 100 females, there were 94.1 males. For every 100 females age 18 and over, there were 98.4 males.

The median income for a household in the CDP was $25,208, and the median income for a family was $34,500. Males had a median income of $24,671 versus $26,875 for females. The per capita income for the CDP was $8,320. About 33.2% of families and 37.0% of the population were below the poverty line, including 41.6% of those under age 18 and none of those age 65 or over.

== Education ==
Rock Point is a part of the Red Mesa Unified School District. Originally the territory was within the Chinle School District. In July 1983 the Red Mesa Unified School District formed, splitting from the Chinle School District.

In addition the Rock Point Community School , which is operated by the Bureau of Indian Education, is in Rock Point.

Furthermore, Rock Point is home to the Navajo Evangelical Lutheran Mission School which serves local Elementary students.

== See also ==
- List of census-designated places in Arizona
