= Seniors Real Estate Specialist =

The Seniors Real Estate Specialist (SRES) designation is awarded by the SRES Council to Realtors who have successfully completed coursework on the real estate needs of home buyers age 50+.

Distinctive needs, factors, and considerations for this segment of the population include:

- Housing for Older Persons Act (HOPA)
- reverse mortgages
- pensions, 401(k) accounts, and IRA
- Medicare, Medicaid, and Social Security
- mortgage finance and loan schemes and scams

== History ==
- 1997 - created by the Senior Advantage Real Estate Council
- March 2007 - recognized by the National Association of Realtors

== See also ==
- Real estate professional designations
