= Alamo Navajo School Board =

K-12 tribal school in Alamo, New Mexico

Coordinates: 34.4169°N 107.4987°W

Address
- P.O. Box 5907 Aloma, New Mexico, 87825; United States

District information
- Type: Tribal school system affiliated with the Bureau of Indian Education
- Established: 1979
- Superintendent: John Apachito Jr.
- Deputy superintendent(s): Rick J. Padilla
- NCES District ID: 590004600023

Other information
- Website: www.ansbi.org

The Alamo Navajo School Board, Inc. (ANSB) is the entity controlling a K-12 tribal school in Alamo, New Mexico. It is affiliated with the Bureau of Indian Education (BIE). It also maintains a clinic and other public infrastructure in Alamo.

== History ==
Due to the passage of the Indian Self Determination and Education Assistance Act, a local school board was established in 1979.

Alamo Community Navajo school opened with grades K-8 on October 1, 1979. Its initial campus was four portable buildings. The high school was established on December 15, 1980.

By 2012, it was the only employer in Alamo. The school board, federally funded, was used as a vehicle to have public works projects without needing to involve the Navajo Nation bureaucracy. Cindy Yurth of the Navajo Times wrote that it is "the de facto government of Alamo".

In 2018, a group of parents criticized the school board for spending $497,000 on expenses not directly related to education.

In 2018, a group of parents collected 299 signatures on a petition to recall board members under the terms set by the Navajo Election Administration.

In 2019, the federal courts indicted three former board members, accusing them of lying about taking business trips so they could take federal funds.

== Student body ==
In 2022 student enrollment was 293.

== Student achievement ==
In the 2014–2015 school year, as per BIE statistics, 1% of the students were categorized as having proficiency in mathematics. This increased to 3% in the 2015–2016 school year. The percentage of students proficient in English in the 2015–2016 school year was 4%. By 2022, 5% of students were categorized as proficient in math and 8% in reading with 100% of students reported as being on free or reduced lunch.

== See also ==
- Alamo Navajo Indian Reservation
