= Belcourt, North Dakota =

- CDP
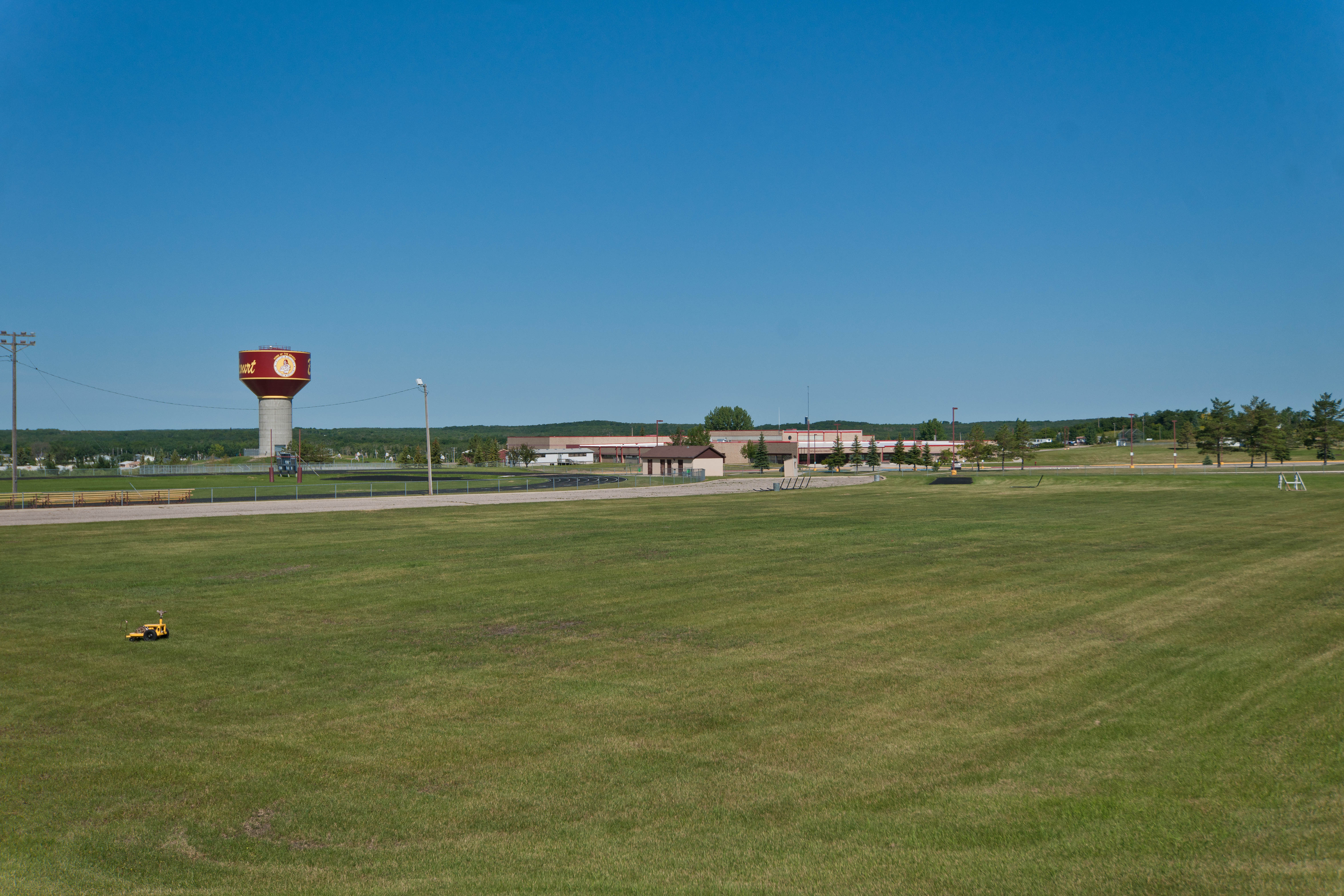
- The Belcourt Water Tower and the Turtle Mountain Middle School (July 2009)
- Interactive map of Belcourt, North Dakota
- Location within North Dakota
- Coordinates: 48.8425°N 99.7442°W
- Country: United States
- State: North Dakota
- County: Rolette
- Founded: 1884
- Named after: Father Belcourt

Area
  - Total: 6.012 sq mi (15.571 km^{2})
  - Land: 5.810 sq mi (15.048 km^{2})
  - Water: 0.202 sq mi (0.522 km^{2}) 3.36%
- Elevation: 1,962 ft (598 m)

Population (2020)
  - Total: 1,510
  - Estimate (2025): 1,687
  - Density: 260/sq mi (100/km^{2})
- Time zone: UTC–6 (Central (CST))
  - Summer (DST): UTC–5 (CDT)
- ZIP Code: 58316
- Area code: 701
- FIPS code: 38-05740
- GNIS feature ID: 2393335

Belcourt is a census-designated place (CDP) in Rolette County, North Dakota, United States. It is within the Turtle Mountain Indian Reservation. The population was 1,510 as of the 2020 census, and was estimated to be 1,687 in 2025.

The community is the seat of the Turtle Mountain Band of Chippewa Indians. Belcourt was originally known as Siipiising, which is Anishinaabe (Chippewa) for "creek that sings with life-giving water." The name refers to what European Americans called "Ox Creek", which flows through the center of town. The town is served by different forms of media, such as KEYA, a tribal radio station that can be found at 88.5 FM; and the Turtle Mountain Times, the tribally owned newspaper that was established in 2003.

== History ==
Belcourt was laid out in 1884. It is named after Father Belcourt. The community was named Belcourt in honour of Georges-Antoine Belcourt. Father Belcourt was a French Canadian Roman Catholic diocesan priest and missionary who served the Chippewa and Métis throughout his ministry in the mid-nineteenth century. Belcourt advocated politically on the behalf of the Anishinaabeg and Métis in Canada and in the United States until 1859. Father Belcourt described the Chippewa historical territory in the Pembina River basin as covering an area about 400 miles from north to south and 500 miles from east to west.

== Geography ==
According to the United States Census Bureau, the CDP has a total area of 6.012 square miles (15.57 km^{2}), of which 5.810 square miles (15.05 km^{2}) is land and 0.202 square miles (0.52 km^{2}) (3.36%) is water.

== Climate ==
This climatic region is typified by large seasonal temperature differences, with warm to hot (and often humid) summers and cold (sometimes severely cold) winters. According to the Köppen Climate Classification system, Belcourt has a humid continental climate, abbreviated "Dfb" on climate maps.

Climate data for Belcourt, North Dakota (1991–2020 normals, extremes 1945–present)
Month	Jan	Feb	Mar	Apr	May	Jun	Jul	Aug	Sep	Oct	Nov	Dec	Year
Record high °F (°C)	56 (13)	54 (12)	74 (23)	95 (35)	95 (35)	105 (41)	101 (38)	101 (38)	97 (36)	90 (32)	71 (22)	53 (12)	105 (41)
Mean daily maximum °F (°C)	17.9 (−7.8)	22.1 (−5.5)	33.8 (1.0)	50.4 (10.2)	64.0 (17.8)	72.9 (22.7)	79.1 (26.2)	78.8 (26.0)	68.6 (20.3)	52.8 (11.6)	35.0 (1.7)	21.5 (−5.8)	49.7 (9.8)
Daily mean °F (°C)	6.4 (−14.2)	10.0 (−12.2)	22.8 (−5.1)	38.4 (3.6)	51.8 (11.0)	61.6 (16.4)	67.2 (19.6)	65.8 (18.8)	55.6 (13.1)	41.3 (5.2)	25.3 (−3.7)	11.9 (−11.2)	38.2 (3.4)
Mean daily minimum °F (°C)	−5.1 (−20.6)	−2.1 (−18.9)	11.8 (−11.2)	26.3 (−3.2)	39.5 (4.2)	50.3 (10.2)	55.4 (13.0)	52.8 (11.6)	42.6 (5.9)	29.8 (−1.2)	15.5 (−9.2)	2.4 (−16.4)	26.6 (−3.0)
Record low °F (°C)	−44 (−42)	−50 (−46)	−43 (−42)	−22 (−30)	3 (−16)	18 (−8)	32 (0)	27 (−3)	12 (−11)	−11 (−24)	−37 (−38)	−42 (−41)	−50 (−46)
Average precipitation inches (mm)	0.42 (11)	0.48 (12)	0.80 (20)	0.92 (23)	2.85 (72)	4.04 (103)	2.77 (70)	2.58 (66)	1.74 (44)	2.25 (57)	0.84 (21)	0.45 (11)	20.14 (512)
Source 1: National Oceanic and Atmospheric Administration
Source 2: National Centers for Environmental Information

== Demographics ==
Historical population
Census	Pop.	Note	%±
1980	1,803		—
1990	2,458		36.3%
2000	2,440		−0.7%
2010	2,078		−14.8%
2020	1,510		−27.3%
2025 (est.)	1,687		11.7%
source: U.S. Decennial Census; 2020 Census

As of the 2024 American Community Survey, there were 489 estimated households in Belcourt with an average of 3.02 persons per household. The CDP has a median household income of $90,568. Approximately 27.7% of the city's population lives at or below the poverty line. Belcourt has an estimated 52.2% employment rate, with 30.6% of the population holding a bachelor's degree or higher and 87.7% holding a high school diploma. There were 617 housing units at an average density of 106.20 per square mile (41.0/km^{2}).

The top five reported languages (people were allowed to report up to two languages, thus the figures will generally add to more than 100%) were English (91.2%), Spanish (0.7%), Indo-European (0.6%), Asian and Pacific Islander (1.8%), and Other (5.7%).

The median age in the CDP was 32.5 years.

Belcourt, North Dakota – racial and ethnic composition Note: the US Census treats Hispanic/Latino as an ethnic category. This table excludes Latinos from the racial categories and assigns them to a separate category. Hispanics/Latinos may be of any race.
Race / ethnicity (NH = non-Hispanic)	Pop. 1990	Pop. 2000	Pop. 2010	Pop. 2020	% 1990	% 2000	% 2010	% 2020
White alone (NH)	133	95	53	116	5.41%	3.89%	2.55%	7.68%
Black or African American alone (NH)	6	3	4	7	0.24%	0.12%	0.19%	0.46%
Native American or Alaska Native alone (NH)	2,305	2,310	1,966	1,343	93.78%	94.67%	94.61%	88.94%
Asian alone (NH)	1	0	3	0	0.04%	0.00%	0.14%	0.00%
Pacific Islander alone (NH)	—	0	0	0	—	0.00%	0.00%	0.00%
Other race alone (NH)	3	2	0	0	0.12%	0.08%	0.00%	0.00%
Mixed race or multiracial (NH)	—	7	23	26	—	0.29%	1.11%	1.72%
Hispanic or Latino (any race)	10	23	29	18	0.41%	0.94%	1.40%	1.19%
Total	2,458	2,440	2,078	1,510	100.00%	100.00%	100.00%	100.00%

=== 2020 census ===
As of the 2020 census, there were 1,510 people, 486 households, 322 families residing in the CDP. The population density was 259.90 inhabitants per square mile (100.3/km^{2}). There were 523 housing units at an average density of 90.02 per square mile (34.8/km^{2}). The racial makeup of the CDP was 7.81% White, 0.46% African American, 89.47% Native American, 0.00% Asian, 0.00% Pacific Islander, 0.00% from some other races and 2.25% from two or more races. Hispanic or Latino people of any race were 1.19% of the population.

=== 2010 census ===
As of the 2010 census, there were 2,078 people, 711 households, and 465 families residing in the CDP. The population density was 357.84 inhabitants per square mile (138.2/km^{2}). There were 783 housing units at an average density of 134.84 per square mile (52.1/km^{2}). The racial makeup of the CDP was 2.65% White, 0.19% African American, 95.81% Native American, 0.14% Asian, 0.00% Pacific Islander, 0.10% from some other races and 1.11% from two or more races. Hispanic or Latino people of any race were 1.40% of the population.

There were 711 households, of which 36.3% had children under the age of 18 living with them, 27.0% were married couples living together, 30.8% had a female householder with no husband present, 7.6% had a male householder with no wife present, and 34.6% were non-families. 30.1% of all households were made up of individuals, and 9.8% had someone living alone who was 65 years of age or older. The average household size was 2.88 and the average family size was 3.54.

The median age in the city was 27.8 years. 35.8% of residents were under the age of 18; 10.8% were between the ages of 18 and 24; 23.6% were from 25 to 44; 21.2% were from 45 to 64; and 8.7% were 65 years of age or older. The gender makeup of the city was 49.3% male and 50.7% female.

=== 2000 census ===
As of the 2000 census, there were 2,440 people, 806 households, and 561 families residing in the CDP. The population density was 417.01 inhabitants per square mile (161.0/km^{2}). There were 856 housing units at an average density of 146.30 per square mile (56.5/km^{2}). The racial makeup of the CDP was 3.93% White, 0.12% African American, 95.41% Native American, 0.00% Asian, 0.00% Pacific Islander, 0.25% from some other races and 0.29% from two or more races. Hispanic or Latino people of any race were 0.94% of the population.

There were 806 households, out of which 46.4% had children under the age of 18 living with them, 27.5% were married couples living together, 33.5% had a female householder with no husband present, and 30.3% were non-families. 24.9% of all households were made up of individuals, and 8.6% had someone living alone who was 65 years of age or older. The average household size was 2.96 and the average family size was 3.54.

In the CDP, the population was spread out, with 38.6% under the age of 18, 12.5% from 18 to 24, 26.1% from 25 to 44, 16.5% from 45 to 64, and 6.2% who were 65 years of age or older. The median age was 24 years. For every 100 females, there were 95.0 males. For every 100 females age 18 and over, there were 88.2 males.

The median income for a household in the CDP was $12,880, and the median income for a family was $15,000. Males had a median income of $23,047 versus $17,292 for females. The per capita income for the CDP was $8,432. About 49.6% of families and 53.9% of the population were below the poverty line, including 65.3% of those under age 18 and 30.6% of those age 65 or over.

== Education ==
The area is served by the Belcourt Public School District 7 (Turtle Mountain Community School). It operates the Belcourt School. In the 2025-26 academic year, the district reported a total of 1,463 students.

== See also ==
- Turtle Mountain Indian Reservation
