= Alamo Navajo Indian Reservation =

Coordinates: 34°24′00″N 107°27′02″W

Alamo (Navajo: Tʼiistsoh) is the non-contiguous southeastern exclave of the Navajo Nation

The Alamo Navajo Indian Reservation (Navajo: Tʼiistsoh) is a non-contiguous section of the Navajo Nation lying in northwestern Socorro County, New Mexico, United States, adjacent to the southeastern part of the Acoma Indian Reservation. It has a land area of 256.616 km^{2} (99.08 sq mi), and a 2000 census resident population of almost 2,000 persons. The Alamo Band of the Navajo Nation Reservation's land area is approximately 0.4% of the Navajo Nation's total area. The remote community has a K-12 school (Alamo Navajo School Board), Early Childhood Center, Wellness Center, a Community Service center that provides school and non-school related programs, a state-of-the-art Health Center and KABR radio, 1500 AM.

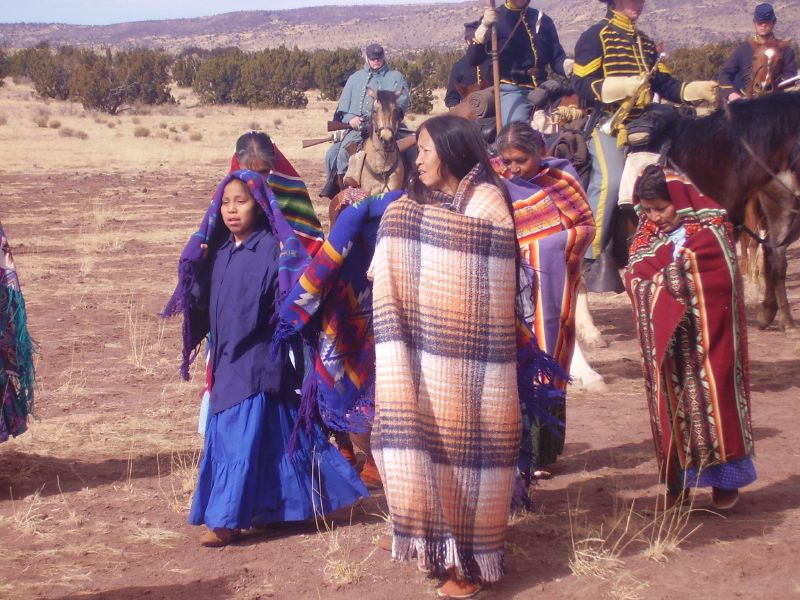
Members of the Alamo Navajo Reservation, in period clothing for historical re-enactment.
