= Havasupai Elementary School =

School in Supai, Arizona, US

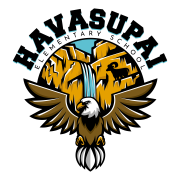

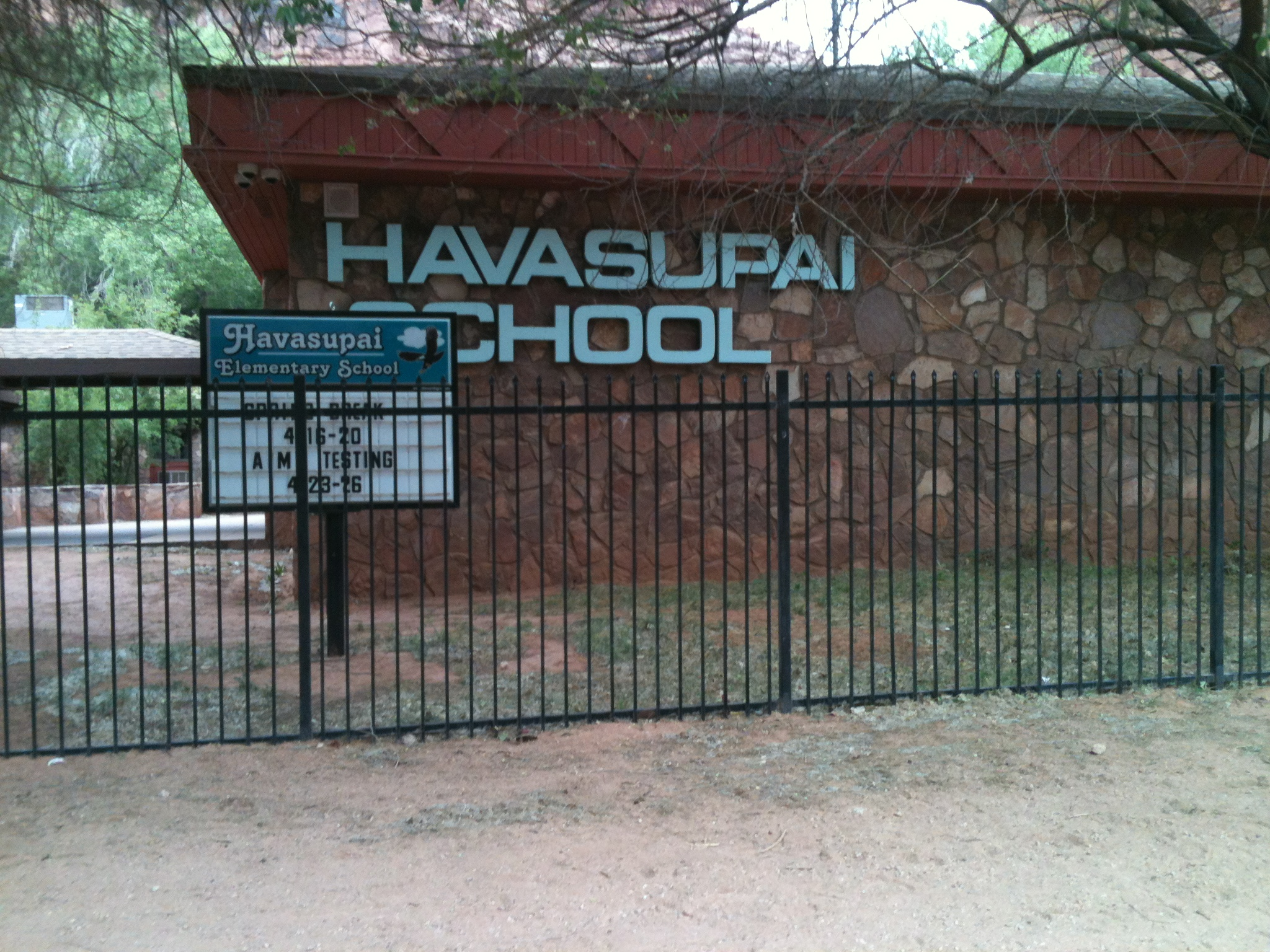
- The school in 2012

Location
- 40 Main St; Supai, Arizona 86435; United States
- Coordinates: 36°14′13″N 112°41′20″W

Information
- School type: Public school (federally operated)
- Established: 1895
- School district: Bureau of Indian Education
- Principal: Hoai-My Winder
- Grades: K–8
- Mascot: Eagle
- Website: hes.bie.edu

Havasupai Elementary School (HES) is a Bureau of Indian Education (BIE)-operated K-8 school in Supai, Arizona. It serves the Havasupai Indian Reservation.

It is also known as Havasupai Indian School, and was formerly Havasupai Boarding and Day School.

The school is located at an altitude of 3,500 feet (1.1 km).

== History ==
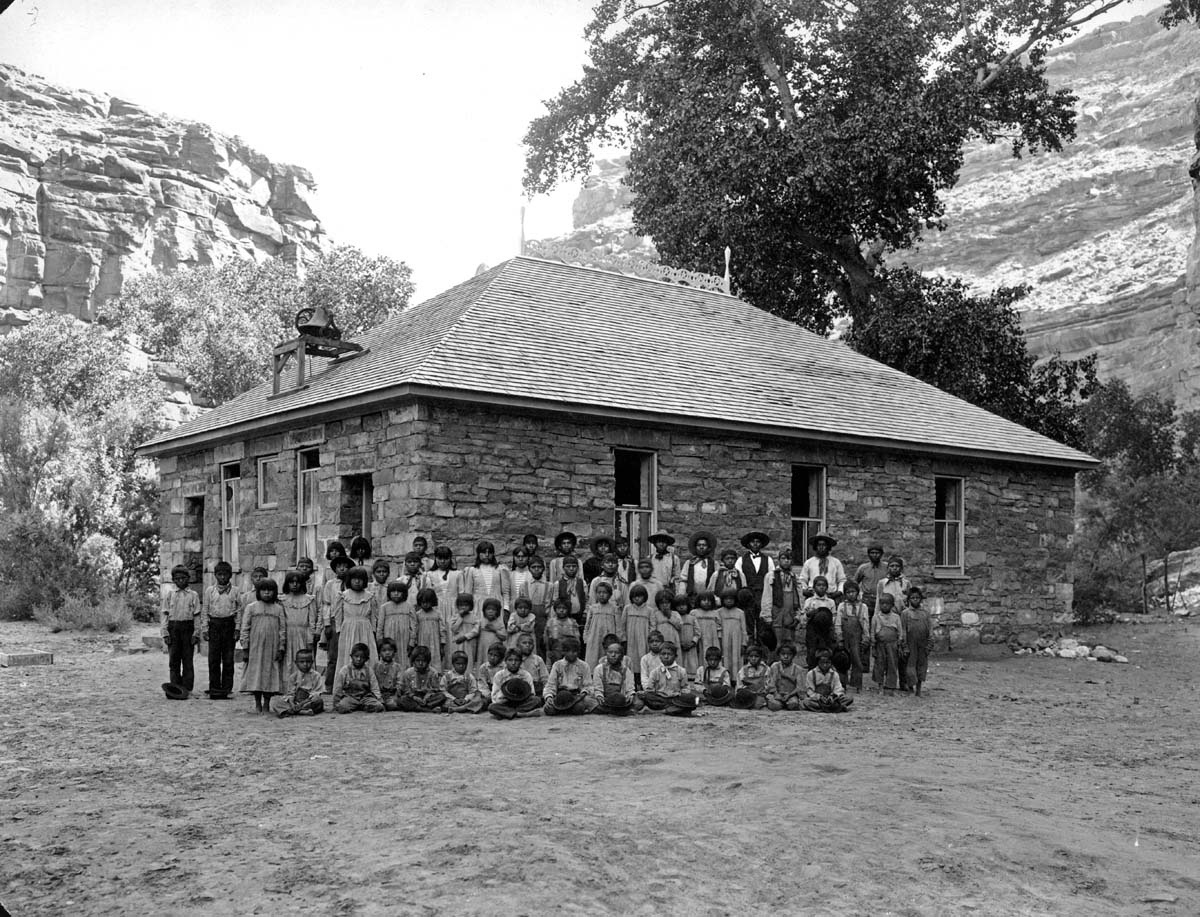
The school in 1899

It had been established by 1895. At one point it was a boarding school. In different periods of history, the federal government directly controlled the school. In other periods, the Havasupai tribe controlled the school. In 1908 its enrollment was 42.

In 1910 there was a flood of Supai which affected the town, including the school. In 1911 The Indian Leader wrote that the facility, post-flood, was "in fine condition."

In the 1930s it was scheduled to be remodeled.

Circa the 1950s the school occupied what later became a library, and at one point in that decade the school stopped operations, with all students in Supai going to boarding school.

The school resumed operations in the 1960s. In 1967 the school served up to grade 2, which meant students in subsequent grades had to go to boarding schools outside of Supai. Martin Goodfriend, who advocated for the Supai people, had suggested that the Havasupai School be extended for more years.

In 1978 it had grades K-6.

In 1988 the school had instruction in both English and the Havasupai language in a bilingual manner, and had instruction in the culture of the Havasupai people.

In 2002 the BIA resumed control of the school, and as of 2017 it has remained in control of the school.

In 2017 Alden Woods of the Arizona Republic wrote that it "stands out as the worst school" in the BIE. Woods cited "a rotation of principals and a regular teacher shortage", the latter which resulted in sporadic weeklong closures, or as the janitor being a substitute teacher, according to a lawsuit filed against the BIE that year. According to the lawsuit, teachers often did not finish the academic year. Woods also cited a lack of a school library, no after-school activities, and the lowest scores in mathematics and English among BIE schools despite only teaching those subjects. The school was intended to also teach the Havasupai language and the culture of the Havasupai tribe, but it did not, according to the lawsuit.

The lawsuit was filed in January 2017. Steven P. Logan, a U.S. district judge, allowed the lawsuit to proceed in March. In the course of the lawsuit, the BIE director, Tony Dearman, had a meeting in Supai with the community. A settlement was agreed upon in October 2020.

In 2018 a group of ex-employees, "Friends of Havasupai Elementary," advocated for making Havasupai Elementary tribally-controlled, or a charter school with tribal backing.

== Student body ==
In 2011 it had 94 students K-8.

As of 2017 the school had 70 students, with around 35 classified as having special needs. Despite the high number of special needs students, the school offered no special needs services.

As of 2017 about 20% of the students eventually get high school diplomas.

== Facility ==
The building has one story.

In 2011, to alleviate overpopulation, the BIE arranged to have a modular classroom airlifted into sections to Havasupai Elementary, where it would be assembled.

== Governance ==
While the Havasupai tribe maintains a board for education matters, Woods stated in 2017 that the board lacks "real influence".

In the 1950s the school did not use corporal punishment because the tribe was against the practice.

As of 2017, the school had an early noon dismissal on Fridays in order to make it easier for teachers to return to non-Supai residences.

In 2017, a landmark lawsuit was filed against the federal government over its management of the school.

== Academic performance ==
The students were in the third percentile for mathematics and the first percentile for reading during the 2012–2013 school year.

== Student discipline ==
In 2017, Alia Wong of The Atlantic wrote "Students are repeatedly suspended or referred to law enforcement".

At Havasupai Elementary School, circa 2017, there had been allegations of teachers resorting to punitive measures for minor misbehavior due to a lack of resources and limited understanding of the local culture. The school had, by that year, faced criticism for its handling of student discipline, with some parents and community members expressing concern over the outsized consequences for minor infractions.

A lawsuit filed in 2017 highlighted issues with the school’s disciplinary practices, including allegations of the janitor serving as a substitute teacher. The lawsuit also claimed that teachers often did not finish the academic year, which could potentially disrupt the school’s disciplinary structure.

Despite these challenges, the school remains the only option for elementary education on the Havasupai Indian Reservation, and students who feel unprepared often end up leaving high school early.

== School culture ==
In 2017 there were no student or extracurricular clubs at Havasupai Elementary.

As of 2017 there was no school library at Havasupai Elementary School. The school was intended to also teach the Havasupai language and the culture of the Havasupai tribe, but it did not, according to a lawsuit.

== Feeder patterns ==
As of 1988 students move on to boarding schools, with Sherman Indian High School in Riverside, California being the most common choice. Supai itself lacks a high school.
