= Rough Rock Community School =

Location
- RRTP #PTT HC 61 Box 1480; Chinle, Arizona 86503; United States; 36°24′53″N 109°51′20″W

Information
- Established: July 1966 (60 years ago)
- Superintendent: Marty Roessel
- CEEB code: 030049
- Principal: Ronald Thompson
- Grades: K-12
- Enrollment: 214 (2023–2024)
- Colors: Maroon and gold
- Mascot: Sun Devils
- Website: www.roughrock.k12.az.us

Rough Rock Community School, Inc. (RRCS) is a tribal K-12 school in Rough Rock, Arizona, with a Chinle postal address. Operated by the Navajo Nation, it is funded by the Bureau of Indian Education (BIE). As of 2011, the school had approximately 440 day and residential students. These include 166 high school students in grades 9 through 12.

== History ==
Founded by Robert Roessel Sr. and Ruth Roessel (Navajo), the school opened in 1966 as the Rough Rock Demonstration School (RRDS).

In response to Native American activists' efforts to take control of their children's educations, that was the first school for which the Bureau of Indian Affairs (BIA) contracted with a tribal nation to operate it; the Navajo Nation were the first to operate a BIA school. The Navajo changed the curriculum to reflect their own culture, history, and traditions, or code of ethics, in addition to general academic coursework related to United States culture and other topics.

In 1994 Rough Rock incorporated as a nonprofit and changed its name to Community School, as it was not a demonstration school anymore.

=== Construction ===
In the early 21st century, projects were constructed to replace BIA facilities at the school. A 20,333-square-foot (1,889.0 m^{2}) K–8 dormitory with capacity for 86 students was built in 2010. A new K–8 academic building, and two additional dormitories were built in 2011. The project was the first replacement school project funded by the American Recovery and Reinvestment Act of 2009.
