= Manitoba Provincial Road 346 =

Provincial Road in Manitoba, Canada

Provincial Road 346
- PR 346 highlighted in red

Route information
- Maintained by Department of Infrastructure
- Length: 50.5 km (31.4 mi)
- Existed: 1966–present

Major junctions
- South end: PTH 3 near Ninga
- PTH 23 near Margaret
- North end: PTH 2 at Nesbitt

Location
- Country: Canada
- Province: Manitoba
- Rural municipalities: Killarney-Turtle Mountain, Prairie Lakes, Oakland-Wawanesa

Highway system
- Provincial highways in Manitoba; Winnipeg City Routes
← PR 345	→ PR 347

Provincial Road 346 (PR 346) is a mostly gravel 50.5-kilometre-long (31.4 mi) north–south highway in the Westman Region of Manitoba, Canada. It connects Ninga with Margaret and Nesbitt.

== Route description ==
PR 346 begins in the Municipality of Killarney-Turtle Mountain at an intersection with PTH 3 (Boundary Commission Trail) just south of Ninga. It heads north as a paved two-lane highway for 5 kilometres (3.1 mi) to enter the hamlet at an intersection with PR 443. Traveling along the western edge of town, the highway crosses a railroad and has an intersection with Railway Street before the pavement turns to gravel, and the highway leaves Ninga to head north through rural farmland. Entering the Rural Municipality of Prairie Lakes, PR 346 goes through a switchback before having a junction with PTH 23 and traveling through Margaret, where it has a brief paved section. The highway becomes slightly narrower as it goes through switchbacks and hairpin curves for the next several kilometers down a mountain pass into a river valley, where it crosses a narrow one-lane bridge over the Souris River. Climbing back out of the valley, though much straighter this time, it enters the Municipality of Oakland-Wawanesa and comes to an end shortly thereafter at a junction with PTH 2 (Red Coat Trail) just on the outskirts of Nesbitt.

== History ==
Prior to 1992, PR 346 continued south, via a concurrency with PTH 3 (Boundary Commission Trail), for an additional 11.1 kilometres (6.9 mi) along Wakopa Road (Road 106W) to a junction with PR 341 just north of Wakopa.

== Major intersections ==
Division	Location	km	mi	Destinations	Notes
Killarney-Turtle Mountain		0.0	0.0	PTH 3 (Boundary Commission Trail) – Killarney, Boissevain	Southern terminus
Killarney-Turtle Mountain	Ninga	5.0	3.1	PR 443 west – Boissevain	Eastern terminus of PR 443
Killarney-Turtle Mountain	Ninga	5.3	3.3	Railway Street – Ninga	Pavement ends
Prairie Lakes		26.3	16.3	PTH 23 – Minto, Ninette	Pavement begins
Prairie Lakes	Margaret	28.0	17.4	Road 106W	Pavement ends
Prairie Lakes		35.2– 35.3	21.9– 21.9	Bridge over the Souris River	
Oakland-Wawanesa	Nesbitt	50.5	31.4	PTH 2 (Red Coat Trail) – Brandon, Nesbitt, Wawanesa	Northern terminus; road continues north as Road 106W
1.000 mi = 1.609 km; 1.000 km = 0.621 mi
