= Manitoba Highway 18 =

Provincial highway in Manitoba, Canada

Provincial Trunk Highway 18
- PTH 18 highlighted in red
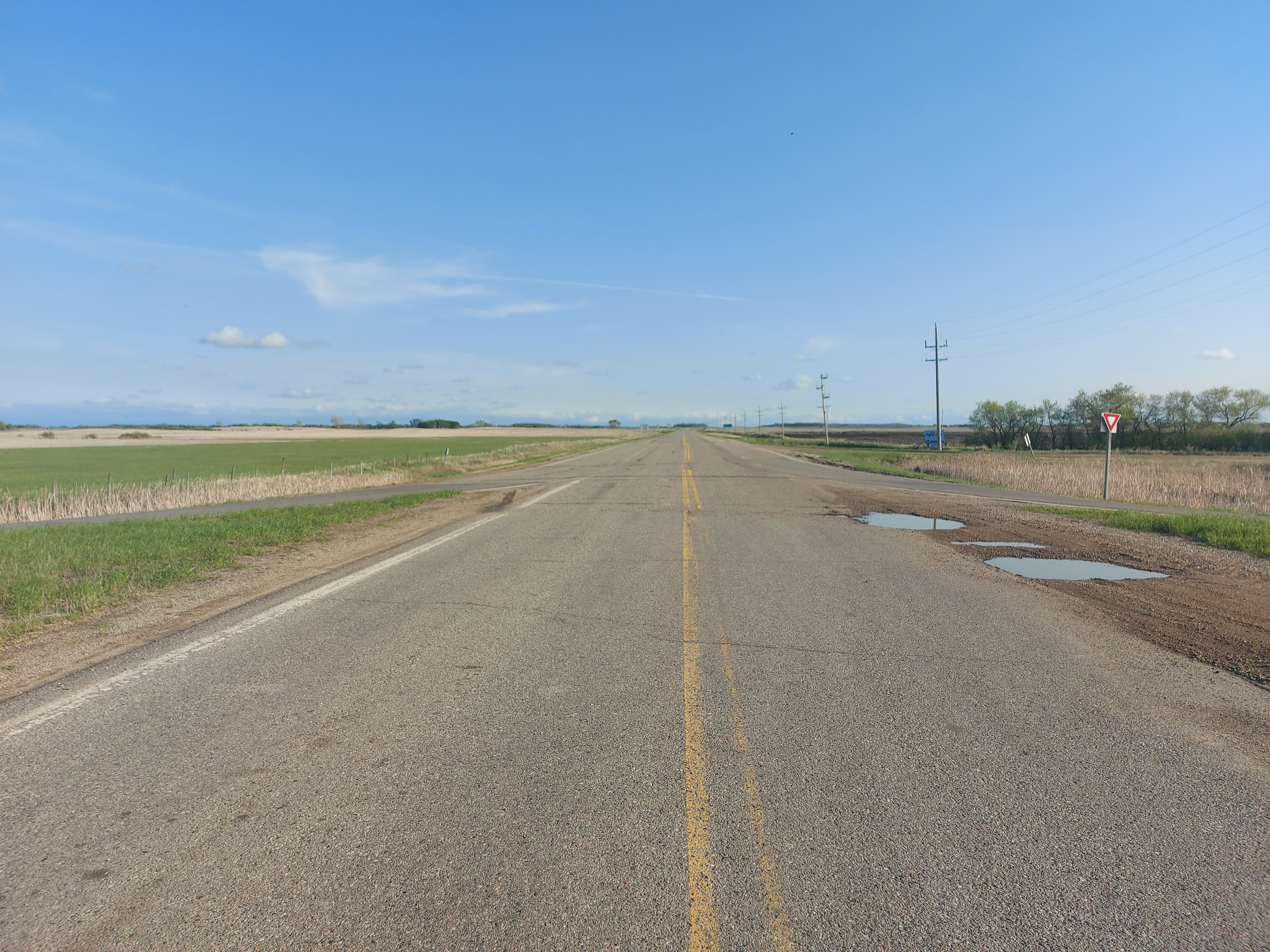
- Highway 18 at its northern terminus

Route information
- Maintained by Manitoba Infrastructure
- Length: 64.6 km (40.1 mi)
- Existed: 1928–present

Major junctions
- South end: ND 30 at the U.S. border near Lena
- PTH 3 in Killarney; PTH 23 in Ninette
- North end: PTH 2 near Wawanesa

Location
- Country: Canada
- Province: Manitoba
- Rural municipalities: Glenboro-South Cypress, Killarney-Turtle Mountain, Prairie Lakes

Highway system
- Provincial highways in Manitoba; Winnipeg City Routes
← PTH 17	→ PTH 19

Provincial Trunk Highway 18 (PTH 18) is a provincial highway in the Canadian province of Manitoba. Located in the Westman Region, it is a north–south route, with the southern terminus at the St. John–Lena Border Crossing at the Canada–United States border and the northern terminus at PTH 2, 7.1 kilometres (4.4 mi) southeast of Wawanesa. The highway passes through the communities of Killarney and Ninette. It is designated as an RTAC route, meaning it is capable of handling RTAC vehicles such as a truck, a truck and pony trailer, a truck and full trailer, a truck tractor and semi-trailer, an A-train, a B-train, or a C-train.

== Route description ==
PTH 18 begins in the Rural Municipality of Killarney-Turtle Mountain at the North Dakota Border, with the road continuing into Rolette County towards St. John and Rolla as North Dakota Highway 30 (ND 30). The border crossing lies only 6.5 miles (10.5 km) west from Turtle Mountain. The highway heads due north through farmland for a few kilometres to pass through Lena, where it has an intersection with PR 341. It becomes concurrent (overlapped) with PTH 3 (part of the Boundary Commission Trail), and the two head north to cross the Long River into the town of Killarney, with PTH 3 (as well as the Boundary Commission Trail) splitting off and heading west along the banks of Killarney Lake while PTH 18 continues north through neighbourhoods and a business district as it bypasses downtown along its eastern side. PTH 18 leaves Killarney to cross the Pembina River and have a junction with PR 253 before entering the Rural Municipality of Prairie Lakes.

The highway has a short concurrency with PTH 23 as it travels through Ninette, travelling along the coast lines of Pelican Lake and Grassy Lake, crossing a creek and travelling through wooded areas and past several smaller lakes as it enters the Rural Municipality of Glenboro-South Cypress. After a few kilometres, PTH 18 comes to an end at intersection with PTH 2 (Red Coat Trail), approximately 5 kilometres (3.1 mi) southeast of Wawanesa.

The entire length of Manitoba Highway 18 is a rural, paved, two-lane highway.

== History ==
PTH 18 was designated by 1928 from the United States border to south of Killarney. In 1929, it extended north to Wawanesa, replacing PTH 19.

== Major intersections ==
Division	Location	km	mi	Destinations	Notes
Killarney-Turtle Mountain		0.0	0.0	ND 30 south – Rolla	Continuation into North Dakota
Killarney-Turtle Mountain		0.0	0.0	St. John–Lena Border Crossing at the US border	
Killarney-Turtle Mountain	Lena	8.3	5.2	PR 341 west	
Killarney-Turtle Mountain		9.9	6.2	PTH 3 east (Boundary Commission Trail) – Pilot Mound	Southern end of PTH 3 concurrency
Killarney-Turtle Mountain	Killarney	19.2	11.9	PTH 3 west (Boundary Commission Trail) – Deloraine	Northern end of PTH 3 concurrency
Killarney-Turtle Mountain		28.6	17.8	PR 253 east – Pleasant Valley	
Prairie Lakes		44.2	27.5	PTH 23 west – Minto, Hartney	Southern end of PTH 23 concurrency
Prairie Lakes	Ninette	46.3	28.8	PTH 23 east – Belmont, Swan Lake	Northern end of PTH 23 concurrency
Glenboro-South Cypress		64.6	40.1	PTH 2 (Red Coat Trail) – Souris, Treherne	
1.000 mi = 1.609 km; 1.000 km = 0.621 mi: Concurrency terminus
