= Rural Municipality of Strathcona =

Rural municipality in Manitoba, Canada

Coordinates: 49°22′36″N 99°29′42″W

The Rural Municipality of Strathcona is a former rural municipality (RM) in the Canadian province of Manitoba. It was originally incorporated as a rural municipality in April 1906. It ceased to exist on January 1, 2015, as a result of its provincially mandated amalgamation with the RM of Riverside to form the Rural Municipality of Prairie Lakes.

The former RM is located northeast of Killarney and was named for The 1st Baron Strathcona and Mount Royal. In 2011 the RM had a population of 643 which had declined from 727 in 2006.

== Communities ==
- Belmont
- Hartney Junction
- Hilton
