= Rural Municipality of Riverside =

Rural municipality in Manitoba, Canada

Coordinates: 49°23′58″N 99°45′58″W

The Rural Municipality of Riverside is a former rural municipality (RM) in the Canadian province of Manitoba. It was originally incorporated as a rural municipality on December 22, 1883. It ceased on January 1, 2015 as a result of its provincially mandated amalgamation with the RM of Strathcona to form the Rural Municipality of Prairie Lakes. In 2011 the RM had a population of 780 which had declined from a population of 809 in 2006.

== Communities ==
- Dunrea
- Margaret
- Ninette

== Sources ==
- Groom, H.D. (2005). "Aggregate resources in the rural municipalities of Riverside and Turtle Mountain, southwestern Manitoba (NTS 62G3, 4, 5, 6 and 12)" (PDF). Report of Activities 2005. Manitoba Industry, Economic Development and Mines. Manitoba Geological Survey: 170–175.
