= Manitoba Provincial Road 341 =

Provincial Road in Manitoba, Canada

Provincial Road 341
- PR 341 highlighted in red

Route information
- Maintained by Department of Infrastructure
- Length: 33.9 km (21.1 mi)
- Existed: 1966–present

Major junctions
- West end: PTH 10 near the International Peace Garden
- East end: PTH 18 in Lena

Location
- Country: Canada
- Province: Manitoba
- Rural municipalities: Boissevain-Morton, Killarney-Turtle Mountain

Highway system
- Provincial highways in Manitoba; Winnipeg City Routes
← PR 340	→ PR 342

Provincial Road 341 (PR 341) is a 33.9-kilometre-long (21.1 mi) east–west highway in the Westman Region of Manitoba. Running along the northern fringes of Turtle Mountain, it connects the International Peace Garden with the hamlet of Lena, via the nearly abandoned and historic village of Wakopa.

== Route description ==
PR 341 begins between the International Peace Garden and the town of Boissevain at a junction with PTH 10 (John Bracken Highway) in the Municipality of Boissevain-Morton. It heads due east, having an intersection with Lake William Road (Road 112W, PR 444 prior to 1992), which leads to William Lake Provincial Park, before entering the Municipality of Killarney-Turtle Mountain at the intersection with Road 108W. The highway makes a sharp right turn at an intersection with Road 106W (PR 346 prior to 1992) before heading south past Wakopa and the Mayfair Hutterite Colony. Curving back eastward, PR 341 passes through rural farmland for several kilometres before entering the hamlet of Lena, coming to an end at an intersection with PTH 18. The entire length of PR 341 is a two-lane gravel road.

== Major intersections ==
Division	Location	km	mi	Destinations	Notes
Boissevain-Morton		0.0	0.0	PTH 10 (John Bracken Highway) – International Peace Garden, Boissevain	Western terminus
Boissevain-Morton		6.5	4.0	Lake William Road (Road 112W) – William Lake Provincial Park	Former PR 444 south
Killarney-Turtle Mountain		17.6	10.9	Road 106W – Ninga	Former PR 346 north
Killarney-Turtle Mountain	Wakopa	20.2	12.6	Railway Avenue – Wakopa	
Killarney-Turtle Mountain	Lena	33.9	21.1	PTH 18 – Killarney, Rolla	Eastern terminus; road continues east as Road 5N
1.000 mi = 1.609 km; 1.000 km = 0.621 mi
