= Pelican Lake (Manitoba) =

Lake in Manitoba, Canada

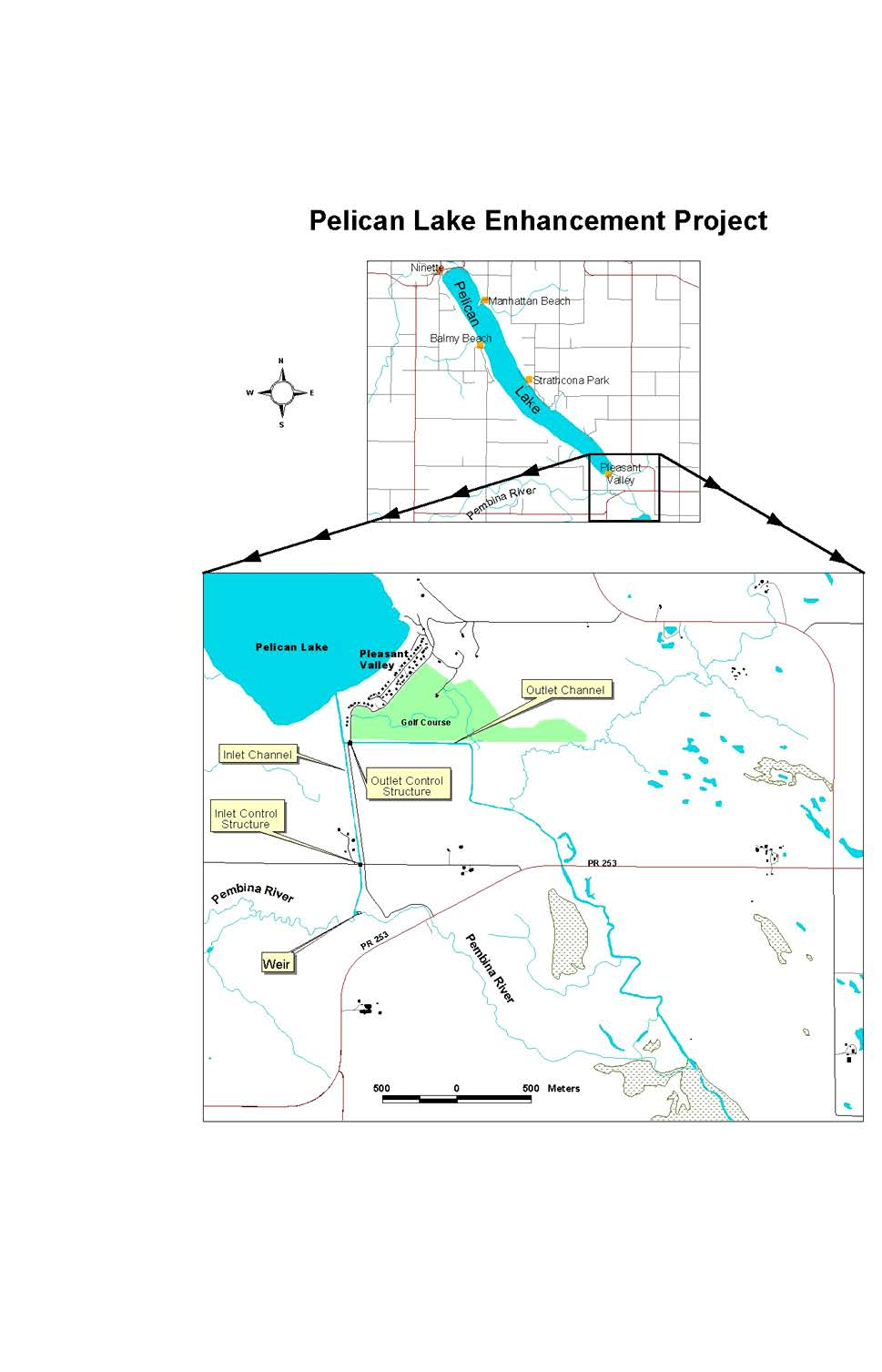

- Location of the lake in Manitoba Pelican Lake (Canada)
- Location: Manitoba, Canada
- Coordinates: 49°20′09″N 99°33′49″W
- Primary inflows: Orthez drain
- Catchment area: 686 km^{2} (265 sq mi)
- Managing agency: Pelican Lake Regulation Project
- Max. length: 18 km (11 mi)
- Max. width: 1.6 km (1 mi)
- Surface area: 27.8 km^{2} (10.7 sq mi)
- Average depth: 3.8 m (12 ft)
- Max. depth: 5.2 m (17 ft)
- Water volume: 108,000,000,000 litres (2.4×10^{10} imp gal; 2.9×10^{10} US gal)
- Surface elevation: 412.0 m (1,351.7 ft)
- Settlements: Ninette

Pelican Lake is the largest navigable lake in southwestern Manitoba, Canada. It is about 18 kilometres (11 miles) long and 1.6 kilometres (1 mile) wide, with a surface area of 27.8 square kilometres (10.7 square miles). Pelican Lake is relatively shallow with a mean depth of 3.8 metres and a maximum of 5.2 metres and holds 108 billion litres when the lake is at a surface water level of 412.0 metres. The lake is regulated, with a normal summer target level of 412.0 metres. The lake is fed by several small waterways, the main one being the Orthez drain. The total drainage area is 686 square kilometres (265 sq mi).

The lake has been a popular recreational area since the turn of the 20th century when trains brought visitors, cottagers and campers from Brandon and Winnipeg. The lake area is popular for boating, sailing, fishing, a wide variety of water activities, cottagers and home owners.

The town of Ninette is at the north end of the lake. Ninette is less than a one-hour drive to Brandon, or a two-hour drive to Winnipeg. The lake is located in the Rural Municipalities of Killarney-Turtle Mountain and Prairie Lakes.

== Pelican Lake Regulation Project ==
The Pelican Lake Regulation Project was constructed in 1990–1992 to control water levels on Pelican Lake. The project includes a channel and control structure to divert water into the lake from the Pembina River when lake levels are low, and another channel and control structure to discharge water from the lake to the river when Pelican Lake levels are high. (See map) These works are operated by Manitoba Infrastructure and Transportation under rules provided through an Environment Act Licence. Advice on the operation of the inlet and outlet works is provided by the Pelican Lake Advisory Committee.

The lake is normally maintained at elevations between 411.5 and 412 metres (1,350 and 1,352 ft) above sea level during summer months. During the spring period, the lake may be raised temporarily to an elevation of 412.2 metres (1,352 ft). When the lake is low, water may be diverted from the Pembina River into the lake through an inlet diversion channel. The maximum rate of diversion into the lake is approximately 9 cubic metres per second (320 cubic feet per second). Diversions into the lake are not allowed when flow in the Pembina River is less than 0.4 cubic metres per second (14 cu ft/s), and diversions are not started in the spring until Lorne and Louise lakes have filled to an elevation of 1338.9 feet.

When desired, water from Pelican Lake may be discharged into the Pembina River through an outlet diversion channel. The maximum rate of diversion out of the lake is approximately 11 cubic metres per second (390 cubic feet per second), and releases cannot be made without a licence variance if the combined outflow from the lake and flow in the Pembina River exceeds 20 cubic metres per second (710 cubic feet per second).

When the diversion into the lake is operated at full capacity for one day, an increase in lake level of approximately 1.2 inches will result. When water is being diverted out of the lake, operation of the outlet at full capacity for one day will result in a lowering of the lake level of approximately 1.5 inches. This calculation assumes no inflow into the lake and that Pembina River flows are low enough to allow the entire outlet capacity of the diversion to be used. In fact, a considerable amount of inflow enters the lake in most years, and releases from Pelican Lake are often limited by high flows in the Pembina River.

Although the works were primarily built to raise the lake level from its low of 1346.0 in 1991. Its real value came in the wet period from 1995 to 2017 when the equivalent of over 50 feet on the lake was diverted out, preventing serious flooding in many years of that period. From 1962 to 1994 the median annual inflow was equivalent to about 6.5 inches on the lake. From 1995 to 2017 it was 32.6 inches per year.

== See also ==
- List of lakes of Manitoba
