= Compliance buyout =

National Hockey League contract buyout that does not count against the salary cap

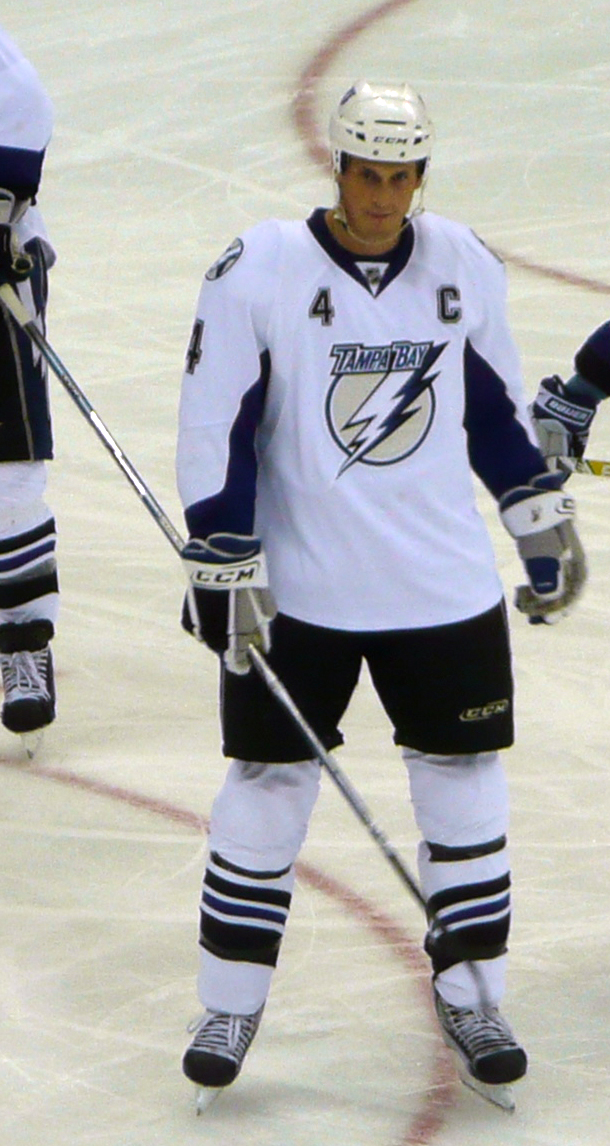
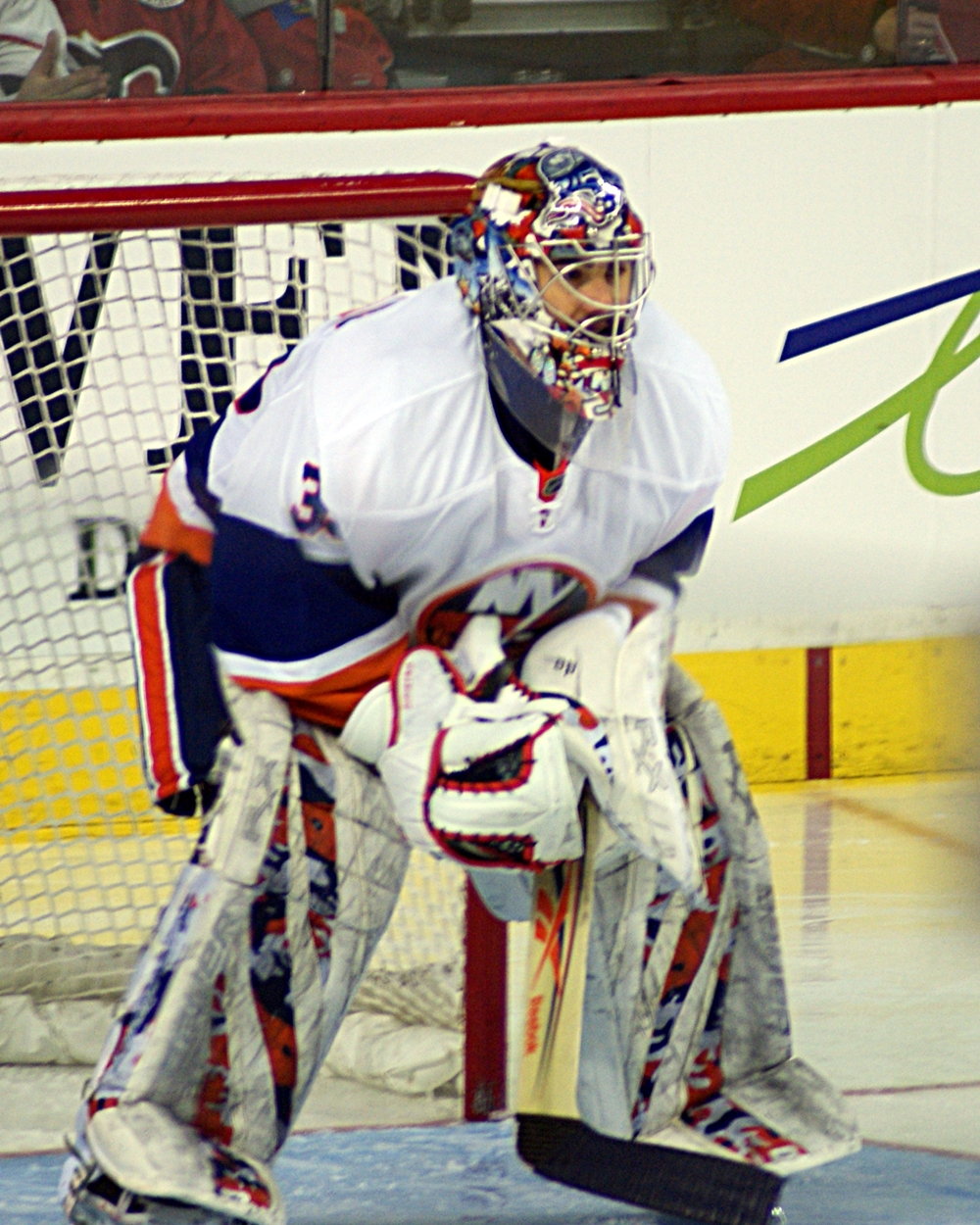
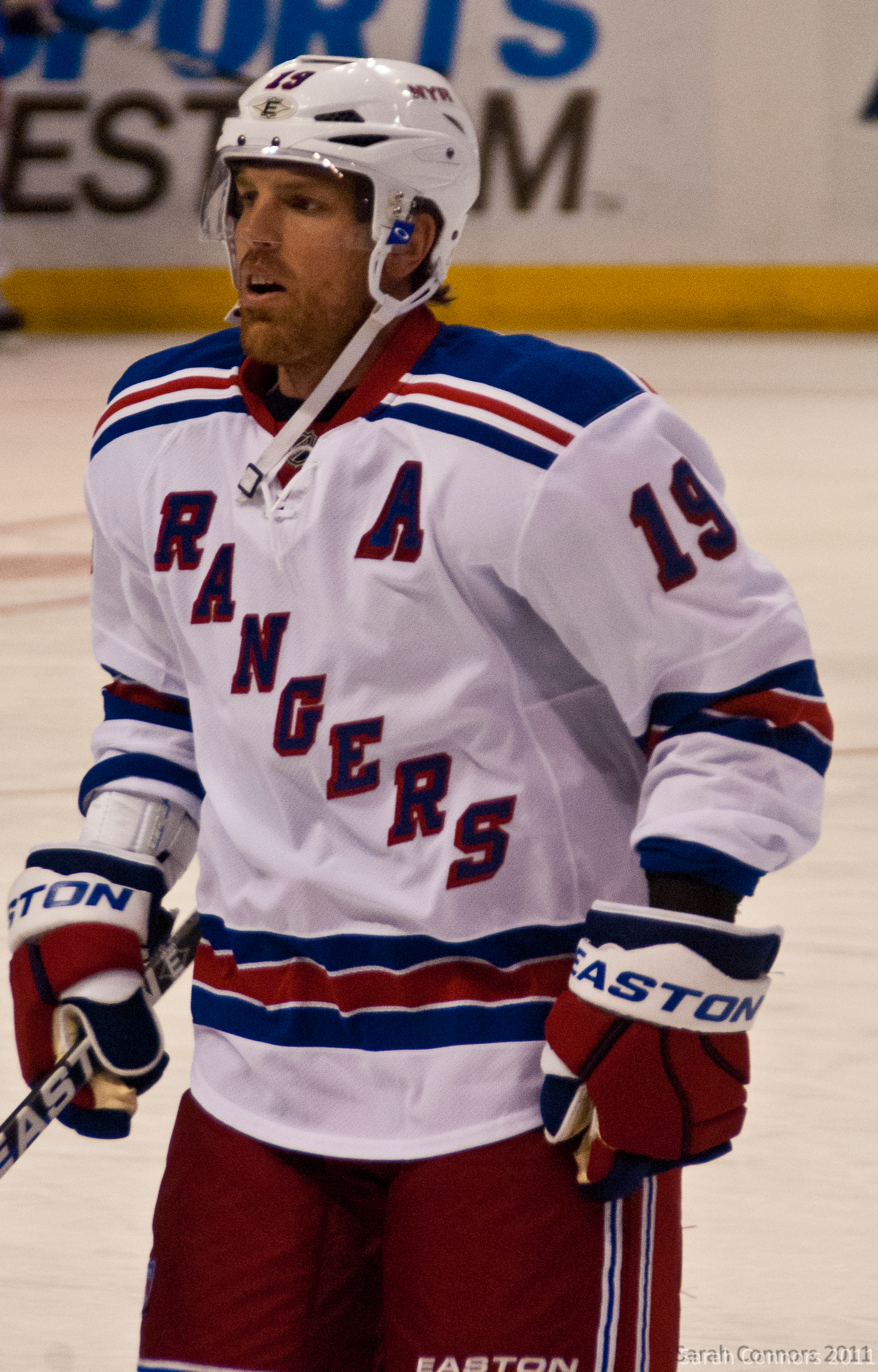
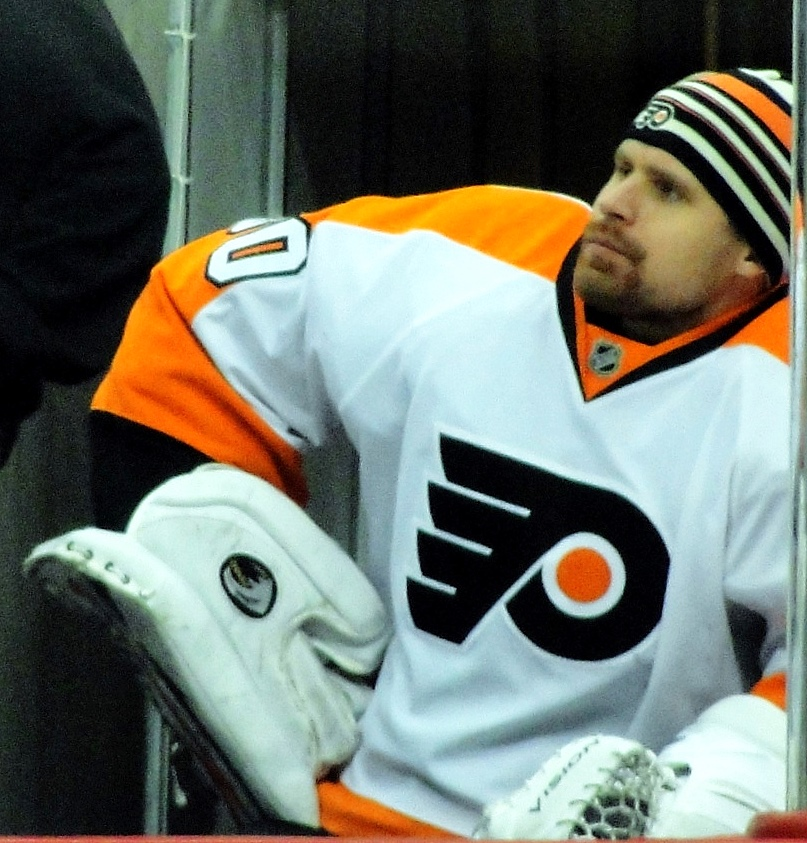
The most expensive NHL compliance buyouts. Clockwise from upper left: Vincent Lecavalier, Rick DiPietro, Ilya Bryzgalov and Brad Richards.

Compliance buyouts (sometimes referred to as amnesty buyouts) allow National Hockey League (NHL) teams to buy out a player's contract without the amount paid out counting against the NHL salary cap. In either a compliance or ordinary-course buyout, the team pays the player two-thirds of the remaining value of a contract over twice the remaining length of the contract. If the player is under 26 years old, then the team may pay the player just one-third of the remaining contract value. In an ordinary-course buyout, the amount paid out to the player each year counts against the team's salary cap for that season.

Due to the 2012–13 NHL lockout, the salary cap was not to increase to the projected $70.2 million, so each team was therefore granted two compliance buyouts to be exercised after the 2012–13 season and/or after the 2013–14 season that would not count against the salary cap in any further year in order to better comply with a lower than expected cap value, regardless of the player's age. After using a compliance buyout on a player, that player is prohibited from rejoining the team that bought him out for one year; the NHL deemed that the re-signing of a player following a trade and a subsequent compliance buyout would be ruled as cap circumvention.

Following the 2012–13 NHL lockout each team was granted one accelerated compliance buyout in order for teams to meet the lowered salary cap. This could be used on a player with a salary cap hit of US$3 million or more before the regular season began. If an accelerated compliance buyout is used, that team will only have one more compliance buyout left, and they must use it after the completion of the 2012–13 season (and before the start of 2013–14 season). The player's cap hit is applied in full to the team's salary cap for the 2012–13 season, but for no season after, regardless of contract length.

Available during the off-season in 2013 and 2014, amnesty buyouts begin 48 hours after the conclusion of the Stanley Cup Final.

In 2013, it began 48 hours after the conclusion of the Stanley Cup, and ended on July 4, 2013. The second NHL compliance buyout period opened on June 16, 2014, and ran through June 30, 2014, with 26 teams having one or more compliance buyout available to be used.

There was also a period for unlimited compliance buyouts following the 2004–05 NHL lockout from July 23–29, 2005. Only nine teams opted to take advantage of this period, buying out a total of 13 players, and only three teams bought out more than one player. Due to a contract dispute between the Toronto Maple Leafs and Owen Nolan, Toronto arranged with the league to utilize a compliance buyout on Nolan if it was ruled he had the right to exercise a contract option for the 2005–06 season.

Combining the 2005 and 2013–2014 compliance buyout periods, 21 teams bought out at least one player. The Detroit Red Wings have bought out the most players (5), while the Philadelphia Flyers (4) and New York Rangers (3) are the only other teams with more than two. Nine franchises (eleven if the Seattle Kraken and Vegas Golden Knights are included) have never used a compliance buyout. They are the Anaheim Ducks, Boston Bruins, Carolina Hurricanes, Los Angeles Kings, Nashville Predators, Ottawa Senators, Pittsburgh Penguins, St. Louis Blues, and Winnipeg Jets (formerly the Atlanta Thrashers).

== List of compliance buyouts ==
=== 2013–2014 ===
The following is an unofficial list of all the compliance buyouts that have been used:

Team	Player	Date	Length	Amount	Ref
Buffalo Sabres	Ville Leino	June 18, 2014	6 years	$7,333,333	
Buffalo Sabres	Christian Ehrhoff	June 29, 2014	14 years	$12,000,000	
Calgary Flames	Shane O'Brien	June 30, 2014	2 years	$1,466,667	
Chicago Blackhawks	Steve Montador	June 27, 2013	4 years	$2,733,333	
Chicago Blackhawks	Rostislav Olesz	June 27, 2013	2 years	$2,833,333	
Dallas Stars	Aaron Rome	June 17, 2014	2 years	$1,066,667	
Detroit Red Wings	Carlo Colaiacovo	July 3, 2013	2 years	$1,900,000	
Detroit Red Wings	Jordin Tootoo	June 18, 2014	2 years	$1,333,333	
Edmonton Oilers	Eric Belanger	July 4, 2013	2 years	$833,333	
Florida Panthers	Ed Jovanovski	June 30, 2014	2 years	$2,666,667	
Minnesota Wild	Tom Gilbert	July 3, 2013	2 years	$2,000,000	
Montreal Canadiens	Scott Gomez (Note: Accelerated compliance buyout)	January 15, 2013	3 years	$3,000,000	
Montreal Canadiens	Tomas Kaberle	June 28, 2013	2 years	$3,000,000	
New Jersey Devils	Johan Hedberg	July 4, 2013	2 years	$933,333	
New Jersey Devils	Anton Volchenkov	June 30, 2014	4 years	$5,666,667	
New York Islanders	Rick DiPietro	July 3, 2013	16 years	$24,000,000	
New York Rangers	Wade Redden	January 17, 2013	3 years	$3,333,333	
New York Rangers	Brad Richards	June 20, 2014	12 years	$20,666,667	
Philadelphia Flyers	Daniel Briere	June 26, 2013	4 years	$3,333,333	
Philadelphia Flyers	Ilya Bryzgalov	June 26, 2013	14 years	$23,000,000	
San Jose Sharks	Martin Havlat	June 27, 2014	2 years	$4,000,000	
Tampa Bay Lightning	Vincent Lecavalier	June 27, 2013	14 years	$32,666,667	
Tampa Bay Lightning	Ryan Malone	June 25, 2014	2 years	$1,666,667	
Toronto Maple Leafs	Mike Komisarek	July 2, 2013	2 years	$2,333,333	
Toronto Maple Leafs	Mikhail Grabovski	July 4, 2013	8 years	$14,333,333	
Vancouver Canucks	Keith Ballard	July 3, 2013	4 years	$5,600,000	
Vancouver Canucks	David Booth	June 17, 2014	2 years	$3,166,667	
Washington Capitals	Jeff Schultz	July 3, 2013	2 years	$2,000,000	

=== 2005 ===
Team	Player	Date	Length (Note: Years remaining on contract)	Amount	Ref
Colorado Avalanche	Chris Gratton	July 28, 2005	1 year	$1,266,667	
Columbus Blue Jackets	Andrew Cassels	July 29, 2005	1 year	$1,500,000	
Columbus Blue Jackets	Scott Lachance	July 28, 2005	1 year	$1,000,000	
Dallas Stars	Pierre Turgeon	July 28, 2005	1 year	$2,970,000	
Detroit Red Wings	Derian Hatcher	July 26, 2005	3 years	$9,930,000	
Detroit Red Wings	Darren McCarty	July 26, 2005	2 years	$2,300,000	
Detroit Red Wings	Ray Whitney	July 26, 2005	1 year	$1,780,000	
Florida Panthers	Mathieu Biron	July 28, 2005	1 year	$713,000	
Minnesota Wild	Matt Johnson	July 29, 2005	2 years	$1,170,000	
New York Rangers	Bobby Holik	July 29, 2005	2 years	$9,000,000	
Philadelphia Flyers	Tony Amonte	July 23, 2005	1 year	$2,840,000	
Philadelphia Flyers	John LeClair	July 23, 2005	1 year	$4,560,000	
Phoenix Coyotes	Brian Savage	July 29, 2005	1 year	$1,900,000	
