= Margaret, Manitoba =

Margaret
- Location of Margaret in Manitoba
- Coordinates: 49°24′20″N 99°51′21″W
- Country: Canada
- Province: Manitoba
- Region: Westman
- Census Division: No. 5

Government
  - Governing Body: RM of Prairie Lakes
  - MP: Grant Jackson
  - MLA: Colleen Robbins
- Area code: 204
- GNBC Code: GBACH

Margaret is an unincorporated place in the Rural Municipality of Prairie Lakes (previously Rural Municipality of Riverside) in southwestern Manitoba. It is located on Manitoba Highway 346, north of Manitoba Highway 23, about midway between Dunrea, to its east, and Minto, to its west.

== Attractions ==
Margaret is home to the Margaret school monument, a cairn that commemorates all the schools that once operated in the vicinity. Margaret was once home to both a Manitoba Pool elevator and a United Grain Growers elevator. The Pool elevator ran from 1928 until 1981, before being closed down and later demolished. The UGG elevator ran from 1926 until 1977 and was also later demolished.
