= Lena, Manitoba =

Lena
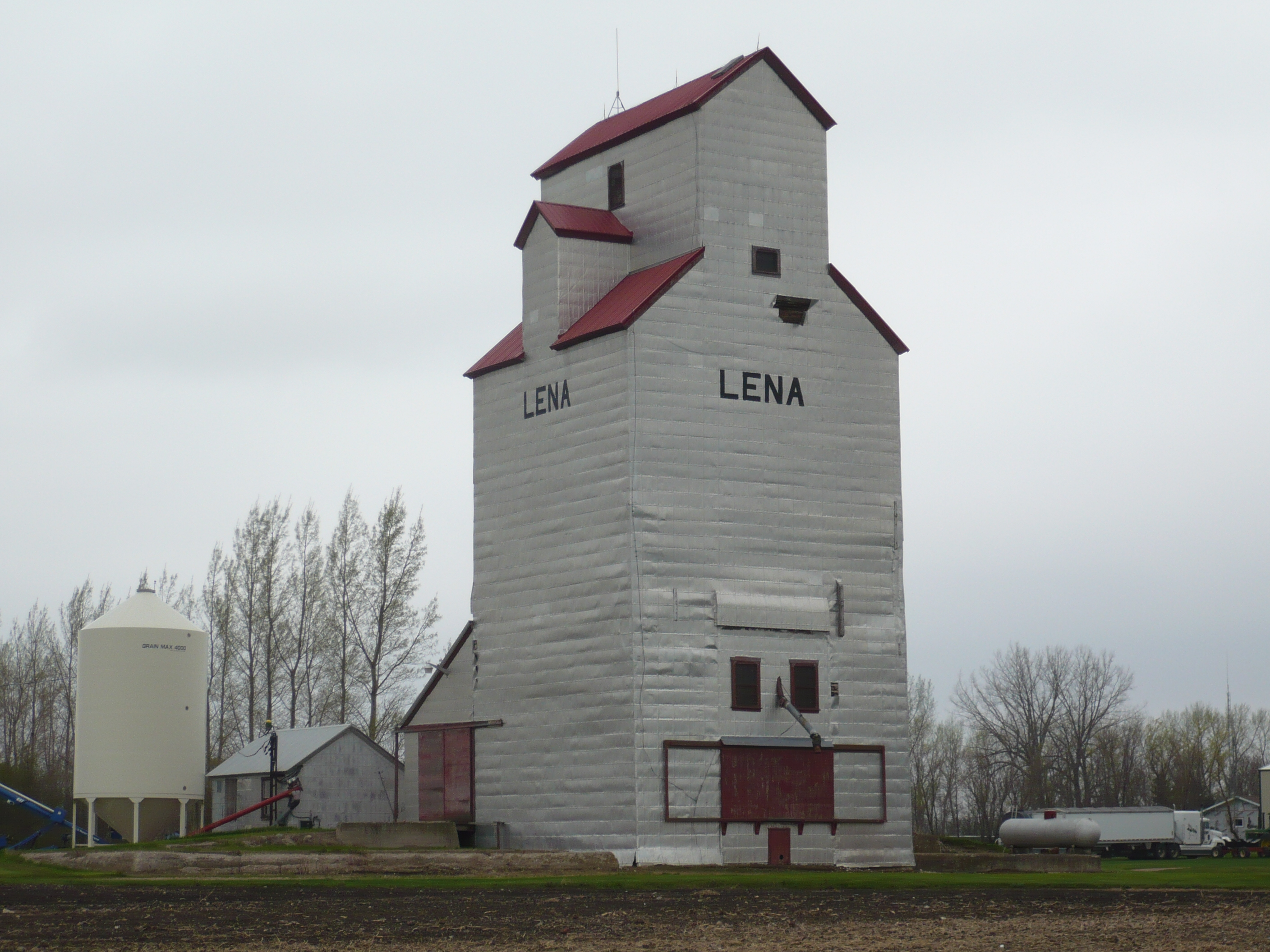
- Grain Elevator at Lena

- Location of Lena in Manitoba
- Coordinates: 49°4′16″N 99°39′42″W
- Country: Canada
- Province: Manitoba
- Region: Westman
- Census Division: No. 5

Government
  - Governing Body: Municipality of Killarney-Turtle Mountain Council
  - MP: Grant Jackson
  - MLA: Colleen Robbins
- Time zone: UTC−6 (CST)
  - Summer (DST): UTC−5 (CDT)
- Area codes: 204, 431
- NTS Map: 062G04
- GNBC Code: GAOLN

Lena is an unincorporated community located in the Municipality of Killarney-Turtle Mountain in south central Manitoba, Canada. It is located approximately 89 kilometers (55 miles) southeast of Brandon, Manitoba, at the junction of Manitoba Highway 18 and Provincial Road 341.

== See also ==
- St. John–Lena Border Crossing
