= Ninette, Manitoba =

Coordinates: 49°24′00″N 99°37′43″W

Ninette
- Local urban district
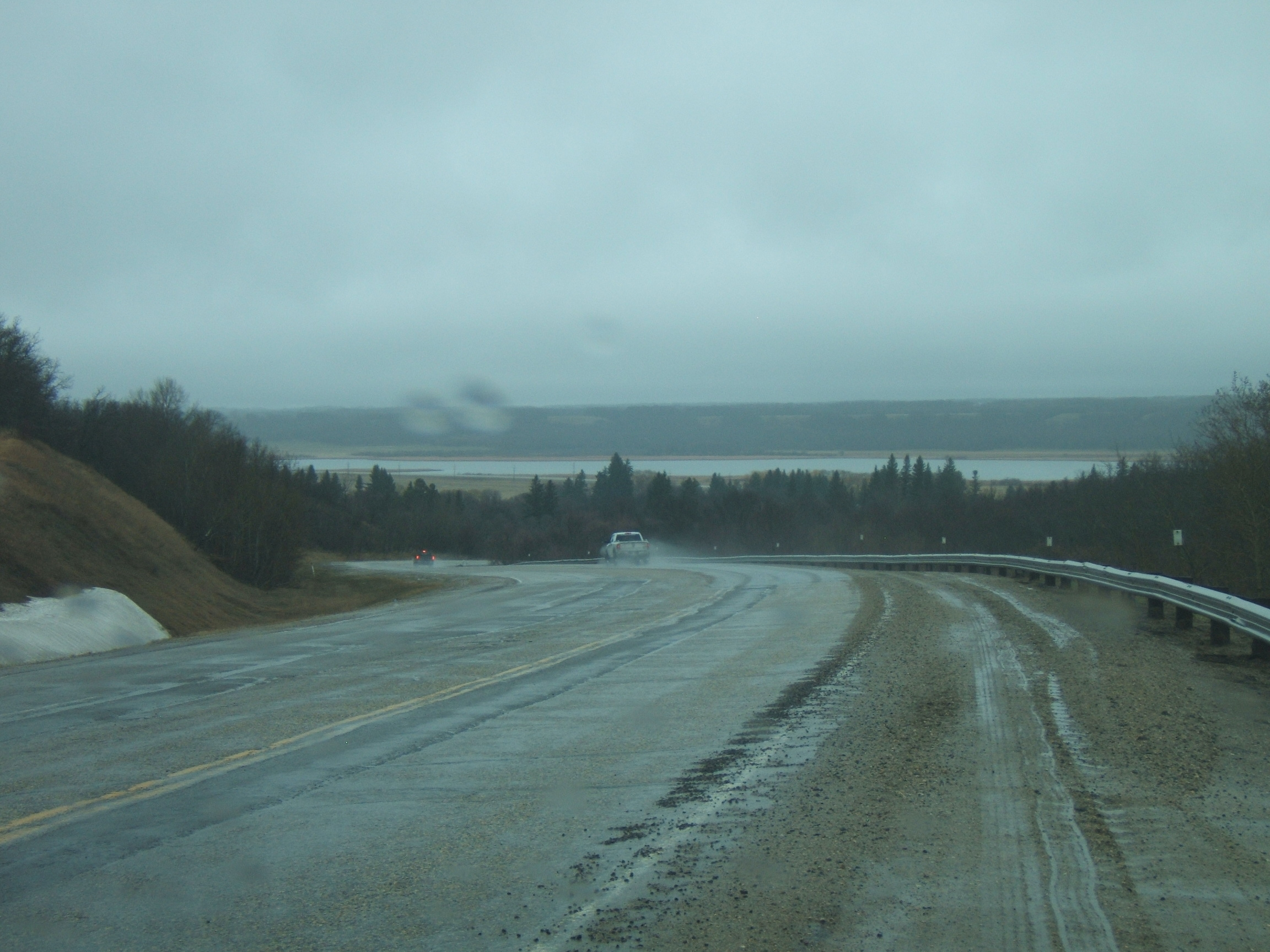
- Entering Ninette
- Interactive map of Ninette
- Country: Canada
- Province: Manitoba

Area
  - Total: 1.92 km^{2} (0.74 sq mi)

Population (2016)
  - Total: 224
  - Density: 115.4/km^{2} (299/sq mi)

Ninette is an unincorporated community recognized as a local urban district located in Manitoba, Canada at the north end of Pelican Lake. It is located in the Rural Municipality of Prairie Lakes. Ninette has many small businesses, and is known locally for its wide range of sports facilities. In the summer, activities such as boating, fishing, and hunting are offered, while snowmobiling and ice fishing are offered during the wintertime.

== History ==
Ninette's original post office was established in 1883 on a site near Overend Lake. It was later moved, following the construction of the Northern Pacific and Manitoba Railway in the area, to its current site near Pelican Lake, closer to the railway. In June 1926, Ninette became an unincorporated village.

There are multiple theories as to the name of the community, including being named informally for a French actress or waitress, the deceased daughter of a local resident, or a character in a novel that was being read by a postal inspector in the area, the name being short for Antoinette.

The Manitoba Sanatorium, a sanatorium for tuberculosis patients in the province, opened in May 1910 nearby on Pelican Lake's north shore, causing a growth in Ninette's population from the sanatorium's staff and patients' families, especially as its capacity quadrupled in its first 13 years. The sanatorium closed in 1972 after the development and prevalence of tuberculosis drugs and other treatments made the facility obsolete.

== Demographics ==
In the 2021 Census of Population conducted by Statistics Canada, Ninette had a population of 249 living in 120 of its 142 total private dwellings, a change of 12.7% from its 2016 population of 221. With a land area of 2.02 km^{2} (0.78 sq mi), it had a population density of 123.3/km^{2} (319.3/sq mi) in 2021.

In the 2016 Canadian census, the median age was 53.7 years old, 12.7 years older than the national average of 41.0. There were 110 private dwellings, 105 of which were occupied.

English-speakers comprise the vast majority of Ninette's population. In terms of Canada's official languages, 95.3% of the population speaks exclusively English, while the remaining 4.7% speaks both English and French. No other languages are spoken or known in the community.

Of those in Ninette aged 15 or older, 48.7% are married, 15.4% are living with a common-law partner, 23% have never been married, 2.6% are separated, 5.1% are divorced, and 7.7% are widowed.

Of the census families in Ninette, 71.4% consist of two persons, 21.4% consist of three persons, and the remaining 7.1% consist of five or more persons. The average size of a census family is 2.4 persons. Out of all of Ninette's couple census families, 66.7% are without children, while 25% have one child, and 8.3% have three or more children.

== Transportation ==
Ninette is located along the intersection of Manitoba Highways 18 and 23, which connects it to several other communities in the region, as well as the North Dakota border and the Pembina Valley region of the province.

== Climate ==
Ninette has a humid continental climate (Köppen climate classification Dfb) It falls into the NRC Plant Hardiness Zone 4a.

Information listed below is from Environment Canada Belmont Weather station

Climate data for Belmont, elevation: 481.6 m (1,580 ft), 1981–2010 normals
Month	Jan	Feb	Mar	Apr	May	Jun	Jul	Aug	Sep	Oct	Nov	Dec	Year
Average precipitation mm (inches)	23.6 (0.93)	26.2 (1.03)	27.0 (1.06)	26.3 (1.04)	76.4 (3.01)	96.6 (3.80)	78.3 (3.08)	69.2 (2.72)	39.7 (1.56)	37.3 (1.47)	27.2 (1.07)	30.8 (1.21)	558.6 (21.99)
Average rainfall mm (inches)	0.0 (0.0)	1.2 (0.05)	7.1 (0.28)	15.1 (0.59)	72.5 (2.85)	96.6 (3.80)	78.3 (3.08)	69.2 (2.72)	39.3 (1.55)	29.6 (1.17)	4.0 (0.16)	0.2 (0.01)	413.0 (16.26)
Average snowfall cm (inches)	23.6 (9.3)	25.0 (9.8)	19.9 (7.8)	11.2 (4.4)	3.9 (1.5)	0.0 (0.0)	0.0 (0.0)	0.0 (0.0)	0.4 (0.2)	7.7 (3.0)	23.3 (9.2)	30.6 (12.0)	145.5 (57.3)
Source: Environment Canada

== Notable people ==
- Martha Brooks, writer

== Books ==
- Holy Ground: The Story of the Manitoba Sanatorium at Ninette by David Bradshaw Stewart, J. A. Victor David Museum
- The Ninette Sanatorium : its object and the good it is doing. (1912)
- And So ... Ninette, 1879-1919 by Eva Calverley, circa 1966

== Songs ==
- John K. Samson - "Letter In Icelandic From The Ninette San"
- John K. Samson - "When I Write My Master's Thesis" mentions the Ninette Sanatorium

== Gallery ==
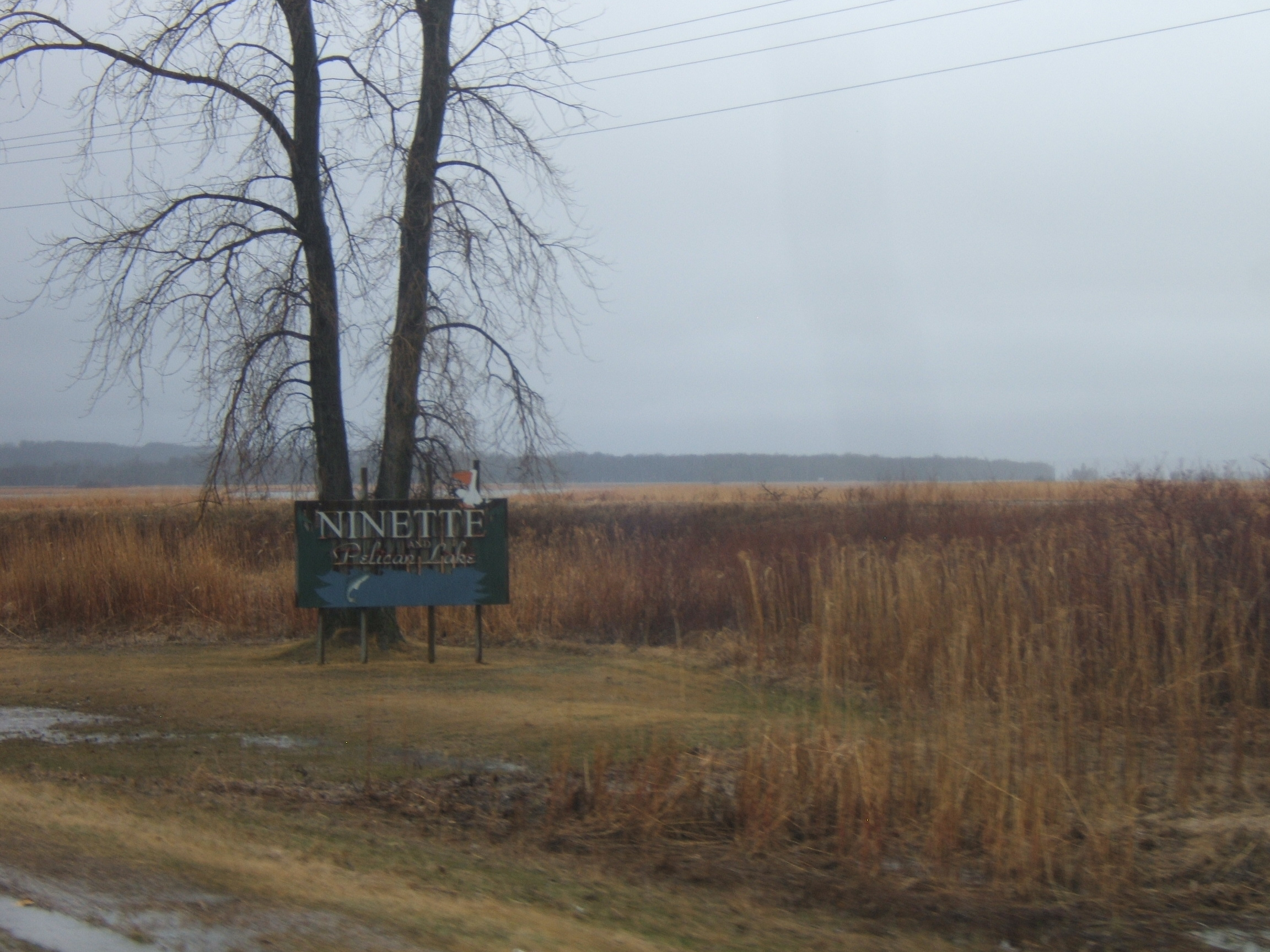
Entering Ninette, Manitoba

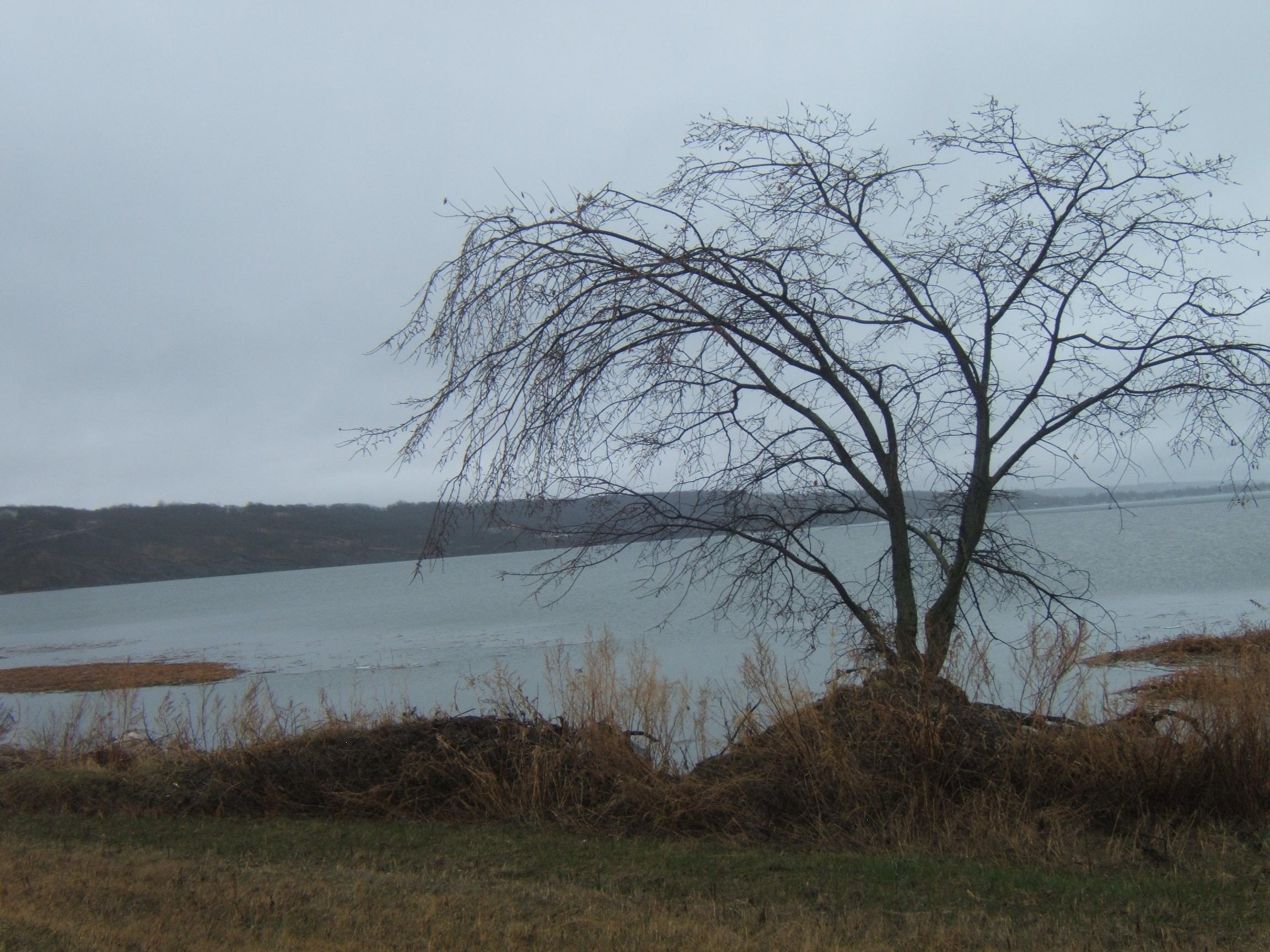
Pelican Lake, Ninette, MB.

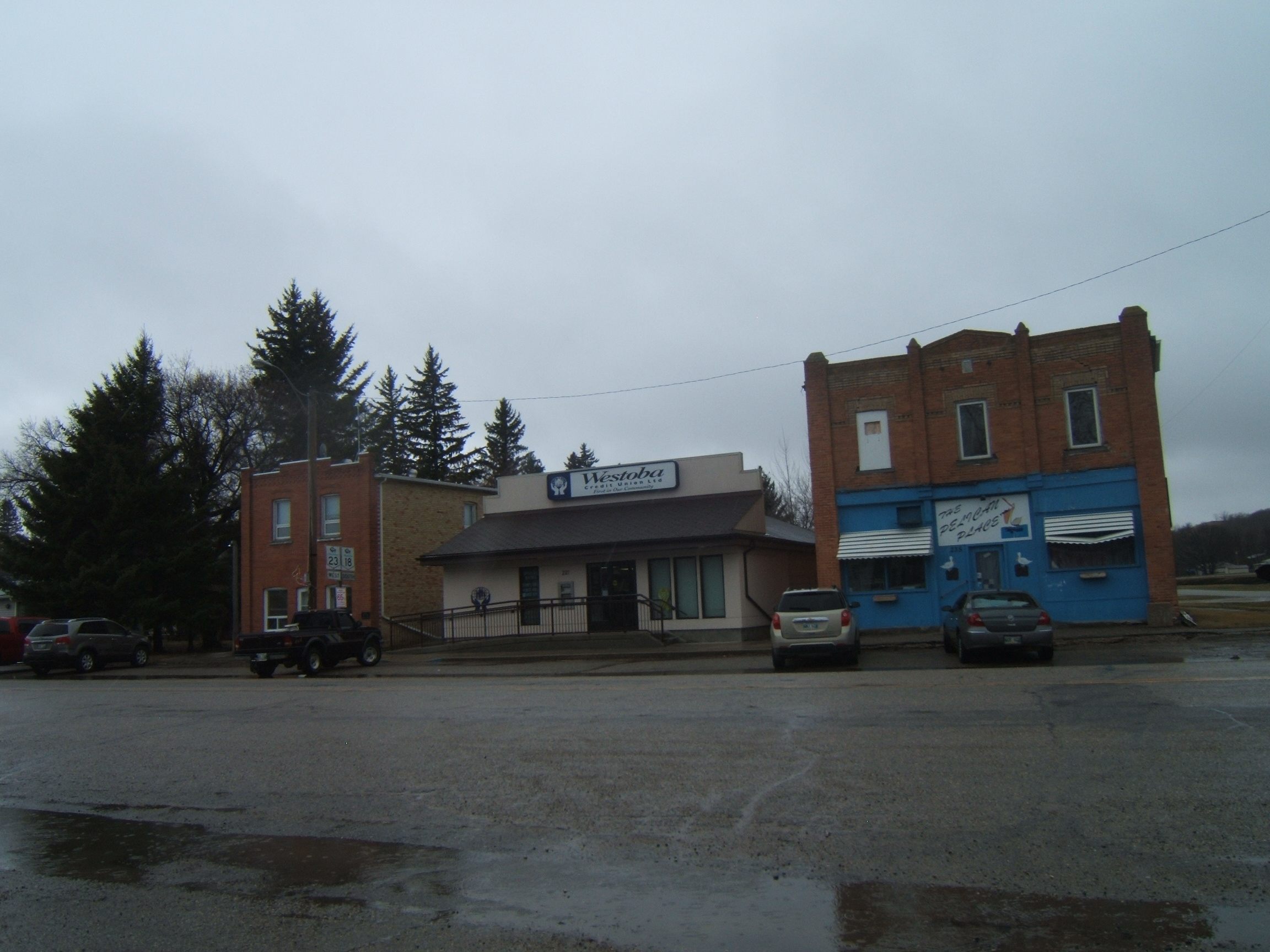
Downtown Ninette, MB.

== See also ==
- Pelican Lake
- RM of Prairie Lakes
- RM of Killarney-Turtle Mountain
- Manitoba Highway 18
- Manitoba Highway 23
