= Hilton, Manitoba =

Hilton
- Unincorporated community
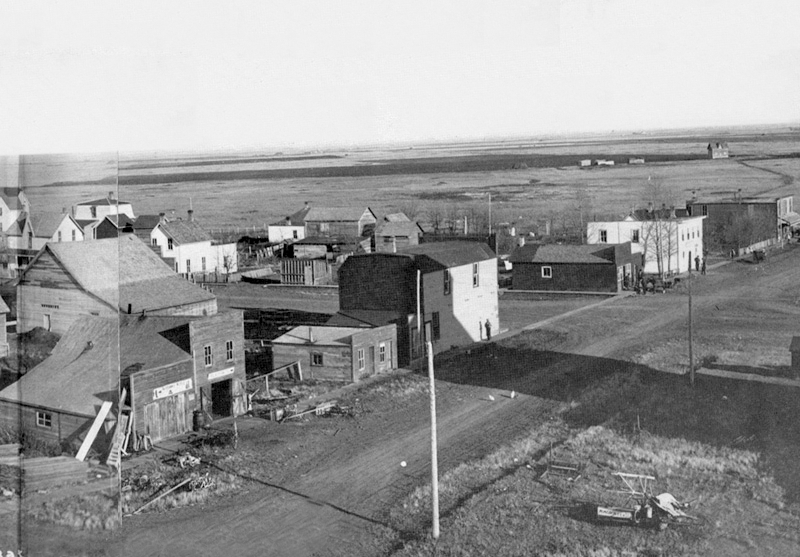
- Hilton, 1912

- Location within Manitoba
- Coordinates: 49°30′22″N 99°31′30″W
- Country: Canada
- Province: Manitoba
- Region: Westman
- Municipality: Prairie Lakes
- Time zone: UTC-6 (CST)
  - Summer (DST): UTC-5 (CDT)
- GNBC Code: GAKWP

Hilton is an unincorporated community in the Rural Municipality of Prairie Lakes, Manitoba, Canada.

== History ==
Hilton was established when the Northern Pacific and Manitoba Railway constructed a line through the region in the 1880s.

The Hilton School District was established in 1885, and a school was erected. The school closed in 1961. In 1895, the population was 200, and the settlement featured "a full range of rural village businesses" including a hardware store, livery, post office, restaurant, boarding house, two blacksmiths, two general stores, and three grain elevators. Hilton also had a race track, curling rink, pool room, and two churches.

Hilton began to decline in 1898, after the railway completed a branch travelling west from nearby Hartney Junction, cutting off Hilton's freight traffic. Businesses in Hilton closed down, and several residents moved away or moved their houses to neighbouring farms. In 1909, the population had declined to 100.

In 1952, a United Church was erected after the previous church was destroyed by fire; it is now a municipal historic site.

The population had declined to nine in 1987.
