= St. John–Lena Border Crossing =

Border crossing between Canada and the United States

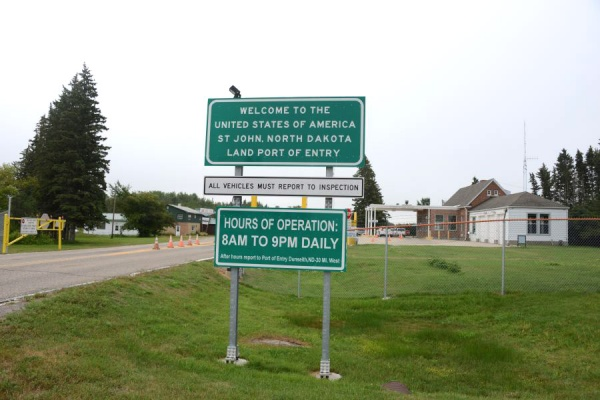
- US–Canada border at St. John, North Dakota

Location
- Country: United States; Canada
- Location: ND 30 / PTH 18; US Port: 10935 North Dakota Highway 30, St. John, North Dakota 58369-6910; Canadian Port: Manitoba Highway 18, Killarney, Manitoba R0K 1G0
- Coordinates: 48°59′57″N 99°39′32″W

Details
- Opened: 1930

Website
- US Canadian
- U.S. Inspection Station-St. John, North Dakota
- U.S. National Register of Historic Places
- MPS: U.S. Border Inspection Stations MPS
- NRHP reference No.: 14000588
- Added to NRHP: September 10, 2014

The St. John–Lena Border Crossing connects the towns of St. John, North Dakota and Killarney, Manitoba on the Canada–United States border. North Dakota Highway 30 on the American side joins Manitoba Highway 18 on the Canadian side.

== Canadian side ==
The initial inspection station was established at Killarney about 21 kilometres (13 mi) north of the present crossing. W.J. Cooper was the inaugural customs officer 1889–1895. Under the administrative oversight of the Port of Winnipeg, the office handled goods received by road. In 1899, oversight transferred to the Port of Brandon. Inconveniently located and vulnerable to smuggling, the office moved to the border in 1930, adopting the name of Lena, the nearest post office.

The building was replaced in 1961.

In 2020, the former border hours of 8am–9pm reduced, becoming 8am–4pm.

== US side ==
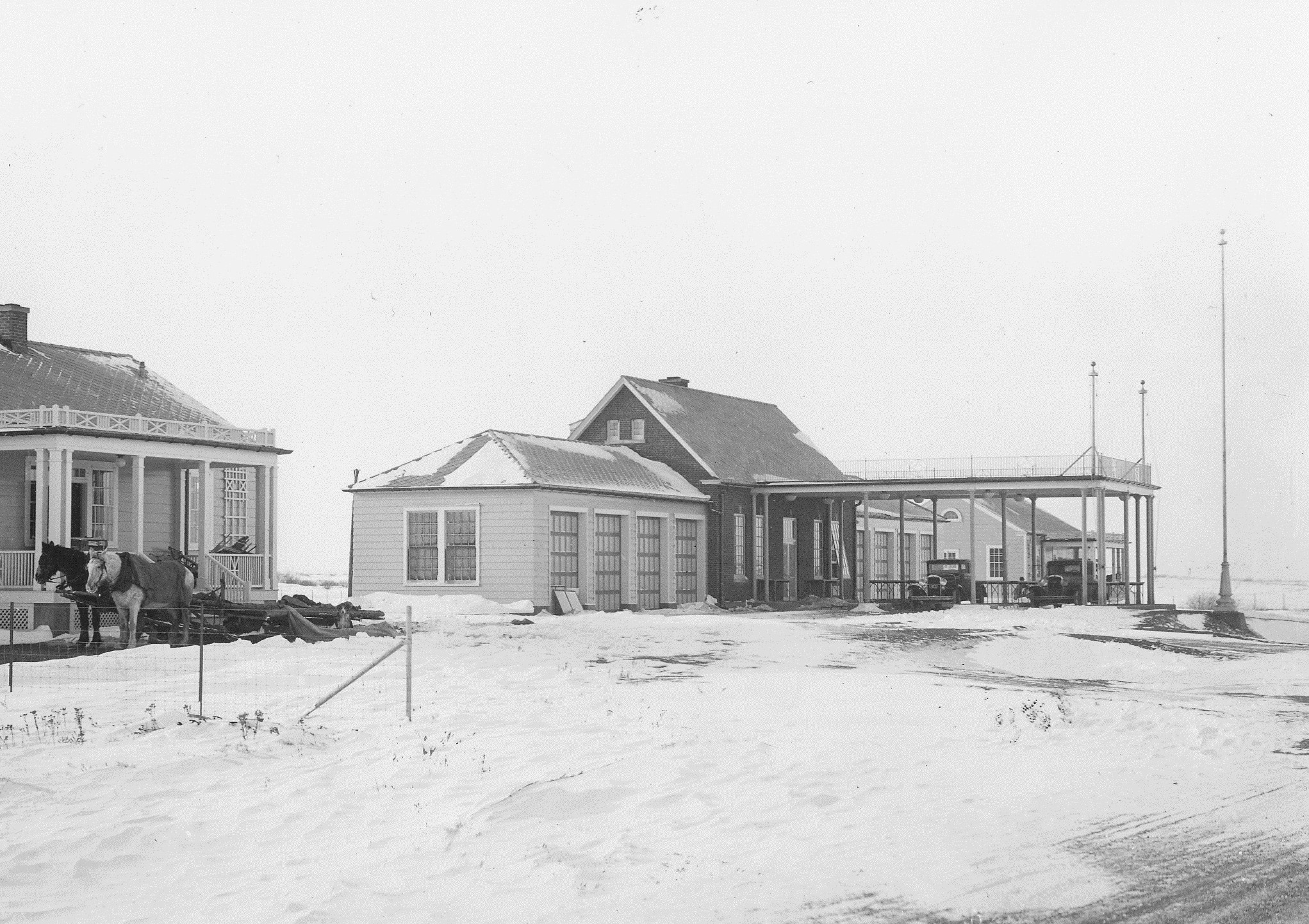
US Border Station at St. John, ND, 1932

The US border station was built in 1937, and was added to the U.S. National Register of Historic Places in 2014.

== See also ==
- List of Canada–United States border crossings
