= St. John, North Dakota =

- City
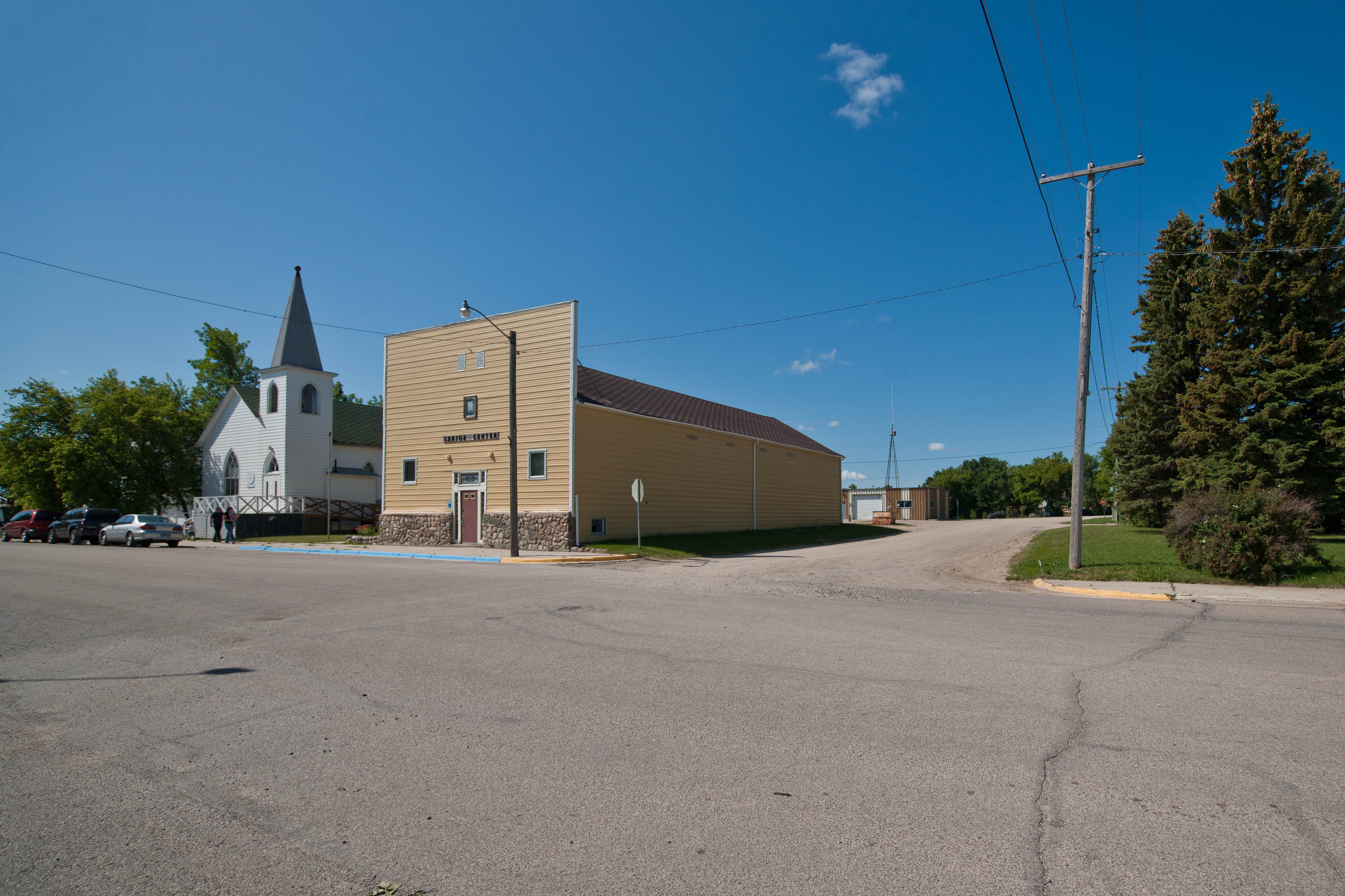
- Senior Center, St. John (July 2009)
- Interactive map of St. John, North Dakota
- Location within North Dakota
- Coordinates: 48.9438°N 99.7131°W
- Country: United States
- State: North Dakota
- County: Rolette
- Founded: 1882
- Incorporated: 1903

Area
  - Total: 0.442 sq mi (1.144 km^{2})
  - Land: 0.442 sq mi (1.144 km^{2})
  - Water: 0 sq mi (0.000 km^{2}) 0.00%
- Elevation: 1,952 ft (595 m)

Population (2020)
  - Total: 322
  - Estimate (2025): 310
  - Density: 729/sq mi (281/km^{2})
- Time zone: UTC–6 (Central (CST))
  - Summer (DST): UTC–5 (CDT)
- ZIP Code: 58369
- Area code: 701
- FIPS code: 38-69980
- GNIS feature ID: 1036251

St. John or Saint John is a city in Rolette County, North Dakota, United States. The population was 322 as of the 2020 census, and was estimated at 310 in 2025. It is by the Canadian border to Manitoba via the St. John–Lena Border Crossing.

== History ==
St. John was laid out in 1882. The town took its name after a parish in Quebec, the native land of a local missionary. St. John was incorporated in 1903. A post office has been in operation in St. John since 1882. An early history of the town of St. John circa 1890 to 1912 can be found here and.

== Geography ==
St. John is the town in the United States closest to one of the few practical exclaves of the US.

According to the United States Census Bureau, the city has a total area of 0.442 square miles (1.14 km^{2}), all land.

== Demographics ==
Historical population
Census	Pop.	Note	%±
1910	424		—
1920	460		8.5%
1930	372		−19.1%
1940	517		39.0%
1950	451		−12.8%
1960	420		−6.9%
1970	367		−12.6%
1980	401		9.3%
1990	368		−8.2%
2000	358		−2.7%
2010	341		−4.7%
2020	322		−5.6%
2025 (est.)	310		−3.7%
U.S. Decennial Census; 2020 Census

=== 2020 census ===
As of the 2020 census, there were 322 people, 133 households, and 80 families residing in the city.

=== 2010 census ===
As of the 2010 census, there were 341 people, 138 households, and 76 families residing in the city. The population density was 757.8 inhabitants per square mile (292.6/km^{2}). There were 151 housing units at an average density of 335.6 units per square mile (129.6 units/km^{2}). The racial makeup of the city was 23.2% White, 0.3% African American, 66.0% Native American, 1.2% Asian, and 9.4% from two or more races. Hispanic or Latino people of any race were 0.9% of the population.

There were 138 households, of which 38.4% had children under the age of 18 living with them, 28.3% were married couples living together, 20.3% had a female householder with no husband present, 6.5% had a male householder with no wife present, and 44.9% were non-families. 42.0% of all households were made up of individuals, and 17.4% had someone living alone who was 65 years of age or older. The average household size was 2.47 and the average family size was 3.37.

The median age in the city was 30.4 years. 30.5% of residents were under the age of 18; 10.8% were between the ages of 18 and 24; 25.8% were from 25 to 44; 22% were from 45 to 64; and 10.9% were 65 years of age or older. The gender makeup of the city was 47.2% male and 52.8% female.

=== 2000 census ===
As of the 2000 census, there were 358 people, 142 households, and 91 families residing in the city. The population density was 1,217.1 inhabitants per square mile (469.9/km^{2}). There were 154 housing units at an average density of 523.6 units per square mile (202.2 units/km^{2}). The racial makeup of the city was 37.99% White, 55.59% Native American, and 6.42% from two or more races. Hispanic or Latino people of any race were 0.84% of the population.

There were 142 households, out of which 36.6% had children under the age of 18 living with them, 37.3% were married couples living together, 21.8% had a female householder with no husband present, and 35.9% were non-families. 33.1% of all households were made up of individuals, and 10.6% had someone living alone who was 65 years of age or older. The average household size was 2.52 and the average family size was 3.18.

In the city, the population was spread out, with 31.6% under the age of 18, 9.8% from 18 to 24, 25.7% from 25 to 44, 20.9% from 45 to 64, and 12.0% who were 65 years of age or older. The median age was 33 years. For every 100 females, there were 86.5 males. For every 100 females age 18 and over, there were 85.6 males.

The median income for a household in the city was $26,250, and the median income for a family was $40,208. Males had a median income of $25,714 versus $17,188 for females. The per capita income for the city was $12,294. About 15.6% of families and 16.2% of the population were below the poverty line, including 18.7% of those under age 18 and 10.5% of those age 65 or over.

== Education ==
The area is served by the St. John School District. It operates the St. John School. In the 2025-26 academic year, the district reported a total of 460 students.

== See also ==
Turtle Mountain Indian Reservation The city of St. John is just outside the boundary of the Turtle Mountain Indian Reservation.
