= Nesbitt, Manitoba =

Coordinates: 49.60074°N 99.86307°W

Nesbitt is a community located in the Municipality of Oakland – Wawanesa, Manitoba, Canada. It was established in 1891 by the Canadian Pacific Railway. Former NHL player Aaron Rome was born and raised here.
