= Rural Municipality of Prairie Lakes =

Rural municipality in Manitoba, Canada

Prairie Lakes
- Rural municipality
- Rural Municipality of Prairie Lakes
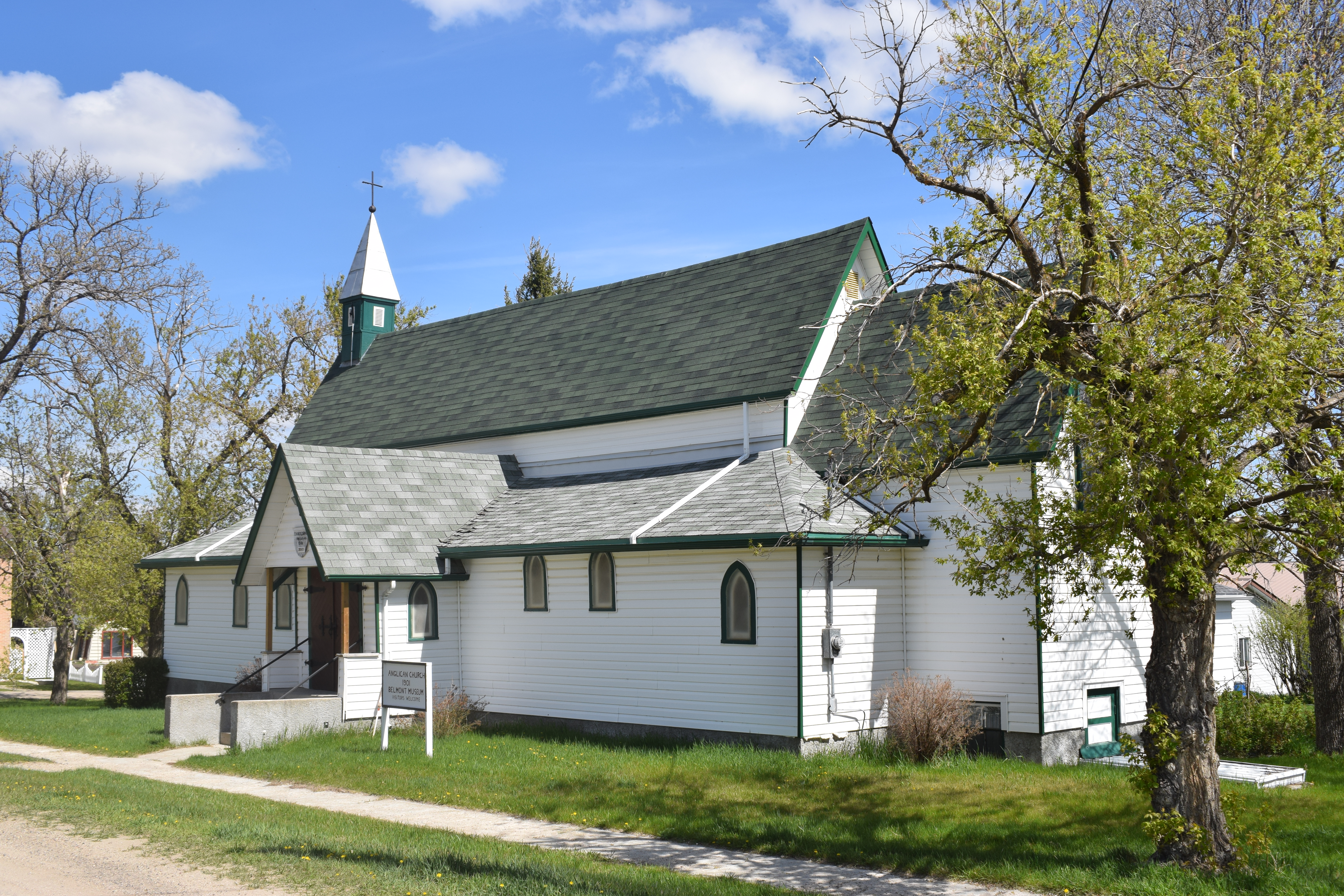
- Belmont Anglican Church in Belmont, Manitoba, located in the Rural Municipality of Prairie Lakes

- Location of the RM of Prairie Lakes in Manitoba
- Coordinates: 49.410°N 99.458°W
- Country: Canada
- Province: Manitoba
- Region: Westman
- Incorporated (amalgamated): January 1, 2015

Area
  - Total: 1,070.95 km^{2} (413.50 sq mi)

Population (2021)
  - Total: 1,625
  - Density: 1.4/km^{2} (3.6/sq mi)
- Time zone: UTC-6 (CST)
  - Summer (DST): UTC-5 (CDT)
- Website: rmofprairielakes.ca

The Rural Municipality of Prairie Lakes is a rural municipality (RM) in the Canadian province of Manitoba. The Rural Municipality of Prairies lakes surrounds most of the north end of Pelican Lake. There are several other lakes in the RM such as Grass Lake, Overend Lake, Bone Lake, Lorne Lake, Louise Lake, Lloyds Lake, Noble Lake and many more that are all much smaller than Pelican Lake.

== History ==
Rural Municipality of Riverside was originally incorporated as a rural municipality on December 22, 1883.

Rural Municipality of Strathcona was originally incorporated as a rural municipality in April 1906.

The Rural Municipality of Prairie Lakes was created on January 1, 2015 via the amalgamation of the RMs of Strathcona and Riverside. It was formed as a requirement of The Municipal Amalgamations Act, which required that municipalities with a population less than 1,000 amalgamate with one or more neighbouring municipalities by 2015. The Government of Manitoba initiated these amalgamations in order for municipalities to meet the 1997 minimum population requirement of 1,000 to incorporate a municipality.

== Geography ==
=== Communities ===
- Belmont
- Dunrea
- Hilton
- Margaret
- Ninette

=== Climate ===
Information listed below is from Environment Canada Belmont Weather station.

Climate data for Belmont, elevation: 481.6 m (1,580 ft), 1981–2010 normals
Month	Jan	Feb	Mar	Apr	May	Jun	Jul	Aug	Sep	Oct	Nov	Dec	Year
Average precipitation mm (inches)	23.6 (0.93)	26.2 (1.03)	27.0 (1.06)	26.3 (1.04)	76.4 (3.01)	96.6 (3.80)	78.3 (3.08)	69.2 (2.72)	39.7 (1.56)	37.3 (1.47)	27.2 (1.07)	30.8 (1.21)	558.6 (21.99)
Average rainfall mm (inches)	0.0 (0.0)	1.2 (0.05)	7.1 (0.28)	15.1 (0.59)	72.5 (2.85)	96.6 (3.80)	78.3 (3.08)	69.2 (2.72)	39.3 (1.55)	29.6 (1.17)	4.0 (0.16)	0.2 (0.01)	413.0 (16.26)
Average snowfall cm (inches)	23.6 (9.3)	25.0 (9.8)	19.9 (7.8)	11.2 (4.4)	3.9 (1.5)	0.0 (0.0)	0.0 (0.0)	0.0 (0.0)	0.4 (0.2)	7.7 (3.0)	23.3 (9.2)	30.6 (12.0)	145.5 (57.3)
Source: Environment Canada

== Demographics ==
In the 2021 Census of Population conducted by Statistics Canada, Prairie Lakes had a population of 1,625 living in 674 of its 1,183 total private dwellings, a change of 11.8% from its 2016 population of 1,453. With a land area of 1,070.95 km^{2} (413.50 sq mi), it had a population density of 1.5/km^{2} (3.9/sq mi) in 2021.

== See also ==
- Pelican Lake
- RM of Killarney-Turtle Mountain
