= Municipality of Killarney-Turtle Mountain =

Rural municipality in Manitoba, Canada

Killarney-Turtle Mountain
- Rural municipality
- Municipality of Killarney-Turtle Mountain
- Location of the Municipality of Killarney-Turtle Mountain in Manitoba
- Coordinates: 49°10′39″N 99°41′26″W
- Country: Canada
- Province: Manitoba
- Region: Westman

Government
  - Mayor: Janice Smith
  - MLA: Doyle Piwniuk

Area
  - Land: 926.14 km^{2} (357.58 sq mi)

Population (2021)
  - Total: 3,429
- Time zone: UTC-6 (CST)
  - Summer (DST): UTC-5 (CDT)
- Area codes: 204 and 431
- Website: killarney.ca

Killarney-Turtle Mountain is a rural municipality (RM) located in the Westman Region of Manitoba, Canada. It is located to the immediate north of the Canada–United States border opposite Rollete and Towner Counties, North Dakota.

== History ==
Prior to permanent settlement, the area of current-day Municipality of Killarney-Turtle Mountain was well known by fur traders, explorers, and Indigenous peoples who lived and trapped along the northern edge of the Turtle Mountains. The first permanent settlers were homesteaders from different parts of the world.

Land surveyor and homesteader John Sydney O’Brien named the adjoining lake "Killarney" after the Irish town, because the landscape reminded him of home. He then baptized the lake.

In the late 1800s, a community was quickly forming near Killarney Lake.

During that time, the Boundary Commission Trail ran through the southern part of the area. The North-West Mounted Police used the trail as they travelled west to the Rockies in an effort to tame the prairies. Prior to this time, the area was home to many Indigenous people, as well as hunters and trappers taking part in the fur trade.

The Rural Municipality of Turtle Mountain was incorporated on August 15, 1882. The following year, the community's first store was built, and the first Council meeting was held.

In 1885, the railway came through and by the following decade the population grew to 300 people. On December 1, 1903, Killarney was incorporated as a village, breaking away from the RM of Turtle Mountain.

On January 1, 2007, the Rural Municipality of Turtle Mountain and the Town of Killarney amalgamated back together to form the Municipality of Killarney-Turtle Mountain.

== Communities ==
- Bannerman
- Enterprise
- Holmfield
- Killarney
- Lena
- Ninga
- Rhodes
- Wakopa

== Demographics ==
In the 2021 Census of Population conducted by Statistics Canada, Killarney - Turtle Mountain had a population of 3,520 living in 1,446 of its 1,689 total private dwellings, a change of 2.7% from its 2016 population of 3,429. With a land area of 930.02 km^{2} (359.08 sq mi), it had a population density of 3.8/km^{2} (9.8/sq mi) in 2021.

In the 2011 Census, the Municipality of Killarney-Turtle Mountain had a population of 3,233 living in 1,347 of its 1,589 total dwellings, a -2.0% change from its 2006 population of 3,299. With a land area of 925.13 km^{2} (357.19 sq mi), it had a population density of 3.5/km^{2} (9.1/sq mi) in 2011.

== See also ==
- Killarney
- St. John–Lena Border Crossing
- Turtle Mountain (plateau)
- Turtle Mountain Provincial Park
- Turtle Mountain (electoral district)
