= Manitoba Provincial Road 201 =

Provincial road in Manitoba, Canada

Provincial Road 201
- PR 201 highlighted in red

Route information
- Maintained by Manitoba Infrastructure
- Length: 218 km (135 mi)
- Existed: 1966–present

Major junctions
- West end: PR 242 near Snowflake
- PTH 31 near Windygates; PTH 32 near Osterwick; PTH 30 at Altona; PTH 75 at Letellier; PTH 59 near Tolstoi
- East end: PTH 89 near Piney

Location
- Country: Canada
- Province: Manitoba
- Rural municipalities: Emerson – Franklin; Montcalm; Pembina; Piney; Rhineland; Stuartburn; Stanley
- Towns: Altona

Highway system
- Provincial highways in Manitoba; Winnipeg City Routes
← PR 200	→ PR 202

Provincial Road 201 (PR 201) is an east–west provincial road in southern Manitoba, Canada. The road runs parallel to Manitoba's border with the United States for a distance of 218 kilometres (135 mi), nearly half the province's length.

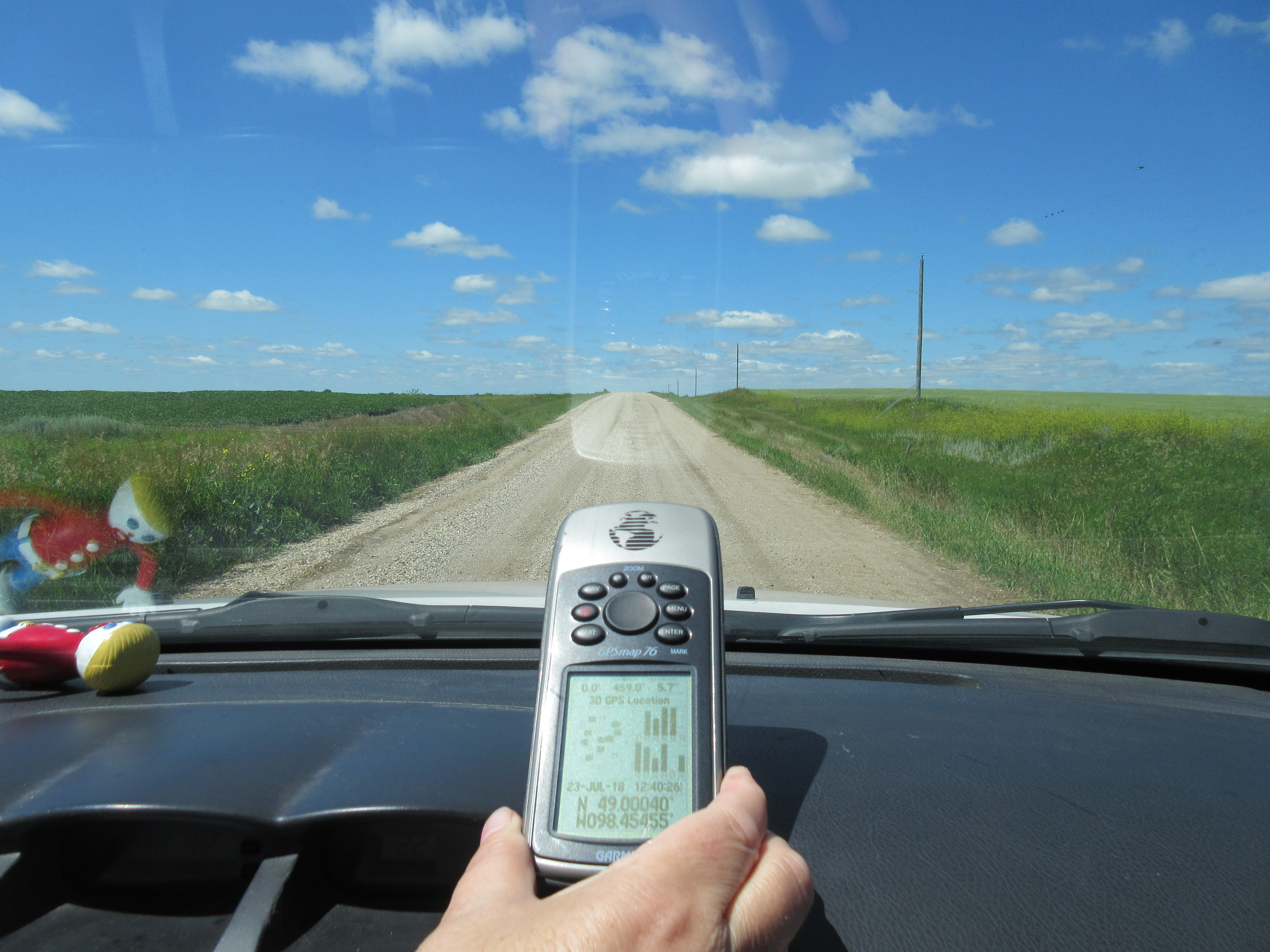
Part of Manitoba Provincial Road 201, near the border with the US, just east of Snowflake. The road runs within metres of the border, with no signage to alert motorists.

== Route description ==
PR 201 begins near Snowflake, approximately 5 kilometres north of the border. The western section of the road is gravel and runs a jagged line, at one point running along the border. Just east of Provincial Trunk Highway (PTH) 31, it passes by Pembina Valley Provincial Park. At Osterwick, PR 201 becomes a paved, two-lane highway and continues due east through the town of Altona to PTH 75 at Letellier. East of Letellier, it crosses over the Red River and passes through the Roseau River Anishinabe First Nation Indian reserve. From there, it continues east, crosses PTH 59, before ending at PTH 89, just short distance south of its junction with PTH 12.

=== Communities along PR 201 ===
- Snowflake
- Osterwick
- Altona
- Letellier
- Ginew
- Dominion City
- Stuartburn
- Vita
- Sundown

== Major intersections ==
Division	Location	km	mi	Destinations	Notes
Pembina	Snowflake	0.0	0.0	PR 242 – Hannah, La Rivière	Western terminus; road continues west as Road 3N; PR 242 connects to the Hannah-Snowflake Border Crossing; west end of unpaved section
Pembina	Snowflake	1.1	0.68	Railway Avenue – Snowflake	
Pembina		7.6	4.7	Bridge over Snowflake Creek	
Pembina	Mowbray	20.3	12.6	Bridge over Mowbray Creek	
Pembina		28.9	18.0	PTH 31 – Langdon, Darlingford	Connects to the Maida-Windygates Border Crossing
Pembina	Pembina Valley Provincial Park	36.5	22.7	Holo Crossing of the Pembina River	
Stanley		48.4	30.1	PR 432 north – Morden	Southern terminus of PR 432
Stanley	Osterwick	63.0	39.1	Seymour Street	East end of unpaved section
Stanley	Hochfeld	67.9	42.2	PTH 32 south (Boundary Commission Trail) – Hochfeld; Road 6N – Neuenberg	Western end of PTH 32 and Boundary Commission Trail concurrency (overlap)
Stanley		66.0	41.0	PTH 32 north (Boundary Commission Trail) – Winkler	Eastern end of PTH 32 and Boundary Commission Trail concurrency
Rhineland		74.5	46.3	Road 18W – Friedensruh	
Rhineland	Gnadenthal	79.4	49.3	Road 15W – Gnadenthal, Blumengart	
Rhineland		82.7	51.4	PR 306 – Plum Coulee, Rosetown	
Rhineland		93.3	58.0	Bridge over the Buffalo Channel	
Rhineland	Altona	97.5	60.6	PTH 30 south – Gretna	Western end of PTH 30 concurrency
Rhineland		100.8	62.6	PTH 30 north – Rosenfeld	Eastern end of PTH 30 concurrency
Montcalm	St. Joseph	112.4	69.8	PR 426 north (Morin Street) – St. Jean Baptiste	Southern terminus of PR 426; former PR 246 north
Montcalm	Letellier	118.7	73.8	PTH 75 (Lord Selkirk Highway) – Winnipeg, Emerson	
Montcalm	Letellier	119.7	74.4	Bridge over the Marais River	
Montcalm / Roseau River Anishinabe First Nation Boundary	Letellier / Ginew Boundary	122.4– 122.7	76.1– 76.2	Bridge over the Red River	
Emerson-Franklin	Dominion City	128.9	80.1	PR 200 north – Ste. Agathe	Western end of PR 200 concurrency
Emerson-Franklin	Dominion City	129.7	80.6	Centennial Drive – Dominion City	
Emerson-Franklin	Dominion City	130.5	81.1	PR 200 south – Emerson	Eastern end of PR 200 concurrency
Emerson-Franklin	Green Ridge	140.3	87.2	PR 218 south – Ridgeville	Western end of PR 218 concurrency
Emerson-Franklin	Green Ridge	142.0	88.2	PR 218 north – Green Ridge, Carlowrie	Eastern end of PR 218 concurrency
Emerson-Franklin		155.1	96.4	PTH 59 – St. Malo, Tolstoi	
Stuartburn	Stuartburn	158.2	98.3	Bridge over the Roseau River	
Stuartburn		164.9	102.5	PR 209 west – Gardenton	Eastern terminus of PR 209
Stuartburn		174.8	108.6	Arbakka Road (Road 41 East) – Arbakka	
Stuartburn		175.6	109.1	PR 302 north – Steinbach	Southern terminus of PR 302
Stuartburn	Caliento	182.8	113.6	Road 9N – Caliento	
Stuartburn	Sundown	196.3	122.0	Road 53E – Steinbach	
Piney	Menisino	207.1	128.7	Main Street – Menisino	
Piney	Sandilands Provincial Forest	210.4	130.7	Access road to Spur Woods Heritage Reserve Monument	
Piney		218	135	PTH 89 to PTH 12 – Piney, Steinbach	Eastern terminus; 0.1 kilometres (0.062 mi) from PTH 89's intersection with PTH 12
1.000 mi = 1.609 km; 1.000 km = 0.621 mi: Concurrency terminus
