= Manitoba Highway 14 =

Provincial road in Manitoba, Canada

Provincial Trunk Highway 14
- PTH 14 highlighted in red
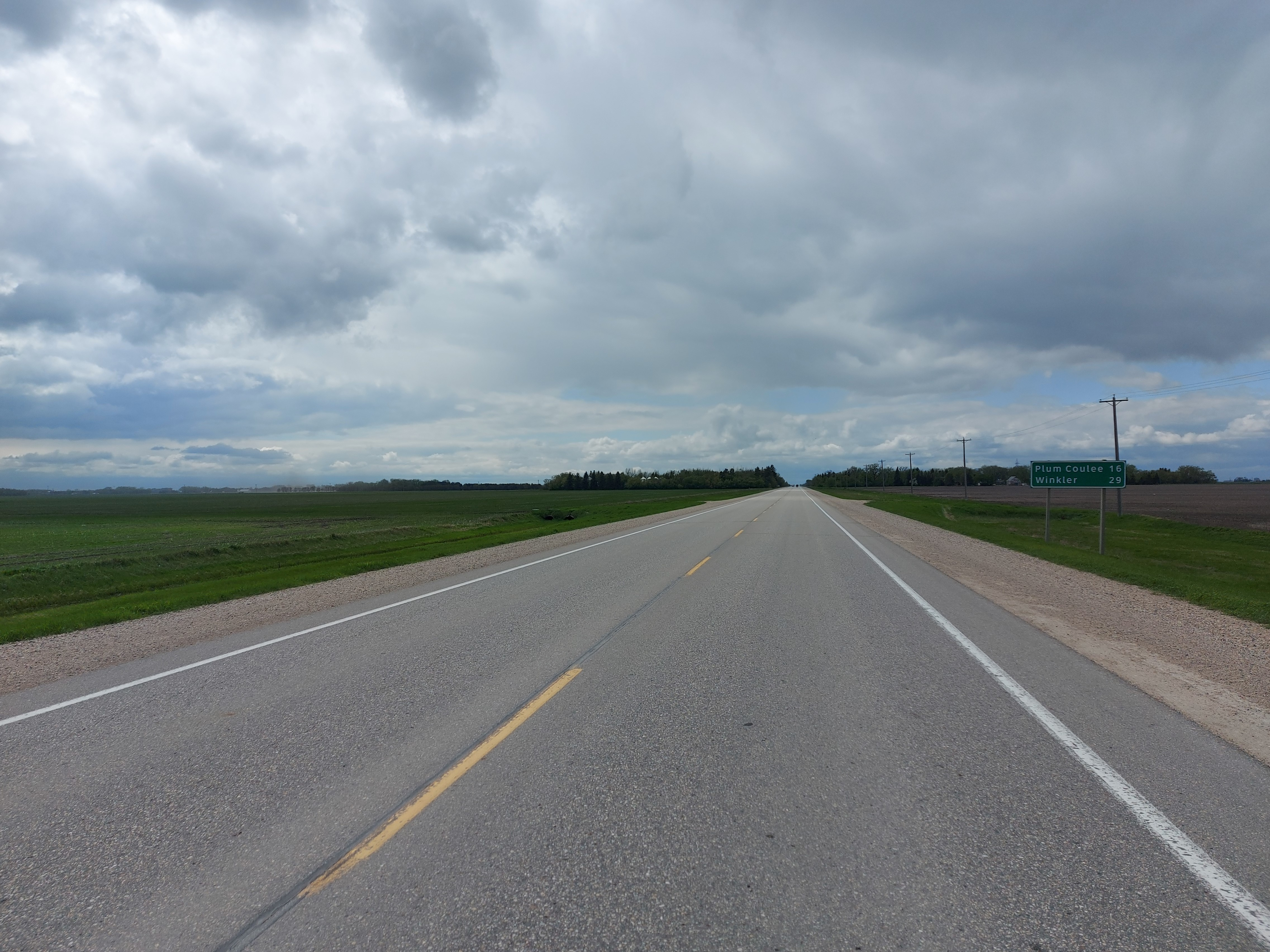
- Highway 14 east of Winkler

Route information
- Maintained by Manitoba Infrastructure
- Length: 50.2 km (31.2 mi)
- Existed: 1950–present

Major junctions
- West end: PTH 3 near Winkler
- PTH 32 in Winkler; PTH 30 in Rosenfeld
- East end: PTH 75 (Lord Selkirk Highway) near Letellier

Location
- Country: Canada
- Province: Manitoba
- Rural municipalities: Stanley; Rhineland; Montcalm
- Major cities: Winkler

Highway system
- Provincial highways in Manitoba; Winnipeg City Routes
← PTH 13	→ PTH 15

Provincial Highway 14 (PTH 14) is a provincial highway in the Canadian province of Manitoba. PTH 14 is a 2 lane high-speed rural highway (100 km/h) and carries relatively high traffic volumes of approximately 1800 vehicles per day. The route extends west to east from its junction with PTH 3 to its junction with PTH 75, the Lord Selkirk Highway.

== Route description ==
PTH 14 begins in the Rural Municipality of Stanley at an intersection with PTH 3 (Boundary Commission Trail), with the road heading east in the city of Winkler as a 4-lane divided highway. The highway passes along the northern side of the city, travelling through neighbourhoods and a business district, where it junctions with PTH 32 (Boundary Commission Trail) and PR 428, before narrowing to two lanes and leaves Winkler. PTH 14 travels along the northern edge of Reinfeld, where it has an intersection with Reinfeld Street, before crossing into the Rural Municipality of Rhineland.

PTH 14 passed through the town of Plum Coulee, where it crosses a canal and has an intersection with PR 306, before travelling due east through Horndean and Rosenfeld, where it has a junction between PTH 30 and PR 332. The highway crosses into the Rural Municipality of Montcalm to have a junction with PR 426 near St. Joseph before coming to an end a few kilometres later at a junction with PTH 75 (Lord Selkirk Highway).

Between its western terminus at PTH 3 to its junction with PTH 32 in Winkler, PTH 14 forms part of the Boundary Commission Trail.

== History ==
Prior to 1949, Highway 14 was the designation of the highway from Winnipeg to Emerson, which is now PTH 75.

PTH 14 was designated to its current route in 1950.

== Major intersections ==
Division	Location	km	mi	Destinations	Notes
Stanley		0	0.0	PTH 3 (Boundary Commission Trail) – Morden, Carman, Winnipeg	Through traffic follows PTH 3 west; Boundary Commission Trail follows PTH 3 west
City of Winkler		5	3.1	PTH 32 south / PR 428 north (Boundary Commission Trail) – Roland, Walhalla	Boundary Commission Trail follows PTH 32 south
Rhineland		18.5	11.5	PR 306 – Plum Coulee, Myrtle, Rosetown	
Rhineland	Horndean			Road 9 West - Kane	former PR 336
Rhineland		33.6	20.9	PTH 30 south / PR 332 north – Rosenfeld, Altona, Gretna	
Montcalm		45.5	28.3	PR 426 south – St. Joseph	former PR 246
Montcalm		50.2	31.2	PTH 75 – Winnipeg, Emerson	former PTH 14
1.000 mi = 1.609 km; 1.000 km = 0.621 mi
