= Manitoba Provincial Road 306 =

Provincial Road in Manitoba, Canada

Provincial Road 306
- PR 306 highlighted in red

Route information
- Maintained by Department of Infrastructure
- Length: 36.1 km (22.4 mi)
- Existed: 1992–present

Major junctions
- South end: PR 243 near Rosetown
- PR 201 near Gnadenthal; PTH 14 in Plum Coulee
- North end: PTH 23 near Kane

Location
- Country: Canada
- Province: Manitoba
- Rural municipalities: Rhineland, Roland

Highway system
- Provincial highways in Manitoba; Winnipeg City Routes
← PR 305	→ PR 307

Provincial Road 306 (PR 306) is a 36.1-kilometre-long (22.4 mi) north-south highway in the Pembina Valley Region of Manitoba. It serves as a connection between the communities of Rosetown, Gnadenthal, Plum Coulee, and Kane.

== Route description ==
PR 306 begins in the Municipality of Rhineland at an intersection with PR 243 (Boundary Commission Trail), just 3 kilometres (1.9 mi) north of the hamlet of Neuhorst and the United States border. It heads north as a paved two-lane highway to almost immediately travel through the Rosetown community before continuing north through rural farmland for several kilometres. After crossing a small creek, the highway has a junction with PR 201 just east of the town of Gnadenthal before continuing on to enter the town of Plum Coulee at an intersection with PTH 14. PR 306 mainly travels through neighbourhoods along the eastern side of town, where it crosses a bridge over the Plum River, before leaving Plum Coulee and crossing a floodway, where the pavement turns to gravel. The highway travels through rural farmland as it enters the Rural Municipality of Roland, crossing two more floodways before coming to an end at an intersection with PTH 23, just west of the community of Kane.

== History ==
Provincial Route 306
- Location: Glass - Garson
- Length: 21.7 km (13.5 mi)
- Existed: 1966–1990

PR 306 was originally designated along what is now Dundee-Garson Road in the Rural Municipalities of Springfield and Brokenhead in the Eastman Region. It began in the Rural Municipality of Springfield at an intersection with PTH 15 (Dugald Road) just west of Anola, heading north to cross PR 213 at Hazelridge. After travelling through Sapton, the highway entered the Rural Municipality of Brokenhead and the town of Garson soon after along Gillis Street. PR 306 travelled along the eastern side of town before coming to an end at an intersection with PTH 44. This section became a municipal road by 1990. PR 306 was designated along its current alignment in 1992, which was part of a southerly extension of PR 248 prior to.

== Major intersections ==
Division	Location	km	mi	Destinations	Notes
Rhineland		0.0	0.0	PR 243 (Boundary Commission Trail) – Gretna, Reinland	Southern terminus; road continues south as Road 13W
Rhineland	Rosetown	1.6	0.99	Road 3N – Rosetown	
Rhineland		8.2	5.1	PR 201 – Gnadenthal, Altona	
Rhineland	Plum Coulee	17.3	10.7	PTH 14 – Winkler, Rosenfeld	
Rhineland	Plum Coulee	17.7	11.0	Bridge over the Plum River	
Rhineland	Plum Coulee	18.6	11.6	Pavement ends	
Rhineland		19.5	12.1	Bridge over the Deadhorse Creek Floodway	
Roland		32.8	20.4	Bridge over Shannon Creek Floodway	
Roland		35.3	21.9	Bridge over Floodway	
Roland		36.1	22.4	PTH 23 – Roland, Morris	Northern terminus; road continues as Road 13W
1.000 mi = 1.609 km; 1.000 km = 0.621 mi
