= Manitoba Provincial Road 243 =

Provincial road in Manitoba, Canada

Provincial Road 243
- Boundary Commission Trail
- PR 243 highlighted in red

Route information
- Maintained by Manitoba Infrastructure
- Length: 53.2 km (33.1 mi)
- Existed: 1966–present

Major junctions
- East end: PTH 75 / PR 200 in Emerson
- PTH 30 near Gretna
- West end: PTH 32 near Friedensfeld West

Location
- Country: Canada
- Province: Manitoba
- Rural municipalities: Emerson – Franklin; Montcalm; Rhineland; Stanley

Highway system
- Provincial highways in Manitoba; Winnipeg City Routes
← PR 242	→ PR 244

Provincial Road 243 (PR 243) is an east-west provincial road in the Pembina Valley Region of the Canadian province of Manitoba. It runs from PTH 75 near Emerson to PTH 32 near Friedensfeld West. Along the route, it passes north of Gretna using a small concurrence with PTH 30.

PR 243 is one of the southernmost east-west highways in the province, and travels in very close proximity to the Canada - US border. During the entire route, the highway travels no more than 6 kilometres (4 mi) from the international boundary. Together with portions of PTH 3 and PTH 32, PR 243 forms the Boundary Commission Trail heading west from Emerson to the Saskatchewan border.

PR 243 is paved between Gretna and its western terminus. The road is gravel between Gretna and Emerson.

== Route description ==
PR 243 begins in the Rural Municipality of Stanley at an intersection with PTH 32 just south of the hamlet of Friedensfeld West, with the road continuing west towards Blumenfeld as Road 3N. It heads due east as a paved two-lane highway to travel through the community of Reinland, where it makes a couple of sharp turns, meets PR 521 on the border with Rosengart, and enters the Municipality of Rhineland.

PR 243 travels past the hamlets of Schoenwiese, Rosetown (where it has a junction with PR 306), Kronsthal, and Neuhorst on its way to meet its spur route, PR 524, which connects the highway to the hamlet of Blumenort South. The highway now has a short concurrency (overlap) with PTH 30 on the northern edge of Gretna, where it turns to gravel, before traveling past the hamlets of Edenburg and Halbstadt just prior to passing through a short section of the Rural Municipality of Montcalm.

PR 243 enters the Municipality of Emerson - Franklin and comes to an end at an intersection between PTH 75 (Lord Selkirk Highway) and PR 200 (King Street), just within the town limits of Emerson. The entire length of Provincial Road 243 is a two-lane highway and corresponds to the easternmost section of the Boundary Commission Trail, with the trail continuing west along PTH 32 north towards Winkler.

== Major intersections ==
Division	Location	km	mi	Destinations	Notes
Stanley		0.0	0.0	PTH 32 (Boundary Commission Trail west) – Winkler, Walhalla, North Dakota; Road 3N – Blumenfeld	Western terminus; Boundary Commission Trail follows PTH 32 north; road continues as Road 3N
Stanley / Rhineland boundary	Reinland / Rosengart boundary	6.5	4.0	PR 521 west – Rosengart	Eastern terminus of PR 521
Rhineland	Schoenwiese	9.5	5.9	Schoenwiese Street – Schoenwiese	
Rhineland		14.7	9.1	PR 306 north – Rosetown	Southern terminus of PR 306
Rhineland		16.3	10.1	Road 12W – Kronsthal, Neuhorst	
Rhineland		22.9	14.2	PR 524 south – Blumenort South	Northern terminus of PR 524
Rhineland		29.4	18.3	PTH 30 north – Altona	Western end of PTH 30 concurrency
Rhineland		31.1	19.3	PTH 30 south – Gretna, Neche-Gretna Border Crossing	Eastern end of PTH 30 concurrency; western end of unpaved section
Rhineland		44.2	27.5	Road 4E – Halbstadt	Former PR 522 north
Montcalm	No major junctions				
Emerson-Franklin	Emerson	53.2	33.1	PTH 75 (Lord Selkirk Highway) – Winnipeg, Fargo, North Dakota, Grand Forks, North Dakota, Pembina-Emerson Border Crossing; PR 200 north (King Street) – Emerson	Eastern terminus of PR 243 and Boundary Commission Trail; southern terminus of PR 200; eastern end of unpaved section
1.000 mi = 1.609 km; 1.000 km = 0.621 mi: Concurrency terminus

== Related route ==
Provincial Road 524
- Blumenort Avenue
- Location: Blumenort South
- Length: 4.5 km (2.8 mi)
- Existed: 1966–present

Provincial Road 524 (PR 524) is a short 4.5-kilometre-long (2.8 mi) north-south spur of PR 243 in the Municipality of Rhineland, Manitoba, connecting the highway to the hamlet of Blumenort South, located only 0.3 kilometres (0.19 mi) north of the United States border. It is a paved two-lane highway for its entire length. Within Blumenort South, PR 524 is known as Blumenort Avenue.

Division	Location	km	mi	Destinations	Notes
Rhineland	Blumenort South	0.0	0.0	Road 9W	Southern terminus
Rhineland		4.5	2.8	PR 243 (Boundary Commission Trail) – Reinland, Gretna	Northern terminus; road continues north as Road 8W
1.000 mi = 1.609 km; 1.000 km = 0.621 mi
