= Manitoba Highway 32 =

Highway in Manitoba

Provincial Trunk Highway 32
- Boundary Commission Trail
- PTH 30 highlighted in red

Route information
- Maintained by Department of Infrastructure
- Length: 23 km (14 mi)
- Existed: 1957–present

Major junctions
- South end: ND 32 at the U.S. border near Reinland
- PR 243 near Friedensfeld West; PR 201 at Hochfeld
- North end: PTH 14 / PR 428 at Winkler

Location
- Country: Canada
- Province: Manitoba
- Rural municipalities: Stanley
- Major cities: Winkler

Highway system
- Provincial highways in Manitoba; Winnipeg City Routes
← PTH 31	→ PTH 34

Provincial Trunk Highway 32 (PTH 32) is a provincial primary highway located in the Canadian province of Manitoba. It runs from PTH 14 at Winkler to the U.S. border, where it becomes North Dakota State Highway 32. Between its northern end and its intersection with PR 243, PTH 32 follows the Boundary Commission Trail.

The speed limit is 100 km/h from Winkler to just north of the US border, and 50 km/h inside the city of Winkler and in the border/customs area.

Provincial Trunk Highway 32 was ranked the 3rd worst road in all of Manitoba in 2013.

== Route description ==
PTH 32 begins in the Rural Municipality of Stanley at the North Dakota border, with the road continuing south towards Walhalla as North Dakota Highway 32 (ND 32). It almost immediately goes through a switchback, where it has a junction with PR 521, which provides access to Rosengart. The highway crosses a creek and heads north, joining the Boundary Commission Trail at an intersection with PR 243 and traveling through Friedensfeld West, Hochfeld (where it has a short concurrency (overlap) with PR 201), and Schanzfeld. PTH 32 enters the city of Winkler, following 1st Street through neighborhoods and a major business district on the east side of downtown, crossing some railroad tracks and coming to an end shortly thereafter at a junction with PTH 14, with the road continuing north as PR 428 towards Roland. The Boundary Commission Trail follows PTH 14 west towards PTH 3.

The entire length of Manitoba Highway 32 is a paved, two-lane highway.

== Major intersections ==
Division	Location	km	mi	Destinations	Notes
Stanley		0	0.0	ND 32 south – Walhalla	Continuation into North Dakota
Stanley		0	0.0	Canada–United States border at the Walhalla–Winkler Border Crossing	
Stanley		3	1.9	PR 521 east	
Stanley		7	4.3	PR 243 east (Boundary Commission Trail east) – Gretna, Emerson	Southern end of Boundary Commission Trail concurrency
Stanley		11	6.8	PR 201 west – Osterwick	South end of PR 201 east concurrency
Stanley		12	7.5	PR 201 east – Altona, Gnadenthal	North end of PR 201 east concurrency
City of Winkler		23	14	PTH 14 (Boundary Commission Trail west) – Morden, Plum Coulee PR 428 north – Roland	Continues as PR 428; Boundary Commission Trail follows PTH 14 west
1.000 mi = 1.609 km; 1.000 km = 0.621 mi: Concurrency terminus; Route transition

== Related route ==
Provincial Road 521
- Location: Rosengart
- Length: 5.5 km (3.4 mi)
- Existed: 1966–present

Provincial Road 521 (PR 521) is an east–west spur of PTH 32 in the Rural Municipalities of Stanley and Rhineland in the Pembina Valley Region of the province, located only 1.7 kilometres (1.1 mi) north of the United States border. It is an unpaved gravel two-lane road in its entirety. It provides access to the community of Rosengart.

Division	Location	km	mi	Destinations	Notes
Stanley		0.0	0.0	PTH 32 – Winkler, Walhalla, ND	Western terminus; provides access to the Walhalla-Winkler Border Crossing
Stanley / Rhineland boundary	Rosengart	3.9	2.4	Road 1NW – Rosengart	
Stanley / Rhineland boundary	Rosengart	4.9	3.0	Rosengart Street – Rosengart	
Stanley / Rhineland boundary	Rosengart / Reinland boundary	5.5	3.4	PR 243 (Boundary Commission Trail) – Reinland, Gretna	Eastern terminus
1.000 mi = 1.609 km; 1.000 km = 0.621 mi
