= Manitoba Highway 30 =

Provincial highway in Manitoba

Provincial Trunk Highway 30
- PTH 30 highlighted in red

Route information
- Maintained by Department of Infrastructure
- Length: 25 km (16 mi)
- Existed: 1968–present

Major junctions
- South end: ND 18 at the U.S. border in Gretna
- North end: PTH 14 / PR 332 north at Rosenfeld

Location
- Country: Canada
- Province: Manitoba
- Rural municipalities: Rhineland
- Towns: Altona

Highway system
- Provincial highways in Manitoba; Winnipeg City Routes
← PTH 27	→ PTH 31

Provincial Trunk Highway 30 (PTH 30) is a provincial highway in the Canadian province of Manitoba. It runs from the Neche–Gretna Border Crossing at the Canada–United States border (where it meets with North Dakota Highway 18) to PTH 14.

The highway connects the U.S. border and PTH 14 to the town of Altona. The speed limit is 100 km/h (62 mph).

== Route description ==
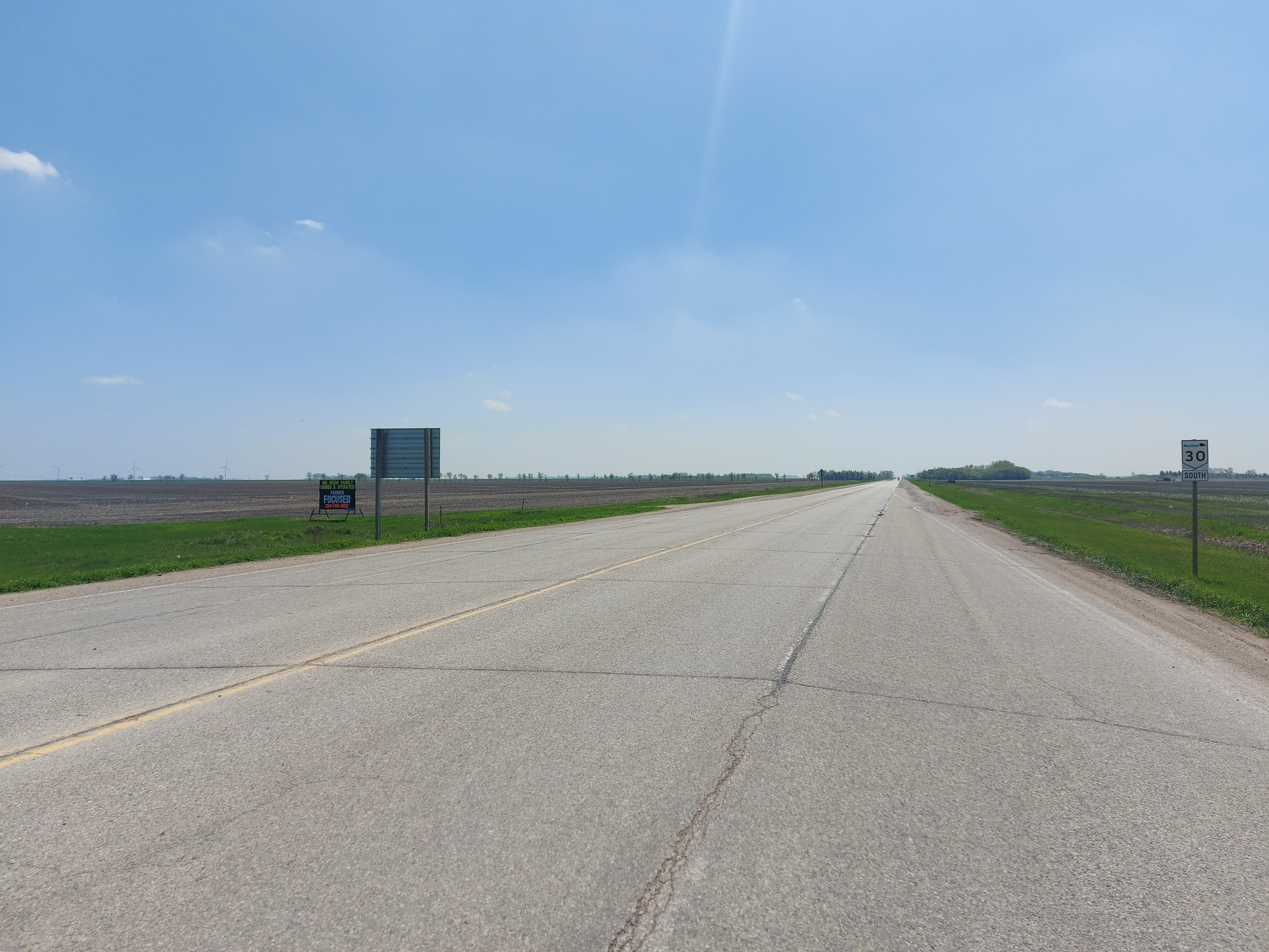
Provincial Trunk Highway 30

PTH 30 begins at the North Dakota on the south side of Gretna, with the road continuing south towards Neche and Cavalier as North Dakota Highway 18 (ND 18). It almost immediately makes a sharp right, curving northward around the eastern side of Gretna, having an intersection with Hespeler Avenue. The highway leaves Gretna and heads due north, having a short concurrency (overlap) with PR 243 (Boundary Commission Trail) on its way to pass by Gnadenfeld, where it junctions with PR 421, and enter the town of Altona. PTH 30 mostly bypasses the town along its eastern side, travelling through neighbourhoods and past a few businesses, where it becomes concurrent with PR 201 (Central Avenue E). The two continue north to leave Altona, with PR 201 splitting off shortly thereafter and PTH 30 continues north for a few kilometres through farmland, crossing the Buffalo Channel, to the southern edge of Rosenfeld, where the designation comes to an end at an intersection with PTH 14. The road continues north into central Rosenfeld as PR 332 (Main Street).

The entire length of Manitoba Highway 30 is a rural, paved, two-lane highway. It resides completely in the Rural Municipality of Rhineland, with the exception of the section in Altona.

== History ==
PTH 30 was known as PTH 14A before receiving its current designation in 1968.

== Major intersections ==
Division	Location	km	mi	Destinations	Notes
Rhineland	Gretna	0	0.0	ND 18 south – Cavalier	Continuation into North Dakota
Rhineland	Gretna	0	0.0	Canada–United States border at the Neche–Gretna Border Crossing	
Rhineland		3	1.9	PR 243 east (Boundary Commission Trail) – Emerson	South end of PR 243 concurrency
Rhineland		5	3.1	PR 243 west (Boundary Commission Trail) – Reinland	North end of PR 243 concurrency
Rhineland		10	6.2	PR 421 east – Sommerfeld, Halbstadt	
Town of Altona		14	8.7	PR 201 west (Central Avenue E)	South end of PR 201 concurrency
Rhineland		18	11	PR 201 east – St. Joseph	North end of PR 201 concurrency
Rhineland	Rosenfeld	25	16	PTH 14 – Winkler, PTH 75 PR 332 north (Main Street) – Rosenfeld	Continues as PR 332
1.000 mi = 1.609 km; 1.000 km = 0.621 mi: Concurrency terminus; Route transition
