= Manitoba Provincial Road 428 =

Provincial road in Manitoba, Canada

Provincial Road 428

Route information
- Maintained by Department of Infrastructure
- Length: 18.3 km (11.4 mi)
- Existed: 1966–present

Major junctions
- South end: PTH 14 / PTH 32 in Winkler
- North end: PTH 23 near Roland

Location
- Country: Canada
- Province: Manitoba
- Rural municipalities: Stanley, Roland
- Major cities: Winkler

Highway system
- Provincial highways in Manitoba; Winnipeg City Routes
| ← PR 427 | → PR 430 |

Provincial Road 428 (PR 428) is a 18.3-kilometre-long (11.4 mi) north–south highway in the Pembina Valley Region of Manitoba, connecting the town of Roland with the city of Winkler.

== Route description ==
PR 428 begins in the city of Winkler at an intersection between PTH 14 (Boundary Commission Trail west) and the north end of PTH 32 (1st Street / Boundary Commission Trail east), located in the middle of a major business district just across the street from Southland Mall. It heads north through neighbourhoods to leave Winkler and enter the Rural Municipality of Stanley, travelling through Rosebrook before heading due north through rural farmland. The highway crosses several creeks as it enters the Rural Municipality of Roland, continuing north through farmland for several more kilometres before coming to an end at an intersection with PTH 23 just outside the town of Roland. Excluding at the intersection between PTH 14 and PTH 32, which is a divided four-lane for a short distance, the entire length of PR 428 is a paved two-lane highway.

== Major intersections ==
| Division | Location | km | mi | Destinations | Notes |
|---|---|---|---|---|---|
| City of Winkler | | 0.0 | 0.0 | PTH 14 (Boundary Commission Trail west) – Morris, Morden; PTH 32 south (Boundary Commission Trail east) – Walhalla | Southern terminus, northern terminus of PTH 32 |
| Stanley | No major junctions | | | | |
| Roland | | 18.3 | 11.4 | PTH 23 – Roland, Morris | Northern terminus |
1.000 mi = 1.609 km; 1.000 km = 0.621 mi
