= Manitoba Provincial Road 426 =

Provincial road in Manitoba, Canada

Provincial Road 426
- Morin Street

Route information
- Maintained by Department of Infrastructure
- Length: 6.5 km (4.0 mi)
- Existed: 1994–present

Major junctions
- South end: PR 201 in St. Joseph
- North end: PTH 14 near St. Joseph

Location
- Country: Canada
- Province: Manitoba
- Rural municipalities: Montcalm

Highway system
- Provincial highways in Manitoba; Winnipeg City Routes
← PR 425	→ PR 427

Provincial Road 426 (PR 426) is a 6.5-kilometre-long (4.0 mi) north–south highway in the Pembina Valley Region of Manitoba. Located entirely in the Rural Municipality of Montcalm, it connects PTH 14 with the hamlet of St. Joseph and PR 201.

== Route description ==
PR 426 begins in the centre of St. Joseph at an intersection with PR 201, heading north through town along Morin Street. Leaving St. Joseph, the asphalt transitions to gravel as the highway travels due north through rural farmland for the next several kilometres to come to an end at an intersection with PTH 14, with the road continuing north as Road 3E. The entire length of PR 426 is a two-lane highway.

== History ==
Prior to 1992, PR 246 continued 18.9 kilometres (11.7 mi) southwest from St. Jean Baptiste along Road 18N and Road 3E, crossing PTH 14 along its way to St. Joseph, where it came to an end at an intersection with PR 201. The 6.5 kilometres (4.0 mi) section between PR 201 in St. Joseph and PTH 14 is now known as PR 426, being known as PR 420 between 1994 and 2008.

Provincial Road 426
- Bénard Road, River Road
- Location: Bénard–Poplar Point
- Length: 40.7 km (25.3 mi)
- Existed: 1966–1992

Between 1966 and 1992, PR 426 existed as a 25.3-mile-long (40.7 km) gravel highway in the Central Plains Region, running from PTH 1 (Trans-Canada Highway/Yellowhead Highway) on the northern edge of Bénard to PR 430 just south of Poplar Point. It provided access to the Hutterite colonies of Huron and Poplar Point and another access to St. Eustache, while its most prominent feature was its section along River Road, where it followed the south bank of the Assiniboine River.

== Major intersections ==
Division	Location	km	mi	Destinations	Notes
Montcalm	St. Joseph	0.0	0.0	PR 201 – Letellier, Altona	Southern terminus; road continues south as Morin Street
Montcalm	St. Joseph	0.5	0.31	Northern end of pavement	
Montcalm		6.5	4.0	PTH 14 to PTH 75 – Winkler	Northern terminus; road continues north as Road 3E (former PR 246 north)
1.000 mi = 1.609 km; 1.000 km = 0.621 mi
