= Rural Municipality of Rhineland =

Rural municipality in Manitoba, Canada

Coordinates: 49°07′59″N 97°35′39″W

The Rural Municipality of Rhineland is a former rural municipality (RM) in the Canadian province of Manitoba. Since 1876, the area made up part of the Mennonite West Reserve. The R.M. of Rhineland was originally incorporated as a rural municipality on February 14, 1880 and later absorbed the neighbouring RM of Douglas in January 1891. It ceased on January 1, 2015 as a result of its provincially mandated amalgamation with the towns of Gretna and Plum Coulee to form the Municipality of Rhineland.

The RM was located in the southern part of the province, along its border with the state of North Dakota in the United States. It had a population of 4,125 persons in the 2006 census, a slight decrease from the 4,183 reported in the 2001 Census. There is a national historic site in the former RM's territory at Neubergthal, which was officially designated in 1998 as Neubergthal Street Village.

== Geography ==
According to Statistics Canada, the former RM had an area of 953.42 km^{2} (386.12 sq mi).

=== Communities ===
- Blumenort South
- Gnadenfeld
- Gnadenthal
- Halbstadt
- Horndean
- Kronsthal
- Neubergthal
- Neuhorst
- Rosenfeld
- Rosengart
- Rosetown
- Schoenwiese
- Sommerfeld

=== Adjacent municipalities ===
- Rural Municipality of Stanley - (west)
- Rural Municipality of Roland - (northwest)
- Rural Municipality of Morris - (northeast)
- Rural Municipality of Montcalm - (east)
- Pembina County, North Dakota - (south)
