= Manitoba Provincial Road 218 =

Provincial road in Manitoba, Canada

Provincial Road 218
- PR 200 highlighted in red

Route information
- Maintained by Manitoba Infrastructure
- Length: 45.5 km (28.3 mi)
- Existed: 1966–present

Major junctions
- North end: PTH 59 at St. Malo
- South end: PR 200 near Emerson

Location
- Country: Canada
- Province: Manitoba
- Rural municipalities: De Salaberry; Emerson – Franklin

Highway system
- Provincial highways in Manitoba; Winnipeg City Routes
← PR 217	→ PR 220

Provincial Road 218 (PR 218) is a provincial road in the Eastman Region of southeastern Manitoba, Canada. It connects the community of Ridgeville with the town of St. Malo.

== Route description ==
PR 209 begins at Provincial Trunk Highway 59 in St. Malo and runs in a generally southward direction for 35 kilometres (22 mi). It turns west approximately 3 kilometres (2 mi) north of Canada–United States border and heads west for 10 kilometres (6 mi) before ending at PR 200 near Emerson.

Most of PR 218 is paved, except for the southernmost part between Ridgeville and PR 200, which is a gravel road. This southern section was not originally part of PR 218; it was added in 1992 to replace the partly-decommissioned PR 209.

== Major intersections ==
Division	Location	km	mi	Destinations	Notes
Emerson-Franklin		0.0	0.0	PR 200 – Emerson, Dominion City	Southern terminus; southern end of unpaved section; road continues west as Road 2N
Emerson-Franklin	Ridgeville	13.4	8.3	Northern end of unpaved section at southern limits of Ridgeville	
Emerson-Franklin		14.8	9.2	Road 5N	Former PR 209 east
Emerson-Franklin		21.4	13.3	PR 201 west – Dominion City	Southern end of concurrency (overlap) with PR 201
Emerson-Franklin		23.0	14.3	PR 201 east – Vita	Northern end of PR 201 concurrency
Emerson-Franklin		29.5	18.3	Bridge over the Roseau River	
Emerson-Franklin		36.2	22.5	PR 217 west – Arnaud	Eastern terminus of PR 217
De Salaberry	St. Malo	45.0	28.0	Rue St. Malo – St. Malo	
De Salaberry	St. Malo	45.5	28.3	PTH 59 – St-Pierre-Jolys, Tolstoi	Northern terminus
1.000 mi = 1.609 km; 1.000 km = 0.621 mi: Concurrency terminus
