= Manitoba Provincial Road 209 =

Provincial road in Manitoba, Canada

Provincial Road 209
- PR 209 highlighted in red

Route information
- Maintained by Manitoba Infrastructure
- Length: 14.1 km (8.8 mi)
- Existed: 1966–present

Major junctions
- West end: PTH 59 at Tolstoi
- East end: PR 201 near Stuartburn

Location
- Country: Canada
- Province: Manitoba
- Rural municipalities: Emerson – Franklin; Stuartburn

Highway system
- Provincial highways in Manitoba; Winnipeg City Routes
← PR 207	→ PR 210

Provincial Road 209 (PR 209) is a short 14.1-kilometre-long (8.8 mi) east-west provincial road in the Eastman Region of Manitoba, Canada. It connects the community of Gardenton with PTH 59, as well as PR 201, along with the communities of Tolstoi, Vita, Stuartburn.

== Route description ==
PR 209 begins at Provincial Trunk Highway (PTH) 59 at the south end of Tolstoi, 8.2 kilometres (5.1 mi) north of the Canada–United States border. It runs east for approximately 7.5 kilometres (5 mi), heads northeast for 4 kilometres (2 mi) through Gardenton, crossing the Roseau River, and then north to its end at PR 201 between the communities of Stuartburn and Vita. It is a paved, two-lane road.

== History ==
Prior to 1992, PR 209 extended west from PTH 59 to PR 218 near Ridgeville and then southeast to PR 200 near Emerson. Part of this former section was reassigned to PR 218; the remainder is a municipal road.

== Major intersections ==
Division	Location	km	mi	Destinations	Notes
Emerson-Franklin	Tolstoi	0.0	0.0	PTH 59 (Main Street) – St-Pierre-Jolys, Thief River Falls	Western terminus; road continues west as Railway Avenue
Stuartburn	Gardenton	9.6	6.0	Bridge over the Roseau River	
Stuartburn		14.1	8.8	PR 201 – Stuartburn, Vita	Eastern terminus; road continues north as Reckett School Road
1.000 mi = 1.609 km; 1.000 km = 0.621 mi
