= West Reserve =

Coordinates: 49.0304°N 97.2020°W

- block settlement
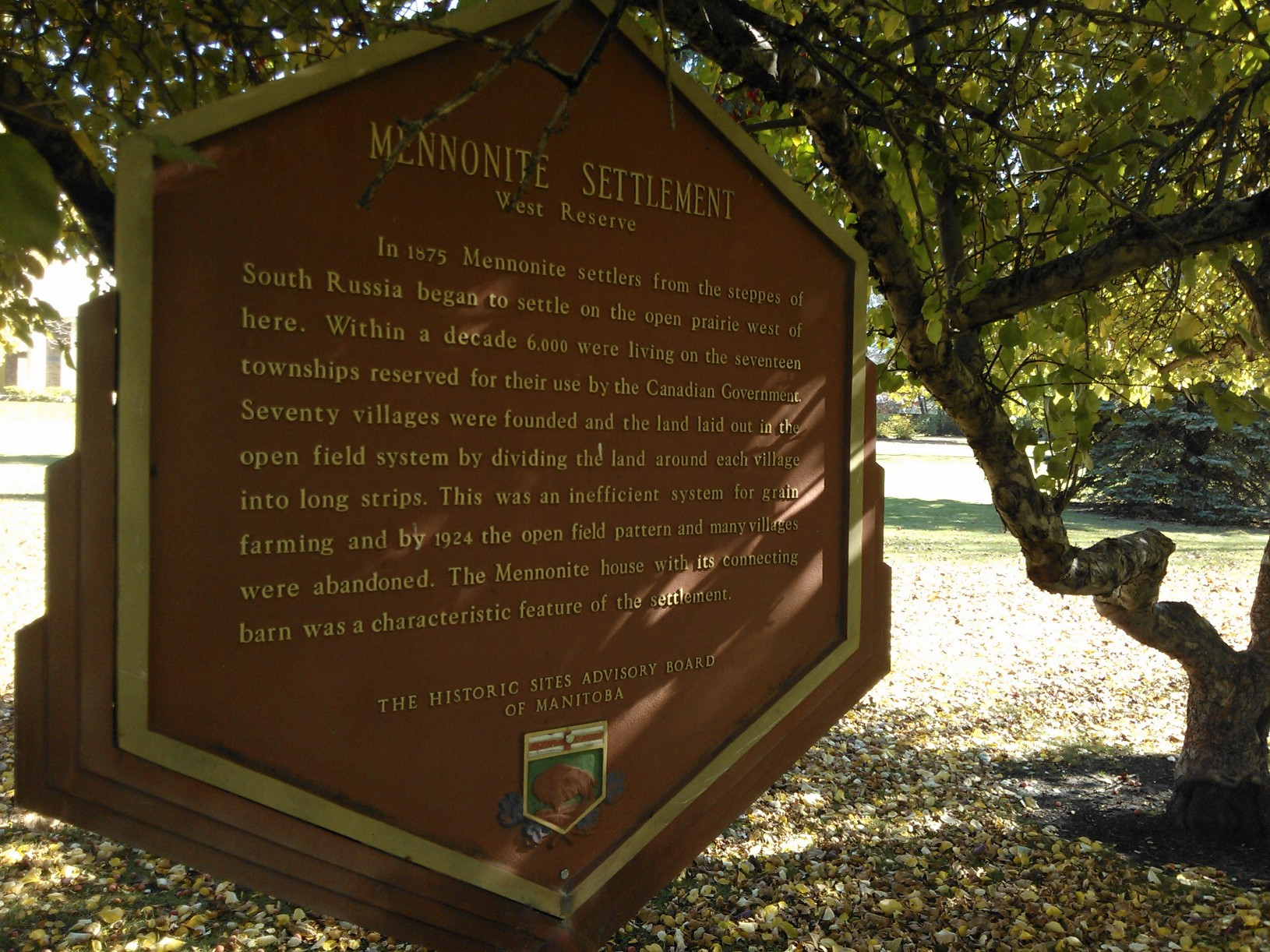
- West Reserve marker in Altona, Manitoba
- Interactive map of West Reserve
- Country: Canada
- Province: Manitoba
- Region: Pembina Valley
- Established: 1875
- Fate: Now part of the RM of Rhineland and RM of Stanley

The West Reserve was a block settlement plot of land in Manitoba set aside by the Government of Canada exclusively for settlement by Russian Mennonite settlers in 1875.

Today, the former West Reserve exists in what is now the Rural Municipalities of Rhineland and Stanley, in the Pembina Valley Region.

== History ==
After signing Treaty 1 with the Anishinabe and Swampy Cree First Nations, the Canadian government sent William Hespeler to recruit Mennonite farmers to the region. In 1873, Mennonite delegates from the Russian Empire (David Klassen, Jacob Peters, Heinrich Wiebe, and Cornelius Toews) visited the area and agreed to a Privilegium outlining religious freedom, military exemption, and land. This land became known as the East Reserve, because it was east of the Red River.

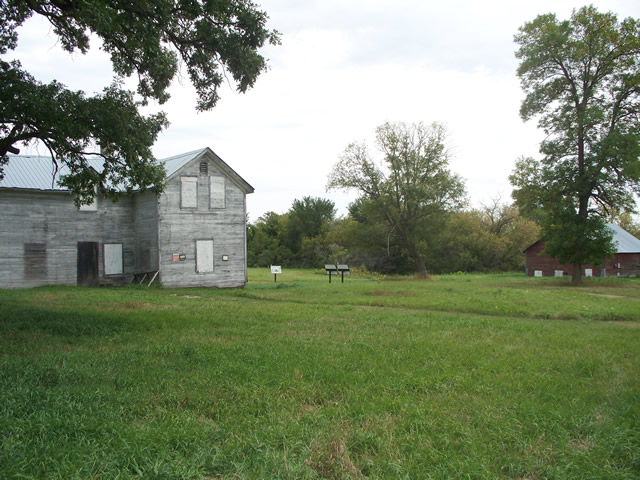
Fort Dufferin, where Mennonites of the West Reserve first stayed

After two years, however, it was determined that the land of East Reserve was limited and unsuitable for farming, so a second larger reserve on the west side of the Red River was established by the Canadian government in 1875. A year later, an Order-in-Council set this land aside for exclusive use by the Russian Mennonites. This land became known as the West Reserve.

Many of the Mennonite settlers of the West Reserve stayed at Fort Dufferin before venturing out to establish villages in the reserve.

In 1878, more than 200 Bergthal Mennonites relocated to the more fertile region of the West Reserve, and later immigrants moved directly to the region from Russia. These settlers established more than 70 villages, many of which still remain today, including Altona, Neubergthal, Reinland, Sommerfeld, and many others. One of the earliest villages was Blumenort, situated west of the present-day local urban district of the same name.

Mennonites lived in street villages called Strassendorfs, and built housebarns, many of which still exist today in the remaining villages. Through the open field system, the land around each village was divided into long, narrow strips for farming, which eventually proved to be an inefficient system for grain farming. Each village was governed by a Schulz, or mayor, and the entire West Reserve was governed by an Oberschulz. This system of governance ended with the establishment of Rural Municipalities.

In 1897, the area was visited by Russian prince and anarchist Peter Kropotkin, who praised the local Mennonites for their industriousness and communal lifestyle.

By 1924, the open field system and many villages of the West Reserve had been abandoned, though 17 still existed in 1960.

A plaque was later erected in Rosenfeld, in the Rural Municipality of Rhineland, commemorating the West Reserve. Next to it, a fieldstone cairn was dedicated on August 2, 1970, in commemoration of the pioneers of the modern Rosenfeld area.

== See also ==
- East Reserve
- Privilegium of 1873
- Block settlement
