= Caliento, Manitoba =

Community in Manitoba, Canada

Coordinates: 49°08′01″N 96°24′54″W

Caliento is a small, unorganized community in southeastern Manitoba in the Rural Municipality of Stuartburn, situated between the communities of Vita, Zhoda, and Sundown.

It is approximately 100 kilometres (62 mi) from Winnipeg and around 45 kilometres (28 mi) from Emerson, Manitoba, at the Canada–US border. A post office was opened there c. 1912 on section 14-2-8E; Safron Stefiuk was the first postmaster. The origin of the name is not certain.

== Early history ==
Caliento was founded in 1907 by a group of 27 families and a few single men that had come from Ukraine in 1896. They came on the steamship "Sicilia" that landed in Winnipeg in July 1896. The original colony was named Stuartburn which was the name of the post office and railway station in the area. Caliento was one of 15 original church communities that developed from the Stuartburn colony in the early 1900s. It is claimed that the name of the town came from the Spanish word "caliente", meaning warm.

The Canadian Northern Railway (CNR) built a railway in 1904 that stretched from Emerson to Ridgeville. Caliento was a station halt along this line along with others that were established every six or seven miles. Toll offices for telephone access were created along the railway in 1918 by the Bell telephone company. These services were only accessible during the day and by 1959 these toll offices were closed. This railway had a significant impact on the geography and economy of the Stuartburn colony. That being said, Stuartburn was a relatively poor area with only 9% of the 276,480 acres being cultivated. 1,285 farmers lived on this land and the average farm had one horse, five cattle, a pig, and only twenty acres cultivated. It seems they were stuck in the pioneer stage while other communities developed faster and generated wealth about four times as rapidly.
