= Manitoba Highway 75 =

Highway in Manitoba

Provincial Trunk Highway 75
- Lord Selkirk Highway; French: Route Lord Selkirk
- PTH 75 highlighted in red

Route information
- Maintained by Manitoba Infrastructure
- Length: 93.6 km (58.2 mi)
- Existed: 1949–present

Major junctions
- South end: I-29 / US 81 at the U.S. border in Emerson
- PTH 14 near Letellier; PTH 23 in Morris
- North end: PTH 100 (TCH) / Route 42 in Winnipeg

Location
- Country: Canada
- Province: Manitoba
- Rural municipalities: Emerson-Franklin, Montcalm, Morris, Ritchot
- Major cities: Winnipeg
- Towns: Morris

Highway system
- Provincial highways in Manitoba; Winnipeg City Routes
← PTH 68	→ PTH 77

Provincial Trunk Highway 75 (PTH 75, also officially known as the Lord Selkirk Highway) is a major highway in the Canadian province of Manitoba. It is the main link between the city of Winnipeg and the United States border, where it connects with Interstate 29 / U.S. Route 81 (I-29/US 81).

== Route description ==
The highway, which is part of Canada's National Highway System, begins at the Pembina–Emerson Border Crossing and runs approximately 101 kilometres (63 mi) north, along on the west side of the Red River, to Winnipeg, where it connects with Pembina Highway (Winnipeg Route 42). The northern end of PTH 75 is its junction with Winnipeg's Perimeter Highway, which is part of the Trans-Canada Highway. PTH 75 is also part of an International Mid-Continent Trade Corridor, a network of highways and rail lines that connects cities in central regions of North America.

The entire route is a four-lane divided highway, but access is not fully controlled. Proposals exist to upgrade the highway to an expressway or freeway standard, with bypasses at the town of Morris and Winnipeg neighbourhood of St. Norbert.

=== Speed limits ===
On February 27, 2008, the Manitoba Highway Traffic Board approved a request by the Government of Manitoba to raise the speed limit on PTH 75 to 110 kilometres per hour (68 mph). The speed limit change took effect on July 1, 2009, with the speed limit raised to 110 km/h (68 mph) from St. Jean Baptiste to the Canada-U.S. border. The remainder of the highway continues to have a speed limit of 100 km/h (62 mph) except in urban areas.

- U.S. border to St. Jean Baptiste: 110 km/h (68 mph)
- Morris: 50–80 km/h (31–50 mph)
- Remainder of highway: 100 km/h (62 mph)

== History ==
The PTH 75 route originated as the Pembina Trail, which was used to travel between the Red River Colony (Selkirk Settlement) and Fort Pembina during the 19th century. The provincial government commemorated this by designating the road as the Lord Selkirk Highway in 1962. By the early 20th century, the trail evolved into the Canadian leg of the Jefferson Highway leading from Winnipeg to New Orleans.

The highway was originally designated as PTH 14 when Manitoba introduced the highway numbering system in 1920. It was re-numbered to PTH 75 in 1949 as, at the time, it connected with US 75 at the Noyes–Emerson East Border Crossing and it was common practice for Manitoba to match highway numbers with connecting U.S. routes. Coinciding with the renumbering, the section between Emerson and Letellier was replaced with a more direct route approximately 3 km (1.9 mi) west of the original one along the Red River. Further changes occurred in the 1950s when a more direct route was constructed in the Rural Municipality of Ritchot and bypasses were added around the communities of Ste. Agathe and St. Jean Baptiste.

PTH 75 formerly extended into the city of Winnipeg. Prior to 1966, PTH 75 followed Pembina Highway (present-day Winnipeg Route 42) and Osborne Street (present-day Winnipeg Route 62) to PTH 1 (Broadway), continuing north as PTH 6. When the Winnipeg Metro Routes were established in c. 1966, PTH 75 was decommissioned inside the Perimeter Highway, with the section of highway between the Perimeter Highway and Winnipeg city limits cosigned as PTH 75 / Route 42.

PTH 75 was gradually converted to a divided four-lane highway between 1985 and 1994 except within the Town of Morris and a 3 km (1.9 mi) section between the Emerson East border station and (former) PTH 29 junction near the West Lynne (now Emerson) border station. The closure of the Noyes and Emerson East border stations (Canada in 2003; the U.S. in 2006) relegated PTH 75's southern terminus a dead-end at the border; thus, PTH 75 was re-routed to its present southern terminus (superseding PTH 29) in 2012. Most of the short decommissioned section of PTH 75 was added to Provincial Road 200. Motorists now wishing to travel US 75 are required to detour through Pembina, North Dakota via I-29, North Dakota Highway 59, and Minnesota State Highway 171.

In 2020, the Canadian and Manitoba governments completed reconstruction of PTH 75's approach to the Emerson border crossing to accommodate future expansion at the port of entry. This included the removal of the old PTH 75/PR 200 (former PTH 29/75) intersection near the border and extending PR 200 to its new southern terminus further away from the border. The Manitoba government also has future plans to reroute PTH 75 around the Winnipeg neighborhood of St. Norbert and connect it to Winnipeg Route 90 (Kenaston Boulevard).

=== Flooding issues ===
PTH 75's proximity to the flood-prone Red River causes closures of the highway during spring flooding. The town of Morris is one of the most problematic areas, as the town is forced to close off the dikes surrounding the town, thereby cutting off PTH 75. These closures have a significant impact on the trucking industry, as PTH 75 is the primary transportation route between Winnipeg and the United States. The Manitoba Trucking Association estimates the closing of the highway costs the industry $1.5 million CAD per week. The closures also have a significant impact on Morris businesses that depend on travelers passing through town. Several solutions have been considered to fix the ongoing problem, including the building of new bridges and raising of roadways along PTH 75. In June 2020, the Manitoba government unveiled a plan to upgrade a portion of PR 246 to utilize it as a bypass when the dike at the north end of Morris is closed.

== Major intersections ==
Division	Location	km	mi	Exit	Destinations	Notes
United States border		0.0	0.0		I-29 south / US 81 south – Grand Forks	Continuation into North Dakota
United States border		0.0	0.0	Pembina–Emerson Border Crossing		
Emerson-Franklin	Emerson	0.5	0.31		PR 200 north – Emerson	Former PTH 75 south to US 75 and northern terminus of PTH 29 (1949–2012); intersection closed in 2019
Emerson-Franklin	Emerson	1.8	1.1		PR 243 west (Post Road / Boundary Commission Trail) – Gretna; PR 200 north – Emerson, Dominion City	Realigned PR 200
Montcalm		8.7	5.4		PR 421 west – Sommerfeld	
Montcalm	Letellier	15.7	9.8		PR 201 – Altona, Dominion City	
Montcalm		22.7	14.1		PTH 14 west – Winkler	
Montcalm	St. Jean Baptiste	29.8	18.5		Caron Street north	St Jean Baptiste access; former PTH 75 alignment; to PR 246 east; no access to PR 246 north of St. Jean Baptiste
Montcalm	St. Jean Baptiste	32.5	20.2		Caron Street south	St Jean Baptiste access; former PTH 75 alignment; to PR 246 east; no access to PR 246 north of St. Jean Baptiste
Town of Morris		40.9	25.4		PTH 23 east (Montreal Avenue) – La Rochelle	South end of PTH 23 concurrency
Town of Morris		41.3	25.7		PTH 23 west (Boyne Avenue) – Roland	North end of PTH 23 concurrency
Morris		44.7	27.8		PR 330 north – Domain, La Salle	
Morris		54.6	33.9		PR 205 – Rosenort, Aubigny, St. Pierre-Jolys	
Ritchot	Ste. Agathe	68.8	42.8		PR 305 – Brunkild, Niverville	
Ritchot	Glenlea	77.4	48.1		Glenlea Road	Former PR 420 north
Ritchot		82.3	51.1		PR 210 east – St. Adolphe	Former PR 429 east
Ritchot	Howden	82.3	51.1		PR 247 west – La Salle	
City of Winnipeg		90.8	56.4		Route 42 begins / Turnbull Drive	Winnipeg city limits; Route 42 southern terminus; south end of Route 42 concurrency
City of Winnipeg		93.6	58.2	94	PTH 100 (TCH) (Perimeter Highway) – Brandon, Kenora	Interchange; PTH 75 northern terminus; north end of Route 42 concurrency; signed as exits 94A (east) and 94B (west); PTH 100 exit 18
City of Winnipeg		100.9	62.7		McGillivray Boulevard (Route 155 west)	Former PTH 3 eastern terminus
City of Winnipeg		104.7	65.1		Donald Street (Route 42 north); Osborne Street (Route 62 south); Corydon Avenue (Route 95 west)	Confusion Corner; former PTH 75 followed Osborne Street
City of Winnipeg		106.2	66.0	Osborne Bridge crosses Assiniboine River		
City of Winnipeg		106.7	66.3		Broadway (PTH 1) Osborne Street (Route 62 north)	Former PTH 75 northern terminus; former PTH 6 southern terminus
1.000 mi = 1.609 km; 1.000 km = 0.621 mi: Closed/former; Concurrency terminus; Route transition

== See also ==
- Red River Trails
