= David Elias =

Canadian writer

- Born: 1949; Winkler, Manitoba
- Education: University of Manitoba
- Occupation: writer
- Spouse: Brenda Sciberras
- Writing career
- Period: 1990s–present

David Elias (born 1949) is a Canadian writer from Winnipeg, Manitoba.

== Career ==
Elias was born in Winkler, Manitoba, in 1949 in a Mennonite home, a topic that often is addressed in his writing. He later moved to Winnipeg where he completed a degree in Philosophy and English from the University of Manitoba, and wrote his first collection of short stories called Crossing the Line in 1992.

Since then he has written six other works of fiction including Places of Grace (1997), Sunday Afternoon (2005), Waiting for Elvis (2009), Henry's Game (2012), Along the Border (2014), Elizabeth of Bohemia: A Novel about Elizabeth Stuart, the Winter Queen (2019) and one work of non-fiction called The Truth About the Barn. His novel Sunday Afternoon was nominated for the Books in Canada First Novel Award as well as the McNally Robinson Book of the Year Award and the Margaret Laurence Award for Fiction. Elizabeth of Bohemia was also nominated for the Margaret Laurence Award for Fiction. He is married to poet Brenda Sciberras.
