= Karen Doell =

Canadian softball player

Personal information
- Born: 29 July 1965 (age 60) Winkler, Manitoba, Canada

Sport
- Sport: Softball

Karen Doell (born 29 July 1965) is a Canadian softball player. She competed in the women's tournament at the 1996 Summer Olympics. Doell was inducted into the Manitoba Sports Hall of Fame in 2008.
