= Friedensruh =

Coordinates: 49°08′01″N 97°52′06″W

Friedensruh is a community in the Canadian province of Manitoba. It is located in the Rural Municipality of Stanley. It is approximately 10 kilometres away from the city of Winkler.
