= Friedensfeld West =

Coordinates: 49°03′25″N 97°56′07″W

Location of Friedensfeld West in Manitoba

Friedensfeld West, locally known as Friedensfeld, is a small hamlet in the Rural Municipality of Stanley, Manitoba, Canada. It is located south of Winkler along Manitoba Highway 32, about 8 kilometers north of the Canada–United States border.

The community is officially known as Friedensfeld West to distinguish it from another community called Friedensfeld located in the Rural Municipality of Hanover in southeastern Manitoba.
