= Larry Dyck =

Canadian ice hockey player

- Born: December 15, 1965 (age 60) Winkler, Manitoba, Canada
- Height: 5 ft 11 in (180 cm)
- Weight: 180 lb (82 kg; 12 st 12 lb)
- Position: Goaltender
- Shot: Left
- Played for: Kalamazoo Wings; Knoxville Cherokees; Milwaukee Admirals; Kansas City Blades; Mobile Mysticks; Central Texas Stampede; Houston Aeros; Michigan K-Wings
- NHL draft: Undrafted
- Playing career: 1988–1998

Larry Dyck (born December 15, 1965) is a Canadian former ice hockey goaltender played the majority of his career in the International Hockey League.

== Awards ==
- WHL West First All-Star Team – 1986
