= Reinfeld, Manitoba =

Village in Manitoba, Canada

Coordinates: 49°10′40″N 97°53′08″W

Reinfeld is an Unincorporated Urban Community (UUC) in the Rural Municipality of Stanley in the Pembina Valley region of Manitoba, Canada, about one km east of Winkler. Mainly a Mennonite community, its relative vicinity to Winkler makes it a possible candidate to become a suburb in the future.

== History ==
In the 1880 Village Census of the West Reserve, Reinfeld was populated by 12 males and 1 female. By the 1890s it was a well developed village. Because of its proximity to Winkler, Manitoba it has seen rapid growth of late.
