= Schanzenfeld =

Community in Manitoba, Canada

Coordinates: 49°07′58″N 97°56′30″W

Schanzenfeld is a small hamlet community in the Rural Municipality of Stanley, Manitoba, Canada, located about 2 miles south of the city of Winkler.

The village was named after Jacob Yost Shantz, a businessman from Ontario who helped Plautdietsch-speaking Mennonites migrate from Imperial Russia to southern Manitoba. He visited areas of southern Manitoba in 1872 to explore possibilities for Mennonite settlement.

The community is first noted on a Department of the Interior map in 1881. It opened a post office on 21-2-4W in 1884 but it was soon moved to Winkler on 4-3-4W. The community was on 16-2-4W and 21-2-4W while the school district was located at SW22-2-4W.

== Economy ==
Schanzenfed has a very diversified economy. The main occupation of its residents is truck drivers and school bus drivers. The local economy consists of two meat shops.

== Education ==
Schanzenfeld has two public schools, Southwood School (Kindergarten to Grade 3) and Prairie Dale School (Grades 4 through 8). Both schools are in the Garden Valley School Division.
