= Neubergthal =

- Unincorporated rural community
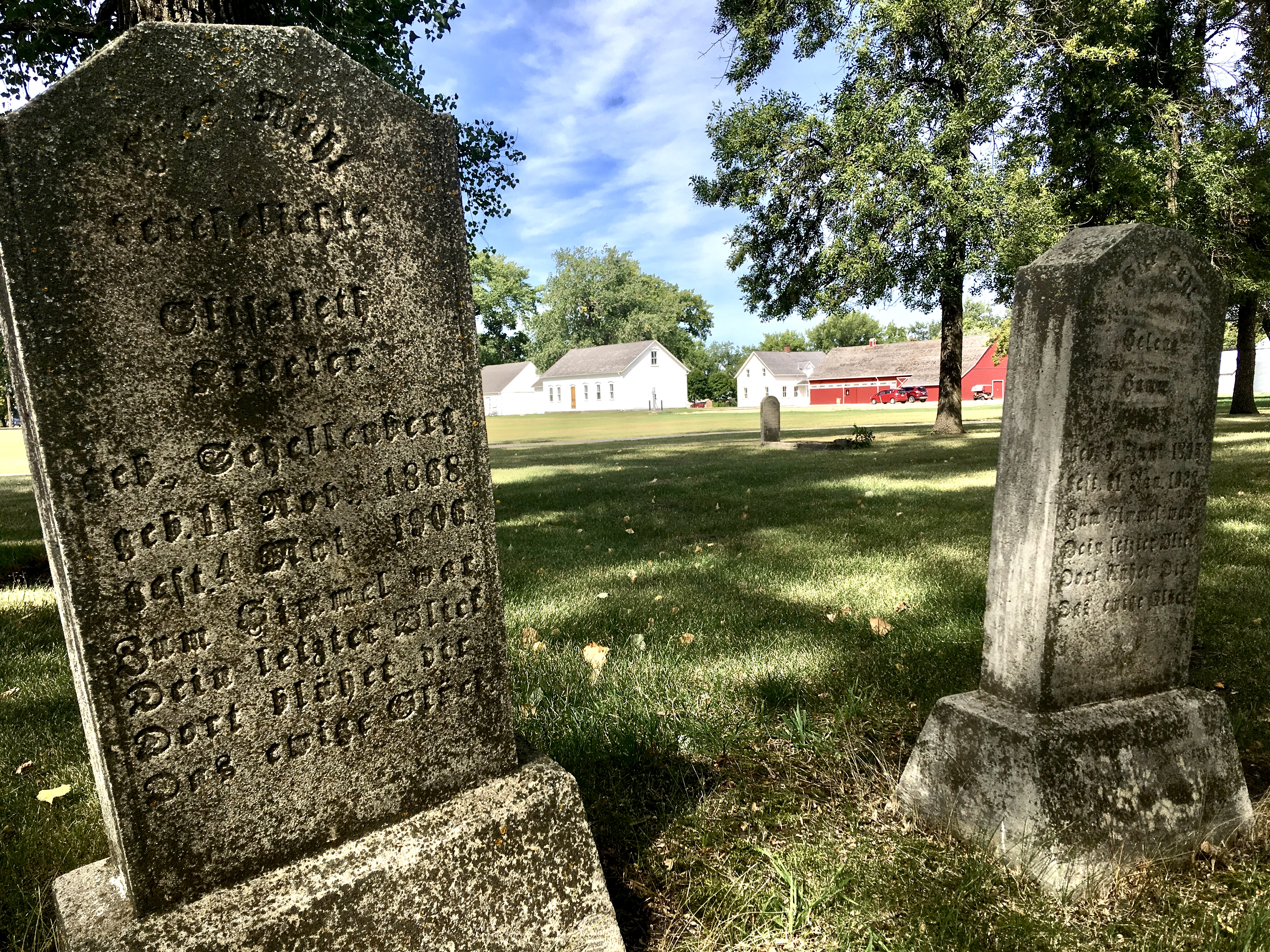
- Cemetery and housebarns in Neubergthal

- Location of Neubergthal in Manitoba
- Coordinates: 49°04′29″N 97°28′52″W
- Country: Canada
- Province: Manitoba
- Region: Pembina Valley
- Census Division: No. 3
- Rural Municipality: Municipality of Rhineland
- Established: 1876

National Historic Site of Canada
- Official name: Neubergthal Street Village
- Designated: 1989

Neubergthal is an unincorporated rural community and a National Historic Site of Canada in the Municipality of Rhineland, Manitoba, Canada. Neubergthal was founded in 1876 as a Mennonite community with Russian Mennonite settlers who came from the Bergthal Colony in Russia. The historic site encompassed six sections of land and the village was laid out in traditional long narrow farmsteads. The village is famous for its traditional Mennonite housebarns and other historic buildings.

== History ==
Neubergthal was founded in 1876 by Plautdietsch-speaking Mennonite settlers from the Bergthal Colony in what is now Ukraine. These Mennonite settlers had Dutch ancestry dating back to the 16th century Friesland and Flanders, after which time they lived in Prussia and eventually the Russian Empire, where they came to be known by the misnomer of Russian Mennonite, even though they are ethnically Dutch not Russian. In the 1870s, some of these Mennonite became dissatisfied with increasing Russification and the loss of their military exemption and were recruited to move to Manitoba. The first settlers moved to the East Reserve in 1874 and from here some moved to the West Reserve in 1876, looking for fertile farmland. Migration to the new village of Neubergthal was based on family relations, which can be seen in the surnames and marriage patterns of the first inhabitants.
Neubergthal, like other Mennonite villages, was settled as Strassendorf, or street village, and villagers lived in a communal farming village where they built traditional Mennonite housebarns, a number of which are still standing today.

== Historic Status ==
In addition to its status as a National Historic Site of Canada, Neubergthal is home to multiple municipal historic sites. These include the Herdsman's House, H.F. Hamm House, and Friesen Interpretive Centre.

The H.F. Hamm House and Friesen Interpretive Centre are maintained by the Neubergthal Heritage Foundation, a nonprofit organization which oversees heritage preservation in the village.

In 2017, the group received a Parks Canada matching grant to restore the historic Klippenstein house barn, targeted for March 2018 completion.

== Media exposure ==
Neubergthal has been featured in the news for some high-profile arrivals to the town, Terry Mierau and Monique Scholte, a couple of opera singers turned farmers. The town, nearby farmers and research work from Winnipeg's University of Manitoba were featured in Katharina Stieffenhofer's documentary called 'From Seed To Seed'. Neubergthal was an inspiration for the fictional village of Altfeld in author Andrew Unger's 2020 novel Once Removed.

== See also ==
- List of National Historic Sites of Canada in Manitoba
- Sommerfelder (Sommerfelder Mennonite group)
