= Vita, Manitoba =

Vita
- Local urban district
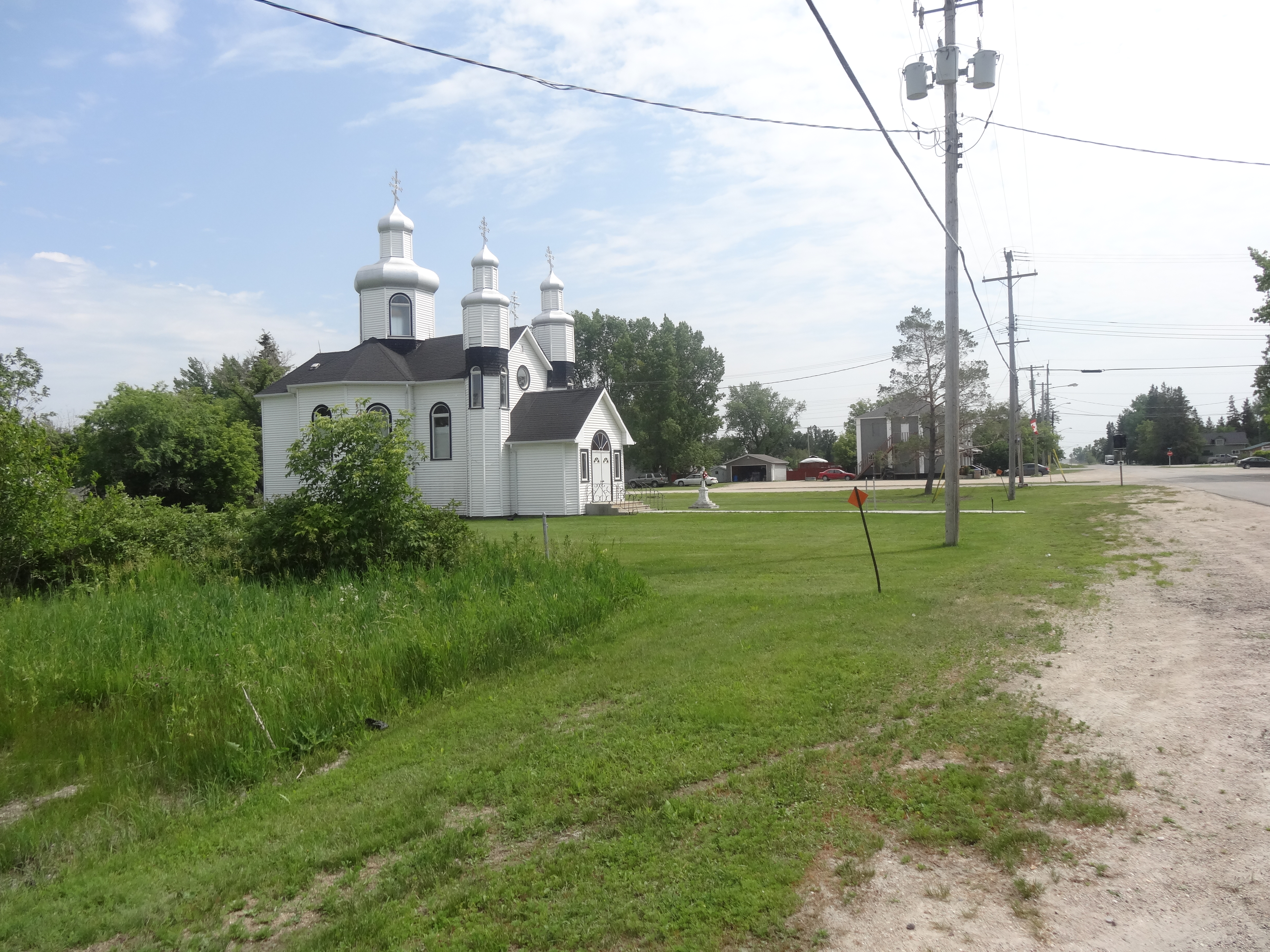
- Holy Trinity Ukrainian Orthodox Church

- Location of Vita in Manitoba Vita (Canada)
- Coordinates: 49°08′02″N 96°33′41″W
- Country: Canada
- Province: Manitoba
- Region: Eastman
- Rural Municipality: Stuartburn
- Post office established: 1908
- Renamed: 1910

Government
  - Reeve: Jim Swidersky
  - MP (Provencher): Ted Falk (CPC)
  - MLA (La Verendrye): Konrad Narth (PC)

Area
  - Total: 3.06 km^{2} (1.18 sq mi)

Population (2021)
  - Total: 512
  - Density: 167.3/km^{2} (433/sq mi)
- Time zone: UTC-6 (CST)
  - Summer (DST): UTC-5 (CDT)
- Highways: PTH 201

Vita (/ˈvaɪtə/; Ukrainian: Вайта, romanized: Vaita) is a local urban district in southeast Manitoba settled by Ukrainian immigrants in the late 1890s. It is roughly 50 km (31 mi) by road from Steinbach (via PTH 12 and Provincial Road 302) in the Rural Municipality of Stuartburn.

Vita has a multicultural population with residents from a variety of ethnic backgrounds, the largest being Ukrainian and Mennonite.

== History ==
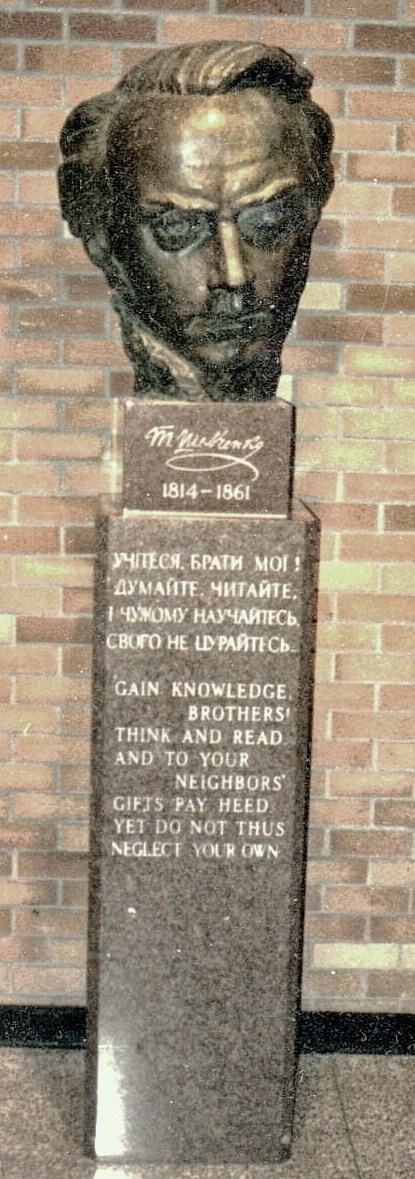
Bust of Taras Shevchenko in the foyer of "Shevchenko School" in Vita

The community's name was originally Szewczenko, the Polish spelling of the surname of the Ukrainian poet Taras Shevchenko. When the railway arrived in the district in 1910, the company decided that "Szewczenko" was both unpronounceable in English and too long to be put on train schedules. As the rail-line laying foreman (who was of Italian background) reserved the right to name stations along the line in Italian (though the pronunciation was Anglicized), and thus changed "Szewczenko" to "Vita."

== Demographics ==
In the 2021 Census of Population conducted by Statistics Canada, Vita had a population of 512 living in 178 of its 208 total private dwellings, a change of 6.9% from its 2016 population of 479. With a land area of 3.06 km^{2} (1.18 sq mi), it had a population density of 167.3/km^{2} (433.4/sq mi) in 2021.

== Amenities ==
Vita is served by Shevchenko School (part of the Border Land School Division), built in 1970. It offers grades Kindergarten through Grade 12. From 1965 until 1991, the Ukrainian language (in the Canadian Ukrainian dialect) was taught as an option at the elementary and secondary levels—parallel to the French language.

Businesses and services in Vita include, but are not limited to: a restaurant, fuel station, hospital, credit union with drive-thru ATM, post office, two grocery stores, an arena-curling rink, a liquor store, and a hotel-motel.

== Culture ==
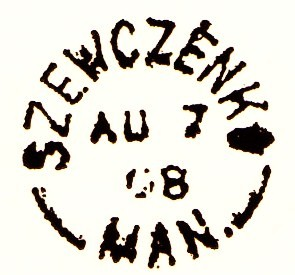
Postmark from the original "Szewczenko" post office dated 1908; the office was renamed "Vita" in 1910.

Two traditional Ukrainian churches serve Vita: Holy Trinity Ukrainian Orthodox Church and St. Demetrius Ukrainian Greek Catholic Church. There is also a Ukrainian National Home (community hall).

Vita is known for its large Canada Day celebration on July 1 of each year. The event generally includes a softball tournament, rodeo, beer gardens, and live entertainment. The night is capped off by a fireworks display.

=== Sports ===
In the 1950s and 1960s, Vita was known for staging major, high-priced baseball tournaments hosted by the community's two teams. The Vita Cubs and Vita Mallards played distant teams like Angusville from the Saskatchewan–Northwest Border district; Chatfield/Grosse Isle in the Interlake; Kenora, Ontario; Greenbush, Lancaster, and Karlstad, Minnesota; Plum Coulee/Winkler to the west, and many other teams (Grunthal, St-Pierre-Jolys, Vassar, Dominion City, Sundown, etc.).

The 1955 Vita Cubs team was elected into the Manitoba Baseball Hall of Fame along with Steve Derewianchuk, catcher. The Vita Mallards played in Senior Baseball Championships and in the Winnipeg Senior Baseball League as the St. Boniface Mallards. The Vic Bozyk Memorial Trophy in the Manitoba Junior Baseball League is named in honour of Victor Bozyk, who was a dominant pitcher for the Cubs and a major contributor to junior baseball in Manitoba.

== Climate ==
1955 tornado

Vita was heavily damaged by a tornado on Sunday, June 19, 1955 – the roof of the hospital was completely torn off. An excerpt from the "1956 Vitonian Yearbook":

At Vita on that afternoon, a friendly ball game was in progress in the new ball park. The sky that a few minutes before had a bright blue, dotted by fluffy clouds grew grey and sullen. The dark clouds seemed suddenly to swoop to earth & blast the town. A tornado swept through the streets overturning buildings, crushing homes & ripping the roof off the hospital. Chimneys, telephone & hydro poles were broken & torn down unto the streets. Two minutes of terror. Miraculously no one was killed; but nine persons were severely injured & had to be taken to hospitals at Morris, Winnipeg & Steinbach. A total of 40 persons were given first aid by Dr. Waldon in the wrecked hospital before it was closed. Vita's High School, recently elevated to the status of Collegiate Institute, resembled a debris of giant toothpicks. All that remained of the two story 8 room school was one broken wall, ready to topple. The full force of the tornado struck Vita at 4:28 p.m. CST.

— Carillon News Archives, Steinbach, Man.

2012 wildfire and winter storm

A second disaster struck in early October 2012 when a wildfire swept into Vita, burning four homes and a bridge on PR 201 west of the community – two vehicles attempted to drive over the collapsed structure with slight injuries to the two drivers. The fire began threatening Vita late in the morning and by noon the community was put under warning and the entire community was evacuated. By early evening, the high winds that had put Vita at risk calmed down and the evacuation order was lifted. Greg Selinger, the Manitoba premier at the time, toured the district by helicopter the following day. The community and area saw relief from the fires in the form of an abnormally early winter storm that saw the region receive snowfall of about 25 cm (9.84 in). The heavy snow felled about 100 power lines causing massive and lengthy power outages which again prompted evacuations for the town, this time voluntarily, to the local community centre.

== Notable people ==
- MaryAnn Mihychuk, politician
- Beatrice Mosionier, writer
