= Walhalla–Winkler Border Crossing =

Canada–United States border crossing

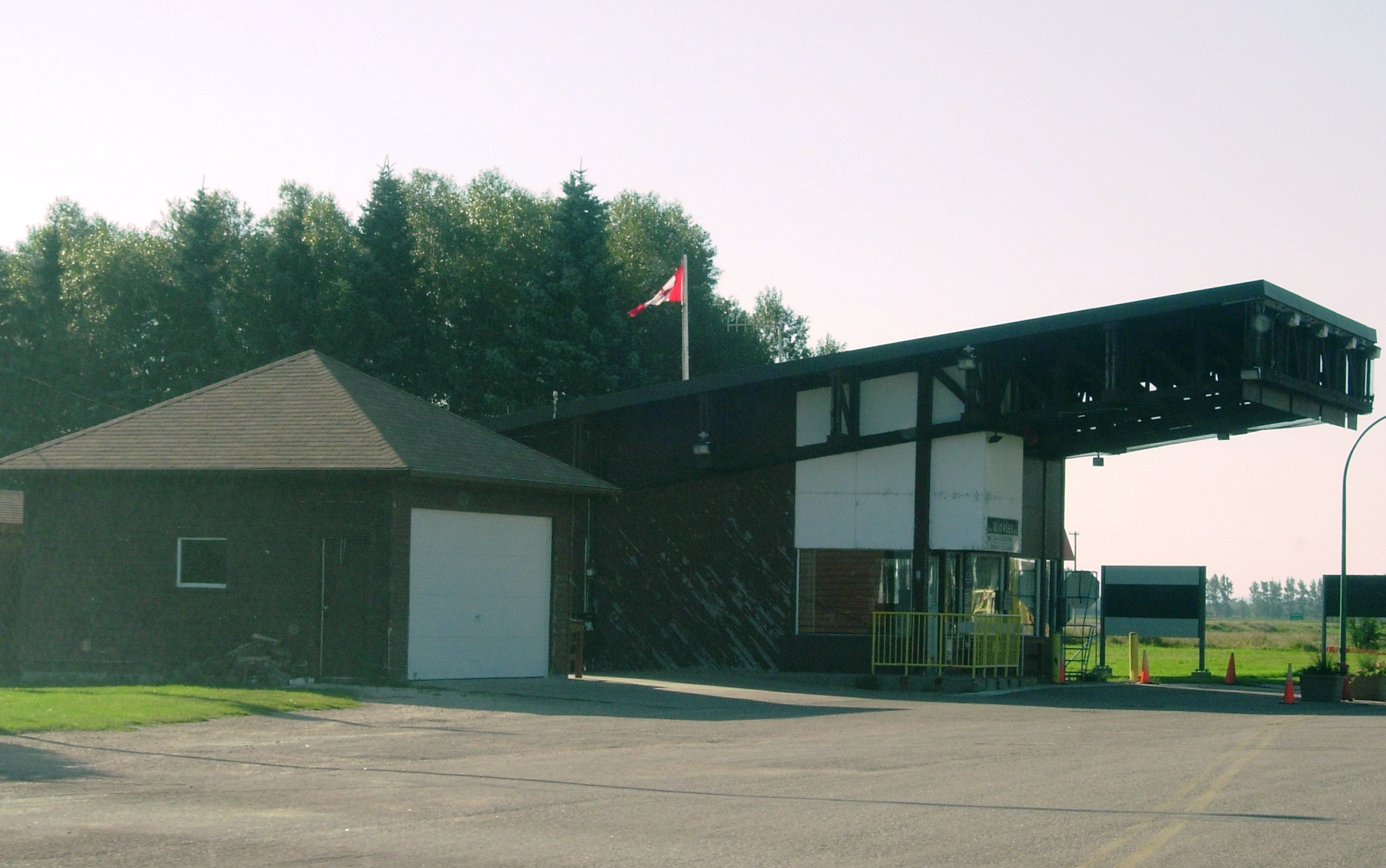
- Canada Border Inspection Station at Winkler, MB

Locaiton
- Country: United States; Canada
- Location: ND 32 / PTH 32; US Port: 10955 North Dakota Highway 32, Walhalla, North Dakota 58282; Canadian Port: Manitoba Highway 32, Winkler, Manitoba R6W 1A0
- Coordinates: 49°00′00″N 97°54′31″W

Details
- Opened: 1907

Website
- US Canadian

The Walhalla–Winkler Border Crossing connects the town of Walhalla, North Dakota and the city of Winkler, Manitoba on the Canada–United States border. North Dakota Highway 32 on the American side joins Manitoba Highway 32 on the Canadian side.

== Railway and highway ==
In September 1907, the Great Northern Railway (GN) rail head from Walhalla reached the border. That December, GN began passenger services from Morden southward across the border. In 1937, the line was abandoned.

The Walhalla–Haskett highway was built in 1945 and paved in 1958.

== Canadian side ==
In terms of the region, the earliest customs service began at Morden in 1885, where the North-West Mounted Police (NWMP) collected duties, issued permits, and patrolled the border to deter smuggling. A customs office was established at Morden in 1897.

A decade later, an additional customs facility was established farther south, primarily to handle cross-border rail traffic. J.A. Klassen was the inaugural customs officer 1907–1912. The office was initially called Krahn, but was renamed a year later to Haskett, where a room in the train station housed the activities. The Port of Gretna provided administrative oversight. The settlement dated from the 1870s, but grew after an American entrepreneur called Haskett bought the respective land from Bernhard Krahn. The closing of the railway began the demise of the town.

In 1945, the customs office relocated to the border, where a new building was erected. In 1967, lobbying by locals changed the customs name to Winkler. In 1969, a new building was officially opened to serve the highway. A rebuild plan issued in 2017 has yet to be finalized.

In 2020, the former border hours of 8am–10pm reduced, becoming 8am–6pm.

== US side ==
The early border patrol history is unclear, but assumedly the US mirrored the establishment of a permanent post in the early 1900s. The US border station, which was built in 1962, was replaced by a new facility in 2012.

== See also ==
- List of Canada–United States border crossings
