= Sundown, Manitoba =

Coordinates: 49°06′13″N 96°16′00″W

Sundown is a small community in southeastern Manitoba. It is located in the Rural Municipality of Stuartburn on PR 201, halfway between the communities of Vita and Piney.

Sundown has two churches, and two community halls. The Ukrainian Catholic Church owns the church and hall on the east side of town while the Ukrainian Orthodox Church owns the church and hall on the west side of town.
