= Hochfeld, Manitoba =

Coordinates: 49°04′41″N 97°56′13″W

Hochfeld is a community in the Canadian province of Manitoba. It is located in the Rural Municipality of Stanley. The community was founded by Mennonites in 1875. The village is the birthplace of Canadian jazz guitarist Ed Bickert.
