= Letellier, Manitoba =

Coordinates: 49°08′13″N 97°18′20″W

Location of Letellier in Manitoba

Letellier is a small Francophone community in the Rural Municipality of Montcalm, Manitoba, Canada. It is located at the junction of Highway 75 and Provincial Road 201, approximately 15 kilometres north of the Pembina–Emerson Border Crossing.

== Notable people from Letellier ==
- Dick Bouchard (1934–1996), National Hockey League player (New York Rangers)
- René Jutras (1913–1995), MP for Provencher
