= Tolstoi, Manitoba =

Hamlet in Manitoba, Canada

Coordinates: 49°04′28″N 96°48′40″W

Tolstoi is a hamlet in the Municipality of Emerson – Franklin, Manitoba, Canada. It is located along Manitoba Highway 59 at the junction with Provincial Road 209, approximately 90 kilometres (56 mi) south of Winnipeg and 10 kilometres (6.2 mi) north of the Tolstoi Port of Entry at the Canada–United States border.

== History ==
Tolstoi was founded by Ukrainian immigrants in the 1890s, one of the earliest Ukrainian settlements in western Canada. Once a thriving community, Tolstoi's population has declined dramatically in recent decades. Its current population is generally older, as most young people have left for jobs in Winnipeg.

The community is served by a grocery store, Ukrainian Catholic and Ukrainian Orthodox churches. The Tolstoi Hotel and Bar opened in 1940, closed in 2008, and was later renovated and reopened in 2022. The community is also the home to the Tolstoi Seniors Centre which is located in the former two-room school house. The hamlet also has a Ukrainian National community hall which is rented out for social events.

Tolstoi is the transfer point for microwave (S-band) television signals between Winnipeg and North Dakota. The closest weather station is at Emerson.

Between 1974 and March 1986, cable companies in Winnipeg received the NBC and CBS affiliates from Fargo, KTHI TV11 and KXJB-TV TV4, respectively (via translator K58BP at Glasston, North Dakota). Two other signals, ABC and PBS affiliates from Grand Forks, WDAZ TV8 and KGFE TV2, are also received from here. By March 1986 Videon Cablesystems and Greater Winnipeg Cablevision received permission from the Canadian Radio-television and Telecommunications Commission (CRTC) to replace KTHI and KXJB-TV with WDIV and WJBK of Detroit, Michigan via the CANCOM package on the Anik satellite. WDAZ and KGFE are still available on Winnipeg cable TV.

One of the biggest challenges for the hamlet is reliable cellular telephone services. The hamlet is located between cellular tower services areas and service is spotty and requires residents to purchase and install antennas and boosters for their residences.
