= Rural Municipality of Stanley =

Rural municipality in Manitoba, Canada

- Rural municipality
- Location of the RM of Stanley in Manitoba
- Coordinates: 49°07′59″N 98°03′56″W
- Country: Canada
- Province: Manitoba
- Region: Pembina Valley
- Established: 1890

Government
  - Reeve: Ike Friesen
  - Governing Body: RM of Stanley Council
  - MP (Portage-Lisgar): Branden Leslie
  - MLA (Borderland): Josh Guenter (PC)

Area
  - Total: 835.18 km^{2} (322.46 sq mi)

Population (2021)
  - Total: 8,981
- Time zone: UTC-6 (CST)
  - Summer (DST): UTC-5 (CDT)
- Website: https://rmofstanley.ca

Stanley is a rural municipality (RM) in the province of Manitoba in Western Canada. It is located in the southern part of the province, along its border with the state of North Dakota in the United States. Since 1876, the area made up part of the Mennonite West Reserve. The municipality has a population of 8,969 as of the 2016 Canada Census. The cities of Winkler and Morden lie geographically within the municipality but are separate urban municipalities.

== Etymology ==
The municipality is named for The Lord Stanley of Preston, 16th Earl of Derby, Governor General of Canada from 1888 to 1893, namesake for the Stanley Cup, which he donated.

== Geography ==
According to Statistics Canada, the RM has an area of 835.59 km^{2} (322.62 sq mi). This does not include the areas belonging to the cities of Winkler and Morden, which are surrounded by the RM, in its north-eastern and northern sections, respectively.

=== Communities ===
- Blumenfeld
- Chortitz
- Friedensfeld
- Friedensruh
- Haskett
- Hochfeld
- Reinfeld
- Reinland
- Schanzenfeld
- Thornhill
- Neuenburg

=== Adjacent rural municipalities and counties ===
- Municipality of Pembina - (west)
- Rural Municipality of Thompson - (northwest)
- Rural Municipality of Roland - (northeast)
- Municipality of Rhineland - (east)
- Pembina County, North Dakota - (southeast)
- Cavalier County, North Dakota - (south)

== Demographics ==
In the 2021 Census of Population conducted by Statistics Canada, Stanley had a population of 8,981 living in 2,279 of its 2,354 total private dwellings, a change of 0.1% from its 2016 population of 8,969. With a land area of 835.18 km^{2} (322.46 sq mi), it had a population density of 10.8/km^{2} (27.9/sq mi) in 2021.

Historical population

Year	Pop.	±% p.a.
1891	5,236	—
1901	7,229	+3.28%
1911	4,739	−4.13%
1921	5,817	+2.07%
1931	5,948	+0.22%
1941	6,204	+0.42%
1951	5,586	−1.04%
1956	5,631	+0.16%
1961	4,967	−2.48%
1966	4,802	−0.67%
1971	4,345	−1.98%

Year	Pop.	±% p.a.
1976	3,971	−1.78%
1981	4,257	+1.40%
1986	4,603	+1.58%
1991	4,558	−0.20%
1996	4,616	+0.25%
2001	5,139	+2.17%
2006	6,367	+4.38%
2011	8,356	+5.59%
2016	8,969	+1.43%
2021	8,981	+0.03%

Panethnic groups in the Rural Municipality of Stanley (2001−2021)
Panethnic group	2021		2016		2011		2006		2001	
Panethnic group	Pop.	%	Pop.	%	Pop.	%	Pop.	%	Pop.	%
European (Note: Statistic includes all persons that did not make up part of a visible minority or an indigenous identity.)	8,690	97.15%	8,830	97.89%	8,270	99.28%	6,320	99.22%	5,130	99.81%
Indigenous	165	1.84%	135	1.5%	20	0.24%	10	0.16%	10	0.19%
Latin American	50	0.56%	10	0.11%	40	0.48%	25	0.39%	0	0%
African	25	0.28%	10	0.11%	0	0%	10	0.16%	0	0%
East Asian (Note: Statistic includes total responses of "Chinese", "Korean", and "Japanese" under visible minority section on census.)	0	0%	20	0.22%	0	0%	10	0.16%	0	0%
Middle Eastern (Note: Statistic includes total responses of "West Asian" and "Arab" under visible minority section on census.)	0	0%	20	0.22%	0	0%	0	0%	0	0%
South Asian	0	0%	0	0%	0	0%	0	0%	0	0%
Southeast Asian (Note: Statistic includes total responses of "Filipino" and "Southeast Asian" under visible minority section on census.)	0	0%	0	0%	0	0%	0	0%	0	0%
Other/multiracial (Note: Statistic includes total responses of "Visible minority, n.i.e." and "Multiple visible minorities" under visible minority section on census.)	0	0%	0	0%	0	0%	0	0%	0	0%
Total responses	8,945	99.6%	9,020	100.57%	8,330	99.69%	6,370	100.05%	5,140	100.35%
Total population	8,981	100%	8,969	100%	8,356	100%	6,367	100%	5,122	100%
Note: Totals greater than 100% due to multiple origin responses

== See also ==
- Walhalla–Winkler Border Crossing
