= Reinland =

Coordinates: 49°02′30″N 97°52′17″W

Reinland is a Mennonite village in Manitoba, Canada, located in the Rural Municipality of Stanley, about ten minutes south of Winkler and about five minutes north of the U.S. border. Its population numbers about five hundred, with an agrarian economy.

Reinland was one of the first Mennonite villages established in the West Reserve; it now has some of the best examples of original Mennonite village setup and buildings, including traditional housebarns and a historic church. The village also has one of the oldest wooden churches in Western Canada that is still in use. Built by the Old Colony Mennonite settlers in 1878, the church was utilized as a sanctuary until the early 1970s, at which time it was turned into a community centre. Across the street is another important attraction: the Ens Heritage Homestead.

The Reinlander Mennonite conference originated in this village, as the home of the bishop.

== Notable residents ==
- Di Brandt, poet
