= Roland, Manitoba =

Roland
- Village
- Location in the province of Manitoba
- Coordinates: 49°21′59″N 97°56′24″W
- Country: Canada
- Province: Manitoba
- Region: Pembina Valley
- RM: Roland
- Time zone: UTC-6 (CST)
  - Summer (DST): UTC-5 (CDT)
- Postal code: R0G 1T0
- Area code: 204
- Website: RM of Roland

Roland is a village of about 300 people in the Pembina Valley Region of Manitoba, Canada, located in the Rural Municipality of Roland, about 16 km north of Winkler. It is named for Roland McDonald, a farmer and lumber merchant, who settled there in 1880 when the post office was opened. Juno nominated international children's musicians, LuLu and the TomCat, make their home in Roland. Roland is the birthplace of the Canadian 4-H Council and the Canadian 4-H Club. Roland is home to the world's largest pumpkin, a fibreglass structure built as a tribute to Edgar VanWyck, a local resident who made the Guinness Book of World Records in 1977 for growing the largest pumpkin.

== Culture ==
One of Roland's main cultural events is the annual Roland Pumpkin Fair, which includes a "pumpkin weigh-off". The fair also includes live entertainment, beer gardens and a harvest supper.

Roland - as the birthplace of 4-H in Canada - is home to the 4-H Museum where the history of the club in Canada, particularly Roland, is showcased.

Roland is also home to the Roland Elementary School.

The area is home to the Roland Golf Course, which is located a few miles out of the village.

== Notable residents ==
- LuLu and the TomCat - a children's musical group formed in Roland, Manitoba, Canada in 2001 by Lori LuLu and Thomas Neufeld. The group has produced children's albums and made concert appearances.
- Edgar Van Wyck - made the Guinness Book of World Records in 1977 for growing the largest pumpkin.
- Garfield McMahon, Olympic sports shooter.

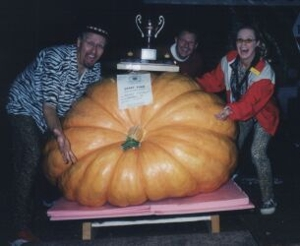
LuLu and the TomCat are popular family entertainers at the annual Roland Pumpkin Fair, held every first Saturday in October.
