= Rural Municipality of Roland =

Rural municipality in Manitoba, Canada

- Rural municipality
- Location of the RM of Roland in Manitoba
- Coordinates: 49°21′17″N 97°53′59″W
- Country: Canada
- Province: Manitoba
- Region: Pembina Valley

Area
  - Land: 485.21 km^{2} (187.34 sq mi)

Population (2021)
  - Total: 1,145
- Time zone: UTC-6 (CST)
  - Summer (DST): UTC-5 (CDT)
- Area codes: 204 and 431
- Website: rmofroland.ca

Roland is a rural municipality (RM) located in the Pembina Valley Region of Manitoba, Canada. According to the Canada 2016 Census, it has a population of 1,129.

== Communities ==
- Graham
- Jordan
- Kronsgart
- Myrtle
- Roland

== Demographics ==
In the 2021 Census of Population conducted by Statistics Canada, Roland had a population of 1,145 living in 393 of its 424 total private dwellings, a change of 1.4% from its 2016 population of 1,129. With a land area of 484.47 km^{2} (187.05 sq mi), it had a population density of 2.4/km^{2} (6.1/sq mi) in 2021.

== Notable people ==
- Mary Dunn (née Armitage; 1903–1965), Canadian sports executive
