= Rural Municipality of Montcalm =

Rural municipality in Manitoba, Canada

Montcalm
- Rural municipality
- Rural Municipality of Montcalm
- Location of the RM of Montcalm in Manitoba
- Coordinates: 49°10′39″N 97°19′29″W
- Country: Canada
- Province: Manitoba
- Region: Pembina Valley
- Named for: Louis-Joseph de Montcalm

Area
  - Land: 468.25 km^{2} (180.79 sq mi)

Population (2021)
  - Total: 1,278
- Time zone: UTC-6 (CST)
  - Summer (DST): UTC-5 (CDT)
- Area codes: 204 and 431
- Website: rmofmontcalm.com

The Rural Municipality of Montcalm (French: Municipalité rurale de Montcalm) is a rural municipality (RM) in the Pembina Valley Region of Manitoba in Western Canada.

As of 2021, Montcalm has a population of 1,278 people. Three Francophone towns are located in Montcalm: St. Joseph, Letellier, and St. Jean Baptiste.

== History ==
The Rural Municipality of Montcalm was incorporated on May 25, 1881. It was named for Louis-Joseph de Montcalm (1712-1759), commander of French forces on the Plains of Abraham at Quebec. In 1891, the subdistrict of Montcalm had a population of 1688.

== Geography ==
The Rural Municipality of Montcalm is located in the Pembina Valley Region of Manitoba, with an area of 469.41 km^{2} (181.24 mi^{2}).

The Canada–United States border opposite Pembina County, North Dakota, forms a small part of Montcalm's southern boundary; there is no direct road link between the RM and county. The Roseau River Anishinabe First Nation is situated between Montcalm and the neighbouring Municipality of Emerson – Franklin.

Montcalm also borders the municipalities of Rhineland, De Salaberry, and Morris, as well as the eastern edge of the Town of Morris. The Red River of the North flows northward though the eastern part of Montcalm.

Most of the St. Joseph Wind Farm lies within the RM.

=== Communities ===
- Christie
- Letellier
- Martins Spur
- St. Jean Baptiste
- St. Joseph
- Ste. Elizabeth

== Demographics ==
In the 2021 Census of Population conducted by Statistics Canada, Montcalm had a population of 1,278 living in 490 of its 524 total private dwellings, a change of 1.4% from its 2016 population of 1,260. With a land area of 468.25 km^{2} (180.79 sq mi), it had a population density of 2.7/km^{2} (7.1/sq mi) in 2021.

== Industry and culture ==
Agriculture is one of the leading industries in the Montcalm area, with grain production (such as wheat, barley, flax, oats, corn, canola and sunflowers), hog and cattle farms, and seeds all being main types of farming. St. Jean Baptiste is home to major grain processing and hauling companies NuVision Commodities and Roy Legumex.

Manitoba’s largest wind farm is located in St. Joseph.

St. Jean Baptiste is home to the oldest rural convent in Manitoba: the former convent of the Sisters of the Holy Names of Jesus and Mary, which was founded between 1897 and 1898.

== See also ==
- List of francophone communities in Manitoba
- Manitoba Highway 75
