= Boundary Commission Trail =

Trail in western Canada

The Boundary Commission Trail (French: Sentier de la Commission de délimitation) was a trail in western Canada used by the North American Boundary Commission to survey the Canada–United States border starting in 1872. The North-West Mounted Police (NWMP) also used the trail in their March West in 1874. The trail no longer exists, but is commemorated with a modern highway route that approximately follows the trail used by the NWMP and is called the Red Coat Trail.

American and Canadian surveyors worked together in the difficult task of surveying the border, which was agreed upon in the Treaty of 1818 to be the 49th parallel. They met in September 1872 in Pembina, Dakota Territory, where they spent the winter before heading out in the spring of 1873 to begin surveying and placing markers along the route starting at the Lake of the Woods. The winter of 1873–74 was spent in Willow Bunch, North-West Territories. In the spring they continued their work and the last marker was placed on 8 August 1874 at Waterton Lake. Waterton Lake straddles the 49th parallel in present-day Alberta and Montana.

In Manitoba, the trail is commemorated with signage on Highways 3, 32, 83, and 243.

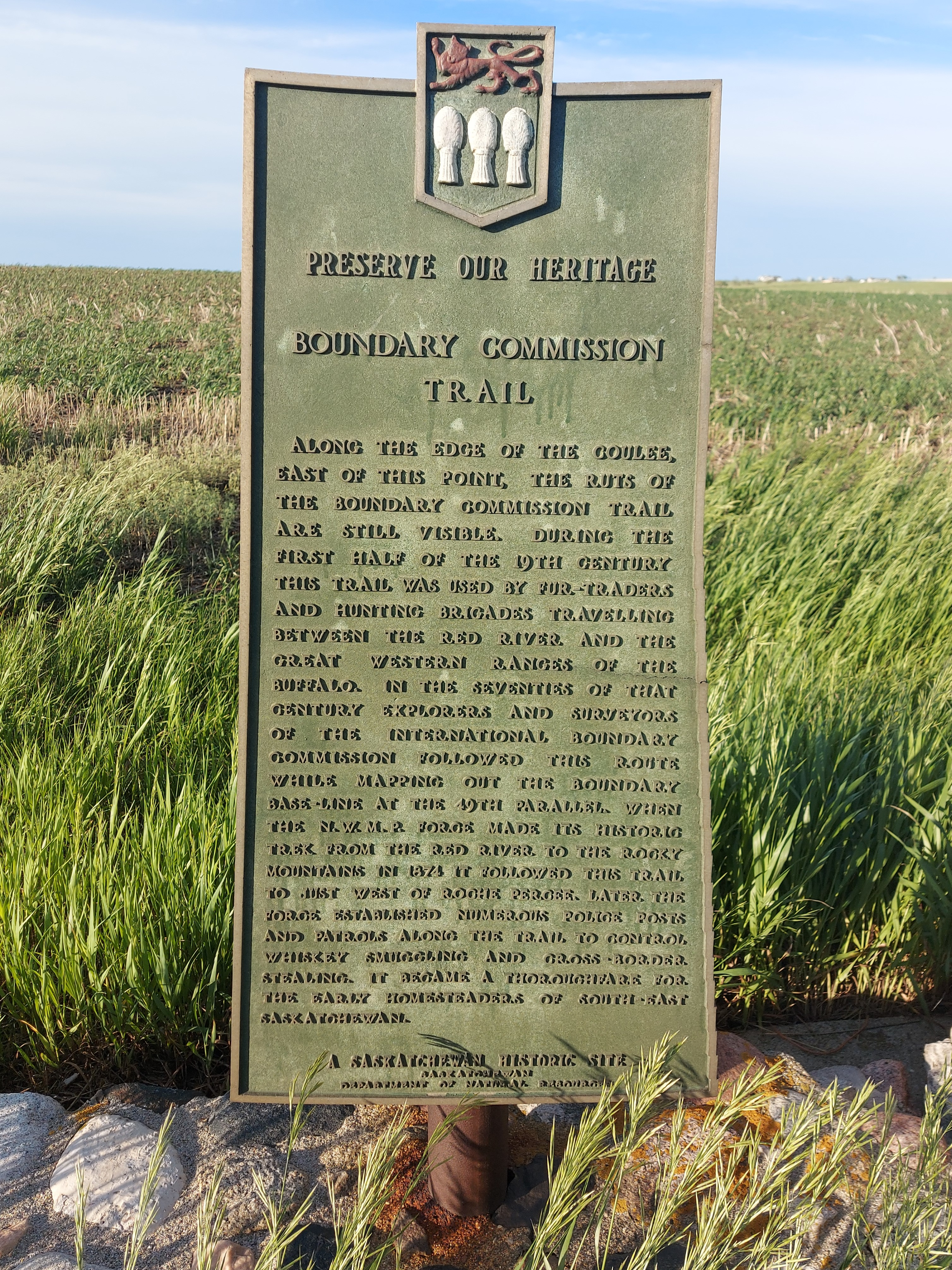
Boundary Commission Trail plaque near Roche Percee, Saskatchewan

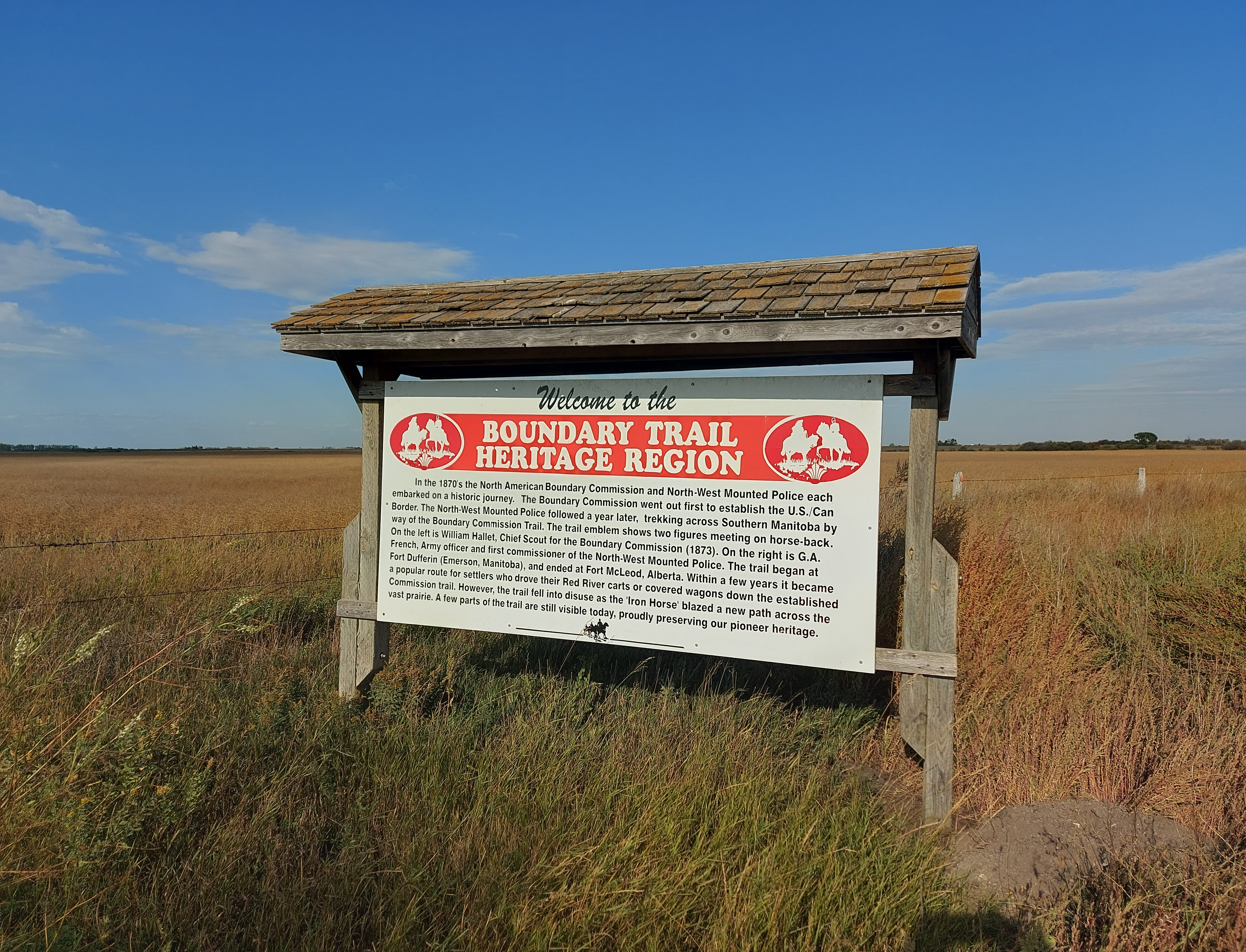
Boundary Trail Heritage Region sign on Highway 83 in the Municipality of Two Borders

== See also ==
- Fort Dufferin
- Red Coat Trail
- International Boundary Commission
