= Rosenfeld, Manitoba =

Rosenfeld
- Local urban district
- Location of Rosenfeld in Manitoba
- Coordinates: 49.200°N 97.550°W
- Country: Canada
- Province: Manitoba
- Rural municipality: Rhineland

Area
  - Land: 2.72 km^{2} (1.05 sq mi)

Population (2021)
  - Total: 318
- Time zone: UTC-6 (CST)
  - Summer (DST): UTC-5 (CDT)

Rosenfeld is a local urban district within the Rural Municipality of Rhineland in the Canadian province of Manitoba. It is recognized as a designated place by Statistics Canada.

== History ==
Rosenfeld was founded as a train station in 1882. It achieved unincorporated village status in 1949 and then local urban district status in 1996.

== Demographics ==
As a designated place in the 2021 Census of Population conducted by Statistics Canada, Rosenfeld had a population of 318 living in 97 of its 108 total private dwellings, a change of −5.9% from its 2016 population of 338. With a land area of 2.72 km^{2} (1.05 sq mi), it had a population density of 116.9/km^{2} (302.8/sq mi) in 2021.

== See also ==
- List of communities in Manitoba
- List of designated places in Manitoba
- List of local urban districts in Manitoba
