= Plum Coulee =

Town in Manitoba

Coordinates: 49°11′28″N 97°45′38″W

Location of Plum Coulee in Manitoba

Plum Coulee is an unincorporated urban community in the Municipality of Rhineland within the Canadian province of Manitoba that held town status prior to January 1, 2015. It is west of Altona, one hour southwest of Winnipeg and 22 kilometres from the United States border. It is also the former home to the Plum Coulee Xpress hockey club. It has an artificial beach located in town called Sunset Beach.

== Demographics ==
In the 2021 Census of Population conducted by Statistics Canada, Plum Coulee had a population of 1,040 living in 299 of its 338 total private dwellings, a change of 15% from its 2016 population of 904. With a land area of 2.44 km^{2} (0.94 sq mi), it had a population density of 426.2/km^{2} (1,103.9/sq mi) in 2021.

== Notable persons ==
- Philanthropist Saidye Bronfman was born in Plum Coulee.
- Food writer Cecily Brownstone was born in Plum Coulee.
- Violinist Rosemary Siemens is from the Plum Coulee area.

== Climate ==
Plum Coulee has the hottest daytime temperatures in Manitoba. Summers are hot and winters are similar to other cities in the Canadian Prairies. There are 21 inches of precipitation annually.

Climate data for Plum Coulee, MB (1971-2000 Normals)
Month	Jan	Feb	Mar	Apr	May	Jun	Jul	Aug	Sep	Oct	Nov	Dec	Year
Record high °C (°F)	8.3 (46.9)	14 (57)	18 (64)	36 (97)	38 (100)	38.5 (101.3)	39.4 (102.9)	40 (104)	38.5 (101.3)	34 (93)	25.5 (77.9)	15 (59)	40 (104)
Mean daily maximum °C (°F)	−11.5 (11.3)	−7.1 (19.2)	−0.3 (31.5)	10.8 (51.4)	20.1 (68.2)	24.2 (75.6)	26.6 (79.9)	26.2 (79.2)	19.9 (67.8)	11.8 (53.2)	−0.2 (31.6)	−8.4 (16.9)	9.3 (48.7)
Daily mean °C (°F)	−16.3 (2.7)	−12 (10)	−4.9 (23.2)	4.8 (40.6)	13 (55)	17.8 (64.0)	20 (68)	19.2 (66.6)	13.4 (56.1)	6.2 (43.2)	−4.4 (24.1)	−12.9 (8.8)	3.7 (38.7)
Mean daily minimum °C (°F)	−21.1 (−6.0)	−16.9 (1.6)	−9.4 (15.1)	−1.3 (29.7)	5.9 (42.6)	11.3 (52.3)	13.4 (56.1)	12.1 (53.8)	6.9 (44.4)	0.6 (33.1)	−8.6 (16.5)	−17.4 (0.7)	−2 (28)
Record low °C (°F)	−37.8 (−36.0)	−40.5 (−40.9)	−32.8 (−27.0)	−23.3 (−9.9)	−10 (14)	−1.1 (30.0)	2.5 (36.5)	−1 (30)	−6.5 (20.3)	−20 (−4)	−36.5 (−33.7)	−37.5 (−35.5)	−40.5 (−40.9)
Average precipitation mm (inches)	20.8 (0.82)	19 (0.7)	25.8 (1.02)	32.2 (1.27)	62.3 (2.45)	87.4 (3.44)	75.8 (2.98)	69.5 (2.74)	53 (2.1)	40 (1.6)	25.8 (1.02)	22 (0.9)	533.6 (21.01)
Source: Environment Canada
