= Municipality of Rhineland =

Rural municipality in Manitoba, Canada

Rhineland
- Rural municipality
- Municipality of Rhineland
- Location of the RM of Rhineland in Manitoba
- Coordinates: 49°07′59″N 97°35′39″W
- Country: Canada
- Province: Manitoba
- Region: Pembina Valley
- Incorporated (amalgamated): January 1, 2015

Population (2016)
  - Total: 5,945
- Time zone: UTC-6 (CST)
  - Summer (DST): UTC-5 (CDT)
- Website: rmofrhineland.com

The Municipality of Rhineland is a rural municipality (RM) in the Pembina Valley Region of Manitoba. The RM had a population of 5,945 as of the 2016 Canada Census. The average age in the municipality is 31.

It surrounds, but does not include, the Town of Altona.

== History ==
The municipality was incorporated on January 1, 2015, via the amalgamation of the Rural Municipality of Rhineland and the towns of Gretna and Plum Coulee. It was formed as a requirement of The Municipal Amalgamations Act, which required municipalities with a population less than 1,000 to amalgamate with one or more neighbouring municipalities by 2015. The Government of Manitoba initiated the amalgamations for municipalities to meet the 1997 minimum population requirement of 1,000 to incorporate a municipality.

The original RM of Rhineland was incorporated as a rural municipality on February 14, 1880, along with the neighbouring RM of Douglas, which was absorbed into Rhineland in February 1891.

In 1882, the community of Rosenfeld was founded in the RM as a CPR station. Though becoming an unincorporated village in 1949, it was later turned into a Local Urban District in Rhineland in 1996 with the rewriting of the Manitoba Municipal Act, and exists as an LUD to this day.

Rhineland takes its name after a district in the Rhine valley in western Germany.

== Communities ==
- Blumenort South
- Gnadenfeld
- Gnadenthal
- Gretna
- Halbstadt
- Horndean
- Kronsthal
- Neubergthal
- Neuhorst
- Plum Coulee
- Rosenfeld
- Rosengart
- Rosetown
- Schoenwiese
- Sommerfeld

== Demographics ==
In the 2021 Census of Population conducted by Statistics Canada, Rhineland had a population of 5,819 living in 1,641 of its 1,748 total private dwellings, a change of −2.1% from its 2016 population of 5,945. With a land area of 958.48 km^{2} (370.07 sq mi), it had a population density of 6.1/km^{2} (15.7/sq mi) in 2021.

== See also ==
- Altona, Manitoba
- Neche–Gretna Border Crossing
