= Winkler, Manitoba =

Winkler
- City
- City of Winkler
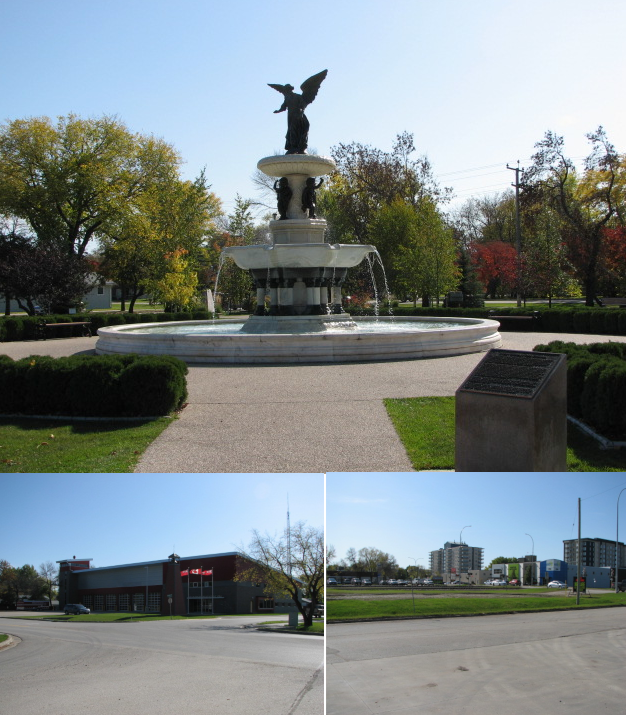
- From top, left to right: Bethel Heritage Park, Winkler Fire Station, Downtown Winkler

- Seal
- Motto: Dream. Build. Live.
- City boundaries

- Location of Winkler Winkler (Manitoba)
- Coordinates: 49°10′54″N 97°56′23″W
- Country: Canada
- Province: Manitoba
- Region: Pembina Valley
- Incorporated: Village: May 9, 1906
- Town: April 7, 1954
- City: April 7, 2002

Government
  - Mayor: Henry Siemens
  - Governing Body: Winkler City Council
  - City Manager: Jody Penner
  - MP: Branden Leslie
  - MLA: Carrie Hiebert (Morden-Winkler)

Area
  - City: 20.73 km^{2} (8.00 sq mi)
  - Metro: 872.19 km^{2} (336.75 sq mi)
- Elevation: 259 m (850 ft)

Population (2021 Census)
  - City: 13,745 (4th)
  - Density: 663.1/km^{2} (1,717/sq mi)
  - Urban: 13,745
  - Metro: 32,655
  - Metro density: 34.8/km^{2} (90/sq mi)
- Time zone: UTC−06:00 (CST)
  - Summer (DST): UTC−05:00 (CDT)
- Forward sortation area: R6W
- Area codes: 204, 431
- Demonym: Winklerite
- Website: City of Winkler

Winkler is a city in Manitoba, Canada, with a population of 13,745 (census agglomeration 32,655), making it the 4th largest city in Manitoba, as of the 2021 Canadian census. It is located in southern Manitoba, surrounded by the Rural Municipality of Stanley, about one hundred kilometres southwest of Winnipeg and 13 km (8.1 mi) east of its "twin city" Morden. As the largest city in the Pembina Valley, it serves as a regional hub for commerce, agriculture and industry. Winkler is the third-fastest growing city in the province after Morden and Steinbach.

== History ==
=== Pre-European settlement ===
The land in southeast Manitoba upon which Winkler sits, was the traditional lands of the nomadic Ojibwe-speaking Anishinaabe people. They used their lands for hunting, fishing, and trapping. The Anishinaabe knew no borders at the time and their land ranged both north and south of the Canada–United States border, and both east and west of the Red River. The explorer Alexander Henry explored and described what would become Winkler in August 13, 1806. On 3 August 1871 the Anishinaabe signed Treaty 1 and moved onto reserves.

=== Early history ===
European settlement in the Winkler area history dates back to 1875 when Plautdietsch-speaking Mennonites began settling in the area known as the West Reserve, which had been set aside exclusively for the Russian Mennonites. The West Reserve as established two years after an earlier Mennonite Reserve called the East Reserve was founded east of the Red River. Many of Winkler-area's first settlers moved from the East Reserve. The first official Mennonite Brethren congregation was founded in Burwalde, near Winkler in 1888.

In 1892, Valentine Winkler, a lumber entrepreneur and politician who owned and operated his own lumber business in nearby Morden founded the village of Winkler. Because Winkler's many customers from the Mennonite settlement wanted him to build a market in their vicinity, he persuaded the Canadian Pacific Railway to build a spur route on the northeastern edge of the settlement where Winkler had been established.

=== Incorporation as a village ===
Winkler was incorporated as a village on May 9, 1906. By that time, the flourishing village had become home to a number of German, Jewish and English merchants. The Mennonites began moving into the village soon after and by World War I, they outnumbered all other groups.

Winkler experienced significant floods in 1916, 1917, 1933 and 1966. On Tuesday, March 22, 1966, several merchants in Winkler closed down their shops for the day when they found the street flooded and water up to their doorsteps. Most of the business section was covered with two feet of water. Shopkeepers sandbagged their store front entrances while homeowners had flooded basements. A spokesman for the Emergency Measures Organization, said that about two-thirds of the town was under water. A tornado and accompanying cloudburst passed a mile west of Winkler on May 23, 1933, resulting in the worst flooding that locals could recall. The twister struck late in the afternoon, and on May 24, the whole town was flooded.

=== Incorporation as a town ===
During the early 1900s, a large number of Jewish and German merchants emigrated from Winkler, causing a decline in population. However, the village's population increased after World War II, and on April 7, 1954, Winkler was incorporated as a town.

In 1985, the Habitat for Humanity movement spread to Canada with the first Canadian build in Winkler.

=== Winkler becomes a city ===
Following a halt in growth during the 1960s, the town's rapid growth in population resumed and continued into the 1990s. On April 7, 2002, Winkler was officially granted city status. The city celebrated its centennial anniversary in the summer of 2006.

== Geography and climate ==
Winkler

Climate chart (precipitation, max. and min. temperature)
J	F	M	A	M	J	J	A	S	O	N	D
21 −11 −17	13 −11 −19	34 −3 −10	45 14 −2	92 20 4	110 24 12	71 25 14	70 25 14	37 20 8	44 15 −1	18 4 −7	15 −11 −16
- █ Average max. and min. temperatures in °C
- █ Precipitation totals in mm
Imperial conversion
J	F	M	A	M	J	J	A	S	O	N	D
0.8 12 1	0.5 12 −2	1.3 27 14	1.8 57 28	3.6 68 39	4.3 75 54	2.8 77 57	2.8 77 57	1.5 68 46	1.7 59 30	0.7 39 19	0.6 12 3
- █ Average max. and min. temperatures in °F
- █ Precipitation totals in inches

Located on the western edge of the Red River Valley, Winkler is located at the corner of provincial highways 14 and 32. It is 70 km (43 mi) northwest of a 24-hour Canada–United States border crossing at Emerson, and about 20 km (12 mi) north of the Walhalla–Winkler Border Crossing with the United States at Walhalla, North Dakota.

Winkler is situated on the prehistoric beaches of Lake Agassiz. The lake's shores were formed over 10,000 years ago by the Pembina Escarpment, located a few kilometres west of Winkler. A secondary beach known as the Emerado Beach lies to the west of Winkler. This gentle rise in elevation was formed thousands of years ago when the draining of Lake Agassiz temporarily stalled.

The rich soils of the area are separated by the Emerado Beach. Coarser textured loamy sand soils, located to the west, are suitable for irrigation and produce potato, corn and bean crops. To the east, finer textured clay soils produce sugar beets, beans, canola, corn and small grains.

Winkler's climate is typically continental, resulting in dry cold winters and hot, frequently dry summers. Summer temperatures typically range from 20 to 30 °C (68 to 86 °F), while winter temperatures average between −15 and −25 °C (5 and −13 °F). The Winkler area obtains the most heat units for crop production in Manitoba. Winkler receives an annual average of 416 mm (16.4 in) of precipitation (most of which falls during the spring and summer months) and 119.7 cm (47.1 in) of snow. Winkler's average frost-free period is 125 days.

== Economy ==
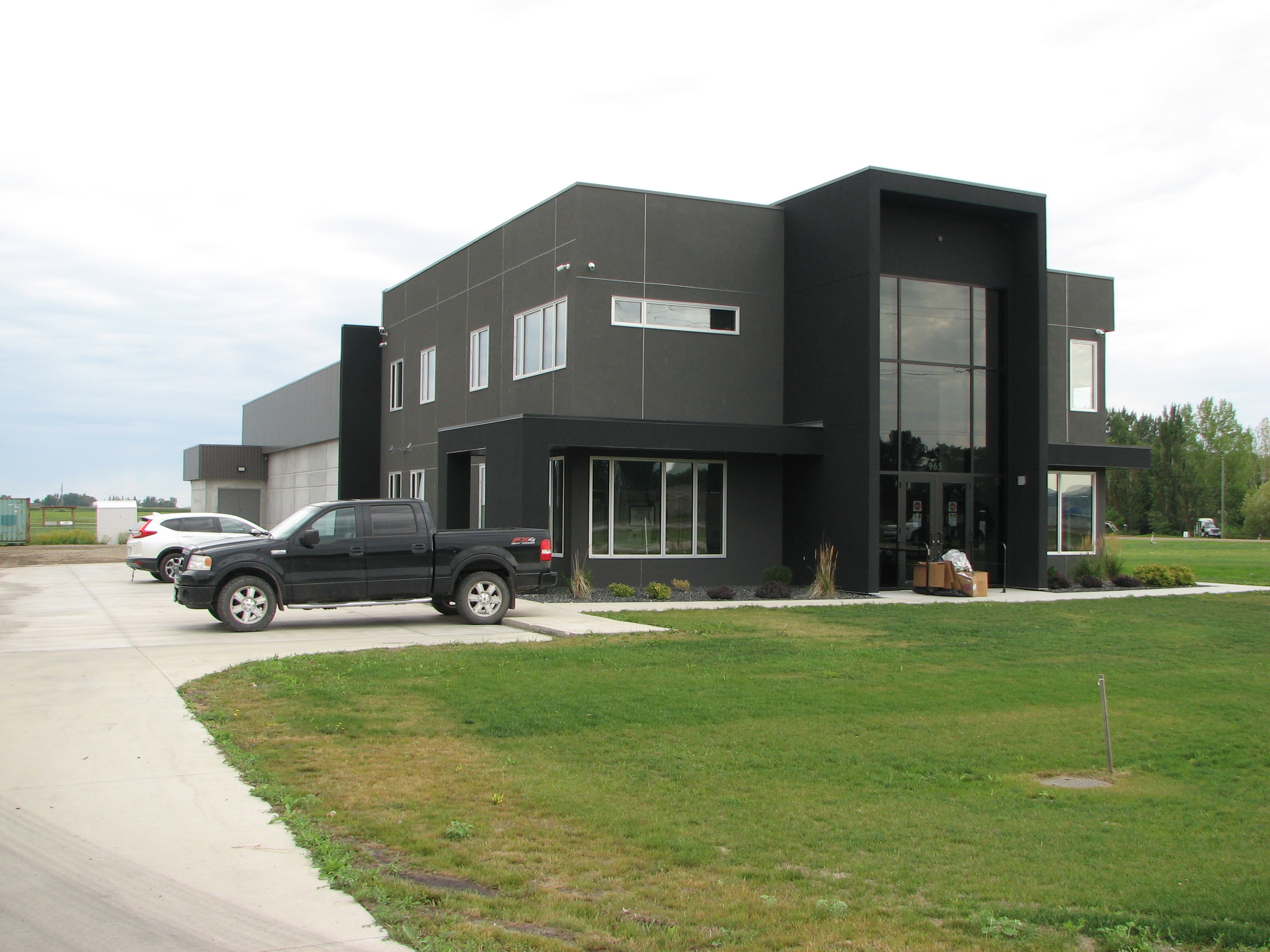
Valley Fiber head office and data centre

Winkler is the economic hub of southern Manitoba. The retail trading area serves an estimated 17,000 households. 4,380 people are employed in Winkler. Approximately 30% of the work force is employed in the industrial sector. The city's second-largest employer, employing 20% of the work force, is the health and education sector.

A number of industries have grown and developed in Winkler throughout the years. One of Winkler's largest employers is Triple E Recreational Vehicles, a recreational vehicle manufacturer. Other products manufactured in Winkler include mobile homes, houseboats, farm equipment, windows and doors. Two foundries, a straw fibre plant and a tire recycling plant are also located in Winkler.

Winkler's agricultural sector is one of the most productive and diversified in Manitoba. The area surrounding Winkler is home to rich, fertile soils which are especially suited to growing potatoes. However, many other crops are grown in the area, including wheat, canola, corn and beans. The area's livestock operations also continue to grow; hogs and cattle are raised, while dairy farms contribute to the making of cheese.

Business development in Winkler has boomed in the years since incorporation. On average, the city becomes home to 10-20 new businesses per year. In 2002, 55 new businesses were established in Winkler. The increase in new businesses can be attributed to low taxes, reasonably priced real estate and cooperation between the city and entrepreneurs. One example of this is the recently established Incubator Mall, a city-owned, five office facility that gives new businesses the opportunity to rent office space at moderate rates. Once those businesses outgrow the space, they relocate, making room for new startups.

A recent development is the rise of and competition in the technology industry in Winkler with startup internet service provider Valley Fiber and Bell MTS installing fiber optic cabling (fibre to the home) throughout the city.

== Government and politics ==
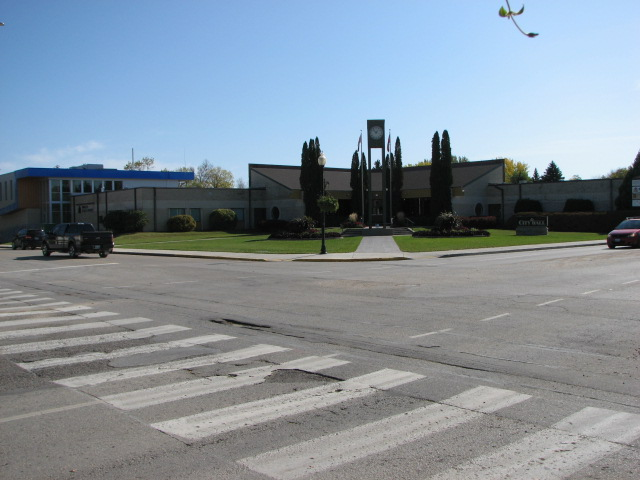
Winkler City Hall

Winkler is governed by a mayor and six councillors who are elected by residents. The current mayor of Winkler is Henry Siemens. The current Winkler city councillors are Marvin Plett, Peter Froese, Andrew Froese, Michael Grenier, Don Friesen, and Ryan Hildebrand.

Winkler is represented in the Legislative Assembly of Manitoba (as part of the Morden-Winkler riding) by Progressive Conservative MLA, Carrie Hiebert, and in the House of Commons of Canada (as part of the Portage—Lisgar riding) by Conservative MP, Branden Leslie.

== Transport ==
Winkler's chief transport connection to other communities is the highway system. Winnipeg is accessible from Winkler either via PTH 14 and PTH 3 or via PR 428 or PTH 23 and PTH 75 or PTH 14 and PTH 75. PTH 32 leads directly to the Winkler Port of Entry on the Canada–United States border. A 4-lane divided highway connects Winkler and the other major city of the region, Morden.

Winkler Airport (CKZ7, 49°10′N 097°55′W) is located in the city's industrial park. It has two runways: an 2,900 ft (880 m) turf/paved runway (09/27), and a 1,540 ft (470 m) turf runway (17/35). Aircraft which need a longer runway are advised to use the Morden Regional Aerodrome which is located 9 km (5.6 mi) from Winkler.

The city has three privately owned taxi services, Pembina Valley Taxi, Winkler Taxi Service, and Green Taxi Service. In 2024, Winkler launched a 3 year pilot project On-Demand Transit service offering shuttle service within city limits as well as to Boundary Trails Health Centre.

Canadian Pacific Railway has a spur line going into Winkler's industrial park that connects to the La Riviere subdivision, a secondary feeder line on the CPR network.

== Demographics ==
Historical population
Year	Pop.	±%
1901	391	—
1911	458	+17.1%
1921	812	+77.3%
1931	1,005	+23.8%
1941	957	−4.8%
1951	1,331	+39.1%
1961	2,529	+90.0%
1991	6,400	+153.1%
1996	7,245	+13.2%
2001	7,999	+10.4%
2006	9,106	+13.8%
2011	10,670	+17.2%
2016	12,660	+18.7%
2021	13,745	+8.6%

In the 2021 Census of Population conducted by Statistics Canada, Winkler had a population of 13,745 living in 5,089 of its 5,239 total private dwellings, a change of 8.6% from its 2016 population of 12,660. With a land area of 20.73 km^{2} (8.00 sq mi), it had a population density of 663.0/km^{2} (1,717.3/sq mi) in 2021.

There are 2,885 households, out of which 36.2% are married couples living together with children, 30.8% are married couples living together without children, 25.5% are one-person households and 7.6% are multiple-family households, single parent family households or non-family households other than one-person households. 90.2% of Winkler's 2,135 families are married couple families, while 1.4% are common-law couple families and 8.2% are single parent families. The average household size is 3.0 and the average family size is 3.3.

The age distribution is 21.6% under the age of 15, 8.5% from 15 to 19, 8.1% from 20 to 24, 25.3% from 25 to 44, 12.1% from 45 to 54, 7.1% from 55 to 64 and 17.2% who are 65 years of age or older. The median age is 34.3 years. For every 100 females there are 94.8 males.

The average income for a household in the city is $83,200. The average income for all workers is $38,40. The average income for full-time, full-year workers is $52,650.

15.9% of Winkler's population is foreign-born. 1,832 immigrants settled in Winkler from 1999 to 2004, with 465 arriving in 2004 alone. Due to the city's cultural roots, most recent immigrants to Winkler are ethnic Germans from the former Soviet Union, Germans originating from Germany, or returning Low German Mennonites from Latin America.

According to Statistics Canada's 2006 census data for Winkler residents over the age of 25, 66% have high school diplomas, of which 9% also hold university certificates, diplomas or degrees.

In 2024, a national study by Preply ranked Winkler as the second most culturally and linguistically diverse city in Canada, following Kitchener, Ontario. Between 2011–2015 and 2016–2021, Winkler saw a 79% increase in its immigrant population, with permanent residents making up 25% of the city's population by 2021. The study also found that nearly one-third of Winkler residents speak a non-official language at home.

=== Ethnicity ===
The most common ancestries in Winkler (as of 1996) are German (65.2%), Dutch (Netherlands) (24.7%), Canadian (23.0%), Russian (10.0%), Ukrainian (2.1%), French (1.5%), Aboriginal (1.2%), Scottish (1.0%), Irish (0.9%), Polish (0.8%) and Icelandic (0.2%). Most Winklerites are of Mennonite descent, which would most accurately be described as Dutch. The racial makeup of the city (as of 2001) is 98.8% White, 0.4% Chinese, 0.38% Aboriginal, 0.1% Black, 0.1% South Asian and 0.1% Southeast Asian.

Panethnic groups in the City of Winkler (2001−2021)
Panethnic group	2021		2016		2011		2006		2001	
Panethnic group	Pop.	%	Pop.	%	Pop.	%	Pop.	%	Pop.	%
European (Note: Statistic includes all persons that did not make up part of a visible minority or an indigenous identity.)	11,795	86.95%	11,405	91.9%	9,960	94.95%	8,635	96.75%	7,705	98.78%
Indigenous	490	3.61%	345	2.78%	260	2.48%	180	2.02%	30	0.38%
Southeast Asian (Note: Statistic includes total responses of "Filipino" and "Southeast Asian" under visible minority section on census.)	370	2.73%	140	1.13%	70	0.67%	10	0.11%	10	0.13%
South Asian	365	2.69%	195	1.57%	85	0.81%	10	0.11%	10	0.13%
African	170	1.25%	45	0.36%	0	0%	40	0.45%	10	0.13%
Latin American	160	1.18%	60	0.48%	60	0.57%	10	0.11%	0	0%
Middle Eastern (Note: Statistic includes total responses of "West Asian" and "Arab" under visible minority section on census.)	140	1.03%	50	0.4%	30	0.29%	0	0%	10	0.13%
East Asian (Note: Statistic includes total responses of "Chinese", "Korean", and "Japanese" under visible minority section on census.)	75	0.55%	105	0.85%	0	0%	30	0.34%	35	0.45%
Other/multiracial (Note: Statistic includes total responses of "Visible minority, n.i.e." and "Multiple visible minorities" under visible minority section on census.)	0	0%	75	0.6%	0	0%	10	0.11%	0	0%
Total responses	13,565	98.69%	12,410	98.03%	10,490	98.31%	8,925	98.01%	7,800	98.2%
Total population	13,745	100%	12,660	100%	10,670	100%	9,106	100%	7,943	100%
Note: Totals greater than 100% due to multiple origin responses

=== Religion ===
Religious make-up (Census)
Religion	Population (2021)	Pct (%)	Population (2001)	Pct (%)
Christian	11,550	85.17%	7570	97.11%
No-Religion/Secular	1,540	11.35%	205	2.63%
Sikh	180	1.32%	0	0.00%
Muslim	160	1.17%	10	0.13%
Hindu	55	0.40%	0	0.00%
Other	40	0.29%	10	0.13%
Jewish	25	0.18%	0	0.00%

== Culture ==
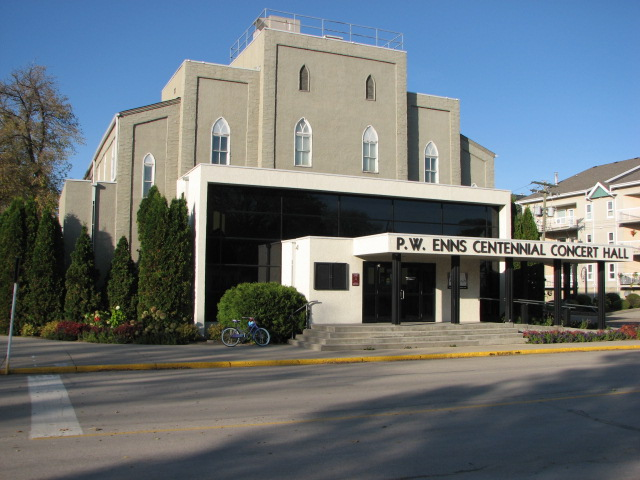
P.W. Enns Centennial Concert Hall

The Pembina Thresherman's Museum is situated on Highway 3 between Winkler and Morden. It includes a number of historical buildings in a village setting and a collection of agricultural machinery, tools and household items, as well as a meeting hall.

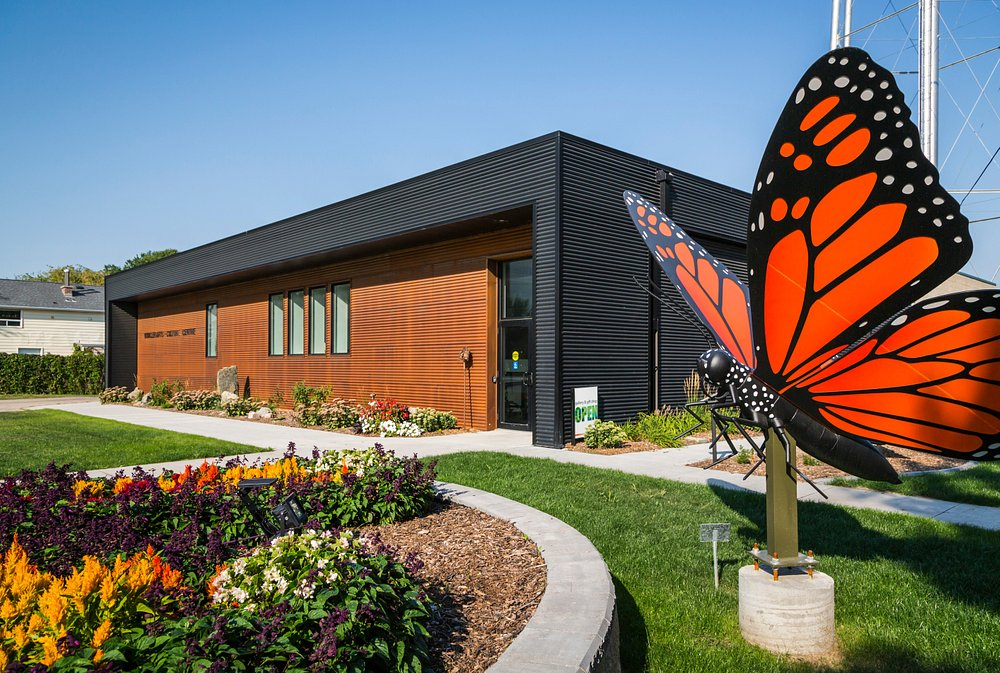
Winkler Arts and Culture Centre

Located in what was the city's utilities building, the Winkler Arts and Culture Centre organizes local art and cultural programming; including exhibitions, classes, and performances.

Winkler's main festival is the Harvest Festival and Exhibition. Held at the Winkler Parkland in mid-August, it features a parade, midway, live stage entertainment, fireworks, and more. Canada Day celebrations are held at the Winkler Parkland on July 1. The Cripple Creek Music Festival takes place on the fourth Sunday in July.

== Education ==
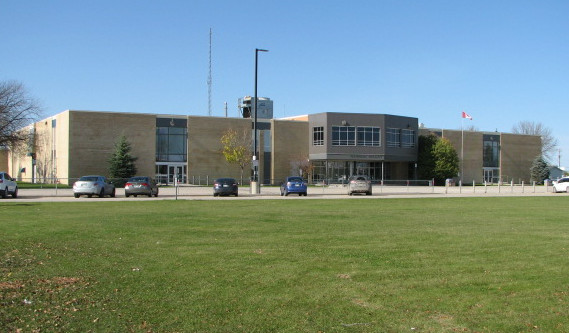
Garden Valley Collegiate

Winkler's public school system is the Garden Valley School Division, which consists of five elementary schools - Winkler Elementary School, Parkland Elementary School, J.R. Walkof School, Emerado Centennial School, Pine Ridge Elementary School - within city limits and six K-8 schools in the surrounding R.M. of Stanley: Prairie Dale School, Southwood Elementary School, Hochfeld School, Blumenfeld School, Plum Coulee School, and Border Valley School. The city has two high schools, Garden Valley Collegiate, established in 1966, and Northlands Parkway Collegiate, which opened in September 2013. As of June 2023, Garden Valley School Division had a total enrollment of 4,180 students. There are no private schools operating within the city.

Red River College also operates a regional campus in Winkler, serving 1,500 students each year.

== Media ==
=== Radio ===
Winkler is home to two radio stations, both of which are owned and operated by Altona-based Golden West Broadcasting. COUNTRY 88, a country music station, was established in 1980 on the AM dial at 1530 kHz, then moved to 1570 kHz in 1987, and since 2013, broadcasts on the FM dial at 88.9 MHz. CJEL-FM, an adult contemporary music station branded as The Eagle 93.5, launched in 2000 and is based in Winkler.

=== Newspapers ===
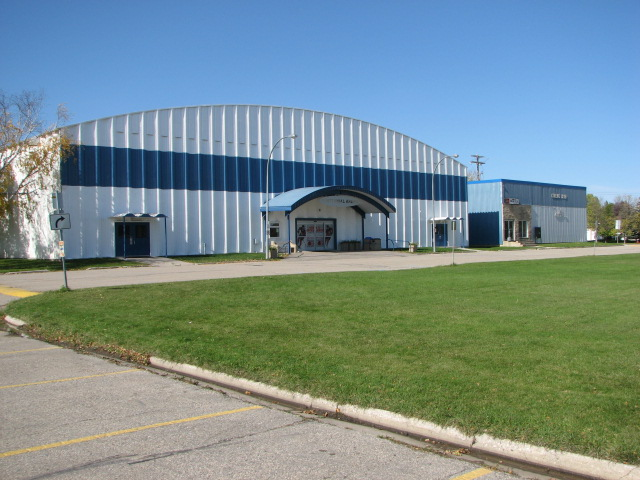
Centennial Arena and adjacent Curling Rink in Winkler, Manitoba

The Winkler-Morden Voice is published weekly and distributed by mail to households in both Winkler and Morden and many surrounding smaller communities. A former paper, The Winkler Times newspaper ceased publication in 2020.

== Sports ==
The Winkler Flyers compete in the Manitoba Junior Hockey League and play their home games at the Winkler Arena. Perhaps the best known alumnus of the team is Hockey Hall of Fame inductee Ed Belfour. There is also a minor league hockey in Winkler. The two local high schools have multiple sports teams under the names Zodiacs and Nighthawks. Winkler also has two men's soccer teams called the Winkler Storm, and the Riots. The women's soccer team is called the Hurricanes. Winkler was selected as host city for the 2008 edition of CBC Sports' day-long Hockey Day in Canada, which took place on February 9, 2008.

== Notable people ==
- Di Brandt, poet and literary critic
- Arnold Brown, politician
- Benjamin De Fehr, soldier executed during World War I
- The Color, Christian band
- Karen Doell, softball player
- Howard Dyck, conductor and broadcaster
- Jonathan Dyck, graphic novelist
- Larry Dyck, hockey player
- Peter Dyck, politician
- David Elias, writer
- Justin Falk, NHL player for the Buffalo Sabres
- Eric Fehr, NHL player for the Washington Capitals
- Byron Froese, NHL player for the Tampa Bay Lightning
- Jacob Froese, politician
- Peter J. Hooge, politician
- Ray Neufeld, former NHL player for the Hartford Whalers
- Jordan Peters, curler
- Tristan Peters, Major League Baseball player for the Tampa Bay Rays and Chicago White Sox
- Dustin Penner, former NHL player Anaheim Ducks
- John Sawatsky, award-winning author and journalist
- George Sawatzky, physicist, Fellow of the Royal Society of Canada
- Cornelius Wiebe, physician and politician
- Valentine Winkler, town founder
