= Manitoba Provincial Road 240 =

Provincial road in Manitoba, Canada

Provincial Road 240
- PR 240 highlighted in red

Route information
- Maintained by Department of Infrastructure
- Length: 122.8 km (76.3 mi)
- Existed: 1966–present

Major junctions
- South end: PTH 3 / PTH 31 near Darlingford
- PTH 23 near Miami; PR 245 in Roseisle; PR 305 near St. Claude; PTH 2 in St. Claude; PTH 1 (TCH) / YH in Portage la Prairie; PTH 1A (TCH) in Portage la Prairie; PR 227 in Oakland
- North end: Hackberry Avenue W in Delta Beach

Location
- Country: Canada
- Province: Manitoba
- Rural municipalities: Pembina, Thompson, Dufferin, Grey, Portage la Prairie
- Major cities: Portage la Prairie

Highway system
- Provincial highways in Manitoba; Winnipeg City Routes
← PR 239	→ PR 241

Provincial Road 240 (PR 240) is a 122.8-kilometre-long (76.3 mi) north–south highway in the Pembina Valley and Central Plains regions of Manitoba, connecting the hamlets of Darlingford, Miami, Roseisle, and St. Claude with the city of Portage la Prairie, as well as providing the only road access to the hamlet of Delta Beach on Lake Manitoba.

== Route description ==
PR 240 begins just outside Darlingford at a junction between PTH 3 (Boundary Commission Trail) and PTH 31 in the Municipality of Pembina, directly across from the Manitoba Historical Society's Pierre Gaultier de Varennes, sieur de Vérendrye Journey to the Mandans monument. It heads north as a gravel road to cross a railroad and have an intersection with Road 14N, which leads straight into downtown Darlingford. The highway enters the Rural Municipality of Thompson and almost immediately goes through a switchback before passing by the Skyview Colony Hutterite community. PR 240 goes through a pass as it crosses a deep valley before running concurrently with PTH 23. Now paved, the highway heads east to pass by Alexander Ridge Park before PR 240 splits off as a gravel road again just prior to reaching the hamlet of Miami. PR 240 travels through the locality of Five Corners before entering the Rural Municipality of Dufferin.

PR 240 becomes concurrent with PR 245 between Stephenfield Provincial Park and the community of Roseisle before heading north again to cross the Boyne River. The highway has an intersection with PR 305, where PR 240 becomes paved, before entering the Rural Municipality of Grey. It now enters the hamlet of St. Claude, mostly travelling along the community's western edge to cross a railroad and have an intersection with PTH 2 (Red Coat Trail). PR 240 now leaves St. Claude and heads north through rural areas for the next several kilometers to cross into the Rural Municipality of Portage la Prairie at an intersection with Road 54N, which provides access to the Rock Road ATV Park.

PR 240 goes through some switchbacks before making a sharp curve to the west and coming to an intersection between PR 331 and Centennaire Drive, provides access to Southport and the Portage la Prairie/Southport Airport). PR 240 turns north again here and now crosses a bridge over the Assiniboine River to enter the Portage la Prairie city limits and have a large interchange with PTH 1 (Trans-Canada Highway/Yellowhead Highway), where it becomes known as River Road. It travels through neighbourhoods as it passes along the northern coastline of Crescent Lake before making a slight right turn onto Fifth Street SE. The highway passes a hospital and then runs concurrently with PTH 1A (Saskatchewan Avenue E) and the highway heads west as a four-lane divided boulevard to enter the center of downtown, where PR 240 splits off and heads north as a two-lane along Tupper Street N. PR 240 crosses a railroad to travel past several neighbourhoods before leaving Portage la Prairie and passing through rural farmland for the next several kilometres, where it travels past the First Homestead in Western Canada National Historic Site.

It has a short concurrency with PR 227 in the hamlet of Oakland before continuing north through first farmland, then some marshy areas, before entering Delta Beach and coming to an end at an intersection with Hackberry Avenue W, just metres from the coastline of southern Lake Manitoba. With the exception of the PTH 1A concurrency in Portage la Prairie, the entire length of Provincial Road 240 is a two-lane highway.

== Major intersections ==
Division	Location	km	mi	Destinations	Notes
Pembina		0.0	0.0	PTH 3 (Boundary Commission Trail) – Manitou, Morden; PTH 31 south – Langdon, North Dakota	Southern terminus; northern terminus of PTH 31; southern end of unpaved section; road continues south as PTH 31
Pembina		1.6	0.99	Road 14N – Darlingford	
Thompson		19.3	12.0	Road 24N – Skyview Colony	
Thompson		21.3	13.2	PTH 23 west – Altamount	Southern end of PTH 23 concurrency
Thompson		22.9	14.2	PTH 23 east – Miami	Northern end of PTH 23 concurrency
Dufferin		37.7	23.4	PR 245 east – Carman, Stephenfield Provincial Park	Southern end of PR 245 concurrency
Dufferin	Roseisle	39.3	24.4	PR 245 west – Notre Dame de Lourdes; Hillview Road – Roseisle	Northern end of PR 245 concurrency
Dufferin		42.0	26.1	Bridge over the Boyne River	
Dufferin		49.3	30.6	PR 305	Northern end of unpaved section
Grey	St. Claude	57.5	35.7	PTH 2 (Red Coat Trail) – Treherne, Winnipeg	
Portage la Prairie		91.9	57.1	PR 331 east – Oakville; Centennaire Drive – Southport, Portage la Prairie/Southport Airport	Western terminus of PR 331
Portage la Prairie		92.5– 92.7	57.5– 57.6	Bridge over the Assiniboine River	
City of Portage la Prairie		94.1– 94.7	58.5– 58.8	PTH 1 (TCH) / YH – Winnipeg, Brandon	Interchange
City of Portage la Prairie		96.8	60.1	PTH 1A (TCH) east (Saskatchewan Avenue E)	Southern end of PTH 1A concurrency
City of Portage la Prairie		97.4	60.5	PTH 1A (TCH) east (Saskatchewan Avenue W)	Northern end of PTH 1A concurrency
Portage la Prairie		107.4	66.7	First Homestead in Western Canada National Historic Site	Access road to National Historic Site
Portage la Prairie		112.4	69.8	PR 227 east – Warren	Southern end of PR 227 concurrency
Portage la Prairie	Oakland	114.1	70.9	PR 227 west – Oakland	Northern end of PR 227 concurrency
Portage la Prairie	Delta Beach	122.8	76.3	Hackberry Avenue W	Northern terminus
1.000 mi = 1.609 km; 1.000 km = 0.621 mi: Concurrency terminus
