= Manitoba Highway 13 =

Provincial highway in Manitoba, Canada

Provincial Trunk Highway 13
- PTH 13 highlighted in red
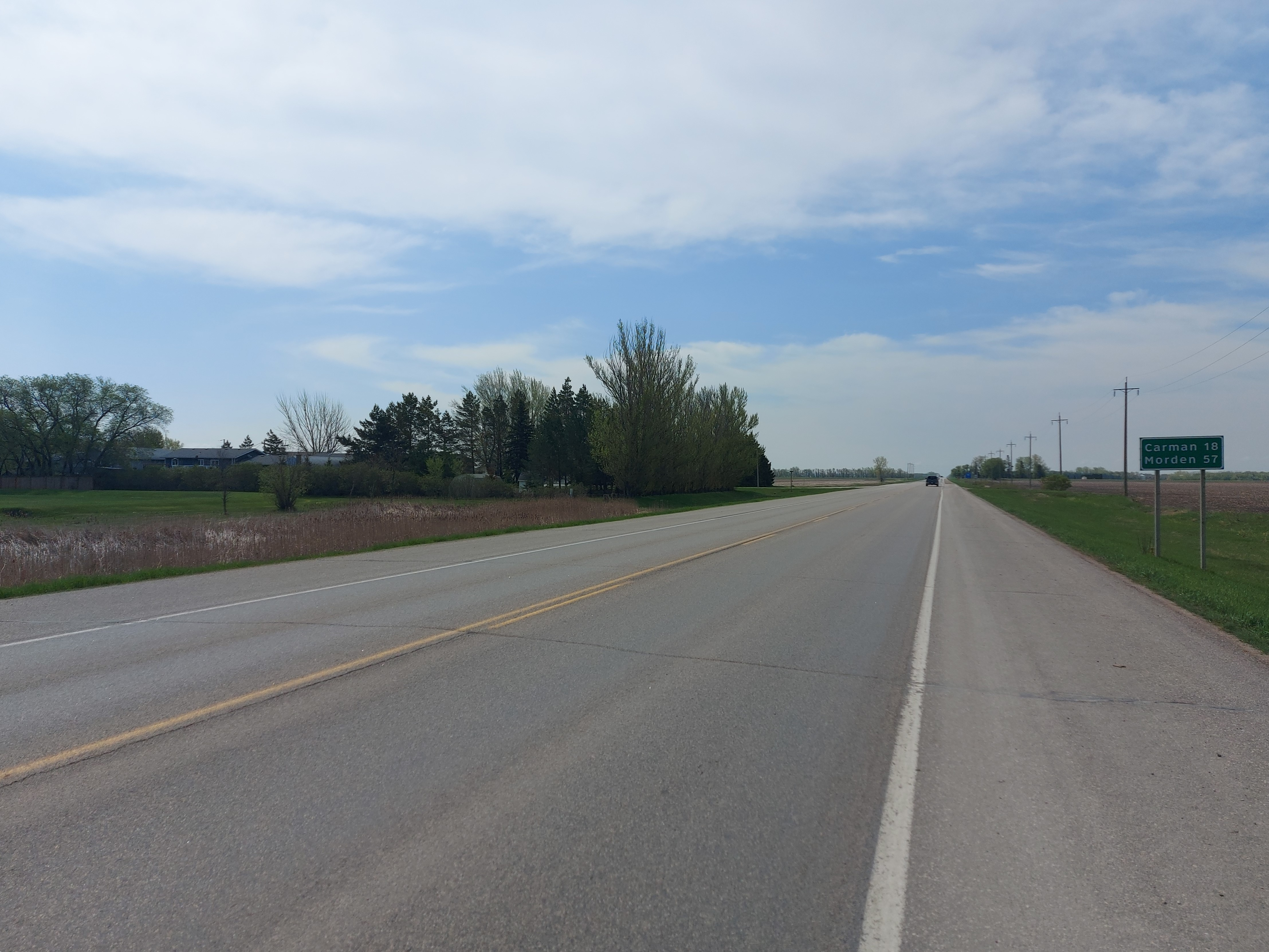
- Highway 13 on the south side of Elm Creek

Route information
- Maintained by Manitoba Infrastructure
- Length: 50.8 km (31.6 mi)
- Existed: 1947–present

Major junctions
- South end: PTH 3 / PR 245 in Carman
- PTH 2 near Elm Creek
- North end: PTH 1 (TCH) / PR 430 near Oakville

Location
- Country: Canada
- Province: Manitoba
- Rural municipalities: Dufferin; Grey; Portage la Prairie
- Towns: Carman

Highway system
- Provincial highways in Manitoba; Winnipeg City Routes
← PTH 12	→ PTH 14

Provincial Trunk Highway 13 (PTH 13) is a provincial highway in the Canadian province of Manitoba. It is an RTAC route capable of handling RTAC vehicles such as trucks, truck and pony trailers, trucks and full trailers, truck tractors, and semi-trailers, A-trains, B-trains, or C-trains. The route extends south to north from its junction with PTH 3 and PR 245 in Carman to its junction with PTH 1 and PR 430 north of Oakville. The northern terminus of PTH 13 is located between Portage la Prairie and Manitoba's capital city Winnipeg. The Central Manitoba Railway (CEMR) shortline rail intersects PTH 13 north of Carman, the Canadian Pacific Railway (CPR) intersects at Elm Creek, and the Canadian National Railway (CNR) at Oakville.

== Route description ==
PTH 13 begins in the town of Carman at an intersection between PTH 3 and PR 245 (Main Street S / 4 Avenue (SW/SE)), with PTH 13 heading north as a four-lane divided boulevard, Main Street S, into downtown Carman. The highway heads straight through the centre of downtown, crossing the Boyne River along a two-lane bridge before temporarily widening back out to a four-lane heading through a neighbourhood as Main Street N. The road narrows to two lanes for the final time at a railroad crossing and passes through a business district before leaving Carman and entering the Rural Municipality of Dufferin.

PTH 13 heads due north, crossing the Norquay Channel and having an intersection with PR 305 in Barnsley before entering the Rural Municipality of Grey. The highway travels along the western side of Elm Creek, where it has a junction with PTH 2 (Red Coat Trail), before continuing through rural farmland for the next several kilometres into the Rural Municipality of Portage la Prairie.

The highway crosses a couple of small creeks several times before passing through the town of Oakville, where it has a railroad crossing and a junction with PR 331. Shortly thereafter, PTH 13 comes to an end at an intersection with PTH 1 (Trans-Canada Highway / Yellowhead Highway), with the roadway continuing on towards St. Ambroise, St. Ambroise Beach Provincial Park, and Lake Manitoba as PR 430.

== History ==
The original PTH 13 went from the PTH 14 Junction in Emerson southeast to the Minnesota border. This was eliminated in 1942. PTH 13 first appeared on the 1947-48 Manitoba Highway Map. Originally, it served as a short connector route spanning 20 kilometres (12 mi) between its current southern terminus with PTH 3 in Carman and PTH 2 near Elm Creek.

PTH 13 was extended further north and east in 1957 to meet PTH 1 near St. Francois Xavier. The following year, the highway was shortened to its current northern terminus north of Oakville when PTH 1 was reconfigured to its current route.

On September 12, 2007, the Manitoba government entered to cost share safety improvements at a railway crossing at Highway 13 near Oakville to provide an automated advance warning system.

== Major intersections ==
Division	Location	km	mi	Destinations	Notes
Town of Carman		0.0	0.0	PTH 3 / PR 245 west (Main Street S / 4 Avenue) – Morden, Winnipeg, Roseisle	Southern terminus; continues as PTH 3 west
Dufferin		10.3	6.4	PR 305 – Brunkild, Ste. Agathe	
Grey	Elm Creek	20.1	12.5	PTH 2 (Red Coat Trail) – Oak Bluff, Souris, Treherne	
Portage la Prairie	Oakville	48.2	30.0	PR 331 west – Newton	
Portage la Prairie		50.8	31.6	PTH 1 (TCH) / YH – Brandon, Winnipeg PR 430 north – St. Ambrose	Northern terminus; continues as PR 430 north
1.000 mi = 1.609 km; 1.000 km = 0.621 mi
