= Manitoba Provincial Road 430 =

Provincial road in Manitoba, Canada

Provincial Road 430

Route information
- Maintained by Department of Infrastructure
- Length: 38.8 km (24.1 mi)
- Existed: 1966–present

Major junctions
- South end: PTH 1 (TCH) / PTH 13 / YH near Oakville
- PTH 26 near Poplar Point; PR 227 near Poplar Point
- North end: St. Ambroise Beach Provincial Park

Location
- Country: Canada
- Province: Manitoba
- Rural municipalities: Portage la Prairie, Woodlands

Highway system
- Provincial highways in Manitoba; Winnipeg City Routes
← PR 428	→ PR 432

Provincial Road 430 (PR 430) is a 38.8-kilometre-long (24.1 mi) north–south highway in the Central Plains Region of Manitoba. Serving as a northern continuation of PTH 13, it provides access to the towns of Poplar Point and St. Ambroise, as well as St. Ambroise Beach Provincial Park on the southern shores of Lake Manitoba.

== Route description ==
PR 430 begins in the Rural Municipality of Portage la Prairie at an intersection between PTH 1 (Trans-Canada Highway / Yellowhead Highway) and the north end of PTH 13, just north of Oakville. It heads due north to cross the La Salle River as it travels through rural farmland, passing by the Norquay Hutterite Colony and having an intersection with River Road (Former PR 426). After crossing the Assiniboine River, the highway junctions with PTH 26 (Chemin Assiniboine Trail) just west of the town of Poplar Point before temporarily entering the Rural Municipality of Woodlands for a few kilometres. Re-entering the Rural Municipality of Portage la Prairie, PR 430 has an intersection with PR 227 before curving more northwest, travelling through some forested areas to have a junction with PR 411 and pass through the town of St. Ambroise. Leaving town, it has an intersection with Beach Road, which provides access to St. Ambroise Beach Provincial Park, before coming to a dead end along the beach of Lake Manitoba. The entire length of PR 430 is a paved, two-lane highway.

== Major intersections ==
Division	Location	km	mi	Destinations	Notes
Portage la Prairie		0.0	0.0	PTH 1 (TCH) / YH – Winnipeg, Portage la Prairie; PTH 13 south – Oakville, Carman	Southern terminus; northern terminus of PTH 13
Portage la Prairie		0.9	0.56	Bridge over the La Salle River	
Portage la Prairie		8.0	5.0	River Road – St. Eustache	Former PR 426 south
Portage la Prairie		8.6– 8.8	5.3– 5.5	Bridge over the Assiniboine River	
Portage la Prairie		10.6	6.6	PTH 26 (Chemin Assiniboine Trail) – Portage la Prairie, Poplar Point	
Woodlands	No major junctions				
Portage la Prairie		18.8	11.7	PR 227 – Westbourne, Warren	
Portage la Prairie	St. Ambroise	32.4	20.1	PR 411 east – Woodlands	Western terminus of PR 411
Portage la Prairie	St. Ambroise	36.9	22.9	Beach Road – St. Ambroise Beach Provincial Park	Access road into park
Portage la Prairie		38.8	24.1	Lake Manitoba	Dead end; northern terminus
1.000 mi = 1.609 km; 1.000 km = 0.621 mi
