= Manitoba Highway 26 =

Highway in Manitoba

Provincial Trunk Highway 26
- Chemin Assiniboine Trail
- PTH 26 highlighted in red

Route information
- Maintained by Department of Infrastructure
- Length: 62.6 km (38.9 mi)
- Existed: 1968–present

Major junctions
- West end: PTH 1 (TCH) / YH near Portage la Prairie
- East end: PTH 1 (TCH) / YH near St. François Xavier

Location
- Country: Canada
- Province: Manitoba
- Rural municipalities: Portage la Prairie; St. François Xavier

Highway system
- Provincial highways in Manitoba; Winnipeg City Routes
← PTH 25	→ PTH 27

Provincial Trunk Highway 26 (PTH 26), also known as Chemin Assiniboine Trail, is a provincial highway in the Canadian province of Manitoba. It is an east–west route that begins and ends at the Trans-Canada Highway (PTH 1). The western terminus is located near the interchange of PTH 1 and PTH 1A approximately 3 kilometres (1.9 miles) east of Portage la Prairie, while the eastern terminus is 3 kilometres (1.9 miles) southeast of St. François Xavier and 13 kilometres (8 miles) west of Winnipeg's Perimeter Highway. PTH 26 provides access to the small communities of St. François Xavier and Poplar Point. It serves as an alternative scenic route between Portage la Prairie and Winnipeg as it closely follows the Assiniboine River which flows south of the highway. The speed limit on this highway is 90 kilometres per hour (56 mph).

== Route description ==
PTH 26 begins just outside of the Portage la Prairie city limits at a junction with PTH 1 (Trans-Canada Highway / Yellowhead Highway) in the Rural Municipality of Portage la Prairie. The highway heads north for 0.5 kilometres (0.31 mi) to turn right onto the original alignment of the Trans-Canada. It heads northeast for a few kilometers, passing along the southern edge of High Bluff as it begins paralleling the Assiniboine River. PTH 26 crosses a small creek and has an intersection with PR 430, prior to passing through the town of Poplar Point.

PTH 26 enters the Rural Municipality of St. Francois Xavier, turning southeast along the banks of the Assiniboine River for the next several kilometers, having a short concurrency (overlap) with PR 248 and traveling through the communities of Pigeon Lake and St. Francois Xavier, where the highway forms the main thoroughfare. PTH 26 comes to an end shortly thereafter at another junction with PTH 1 (Trans-Canada Highway / Yellowhead Highway).

The entire length of Manitoba Highway 26 is a rural, paved, two-lane highway.

== History ==
Between 1928 and 1938, the number PTH 26 was used for the portion of highway between Brandon and Minnedosa. This became part of PTH 10 in 1938.

Prior to 1958, the current PTH 26 was part of the original PTH 1. Most of PTH 1's current route between Winnipeg and Portage la Prairie, which provides a more direct course, was constructed in 1958. The section that was replaced by the new route, the current-day PTH 26, was then designated as part of the transprovincial PTH 4, along with current PTH 9, 16, and 44.

In 1968, it was again renumbered to its current designation.

== Major intersections ==
Division	Location	km	mi	Destinations	Notes
Portage la Prairie		0.0	0.0	PTH 1 (TCH) / YH – Portage la Prairie, Winnipeg	Western terminus
Portage la Prairie		0.5	0.31	Assiniboine Trail	Former alignment; to PTH 1A
Portage la Prairie		5.3	3.3	Road 30W	Former PR 526 north
Portage la Prairie		13.4	8.3	Road 71N – Macdonald	Former PR 249 west
Portage la Prairie		17.7	11.0	PR 430 – St. Ambroise, Oakville	
Portage la Prairie	Poplar Point	21.0	13.0	Bridge Road south	Former PR 430
St. François Xavier		31.2	19.4	Jubilee Road	Former PR 221 east
St. François Xavier		38.3	23.8	PR 248 south – St. Eustache	West end of PR 248 concurrency
St. François Xavier		39.9	24.8	PR 248 north – Marquette	East end of PR 248 concurrency
St. François Xavier		51.2	31.8	Meadows Road 6W	Former PR 412 north
St. François Xavier		62.6	38.9	PTH 1 (TCH) / YH – Brandon, Winnipeg	Eastern terminus
1.000 mi = 1.609 km; 1.000 km = 0.621 mi: Concurrency terminus
