= 2007 Southern Manitoba tornado outbreak =

2007 tornado outbreak in Canada

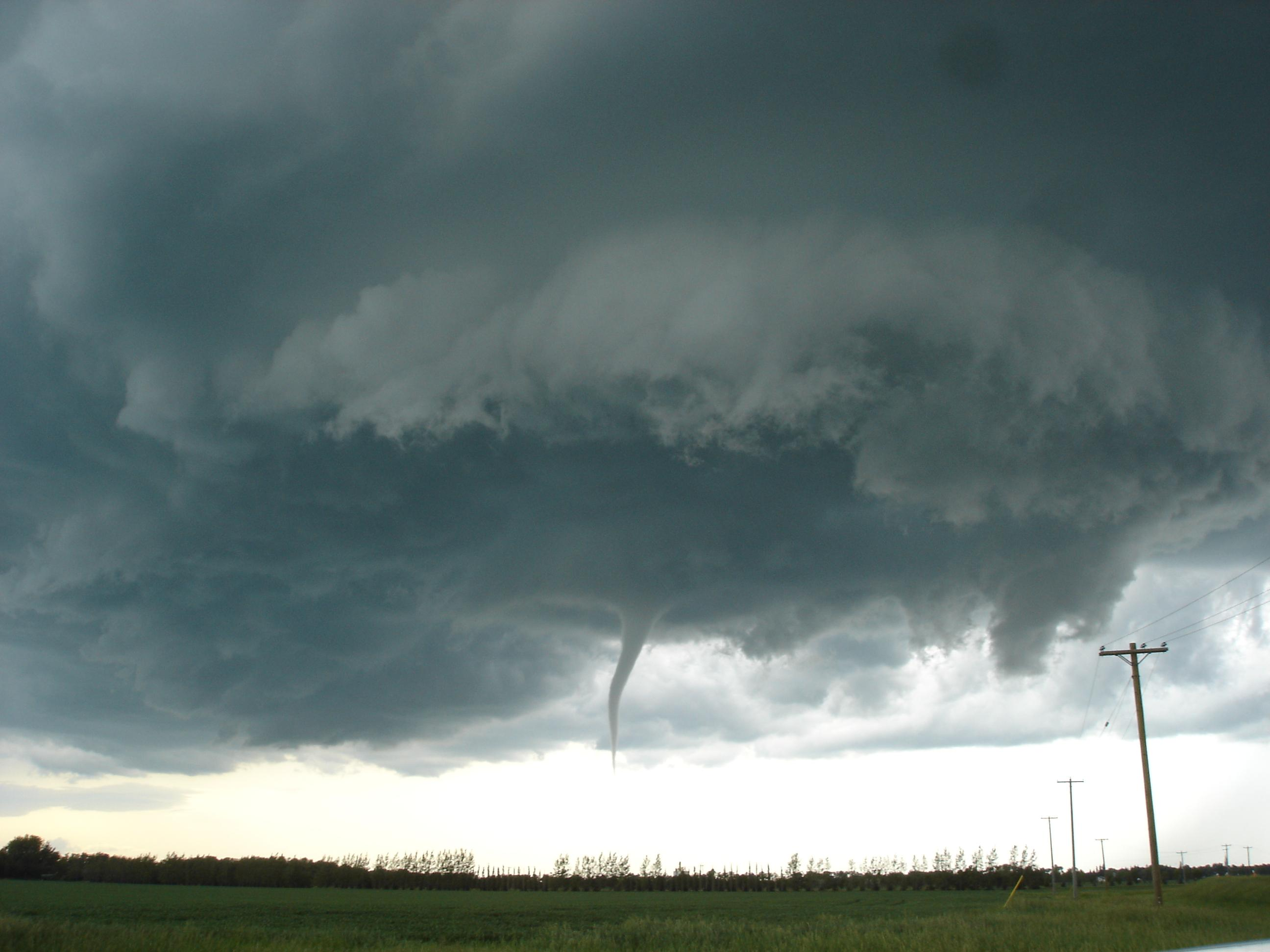
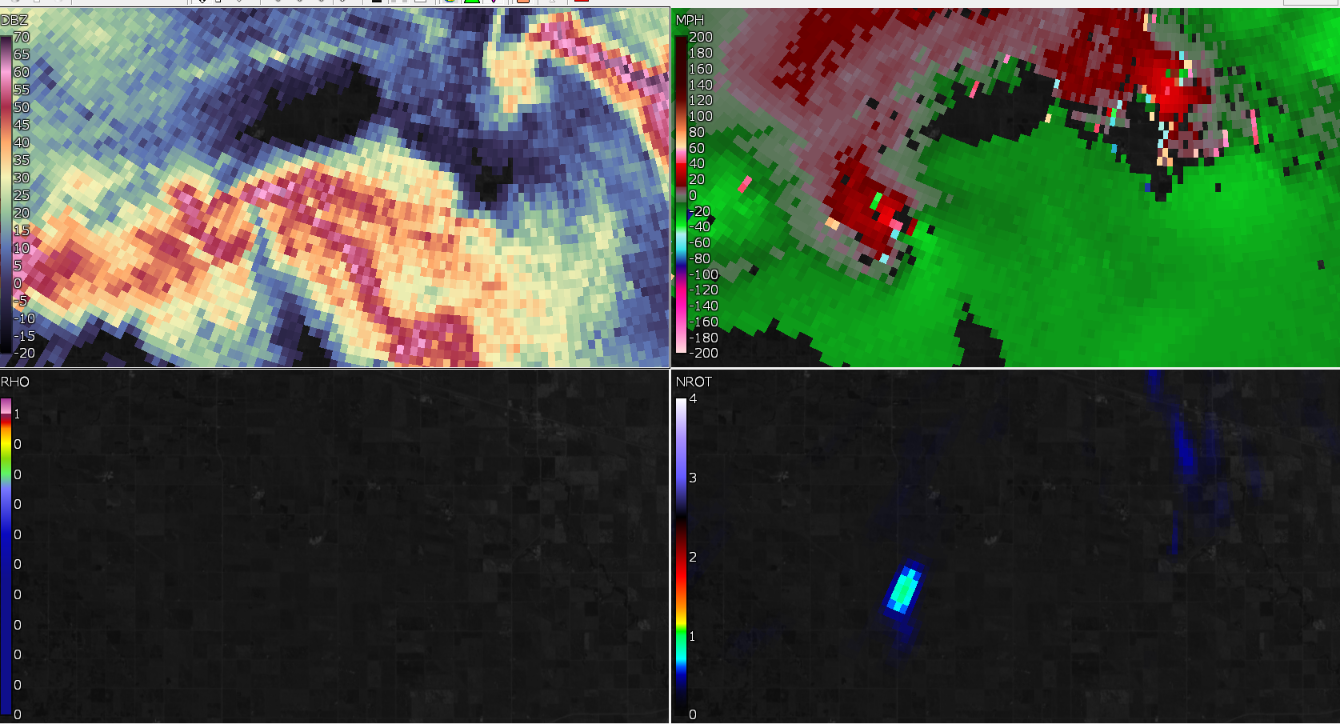
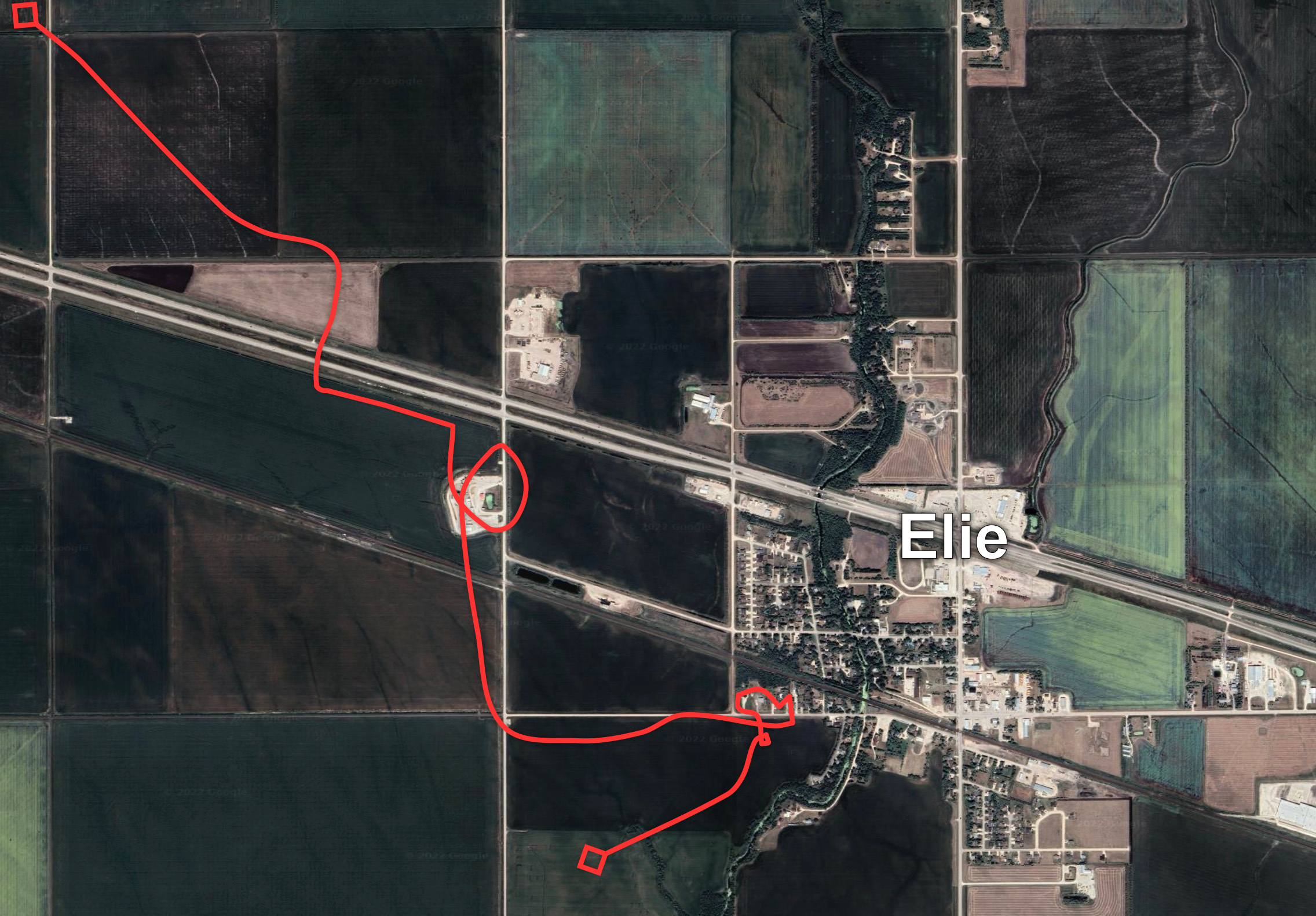
- Clockwise from top: A funnel cloud extending from a mesocyclone, which would eventually become the Elie tornado; a path map, depicting the sporadic trajectory of the Elie tornado; the Elie, Manitoba (right) and Oakville, Manitoba (left) tornadoes on June 22, seen from the same vantage point; radar imagery of the Oakville, Manitoba tornado as it began to form

Meteorological history
- Duration: June 22–23, 2007

Tornado outbreak
- Tornadoes: 7
- Max. rating: F5 tornado
- Duration: 2 days
- Highest winds: Tornadic – 261 mph (420 km/h) (Elie, Manitoba F5 on June 22)
- Largest hail: 2.75 inches (7.0 cm) in Morden, Manitoba on June 22)

Overall effects
- Casualties: None
- Damage: $41.1 million (2007 CAD)
- Areas affected: Southern Manitoba, Canada
- Part of the Tornadoes of 2007

During June 22–23, 2007, a localized but potent tornado outbreak affected the Canadian province of Manitoba, particularly the southern part of the province. Despite the small scale of this outbreak, it featured various significant (F2+) tornadoes, including the Elie, Manitoba F5 tornado on June 22, for which the outbreak is most well-known. In addition to the Elie tornado, the system produced three F3 tornadoes: the Oakville, Manitoba tornado on June 22, the Pipestone, Manitoba tornado on June 23, and the Minto–Baldur, Manitoba tornado on June 23.

The environmental setup that accompanied this outbreak was unseasonably intense, especially for the province of Manitoba, which has only seen one violent (F4/EF4+) tornado since the Elie tornado. No casualties (injuries or fatalities) were reported during this outbreak sequence. However, damage costs from the Elie tornado alone amounted to $39,000,000 (2007 CAD). The other significant tornadoes from this outbreak did cause structural damage, but the costs of this damage were not recorded.

Many scientific curiosities came with this tornado outbreak. Most notable was the F5-level damage that the Elie tornado caused, as the tornado was rated F5 through videographic evidence of a well-anchored home failing and being lofted 75 ft (23 m) into the air by the tornado, before being thrown around the funnel and disintegrated midair. At the time of this damage, the Elie tornado was roping out and was a mere 45 yd (41 m) wide. It has been suspected that conservation of angular momentum, as well as the vortex breakdown that the tornado was undergoing, may have caused it to strengthen dramatically.

== Meteorological Synopsis ==
Prior to the event, 1200 UTC 500-mb mesoscale analysis revealed the presence of a building upper ridge over the southern Prairies region of Canada, specifically in the southern Alberta and Saskatchewan regions, with a minor shortwave trough accompanying this ridge over Alberta. A thermal ridge was also noted in the southern Saskatchewan area, preventing storm formation and increasing heating in the upper atmosphere. Winds contained within a jet max at 800 hPa reached 10-15 m s⁻¹ (22-34 mph) as they rounded the western half of a high pressure ridge situated over the High Plains. This intense jet stream continually advected moisture from the Gulf of Mexico, allowing any developing storms to have access to large amounts of inflow. The directional and magnitudinal change of wind with height, known as wind shear, was also observed during this time, further contributing to an environment favorable for storm development.

The associated reflectivity and velocity presentations of the Elie tornado (Storm B) and Oakville tornado (Storm C) at 0000 UTC June 23.

At the surface, multiple disconnected lows were present, with one surface low over southern Saskatchewan featuring a warm front that extended to the east, into the Interlake region of the province of Manitoba. Due to this low, warm temperatures and high dew point values were advected into the region, increasing instability in the atmosphere. By 1800 UTC, this surface low had moved east and positioned itself directly over Dauphin Lake, with surrounding temperatures reaching 26-28°C (79-82°F), and dew points skyrocketing to 18-20°C (64-68°F). At this time, a significant elevated mixed layer (EML) remained over the area, preventing convection and storm activity but allowing for instability to continue to rise. By 2100 UTC, the area of low pressure had finally migrated to the southern basin of Lake Manitoba, and remained quasi-stationary for hours, with the Elie tornado initiating off of a dry line ahead of a cold front that extended from the low. It is noted that a cold pool and gravity waves may have affected the development of the Elie tornado, as well as other tornadoes in the surrounding area.

== Confirmed tornadoes ==
Confirmed tornadoes by Fujita rating
FU	F0	F1	F2	F3	F4	F5	Total
0	0	3	0	3	0	1	7 (Note: According to https://web.archive.org/web/20160307165245/http://recordmeteo.com/tornado-canada/tornado-saskatchewan-2007-6-23-en-297.html, an F1 tornado was recorded near the hamlets of Lampman and Steelman, Saskatchewan. However, the official Environment and Climate Change Canada (ECCC) database does not recognize this tornado, and no verifiable sources mention the tornado. No media exists of the tornado or its damage. Because the fact that this tornado even happened cannot be confirmed, it has not been included. The same recordmeteo website also mentions an F0 tornado near Carnduff, Saskatchewan, which has no verifiable source.)

=== June 22 event ===
List of confirmed tornadoes – Friday, June 22, 2007 (Note: All dates are based on the local time zone where the tornado touched down; however, all times are in Coordinated Universal Time for consistency.)
F#	Location	District / Municipality	Province / Territory	Start Coord.	Time (UTC)	Path length	Max width
F5	Elie	Central Plains	MB	49.90°N 97.76°W	23:25–00:00	6 km (3.7 mi)	137 m (150 yd)
F5	See article on this tornado						
F3	S of Oakville to Fannystelle	Central Plains	MB	49.80°N 97.93°W	23:55–?	10 km (6.2 mi)	200 m (220 yd)
F3	See section on this tornado						
EF1 (Note: At the time that this outbreak occurred, the Enhanced Fujita scale was in use in the United States. This tornado is tallied in the closest F-Scale equivalent on this table, which is F1.)	S of Upham	McHenry	ND	48.4933°N 100.72°W	00:30–00:45	0.5 mi (0.80 km)	250 yd (230 m)
EF1	This tornado struck a farmstead, unroofing a chicken coop and shifting a barn off its foundation. Several trees were damaged.						

=== June 23 event ===
List of confirmed tornadoes – Saturday, June 23, 2007
F#	Location	District / Municipality	Province / Territory	Start Coord.	Time (UTC)	Path length	Max width
F1	Oak Lake Reserve to E of Pipestone	Pipestone	MB	49.63°N 101.02°W	00:40–?	20 km (12 mi)	300 m (330 yd)
F1	This tornado touched down at approximately 00:40 UTC June 24 (7:40 p.m. CDT June 23), producing F1 damage along a 20 km (12 mi) path from Oak Lake Reserve to the Pipestone area; the tornado had a maximum documented width of 300 m (330 yd). Videos of this tornado and its associated storm exist online.						
F3	S of Pipestone to S of Minto	Pipestone	MB	49.480°N 100.830°W	01:15–?	60 km (37 mi)	1,800 m (2,000 yd)
F3	This large wedge tornado formed near Pipestone, Manitoba at 01:15 UTC June 24 (8:15 p.m. CDT June 23), reportedly destroying two homes and damaging several tree lines along a 60 km (37 mi) path. This tornado was captured on video, with storm chasers documenting the highly visible multi-vortex structure of the tornado.						
F3	S of Minto to S of Baldur	Argyle	MB	49.362°N 100.068°W	02:10–?	55 km (34 mi)	800 m (870 yd)
F3	This tornado impacted areas south of Minto and Baldur in Manitoba. Though no significant property damage was found, extreme treefall damage, as well as damage to vegetation in general, was observed. Lines of trees were sheared and debarked throughout the tornado's 55 km (34 mi) path. Because the supercell that produced the Baldur tornado had become increasingly rainwrapped, no official photos of the tornado's funnel exist.						
F1	Seven Sisters Falls	Whitemouth	MB	50.12°N 96.02°W	04:00	Unknown	Unknown
F1	This tornado touched down north of Seven Sisters Falls, Manitoba at 04:00 UTC June 24 (11:00 p.m. CDT June 23). No information is known about this tornado, beyond the fact that it caused F1-level damage and did not result in any deaths or injuries. The path length, width, and duration of this tornado are unknown.						

=== Elie, Manitoba ===
Elie, Manitoba
- The tornado approaching the town of Elie, Manitoba, around 6:50 p.m. CDT

Meteorological history
- Formed: June 22, 2007, 6:25 p.m. CDT (UTC–05:00)
- Dissipated: June 22, 2007, 7:00 p.m. CDT (UTC–05:00)
- Duration: 35 minutes

F5 tornado
- on the Fujita scale
- Max width: 137 metres (150 yd)
- Path length: 6.0 km (3.7 mi)
- Highest winds: >261 mph (420 km/h)

Overall effects
- Casualties: None
- Damage: $39 million (2007 CAD)
- Areas affected: Elie, Manitoba, Canada

This narrow and erratic tornado tracked primarily southeast, as opposed to the usual northeasterly motion of tornadoes, and it made multiple loops and sharp turns as it approached Elie, Manitoba. While several houses were leveled, no injuries or deaths were recorded. A well-built, anchored home in Elie, equipped with 2x6 sill plates, J-bolts, and larger-than-typical washers, was completely removed from its foundation, with the entire house being lofted 75 ft (23 m) by the tornado and disintegrated midair. The Elie tornado was initially rated F4 due to concerns with its slow and erratic motion allowing the tornado to "relentlessly pound" the homes that it struck. However, based on a surveyor-led reanalysis, the tornado was upgraded to an F5 rating. A video that had resurfaced online, showing the Elie tornado causing a swift failure to a bolted home and lofting it into the air, prompted the upgrade, as surveyors were able to confirm that the failure of the home was instantaneous.

The Elie tornado is the only tornado in Canadian history to have officially received an F5 rating. It is also the most recent F5 tornado worldwide, as several countries gradually adopted the Enhanced Fujita scale after its introduction in the United States in 2007; Canada adopted the enhanced scale in 2013.

The tornado initially touched down north of the Trans-Canada Highway at 6:25 p.m. CDT (23:25 UTC) and slowly tracked southeast, displacing and overturning a semi-trailer and a tractor trailer along the Trans-Canada Highway. Making multiple erratic turns, the tornado crossed the highway, made another turn south, and directly struck the town's flour mill, causing over $1 million in damage. Initially, the tornado did not cause significant damage to the flour mill, but it made an extremely slow loop and struck the flour mill again, this time at F2 intensity. By the time the tornado exited the flour mill, it had grown to a width of 50 m (55 yd). It then headed south, paralleling Janzen Road at F0 intensity. It also continued to grow in width, reaching its peak width of about 140 m (153 yd).

F5-level damage caused by the Elie tornado. Note the bolted sill plates remaining on the foundation. This indicates that the home transferred the wind load from the tornado to the foundation.

After reaching the intersection of Janzen Road and Road 61 North, the tornado turned east, and began to move directly towards the southwest edge of Elie. It quickly intensified to F4 strength as it made a loop over Elie Street, severely damaging multiple homes in the process. One of these homes, which was described as well-built and bolted to its foundation, was completely removed from its foundation and lofted into the air by the tornado, where it then collapsed into pieces as it was thrown around the tornado's funnel. The tornado also sheared some sill plates from this home and snapped off the bolts that supported these sill plates. Trees were debarked as well, and various vehicles were thrown. Two other houses sustained F4 level damage, with both of them being almost completely swept from their foundations, and another house to the west also sustained F2-F3 level damage. The tornado lingered over Elie Street for approximately four minutes, before exiting Elie and dissipating shortly afterwards.

The tornado traveled about 6 km (3.7 mi) in total and was 150 yards (140 m) wide at its widest during its 35-minute lifespan. No injuries or fatalities were recorded. At least $39 million (2007 CAD) in damage costs was incurred.

=== Oakville–Elm Creek–Fannystelle, Manitoba ===
Oakville–Elm Creek–Fannystelle, Manitoba
- The tornado, as it appeared near Elm Creek, Manitoba

Meteorological history
- Formed: June 22, 2007, 6:55 p.m. CDT (UTC−05:00)
- Dissipated: June 22, 2007, 7:10 p.m. CDT (UTC−05:00)
- Duration: 15 minutes

F3 tornado
- on the Fujita scale
- Max width: 200 metres (219 yd)
- Path length: 10.0 km (6.2 mi)
- Highest winds: 158 to 206 mph (254 to 332 km/h)

Overall effects
- Casualties: None
- Areas affected: Oakville, Elm Creek, and Fannystelle, Manitoba, Canada

Significant damage to a line of shelterbelt trees following the Oakville tornado.

At approximately 6:55 p.m. CDT (23:55 UTC), as the Elie tornado was ongoing, a separate storm system produced a slender but intense tornado around 12 miles (19 km) to the west of Elie, south of the farming community of Oakville, Manitoba. This tornado took a winding path towards the southeast, exhibiting erratic, looping movements — similar to the Elie tornado. Throughout its short path, no injuries or deaths were reported, but the tornado caused sizable damage to vegetation, namely to trees and crops. Severe instances of structural damage were also noted, such as the collapse of a frame home near Oakville, an old farm house being "obliterated to its foundation", the destruction of multiple outbuildings (including a Quonset), and the destruction of grain bins and farm machinery at multiple farm sites.

Because the view to the Elie and Oakville tornadoes was unobstructed, multiple witnesses — specifically those along the Trans-Canada Highway — were able to see both tornadoes on the ground simultaneously, making for a rare event. Many photographs exist that show both the Elie and Oakville tornadoes from the same vantage point.

The Oakville tornado made contact with the ground at 6:55 p.m. CDT (2355 UTC), approximately 15.4 km (9.6 mi) south of the community of Oakville. From then, it proceeded to impact a series of farmsteads in rural areas south of the Trans-Canada Highway, causing considerable damage in the process. Several outbuildings were clipped or otherwise destroyed along the tornado's 10 km (6.2 mi) path, grain storage bins were reportedly crushed and thrown, and multiple farmsteads and frame homes suffered complete collapse. Per the Northern Tornadoes Project (2024), EC-PNR records indicated that the F3 rating of the Oakville tornado was based on the complete destruction and sweeping of an old farmhouse, with shearing and debarking of hardwood trees noted at the site. Sources also indicate that a quonset hut — a very common sight in rural southern Manitoba, mainly used for agricultural purposes — was destroyed, and heavy farm machinery was tossed and damaged. Witness photographs of the damage from the tornado also confirm that multiple wooden power lines were downed, a frame house collapsed in on itself with few interior walls remaining upright, and rows of shelterbelt trees were shredded, debarked, and occasionally sheared to ground level. Aerial imagery from after the tornado also shows the possible disappearance of vegetation around the affected areas.

It is suspected that the tornado dissipated shortly afterwards, at around 0010 UTC June 23 (7:10 p.m. CDT June 22) per radar imagery, though a specific dissipation time is not available. The tornado reached a maximum documented width of 200 meters (0.12 mi) and carved an erratic, winding path 10 km (6.2 mi) long through areas near Oakville and Fannystelle, Manitoba. The tornado caused no casualties due to its rural impact, but did cause significant structural and contextual damage. Based on the previously mentioned destruction of an old farmhouse, the tornado reached estimated winds up to 158-206 mph (254-332 km/h).

=== Westman tornado family ===
Westman tornado family
- Clockwise from top: The Pipestone supercell, prior to producing the Pipestone, Manitoba tornado, with a mesocyclone evident; the storm system that produced the Baldur tornado, as the tornado was in progress; a frame from a storm chasing video, showing the multi-vortex structure of the Pipestone tornado

Meteorological history
- Date: June 23, 2007

Tornado family
- Tornadoes: 4
- Max. rating: F3 tornado
- Highest winds: 158–206 mph (254–332 km/h) (Pipestone, Manitoba & Minto-Baldur, Manitoba F3 on June 23)

Overall effects
- Casualties: None
- Damage: Unknown
- Areas affected: Westman Region, Manitoba, Canada

Significant damage from the Baldur tornado.

In the evening hours of June 23, during the second day of the tornado outbreak sequence, at least one distinct, cyclic supercell tracked upwards of 83 km (52 mi) throughout the Westman region in Southern Manitoba. The conditions that produced this system resulted in a total of four tornadoes over at least 3 hours: the Oak Lake Reserve, Manitoba F1 tornado (0040 UTC), the Pipestone, Manitoba F3 tornado (0115 UTC), the Minto-Baldur, Manitoba F3 tornado (0210 UTC), and the Seven Sisters Falls, Manitoba F1 tornado (0400 UTC). None of the tornadoes from this system resulted in any confirmed injuries or deaths (though it is possible that the Pipestone and Baldur tornadoes resulted in injuries), but significant property and crop damage were reported.

Beginning at around 7:40 p.m. CDT, an F1 tornado moved in a southeasterly direction, striking the Oak Lake Reserve, which is home to the Canupawakpa Dakota First Nation. The tornado passed just north of Pipestone, and eventually dissipated east of town. Environment and Climate Change Canada (ECCC) records indicate that this tornado had a maximum width of 300 m (330 yd) and had a path length of 20 km (12 mi). The tornado was given a F1 rating, and it caused no injuries or deaths, mainly due to its rural location. Footage of the Oak Lake Reserve tornado exists online.

The system then produced a long-lived F3 tornado, which tracked approximately 60 km (37 mi) from Pipestone to Minto, Manitoba. This large "wedge" tornado had a maximum estimated width of 1,800 m (2,000 yd; 1.1 mi); several farmsteads were severely damaged or even destroyed, resulting in an F3 rating. At multiple points, the tornado exhibited a multi-vortex structure, which was made visible by the fact that the tornado's funnel was not fully condensed for much of its life.

The atmospheric conditions prior to the formation of the Pipestone tornado. Note extremely high CAPE, SRH, shear, and LR values, as well as the classic "sickle" shape of the hodograph, indicating rotation in the atmosphere.

The third tornado from this system, the Minto-Baldur, Manitoba tornado, formed at approximately 9:10 p.m. CDT. Similarly to the Pipestone tornado, the Baldur tornado was a large, long-tracked, and destructive "wedge" tornado that tracked southeast, having a maximum width of 800 m (870 yd; 0.50 mi) and a path length of 55 km (34 mi) per ECCC data. Several farmsteads were damaged or completely destroyed, and large swaths of trees were felled and even debarked. Reportedly, the tornado lofted multiple homes from their foundations completely and obliterated them. One such home was moved 150 yd (140 m) and was "demolished" after landing on its roof. Though the ECCC does not officially recognize any injuries from the tornado, sources report that three men were recovering from injuries after the tornado struck a trailer park north of Killarney.

Later into the evening, at around 11:00 p.m. local time, a brief tornado struck the Seven Sisters Falls area, in the Rural Municipality of Whitemouth. No casualties are attributed to this tornado, and the width, path length, and duration of this tornado are unknown.

== Impact and Aftermath ==
The Elie tornado remains the only tornado in Canadian history to receive the highest rating on either the Fujita scale (F5) or Enhanced Fujita scale (EF5); it is also the second-most-recent violent tornado in the province of Manitoba, the most recent being an EF4 tornado that impacted Alonsa and Silver Ridge in August of 2018. Several millions of dollars in damage were caused by this outbreak, with numerous areas, including Elie, Oakville, Pipestone, Hartney, and Killarney requiring extensive cleanup efforts and the assistance of local volunteers. Elie, which suffered damage to a flour mill and four frame homes on the town’s southwestern fringe, was quickly cleaned, and the swept homes were reconstructed. Several groups and institutions, including Manitoba's Emergency Management Organization (EMO) and Manitoba Hydro, participated in cleanup efforts. Representatives from the health and social service departments in Manitoba also worked throughout Southern Manitoba to restore losses and tend to victims. Though Environment and Climate Change Canada reports no injuries or deaths from this tornado outbreak, sources indicate that the Minto–Baldur tornado injured three in a trailer park, north of Killarney.

The Elie tornado is also notable from a technical standpoint. As the tornado was entering occlusion, it struck a frame residence equipped with properly-spaced J-bolts, 2x6 sill plates, and larger-than-typical washers. This home suffered a vertical failure and was launched 75 ft (23 m) into the air, where it then disintegrated as it was rotated around the tornado. Initially, the Elie tornado was rated F4, as surveyors were concerned that the slow movement of the tornado may have allowed it to "relentlessly pound" the home into failing. However, when a video surfaced showing that the failure was instantaneous, ECCC surveyors upgraded the tornado to F5. Surveyors also mentioned that the Elie tornado would have qualified for an EF5 rating, had the Enhanced Fujita scale been in use in Canada at the time.

== See also ==
- Tornadoes of 2007
- List of North American tornadoes and tornado outbreaks
  - List of Canadian tornadoes and tornado outbreaks (2000–present)
