= Manitoba Provincial Road 227 =

Provincial road in Manitoba, Canada

Provincial Road 227
- PR 200 highlighted in red

Route information
- Maintained by Manitoba Infrastructure
- Length: 72.0 km (44.7 mi)
- Existed: 1966–present

Major junctions
- West end: PTH 16 (TCH) / YH near Westbourne
- East end: PTH 6 in Warren

Location
- Country: Canada
- Province: Manitoba
- Rural municipalities: Portage la Prairie; Woodlands

Highway system
- Provincial highways in Manitoba; Winnipeg City Routes
← PR 225	→ PR 229

Provincial Road 227 (PR 227) is a provincial road in the Canadian province of Manitoba. It runs south of Lake Manitoba from the Yellowhead Highway (PTH 16) to PTH 6.

PR 227 is a well-travelled gravel road, used to access the many cottages located near Lake Manitoba and sometimes as a shorter alternative to the Trans-Canada Highway by those travelling between the Yellowhead and south Interlake region. High water levels on Lake Manitoba in recent years have made certain portions of the road prone to flooding. On 30 August 2022, the Manitoba government announced it is "committing almost $70 million for upgrades to Provincial Road (PR) 227".

== Major intersections ==
Division	Location	km	mi	Destinations	Notes
Portage la Prairie		0.0	0.0	PTH 16 (TCH) / YH – Portage la Prairie, Neepawa	Western terminus
Portage la Prairie		11.5– 11.7	7.1– 7.3	Bridge over the Portage Diversion	
Portage la Prairie	Oakland	16.8	10.4	PR 240 north – Delta Beach	Western end of PR 240 concurrency (overlap); western end of paved section
Portage la Prairie		18.5	11.5	PR 240 south – Portage la Prairie	Eastern end of PR 240 concurrency; eastern end of paved section
Portage la Prairie		39.0	24.2	PR 430 – St. Ambrosie, Oakville, St. Ambroise Provincial Park	
Woodlands	Meadow Lea	58.7	36.5	PR 248 – Marquette, Lake Francis	Western end of paved section
Woodlands	Warren	72.0	44.7	PTH 6 – Winnipeg, Ashern	Eastern terminus; eastern end of paved section; road formerly continued into Warren as Hanlan Street prior to its closure
1.000 mi = 1.609 km; 1.000 km = 0.621 mi: Concurrency terminus
