= Homewood, Manitoba =

Homewood
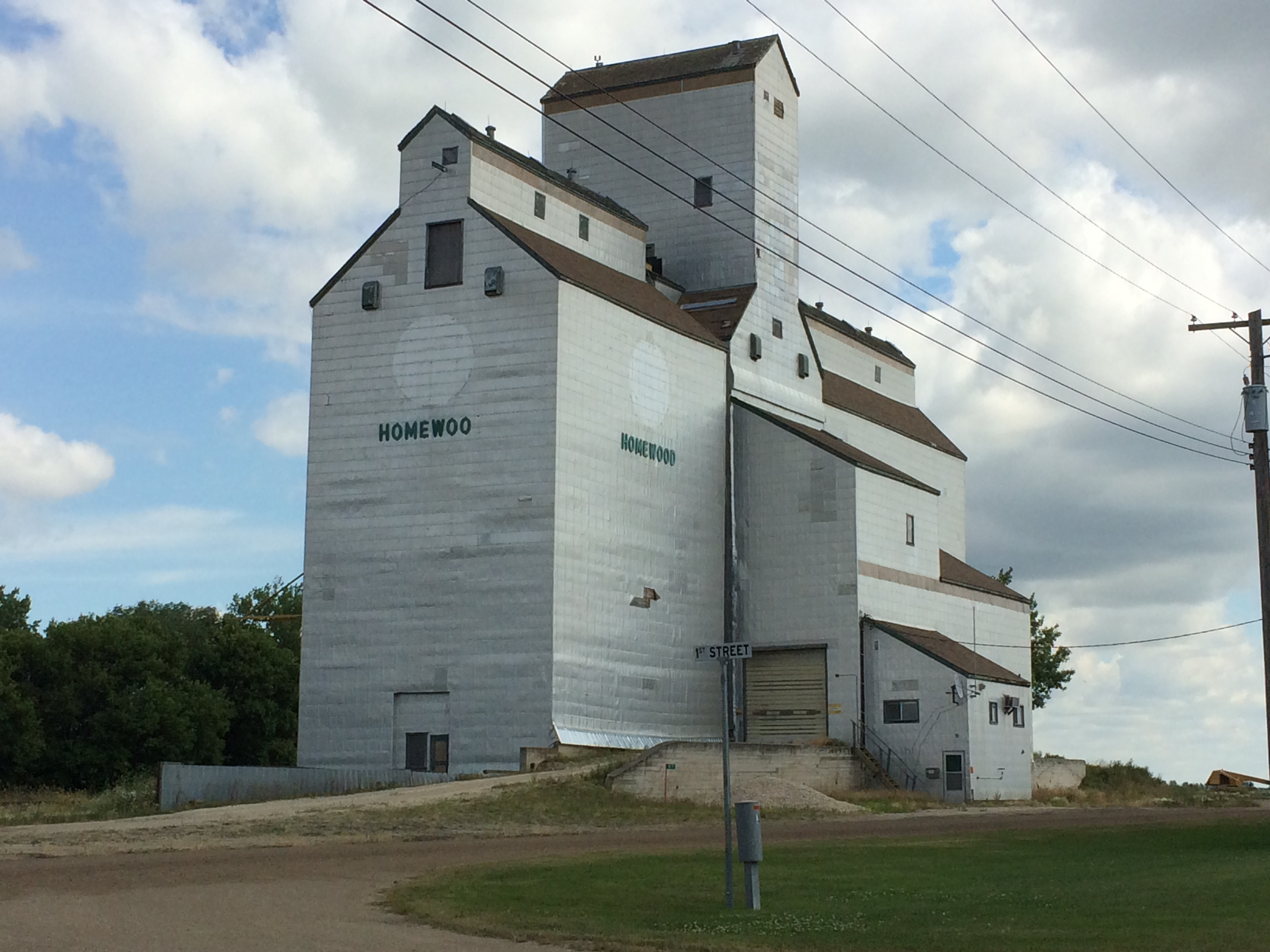
- Grain Elevator at Homewood (Demolished in August, 2021)

- Location of Homewood in Manitoba
- Coordinates: 49°30′31″N 97°51′51″W
- Country: Canada
- Province: Manitoba
- Region: Pembina Valley
- Census Division: No. 3

Government
  - Governing Body: Rural Municipality of Dufferin Council
  - MP: Branden Leslie
  - MLA: Lauren Stone
- Time zone: UTC−6 (CST)
  - Summer (DST): UTC−5 (CDT)
- Postal Code: R0G 0Y0
- Area code: 204
- NTS Map: 062H12
- GNBC Code: GALBD

Homewood is an unincorporated community in south central Manitoba, Canada. It is located approximately 10 kilometers (6 miles) east of Carman, Manitoba in the Rural Municipality of Dufferin. The privately owned and operated Homewood Airport is located near the community.
