= 2007 Elie tornado =

F5 tornado in Manitoba, Canada

Coordinates: 49.901°N 97.758°W

- The tornado approaching the town of Elie, Manitoba, around 6:50 p.m. CDT

Meteorological history
- Formed: June 22, 2007, 6:25 p.m. CDT (UTC–05:00)
- Dissipated: June 22, 2007, 7:00 p.m. CDT (UTC–05:00)
- Duration: 35 minutes

F5 tornado
- on the Fujita scale
- Highest winds: >261 mph (420 km/h)

Overall effects
- Casualties: None
- Damage: $57.88 million CAD (As of September 2026; adjusted for inflation)
- Areas affected: Elie, Manitoba, Canada
- Part of the 2007 Southern Manitoba tornado outbreak and Tornadoes of 2007

The 2007 Elie tornado was a small, but extremely powerful and erratic tornado that occurred in Manitoba, Canada, during the evening hours of Friday, June 22, 2007. The powerful F5 tornado that struck the town of Elie (40 km (25 mi) west of Winnipeg) is known for its unusual path, behaviour, its rope to cone structure (as opposed to a "wedge" structure), and how unique it is compared to other F5/EF5 tornadoes. It was part of a small two-day tornado outbreak that occurred in the southern Manitoba region, which featured other significant (F2+) tornadoes. The tornado reached a maximum width of 150 yards (140 m) and had a path length of about 6 km (3.7 mi). It was unusual because it caused extreme damage during its "roping-out" stage at a mere 35 yards (32 m) in width, all while moving extremely slowly and unpredictably. The tornado tracked primarily southeast, as opposed to the usual northeasterly motion of tornadoes, and it made multiple loops and sharp turns.

While several houses were leveled, no one was injured or killed by the tornado. A well-built, anchored home in Elie was swept off of its foundation, with the entire house being lofted by the tornado and disintegrated midair, justifying an F5 rating. One of the strongest tornadoes in the modern era, it is one of only eleven to be rated F5/EF5 since the 1999 Bridge Creek-Moore tornado. Damage costs were estimated at $39 million ($57.88 million in 2026).

As of 2026, this is the most recent tornado to be rated F5 on the Fujita Scale, before the introduction of the Enhanced Fujita Scale as the United States had switched to using the Enhanced Fujita Scale earlier that year, followed by Canada in 2013.

== Meteorological synopsis ==
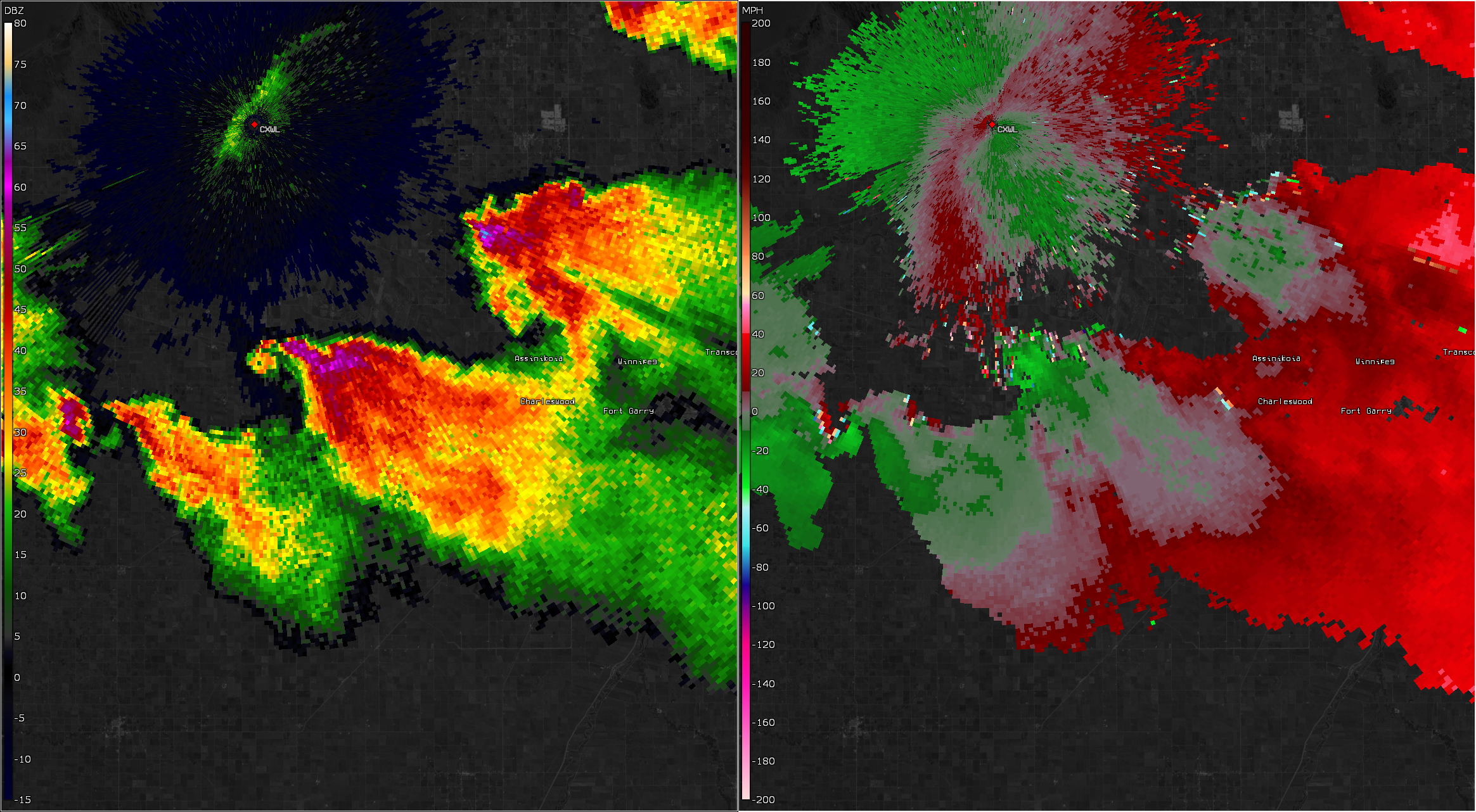
Elie Tornado Radar CXWL scan as it hit the town of Elie

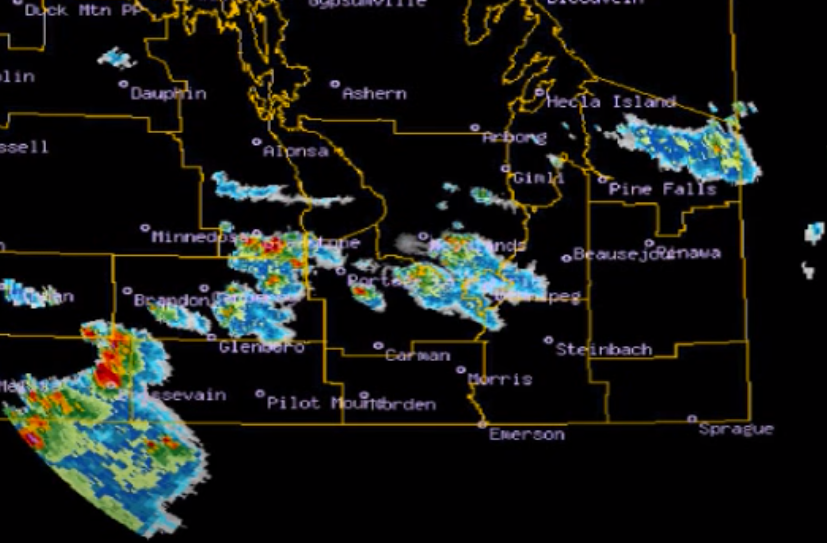
Radar image of the group of storms that produced the tornado

Prior to the event, 1200 UTC 500-mb mesoscale analysis revealed the presence of a building upper ridge over the southern Prairies region of Canada, specifically in the southern Alberta and Saskatchewan regions, with a minor shortwave trough accompanying this ridge over Alberta. A thermal ridge was also noted in the southern Saskatchewan area, preventing storm formation and increasing heating in the upper atmosphere. Winds contained within a jet max at 800 hPa reached 10-15 m s⁻¹ (22-34 mph) as they rounded the western half of a high pressure ridge situated over the High Plains. This intense jet stream continually advected moisture from the Gulf of Mexico, allowing any developing storms to have access to large amounts of inflow. The directional and magnitudinal change of wind with height, known as wind shear, was also observed during this time, further contributing to an environment favorable for storm development.

At the surface, multiple disconnected lows were present, with one surface low over southern Saskatchewan featuring a warm front that extended to the east, into the Interlake region of the province of Manitoba. Due to this low, warm temperatures and high dew point values were advected into the region, increasing instability in the atmosphere. By 1800 UTC, this surface low had moved east and positioned itself directly over Dauphin Lake, with surrounding temperatures reaching 26-28°C (79-82°F), and dew points skyrocketing to 18-20°C (64-68°F). At this time, a significant elevated mixed layer (EML) remained over the area, preventing convection and storm activity but allowing for instability to continue to rise. By 2100 UTC, the area of low pressure had finally migrated to the southern basin of Lake Manitoba, and remained quasi-stationary for hours, with the Elie tornado initiating off of a dry line ahead of a cold front that extended from the low. It is noted that a cold pool and gravity waves may have affected the development of the Elie tornado, as well as other tornadoes in the surrounding area.

== Tornado summary ==
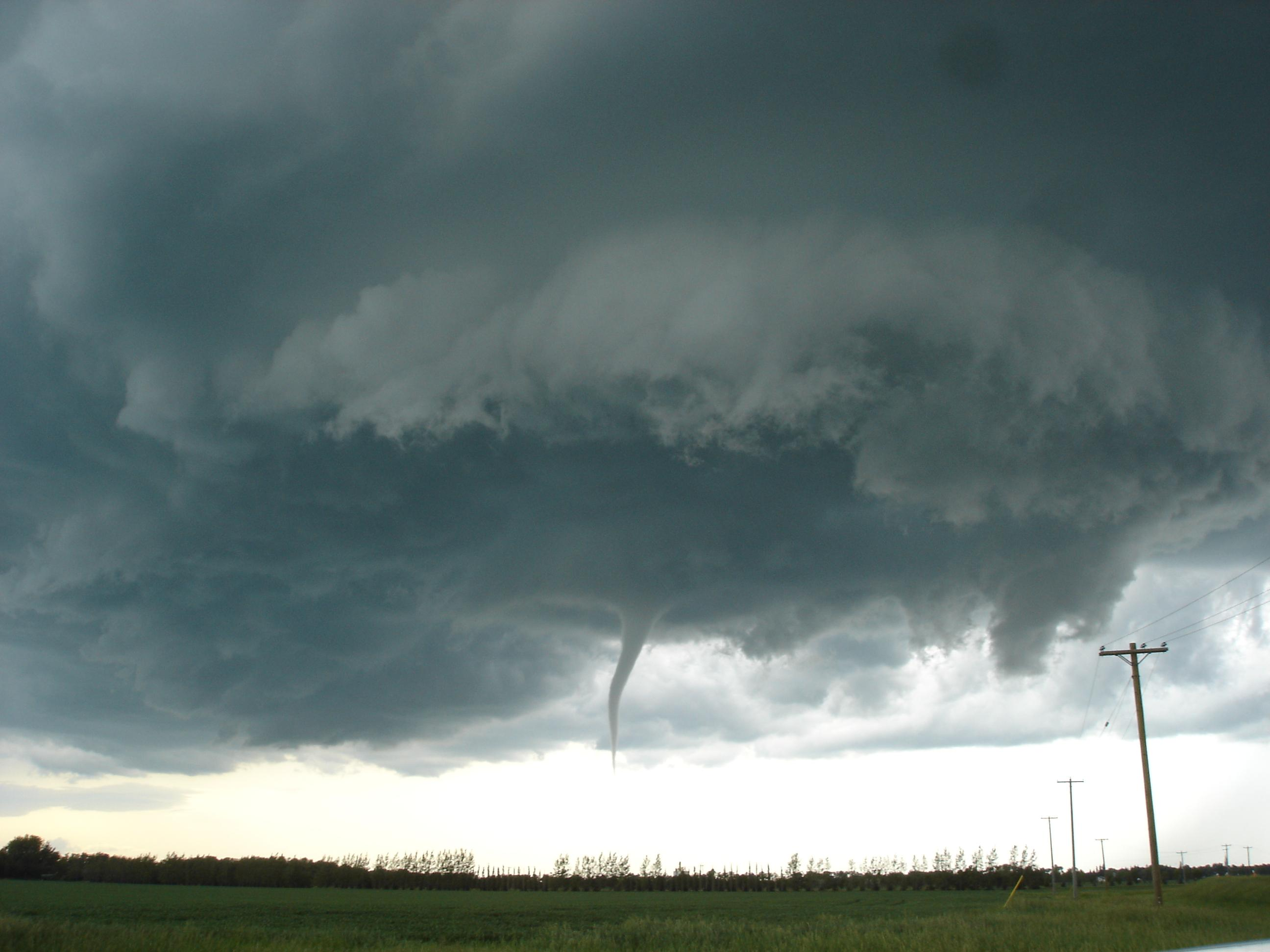
Funnel cloud that would produce the Elie tornado

The tornado initially touched down north of the Trans-Canada Highway at around 6:25 p.m. CDT (23:25 UTC) and slowly moved southeast, where it picked up and overturned a semi-trailer and a tractor trailer. The tornado gradually turned east, took a sharp turn south, and then took another sharp turn east, all within roughly 1 mile (1.6 km). The tornado made another turn south and made an extremely slow loop over the town's flour mill at F2 intensity, causing over $1 million in damage. Multiple semi trucks were overturned and damaged and building walls buckled inward. At this point, the tornado was producing F1 to F2 level damage and had grown to a width of 50 m (55 yd). From there, it headed south parallel to Janzen Road at F0 intensity. It also continued to grow in width, reaching its peak width of about 140 m (153 yd). After reaching the intersection of Janzen Road and Road 61 North, the tornado turned east directly towards the southwest edge of Elie. It quickly intensified to F4 strength while it made a loop over Elie Street, as it began to severely damage multiple homes along this street. One of these homes, which was described as well-built and bolted to its foundation, was completely removed from its foundation and lofted into the air by the tornado, where it then collapsed into pieces as it was thrown around the tornado's funnel, justifying F5 intensity. The tornado also sheared some sill plates from this home and snapped off the bolts that supported these sill plates. Trees were debarked as well. Two other houses sustained F4 level damage, with both of them being almost completely swept from their foundations. One other house to the west also sustained F2-F3 level damage, with the entire roof torn off and multiple exterior walls collapsed. The tornado also flipped and threw multiple cars, including a car that was tossed over 100 meters, and even tossed one homeowner's Chrysler Fifth Avenue onto a neighbor's roof. The tornado lingered over this area of Elie for approximately four minutes before it exited Elie to the southwest and rapidly dissipated.

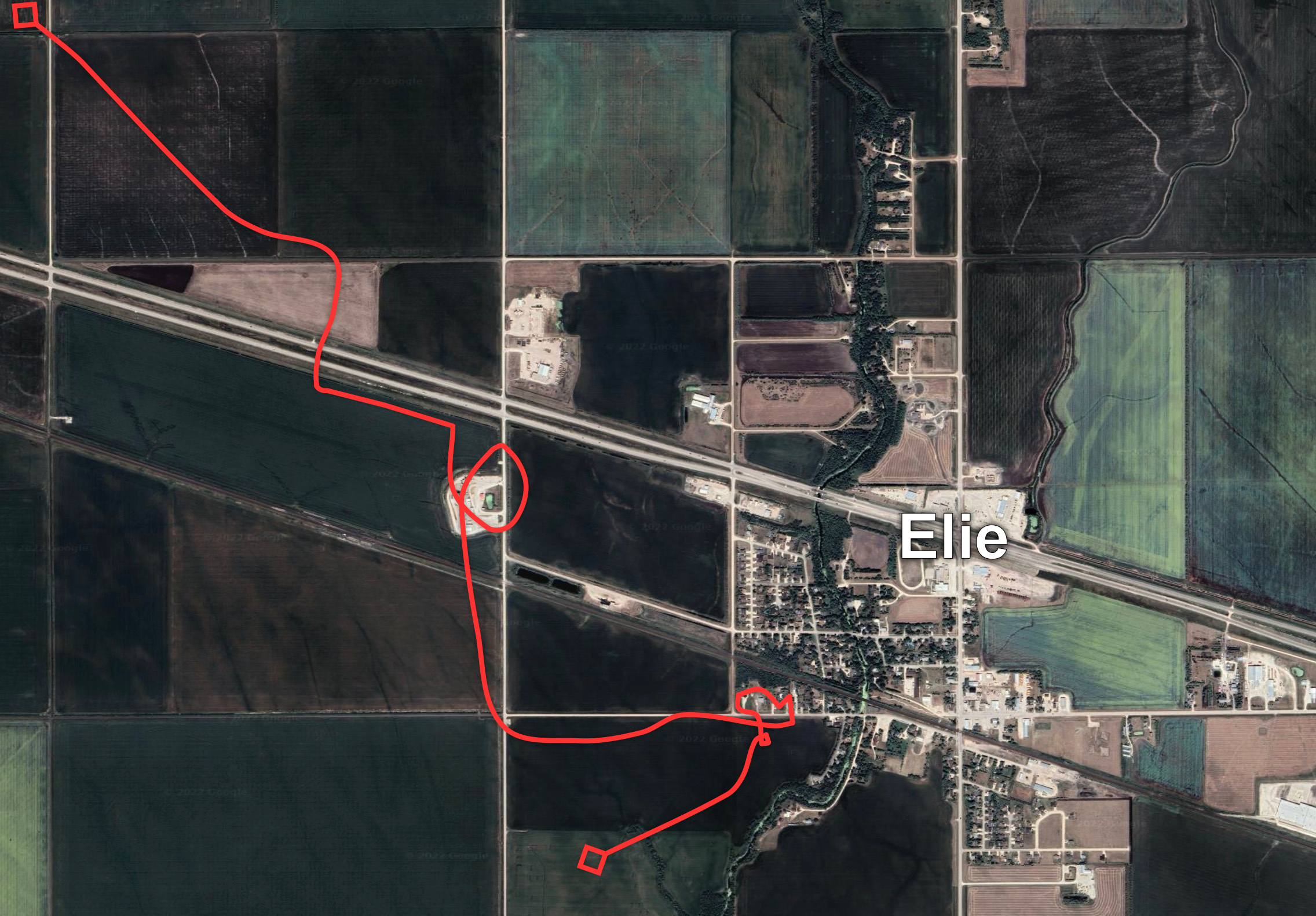
Path of the tornado, showing sporadic loops and turns

The tornado traveled about 6 km (3.7 mi) and was 150 yards (140 m) wide at its widest during its 35-minute lifespan. The tornado repeatedly struck the same area of town, destroying most of the structures and vehicles in the area. A video of the tornado shows an entire two-story home being wiped off of its foundation and tossed 75 feet (23 m) in the air, before rotating around the tornado and then being destroyed. Also seen on the video was a three-quarters-of-a-ton (1,500 LB) GM van filled with drywall that was lofted by the tornado and tossed hundreds of feet. At least three houses are seen being destroyed on the video, along with many more structures and vehicles being damaged. In other videos, the flour mill in Elie is also shown being damaged by the tornado, with bins and roofs being destroyed.

== Aftermath ==
F5 damage to a well built home in Elie

Since residents in Elie were prepared and took the necessary precautions during the event, there were no injuries or deaths reported. The following day, Environment Canada sent out a storm damage survey team from the Prairie and Arctic Storm Prediction Centre to assess the damage caused by the tornado. On September 18, 2007, the tornado was upgraded to F5 on the Fujita scale from the original F4 rating based on video analysis of the tornado and reassessment of the damage. This was the first tornado in Canada to be officially rated as such, making it the strongest confirmed tornado in Canadian history. It was one of only two F5/EF5 tornadoes that year (the other being a large and destructive EF5 tornado that struck Greensburg, Kansas on May 4), and it is one of only eleven tornadoes to be rated F5/EF5 since the 1999 Bridge Creek-Moore tornado. At the time, Canada had not adopted the Enhanced Fujita scale, which explains why the tornado received an F5 rating despite happening after the release of the Enhanced Fujita scale in the United States. It was mentioned by surveyors, however, that the Elie tornado was an EF5-equivalent tornado and could have received an EF5 rating if the enhanced scale were in use in Canada at the time.

=== F4 vs F5 rating ===
In 2008, at the American Meteorological Society's 24th Conference on Severe Local Storms, Patrick J. McCarthy, along with D. Carlsen and J. Slipec, submitted a paper for and hosted a presentation on the Elie tornado. At the conference, it was discussed that some of the damage did point to an F5 rating. However, the survey team was concerned that the tornado was weaker than F5 strength, and only caused the extreme damage due to moving slowly, where it could have "relentlessly pounded the houses into a higher level of destruction". After further investigation using video evidence captured by those watching the tornado, the surveyors determined that, "The structural failures were quick. The structural assessments indicated that the homes were well-built and generally well-secured." In particular, one of the destroyed homes met all of the requirements for the highest damage rating," being equipped with 2x6 sill plates, larger-than-usual washers, and J-bolts.

=== Significance ===
The Elie tornado was also significant due to its appearance at F5 intensity, where it was reaching the end of its life span and was in its "roping-out"/decaying stage. Some meteorologists suggest that the extreme intensity of the tornado was a result of the rapid implosion of the tornado's wind field, which caused it to quickly accelerate for a brief period of time. This theory aligns with the physical principle of conservation of angular momentum, where a constricted radius results in acceleration. This is similar to a figure skater pulling in his or her arms to spin more quickly.

== See also ==
- 2007 Southern Manitoba tornado outbreak
- Tornadoes of 2007
- List of Canadian tornadoes and tornado outbreaks (since 2001)
- List of F5, EF5, and IF5 tornadoes
- 1997 Jarrell tornado – Another slow-moving, erratic, and extremely intense tornado that impacted the town of Jarrell, Texas in May 1997
- List of notable media in the field of meteorology
