= Patrick Fischer =

Swiss ice hockey player and coach (born 1975)

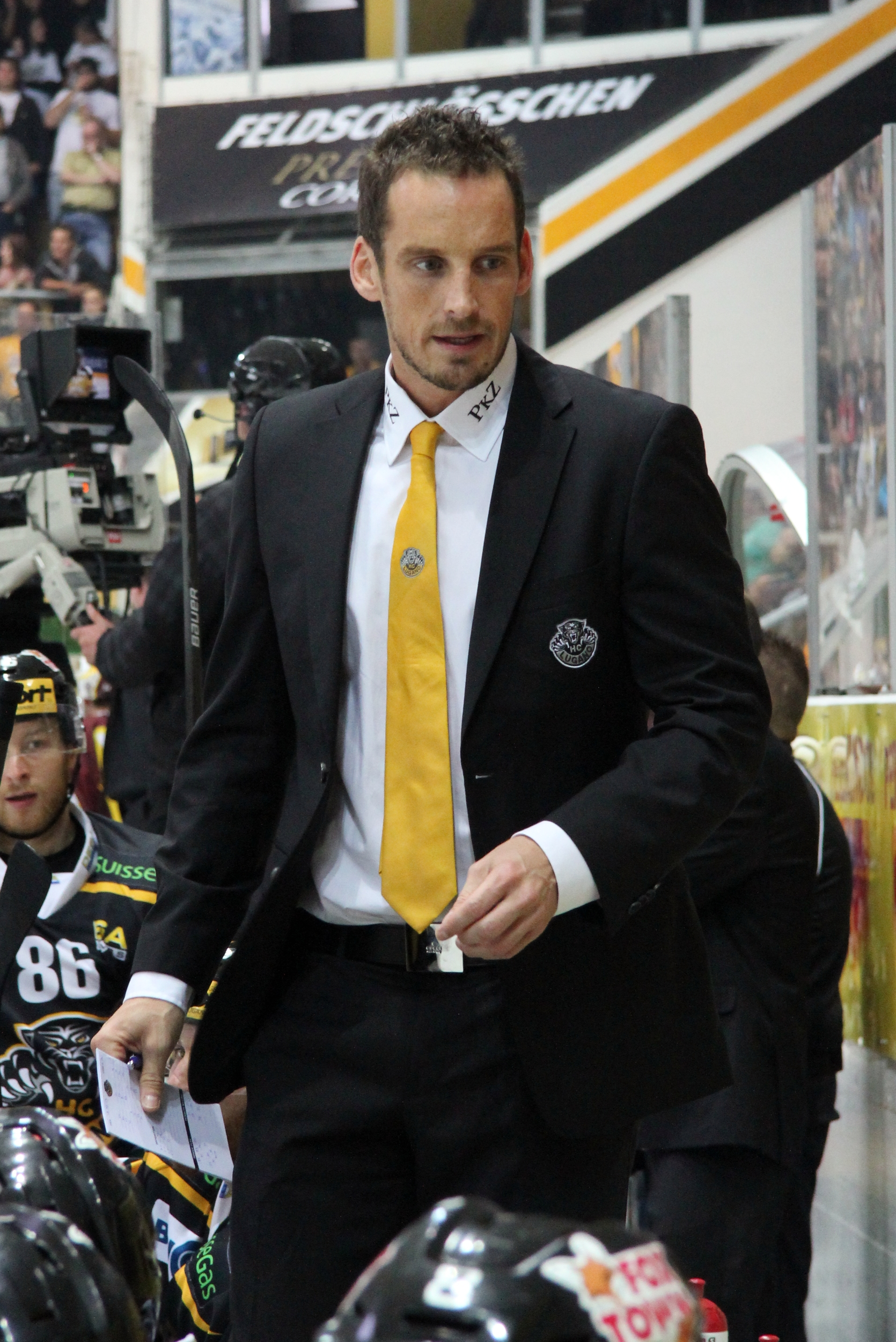
- Fischer in 2014
- Born: September 6, 1975 (age 50) Zug, Switzerland
- Height: 5 ft 11 in (180 cm)
- Weight: 194 lb (88 kg; 13 st 12 lb)
- Position: Centre
- Shot: Left
- Played for: EV Zug; HC Lugano; HC Davos; Arizona Coyotes; SKA Saint Petersburg
- National team: Switzerland
- NHL draft: Undrafted
- Playing career: 1992–2009

Patrick Fischer (born September 6, 1975) is a Swiss ice hockey coach and former professional ice hockey forward who played briefly in the National Hockey League (NHL) with the Arizona Coyotes. He predominantly played in his native country in the National League A. He was the head coach of the Swiss national team from 2016 to 2026.

== Playing career ==
Fischer made his professional debut at EV Zug of the Swiss National League A (NLA) during the 1992–93 season. He transferred to fellow NLA side HC Lugano in 1997 and won the Swiss championship with the club in 1999. After two years with Lugano, Fischer moved on to HC Davos, where he played until the end of the 2002–03 campaign. During his Davos stint, he won a Swiss championship in 2002 as well as the Spengler Cup in 2000.

He joined back EV Zug in 2003 and then in 2006–07 took his game to the NHL, joining the Arizona Coyotes. He appeared in his first NHL game on October 5, 2006, against the New York Islanders and played a total of 27 games for the Coyotes. After a short stint at SKA St. Petersburg of the Kontinental Hockey League (KHL) at the beginning of the 2007–08 campaign, Fischer returned to Zug. He retired on May 8, 2009, from professional ice hockey. He was named to EV Zug's Wall of Fame and had his jersey number 21 retired by the club.

Fischer won a total of 183 caps for the Swiss national team and played in the 2002 and 2006 Olympic Games as well as in several World Championships.

== Coaching career ==
He started his coaching career in the youth ranks of HC Lugano and was named assistant coach of the club's NLA team in 2010. He briefly took over as interim head coach in October 2011 after the sacking of Barry Smith. In 2013, he was named Lugano head coach and was relieved of his duties in October 2015 after collecting only 16 points from the 15 opening games of the 2015–16 season.

Serving as assistant coach to Sean Simpson, Fischer helped the Swiss national team win the silver medal at the 2013 World Championships, and also joined the coaching staff for the 2014 World Championships.

In December 2015, he was named head coach of the Swiss national team. He was dismissed in April 2026.

== Career statistics ==
=== Regular season and playoffs ===
			Regular season					Playoffs
Season	Team	League	GP	G	A	Pts	PIM	GP	G	A	Pts	PIM
1991–92	Carman Collegiate	HSMB	—	—	—	—	—	—	—	—	—	—
1992–93	EV Zug	SUI U20	29	17	18	35	—	3	2	0	2	—
1992–93	EV Zug	NDA	2	0	0	0	0	—	—	—	—	—
1993–94	EV Zug	SUI U20	18	12	15	27	—	5	5	2	7	—
1993–94	EV Zug	NDA	32	1	6	7	14	9	0	2	2	26
1994–95	EV Zug	SUI U20	3	5	4	9	6	1	2	0	2	—
1994–95	EV Zug	NDA	36	10	18	28	30	12	2	4	6	4
1995–96	EV Zug	SUI U20	1	1	0	1	—	—	—	—	—	—
1995–96	EV Zug	NDA	36	10	17	27	24	9	0	2	2	16
1996–97	EV Zug	NDA	43	20	18	38	26	10	0	1	1	0
1997–98	HC Lugano	NDA	40	15	28	43	38	7	0	5	5	6
1998–99	HC Lugano	NDA	45	11	17	28	73	16	3	0	3	10
1999–00	HC Davos	NLA	44	19	17	36	107	5	2	2	4	0
2000–01	HC Davos	NLA	42	13	27	40	54	—	—	—	—	—
2001–02	HC Davos	NLA	38	8	22	30	36	16	5	6	11	39
2002–03	HC Davos	NLA	44	17	21	38	87	16	2	7	9	43
2003–04	EV Zug	NLA	46	12	23	35	70	5	1	4	5	0
2004–05	EV Zug	NLA	44	17	18	35	64	9	2	5	7	12
2005–06	EV Zug	NLA	44	21	32	53	72	7	2	4	6	24
2006–07	San Antonio Rampage	AHL	4	0	1	1	6	—	—	—	—	—
2006–07	Phoenix Coyotes	NHL	27	4	6	10	24	—	—	—	—	—
2007–08	SKA Saint Petersburg	RSL	5	0	1	1	22	—	—	—	—	—
2007–08	EV Zug	NLA	32	10	11	21	2	7	3	3	6	10
2008–09	EV Zug	NLA	50	19	27	46	70	10	0	5	5	22
NLA totals			618	203	302	505	827	138	22	50	72	212
NHL totals			27	4	6	10	24	—	—	—	—	—

=== International ===
Year	Team	Event	GP	G	A	Pts	PIM
1993	Switzerland	EJC B	7	5	4	9	0
1994	Switzerland	WJC	7	1	0	1	8
1995	Switzerland	WJC B	7	4	2	6	12
1996	Switzerland	WC B	7	3	3	6	4
1997	Switzerland	OGQ	4	1	0	1	2
1998	Switzerland	WC	8	1	2	3	4
1999	Switzerland	WC	6	4	0	4	6
2000	Switzerland	WC	7	3	2	5	8
2002	Switzerland	OG	4	1	0	1	4
2003	Switzerland	WC	7	2	2	4	8
2004	Switzerland	WC	7	1	0	1	8
2005	Switzerland	OGQ	3	1	0	1	2
2005	Switzerland	WC	7	2	2	4	2
2006	Switzerland	OG	6	1	1	2	4
Junior totals			21	10	6	16	20
Senior totals			66	20	12	32	52
