= Barnsley, Manitoba =

Barnsley
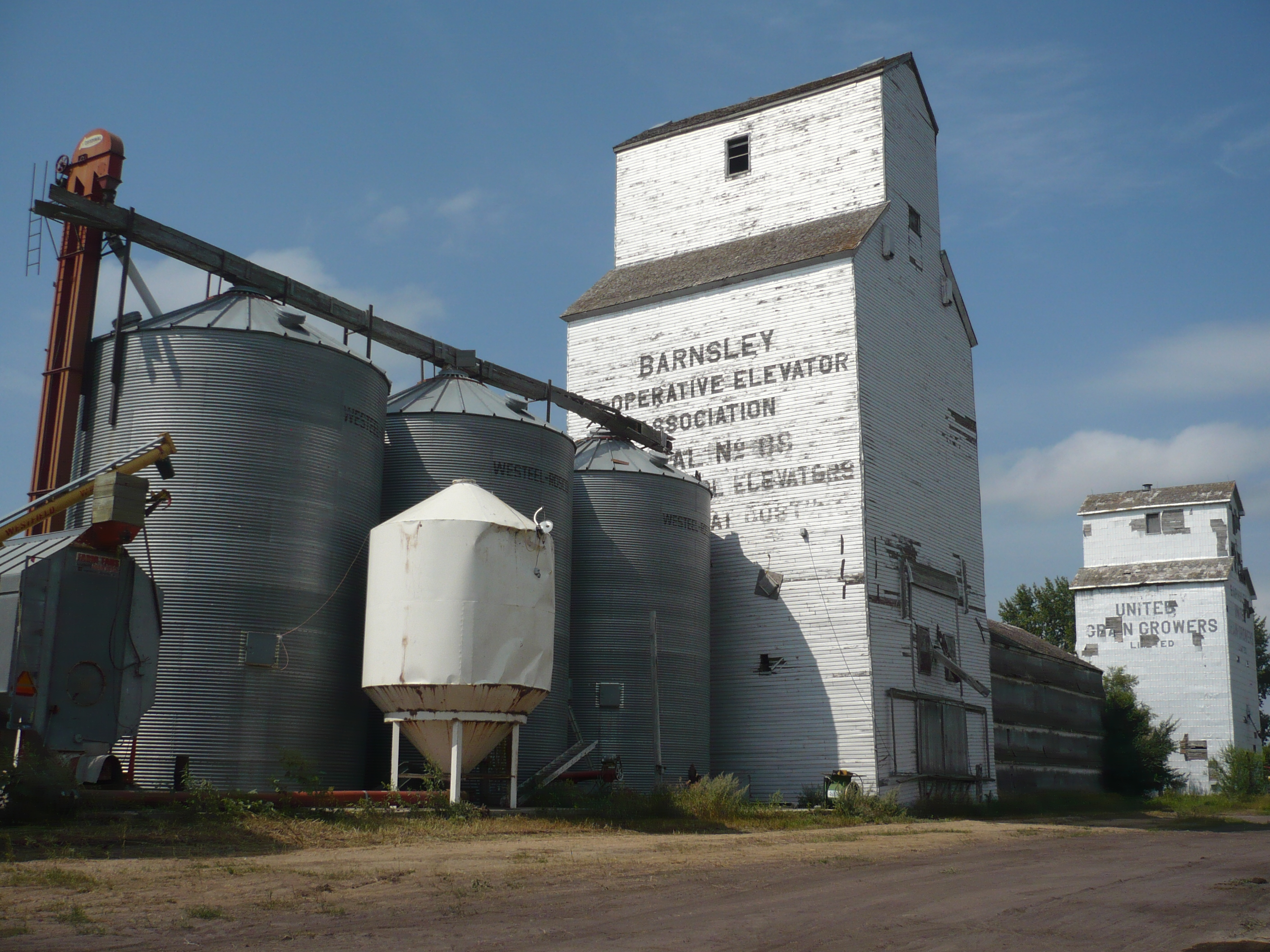
- Manitoba Co-operative Elevator Association and United Grain Growers Elevators at Barnsley

- Location of Barnsley in Manitoba
- Coordinates: 49°35′31″N 97°59′24″W
- Country: Canada
- Province: Manitoba
- Region: Pembina Valley
- Census Division: No. 3

Government
  - Governing Body: Rural Municipality of Dufferin Council
  - MP: Branden Leslie
  - MLA: Lauren Stone
- Time zone: UTC−6 (CST)
  - Summer (DST): UTC−5 (CDT)
- Area code: 204
- NTS Map: 062H12
- GNBC Code: GABRE

Barnsley is a locality in south central Manitoba, Canada. It is located approximately 10 kilometers (6 miles) north of Carman, Manitoba in the Rural Municipality of Dufferin.
