= Manitoba Provincial Road 331 =

Provincial road in Manitoba, Canada

Provincial Road 331
- PR 331 highlighted in red

Route information
- Maintained by Department of Infrastructure
- Length: 19.2 km (11.9 mi)
- Existed: 1966–present

Major junctions
- West end: PR 240 near Portage la Prairie
- East end: PTH 13 at Oakville

Location
- Country: Canada
- Province: Manitoba
- Rural municipalities: Portage la Prairie

Highway system
- Provincial highways in Manitoba; Winnipeg City Routes
← PR 330	→ PR 332

Provincial Road 331 (PR 331) is an east-west provincial road in the Central Plains Region of the Canadian province of Manitoba, connecting the city of Portage la Prairie and the town of Oakville via Newton.

== Route description ==
The route begins at PR 240 south of Portage la Prairie, and terminates at PTH 13 in Oakville.

PR 331 is mainly a straight east-west road, with one major winding section known as Hoop and Holler Bend. This stretch of road skirts the southern banks of the Assiniboine River at around the midway point of the route. Hoop and Holler Bend was used as a controlled breach in the midst of a major flood in the spring of 2011.

PR 331 is paved for its entire length.

== History ==
In the early 1990s, the Manitoba government decommissioned a number of provincial secondary roads and returned the maintenance of these roads back to the rural municipalities. A portion of PR 331 was included in this decommissioning.

Prior to this, PR 331 extended past its current eastbound terminus with PTH 13 for another 8 kilometres (5.0 mi) before terminating at the Trans-Canada Highway near the unincorporated community of Fortier. The highway would make a very sharp turn to the left just before its original eastern terminus to allow a more uniform junction with the two highways, and thus reduce the number of collisions at that intersection.

The decommissioned section of PR 331 is now maintained by the Rural Municipality of Portage la Prairie. The original length of PR 331 was 27.5 kilometres (17.1 mi).

== Major intersections ==
Division	Location	km	mi	Destinations	Notes
Portage la Prairie		0.0	0.0	PR 240 – St. Claude, Portage la Prairie; Centennaire Drive – Southport, Portage la Prairie/Southport Airport	Western terminus; road continues west as PR 240 southbound
Portage la Prairie		9.3	5.8	Salem School Road (Road 30W) – Haywood, Curtis	Former PR 338 south
Portage la Prairie	Oakville	19.2	11.9	PTH 13 – Poplar Point, Elm Creek; 3rd Avenue – Oakville, Fortier	Eastern terminus; road continues east as 3rd Avenue (former PR 331 east)
1.000 mi = 1.609 km; 1.000 km = 0.621 mi
