= Roseisle, Manitoba =

Roseisle
- Location of Roseisle in Manitoba
- Coordinates: 49°30′0″N 98°20′39″W
- Country: Canada
- Province: Manitoba
- Region: Pembina Valley
- Census Division: No. 3

Government
  - Governing Body: Rural Municipality of Dufferin Council
  - MP: Branden Leslie
  - MLA: Lauren Stone
- Time zone: UTC−6 (CST)
  - Summer (DST): UTC−5 (CDT)
- Postal Code: R0G 1V0
- Area codes: 204, 431
- NTS Map: 062G08
- GNBC Code: GAXMO

Roseisle is an unincorporated community in south central Manitoba, Canada. It is located approximately 96 kilometres (60 miles) southwest of Winnipeg in the Rural Municipality of Dufferin.
