= Carman Collegiate =

Coordinates: 49.5026°N 97.9950°W

- Carman, Manitoba; Canada

Information
- School type: Secondary school
- Founded: 1964
- School board: Prairie Rose School Division
- Principal: Mary Reimer
- Grades: 6–12
- Enrolment: 425
- Language: English
- Mascot: Cougar
- Team name: Carman Cougars

Carman Collegiate is a public secondary school in Carman, Manitoba, Canada. Founded in 1964, the school serves students in Grades 6 through 12 and is operated by the Prairie Rose School Division. The school enrols approximately 425 students. The principal is Mary Reimer.
