= Macdonald, Manitoba =

Coordinates: 50.057°N 98.468°W

Macdonald is an unincorporated community in Manitoba northwest of Portage la Prairie. The Post Office opened in 1884 on section 33, township 12, range 8 west of the Prime Meridian. Originally known as Drumconner, it changed to its present name in 1895 (commemorating Sir John A. Macdonald, first Prime Minister of Canada) and is located on section 35, township 8, range 12 west of the Prime Meridian. The community is in the Rural Municipality of Portage la Prairie.

The community is mostly agricultural, with a small residential area along Main Street/Centre Street and Cream Street.

== Transportation ==
PTH 16 (Yellowhead Highway) is the main roadway connecting Macdonald with Portage la Prairie.

Canadian Pacific Railway has one track passing through Macdonald.
