= Division No. 3, Manitoba =

Census division in Canada

Coordinates: 49°17′N 97°54′W

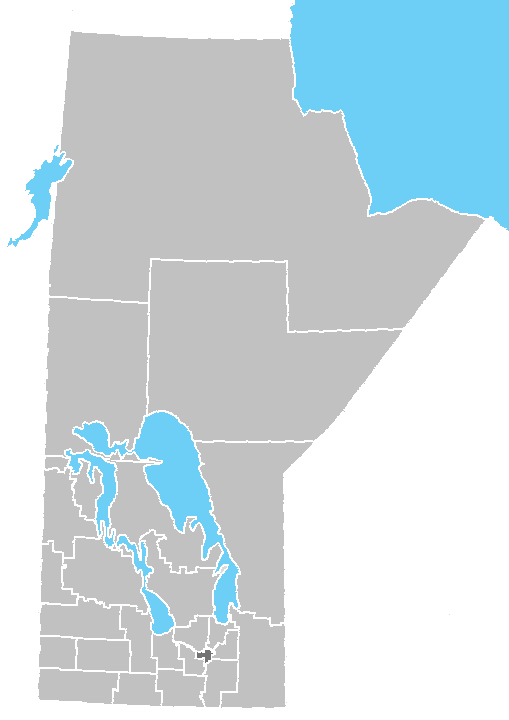

Division No. 3 is a census division located within the Pembina Valley Region in the south-central region of the province of Manitoba, Canada. Unlike in some other provinces, census divisions do not reflect the organization of local government in Manitoba. These areas exist solely for the purposes of statistical analysis and presentation; they have no government of their own.

Its major service centre is the city of Winkler. Other important towns include Morden, Altona, and Carman. The major industry of the Pembina Valley is agriculture.

== Demographics ==
In the 2021 Census of Population conducted by Statistics Canada, Division No. 3 had a population of 57,363 living in 19,933 of its 20,814 total private dwellings, a change of 4.7% from its 2016 population of 54,796. With a land area of 5,285.65 km^{2} (2,040.80 sq mi), it had a population density of 10.9/km^{2} (28.1/sq mi) in 2021.

== Cities ==
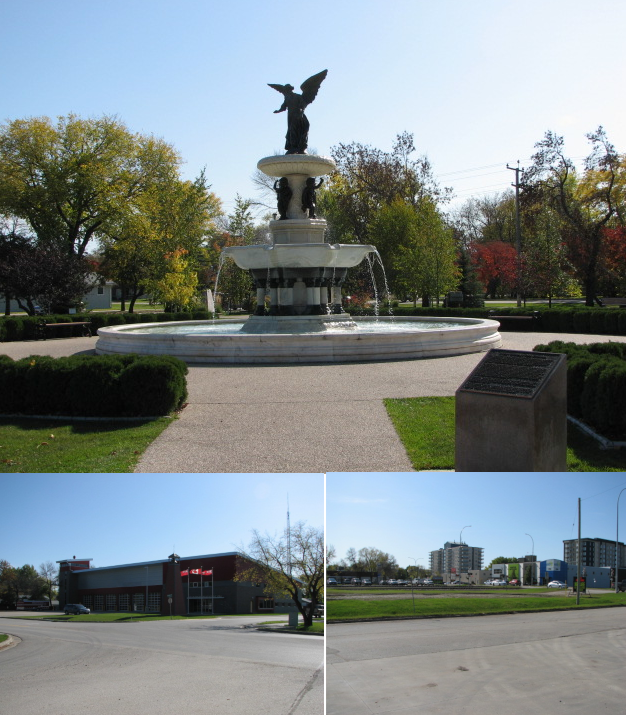
Winkler

- Winkler
- Morden

== Towns ==
- Altona
- Carman
- Morris

== Rural municipalities ==
- Dufferin
- Emerson – Franklin (part in Division No. 2)
- Montcalm
- Morris
- Rhineland
- Roland
- Stanley
- Thompson
