= Elie, Manitoba =

Elie
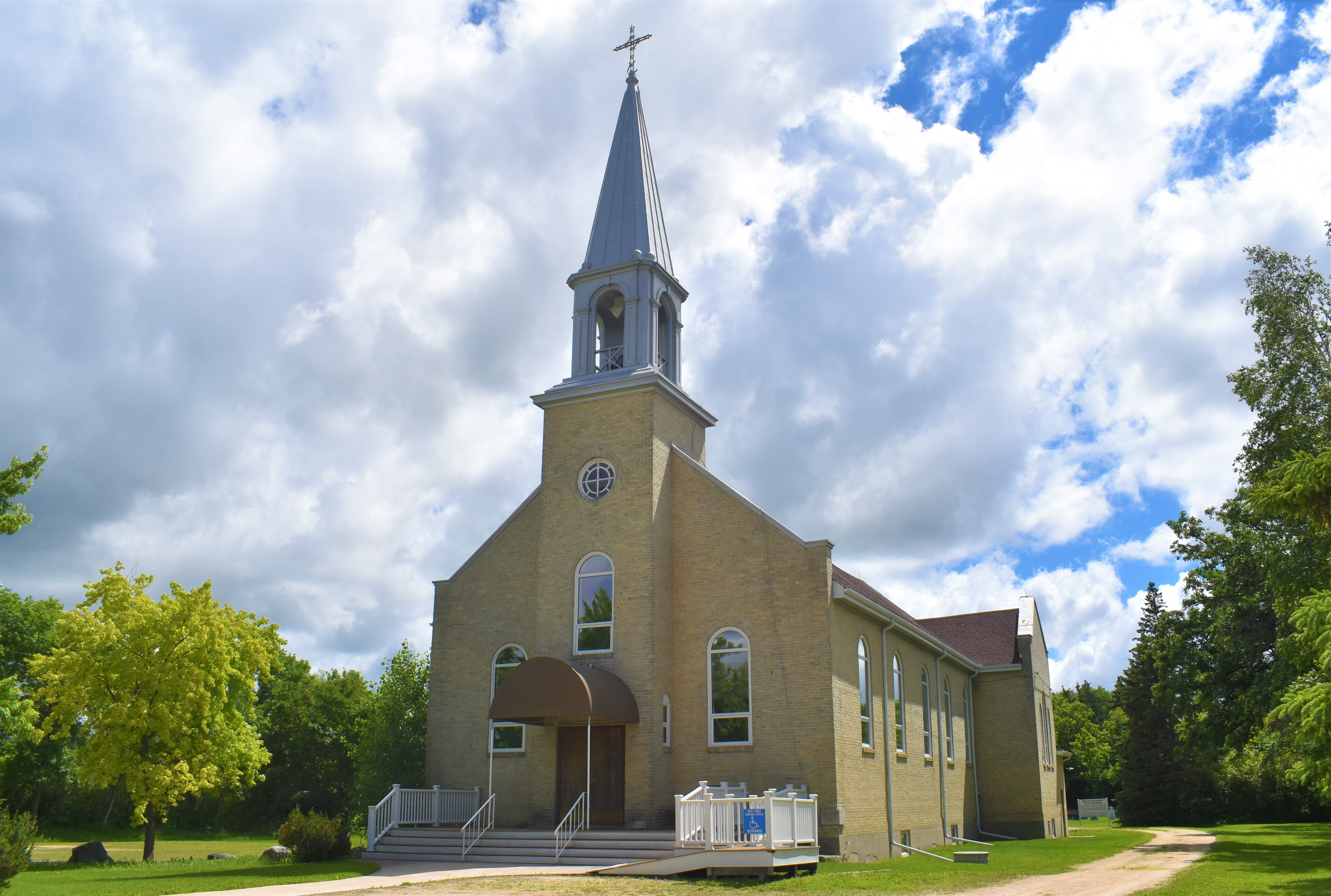
- Aerial view of Elie. Blessed Sacrament Church in Elie. Downtown Elie

- Location of Elie, Manitoba
- Coordinates: 49°54′06″N 97°45′29″W
- Country: Canada
- Province: Manitoba
- Elevation: 400 m (1,300 ft)

Population (2021)
  - Total: 705
- Time zone: UTC−5 (CST)
- Postal code: R0H 0H0
- Area codes: 204, 431

Elie /ˈiːlaɪ/ is an unincorporated community recognized as a local urban district in the Rural Municipality of Cartier in the Canadian province of Manitoba.

== Geography ==
The community is located approximately 30 km (19 mi) west of Winnipeg along the Trans-Canada Highway. The Assiniboine River forms the northern boundary of the municipality of Cartier. Other significant communities around Elie include St. Eustache, Dacotah and Springstein.

== History ==
=== Early history ===
Elie was first established as a flag stop in 1890 on the Canadian Pacific Railway. It was known at the time as "De Tank", after a large water tank constructed there to refuel steam locomotives travelling through the area. Its role as a refuelling point and transit stop for the CPR attracted early settlers.

=== Late 20th century ===
In the early 1980s, Telidon videotex technology was being tested across Canada. Elie was chosen as one of the test beds, with the then government-owned Manitoba Telephone System.

=== June 2007 tornado ===
Canada's first, and only, F5 tornado approaching Elie in June 2007

On June 22, 2007, Elie was hit by an F5 tornado, the most powerful ever recorded in Canada, which damaged a flour mill and destroyed several houses, ripping two well-built houses off their foundations. A car was also thrown 100 metres (330 ft), but the tornado caused no injuries or deaths, as the people had an early warning which provided them with enough time to look for protection. Warnings were provided by Environment Canada.

== Demographics ==
In the 2021 Census of Population conducted by Statistics Canada, Elie had a population of 705 living in 250 of its 257 total private dwellings, a change of 1.3% from its 2016 population of 696. With a land area of 8 km^{2} (3.1 sq mi), it had a population density of 88.1/km^{2} (228.2/sq mi) in 2021.

== Economy ==
The primary industry of Elie is agriculture. The CHMI-DT Transmitter was constructed in 1986 and is located here. A health care centre, a licensed daycare, a bank, a post office, a pharmacy, a grocery shop, a petrol station, an automotive service centre, agricultural equipment service centres, recreational vehicle sales and servicing, and an insurance agency are some of the businesses in this town.
