= St. Ambroise Beach Provincial Park =

Provincial park in Manitoba, Canada

Coordinates: 50°16′33″N 98°04′27″W

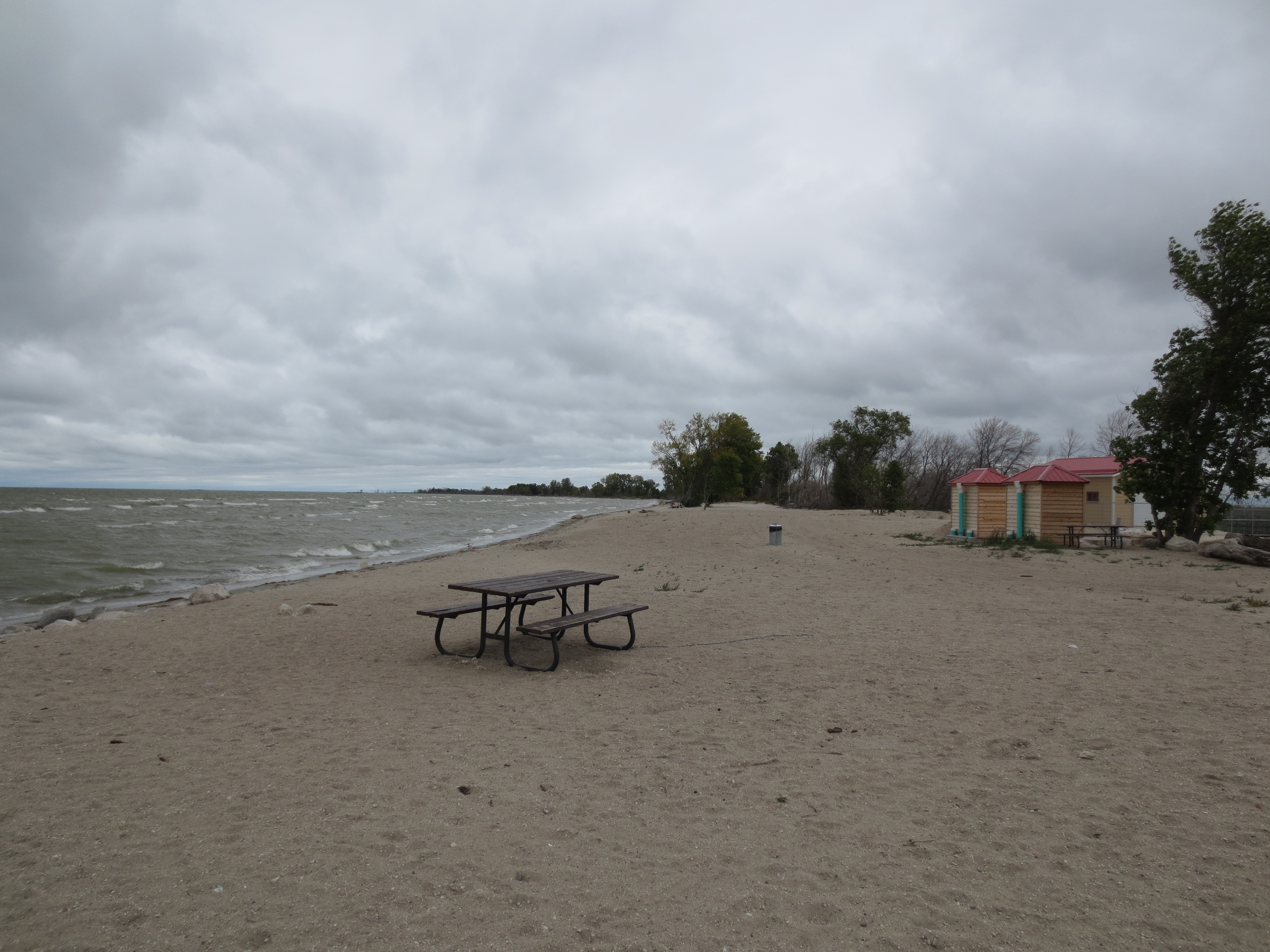
Beach at St. Ambroise Provincial Park on Lake Manitoba

St. Ambroise Beach is a 46-hectare (110-acre) provincial park on the shore of Lake Manitoba in the Rural Municipality of Portage la Prairie of Canada. Established in 1961, the park lies in the Lake Manitoba Plain Ecoregion and is surrounded by marshland, which provides a habitat for waterfowl. The park is open to the public for recreational activities and birding. Piping plovers nest on the beach and warblers, geese and pelicans pass through the park during migration season. A boardwalk with a viewing tower extends into the marsh. St. Ambroise Beach is a stop on the international Pine to Prairie birding trail, which runs from Minnesota through Manitoba.

As a result of extreme flooding in the spring of 2011, the campground facility was closed. The day-use areas at St. Ambroise Beach Provincial Park were re-opened in July 2013. The campground was expected to re-open in 2021 with a full restaurant and bar with VLTS.
