= Southern Manitoba =

Coordinates: 49.55°N 98.04°W

- Geographic region
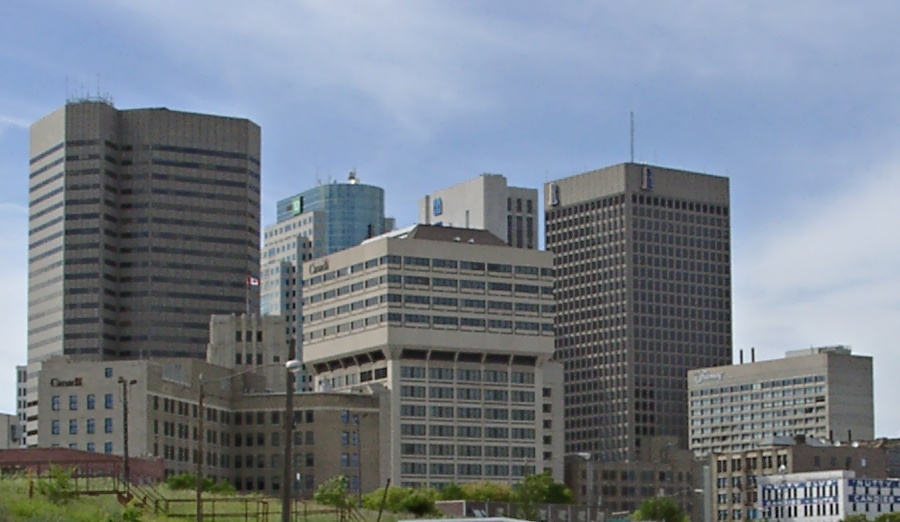
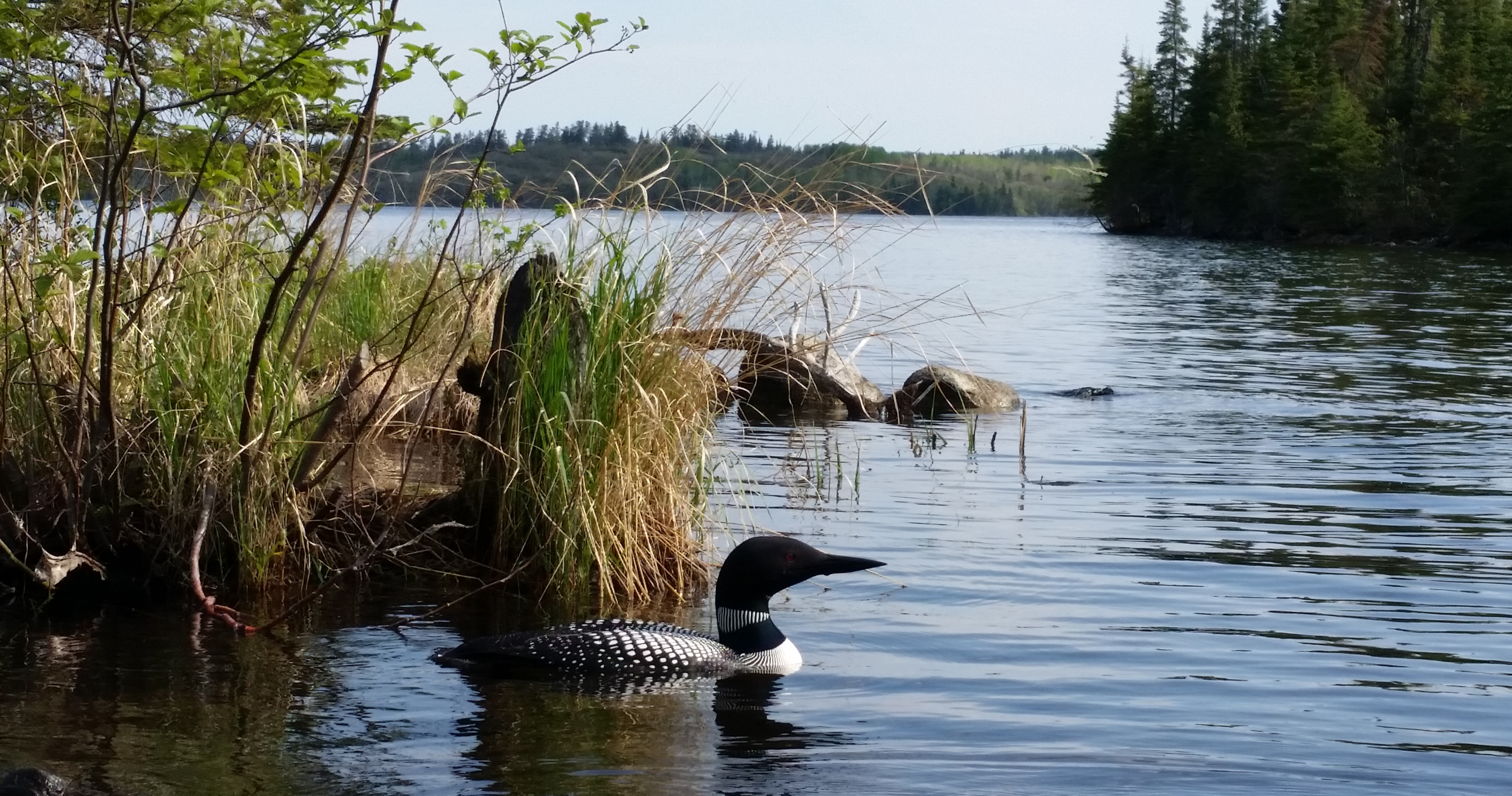
- Top: Winnipeg skyline; Bottom: Loon seen at Falcon Lake, Whiteshell Provincial Park
- Interactive map of Southern Manitoba
- Country: Canada
- Province: Manitoba
- Largest population centres: Winnipeg; Selkirk; Brandon; Portage la Prairie; Morden; Winkler; Steinbach

Population (2021)
  - Total: 1,114,051

Southern Manitoba is the southernmost area of the Canadian province of Manitoba. Southern Manitoba encompasses the Winnipeg Metropolitan Region, Westman Region, Central Plains Region, Eastman Region, and Pembina Valley Region, as well as the Manitoba portion of Red River Valley. Holding a population of over one million, seven of the ten cities in Manitoba are located in this area, including Winnipeg, Brandon, Portage la Prairie, Selkirk, Morden, Winkler, and Steinbach.

== Geography ==
Southern Manitoba provides water corridors for the Red, Souris River and Assiniboine River. Natural vegetation ranges from prairie grassland to aspen, and boreal forest in the Whiteshell Provincial Park in southeast Manitoba. At Spruce Woods Provincial Park, near Carberry, Manitoba a remnant of a sandy delta of the Assiniboine River created a rare Canadian desert area with sand dunes and cacti. Manitoba's most fertile farmlands correspond to the rich black soils found along the Red River Valley and southwestern Manitoba. Petroleum fields of the Williston Basin in North Dakota extend into the southwestern part of the province up to Virden, Manitoba.

== Economy ==
Southern Manitoba’s economy continues to be recognized as one of the most diversified in Canada. Reports by Moody’s Investors Service, Standard and Poor’s, Dominion Bond Rating Service, and CIBC all cite economic diversity as one of the province’s major economic strengths. Diversity provides long-term economic stability, and ensures that southern Manitoba firms have access to a variety of supplies and services.

== Transportation ==
Southern Manitoba's central location in North America makes it a key part of the Mid Continent Trade & Transportation Corridor, connecting to a market of 100 million people. Both the Trans Canada Highway and the Yellowhead Highway provide key east-west traffic corridors from southern Manitoba to the neighboring provinces of Saskatchewan and Ontario. Provincial Highways 75 and 59 lead one hour south from Winnipeg to link with the U.S. National Highway System via North Dakota and Minnesota, providing key access to the Mid Continent Trade & Transportation Corridor centered on US Interstate highways I-29 and I-35, which connects Canada to a central-North American market of 100 million people. Goods can be shipped by truck and rail from Canada through southern Manitoba to Mexico and all points between. The border crossing at Emerson processes over $15 billion in trade traffic annually (2013), more than any other border crossing in Western Canada, and 5th largest in Canada. An estimated 400,000 commercial trucks crossed the border through Emerson in 2013 to the United States of America. Approximately 65% of Manitoba’s exports to NAFTA partners (U.S. and Mexico) are transported by truck through the Emerson/Pembina crossing in southern Manitoba. Intermodal in nature, the Corridor allows cost-effective and safe movement of goods and people, minimizing both travel costs and time. Manitoba trade with the US Corridor states alone (North Dakota, South Dakota, Minnesota, Iowa, Nebraska, Kansas, Wisconsin, Illinois, Michigan, Indiana, Missouri, Oklahoma and Texas) was $15.7 billion in 2014 (Exports: $5.6 billion, Imports: $10.1 billion).

== Recreation ==
Provincial parks found in Southern Manitoba include the St. Malo, Spruce Woods, Whiteshell, Turtle Mountain, and Nopiming, as well as several municipal parks and trails. Notable trails in the region are the Trans Canada Trail and Manitoba’s Pine to Prairie International Birding Trail, a northern extension of the Pine to Prairie Birding Trail that was developed in northwestern Minnesota. Southern Manitoba is a premier birding site for both the novice and experienced birder. Here in the centre of the continent are bird species representative of the north, south, east and western North America.

== See also ==
- Northern Manitoba
