= Rural Municipality of Dufferin =

Rural municipality in Manitoba, Canada

Dufferin
- Rural municipality
- Rural Municipality of Dufferin
- Location of Dufferin in Manitoba
- Coordinates: 49°31′55″N 98°04′12″W
- Country: Canada
- Province: Manitoba
- Region: Pembina Valley
- Incorporated: November 1, 1890

Area
  - Total: 916.11 km^{2} (353.71 sq mi)

Population (2021)
  - Total: 2,543
  - Density: 2.776/km^{2} (7.189/sq mi)
- Time zone: UTC-6 (CST)
  - Summer (DST): UTC-5 (CDT)

Dufferin is a rural municipality in the Pembina Valley Region of the province of Manitoba in Western Canada. The separately administered town of Carman lies near its centre.

The R.M. was named after Frederick Hamilton-Temple-Blackwood, 1st Marquess of Dufferin and Ava who was Governor General of Canada (1872–78). The now rural municipality was described as a new settlement in 1874.

== Communities ==
- Barnsley
- Graysville
- Homewood
- Roseisle
- Stephenfield

== Demographics ==
In the 2021 Census of Population conducted by Statistics Canada, Dufferin had a population of 2,543 living in 761 of its 806 total private dwellings, a change of 4.4% from its 2016 population of 2,435. With a land area of 916.11 km^{2} (353.71 sq mi), it had a population density of 2.8/km^{2} (7.2/sq mi) in 2021.
