= Carman, Manitoba =

Town in Manitoba, Canada

Carman
- Town
- Town of Carman
- Town boundaries

- Location in the province of Manitoba
- Coordinates: 49°29′57″N 98°0′3″W
- Country: Canada
- Province: Manitoba
- Region: Pembina Valley
- Census division: 3
- Settled: 1870
- Incorporated (town): January 1, 1905

Government
  - Mayor: Brent Owen
  - MLA: Lauren Stone

Area
  - Total: 4.32 km^{2} (1.67 sq mi)
- Elevation: 270 m (880 ft)

Population (2021)
  - Total: 3,114
  - Density: 721/km^{2} (1,870/sq mi)
- Time zone: UTC-6 (CST)
  - Summer (DST): UTC-5 (CDT)
- Postal code: R0G 0J0
- Area code(s): 204 & 431
- Website: townofcarman.com

Carman is an agricultural town of about 3,000 people in the Pembina Valley Region of southern Manitoba, Canada. Carman is at the junction of Highways 3 and 13, 40 minutes southwest of Winnipeg. It is surrounded by the Rural Municipality of Dufferin, in the heart of a rich prairie agricultural belt, 60 km (37 mi) north of the American state of North Dakota. The Boyne River passes through Carman.

== Demographics ==
Historical population
Year	Pop.	±%
1901	1,439	—
1911	1,271	−11.7%
1921	1,591	+25.2%
1931	1,418	−10.9%
1941	1,455	+2.6%
1951	1,867	+28.3%
1961	1,930	+3.4%
1996	2,704	+40.1%
2001	2,831	+4.7%
2006	2,781	−1.8%
2011	3,027	+8.8%
2016	3,164	+4.5%
2021	3,114	−1.6%

In the 2021 Census of Population conducted by Statistics Canada, Carman had a population of 3,114 living in 1,402 of its 1,466 total private dwellings, a change of −1.6% from its 2016 population of 3,164. With a land area of 4.32 km^{2} (1.67 sq mi), it had a population density of 720.8/km^{2} (1,866.9/sq mi) in 2021.

== Arts and culture ==
Located in a historic railway station, the Golden Prairie Arts Council facilitates local arts activities. The Carman Active Living Centre (ALC) was established in 2002.

Located in Carman is the Dufferin Historical Museum, open from the middle of June to the beginning of September annually from 10:00 AM to 5:00 PM.

Every April, the Canadian Wall of Fame for exceptional violin talent is held. In February (vocal/choral/speech arts and band/instrumental) and April (piano/strings and dance), Carman hosts the Tempo Festival of the Arts. One of Manitoba's longest existing choral groups is the Sonatrice Singers. The group has been meeting and performing since 1972.

== Sports ==
Sports facilities include an ice arena and an 18-hole golf course. The curling club shares clubroom space with golfers. The town contains several baseball diamonds and soccer pitches. Local hockey teams include the Carman Beavers and the Carman Collegiate Cougars.

== Education ==
Carman is home to a University of Manitoba campus as well as the high school Carman Collegiate, Carman Elementary School, Dufferin Christian School, and various Hutterian schools around the area.

== Economy ==
Large agricultural businesses include Aubin Nurseries, and Vanderveens Greenhouses, both of which are large Canadian wholesalers of plants.

== Government and politics ==
Carman is governed by a mayor and six councillors who are elected by residents. The current mayor of Carman is Brent Owen. The current councillors are Robert Bryson (deputy mayor), Carly Boklaschuk, Dale Reimer, Erin Lemky (Dunn), Lindsay Boeve, and Richard Dyck.

Winkler is represented in the Legislative Assembly of Manitoba (as part of the Midland electoral district) by Progressive Conservative MLA, Lauren Stone, and in the House of Commons of Canada (as part of the Portage—Lisgar riding) by Conservative MP, Branden Leslie.

== Events ==
=== Carman Country Fair ===
The Dufferin Agricultural Society Inc. hosts one of the oldest running fairs in Manitoba; the Carman Country Fair. The fair was established in 1879 and is an affiliate of the Canadian Association of Fairs and Exhibitions.

The three-day event is held annually on the second weekend in July. Events of the fair include 4-H and livestock shows, craft, flower and baking competitions, trade show venues, motor sports shows and a midway, along with entertainment throughout the weekend.

== Climate ==
Carman has a humid continental climate (Dfb). The highest humidex reading in Canada was recorded in Carman in 2007, with an extreme high of 53.

Climate data for Carman, 1981−2010 normal's
Month	Jan	Feb	Mar	Apr	May	Jun	Jul	Aug	Sep	Oct	Nov	Dec	Year
Record high humidex	8.8	10.6	17.2	29.5	39.3	48.1	52.6	48.9	41.7	30.7	22.1	11.6	52.6
Record high °C (°F)	8.0 (46.4)	11.5 (52.7)	18.3 (64.9)	28.5 (83.3)	35.0 (95.0)	38.0 (100.4)	35.5 (95.9)	38.0 (100.4)	35.5 (95.9)	32.2 (90.0)	22.5 (72.5)	12.5 (54.5)	38.7 (101.7)
Mean daily maximum °C (°F)	−10.3 (13.5)	−6.6 (20.1)	−0.6 (30.9)	10.5 (50.9)	18.1 (64.6)	22.9 (73.2)	25.3 (77.5)	25.1 (77.2)	19.9 (67.8)	10.9 (51.6)	0.3 (32.5)	−6.8 (19.8)	9.1 (48.4)
Daily mean °C (°F)	−15.5 (4.1)	−11.8 (10.8)	−5.3 (22.5)	4.5 (40.1)	11.6 (52.9)	17.2 (63.0)	19.5 (67.1)	18.4 (65.1)	13.4 (56.1)	5.4 (41.7)	−4.2 (24.4)	−11.5 (11.3)	3.5 (38.3)
Mean daily minimum °C (°F)	−20.5 (−4.9)	−16.9 (1.6)	−9.9 (14.2)	−1.5 (29.3)	5.0 (41.0)	11.4 (52.5)	13.4 (56.1)	11.9 (53.4)	6.9 (44.4)	−0.1 (31.8)	−8.7 (16.3)	−16.0 (3.2)	−2.1 (28.2)
Record low °C (°F)	−39.5 (−39.1)	−40.5 (−40.9)	−34.0 (−29.2)	−20.5 (−4.9)	−8.5 (16.7)	1.0 (33.8)	3.5 (38.3)	1.0 (33.8)	−6.0 (21.2)	−19.0 (−2.2)	−26.0 (−14.8)	−36.0 (−32.8)	−40.5 (−40.9)
Record low wind chill	−50.7	−51.7	−41.0	−28.8	−11.8	−3.6	0.0	0.0	−7.1	−21.4	−35.2	−45.1	−51.7
Average precipitation mm (inches)	17.9 (0.70)	16.1 (0.63)	20.8 (0.82)	29.5 (1.16)	69.6 (2.74)	96.4 (3.80)	78.6 (3.09)	74.8 (2.94)	49.0 (1.93)	43.4 (1.71)	24.9 (0.98)	24.1 (0.95)	545.0 (21.46)
Average rainfall mm (inches)	0.0 (0.0)	1.7 (0.07)	9.3 (0.37)	20.2 (0.80)	67.7 (2.67)	96.4 (3.80)	78.6 (3.09)	74.8 (2.94)	49.0 (1.93)	38.2 (1.50)	7.1 (0.28)	2.2 (0.09)	445.3 (17.53)
Average snowfall cm (inches)	17.9 (7.0)	14.3 (5.6)	11.5 (4.5)	9.2 (3.6)	1.9 (0.7)	0.0 (0.0)	0.0 (0.0)	0.0 (0.0)	0.0 (0.0)	5.1 (2.0)	18.4 (7.2)	21.9 (8.6)	100.2 (39.4)
Source: Environment Canada Humidex/Windchill

== Health services ==
Carman is a part of the Southern Regional Health Authority.

=== Carman Memorial Hospital ===
The 28-bed Carman Memorial Hospital, at 350 - 4th Street S.W. on the south edge of town, was built in 1982 and is served by several doctors and a staff of 75. It provides family medicine, a surgical program, pediatrics, a dietitian service, physiotherapy, diagnostics services, an internal medicine consultant and an in-house pharmacy.

There are two medical clinics in the Town of Carman. One clinic imports doctors from neighbouring Winkler, Manitoba. The other clinic has two well-established doctors (one being a surgeon) who have served Carman for many years.

=== Emergency services ===
The Carman Fire Department has approximately 25 volunteer firefighters. The department coverage includes both the Town of Carman and the R.M. of Dufferin.

Carman Ambulance is one of many ambulance services within the Southern Regional Health Authority. The service area covers about 600 square miles (1,600 km^{2}) and includes the town of Carman, Elm Creek, Stephenfield, Graysville, Roland, Homewood and Sperling.

== Media ==
- The Valley Leader (newspaper) was published weekly and delivered to every home in Carman on Thursday. It stopped printing in 2020, but since then The Dufferin Standard has started up.
- Up until 1964, a 500' transmitter for CBC Radio was in Carman, at which time a new centralized communications tower at Starbuck, Manitoba was constructed to house CBW-AM, CBW-FM, CBWT, and CBWFT. In February 1952, a small plane with three passengers struck the Carman tower due to heavy fog. None of the passengers survived.
- Numerous movies have been filmed in and around the Town of Carman, including The Defender (1989), We Were the Mulvaneys (2002), One Week (2008), Make It Happen (2008), The Box Collector (2008), and I Still See You (2018).

== Notable people ==
- Wade Allison, hockey player
- Ed Belfour, hockey goalie
- Jack Carson, actor
- Robert Carson, actor
- Faouzia, musician
- Paul Hiebert, writer
- Lynette Loeppky, writer
- Frank McKinnon, CM, sports executive
