= Oakville, Manitoba =

Coordinates: 49°55′46″N 98°00′14″W

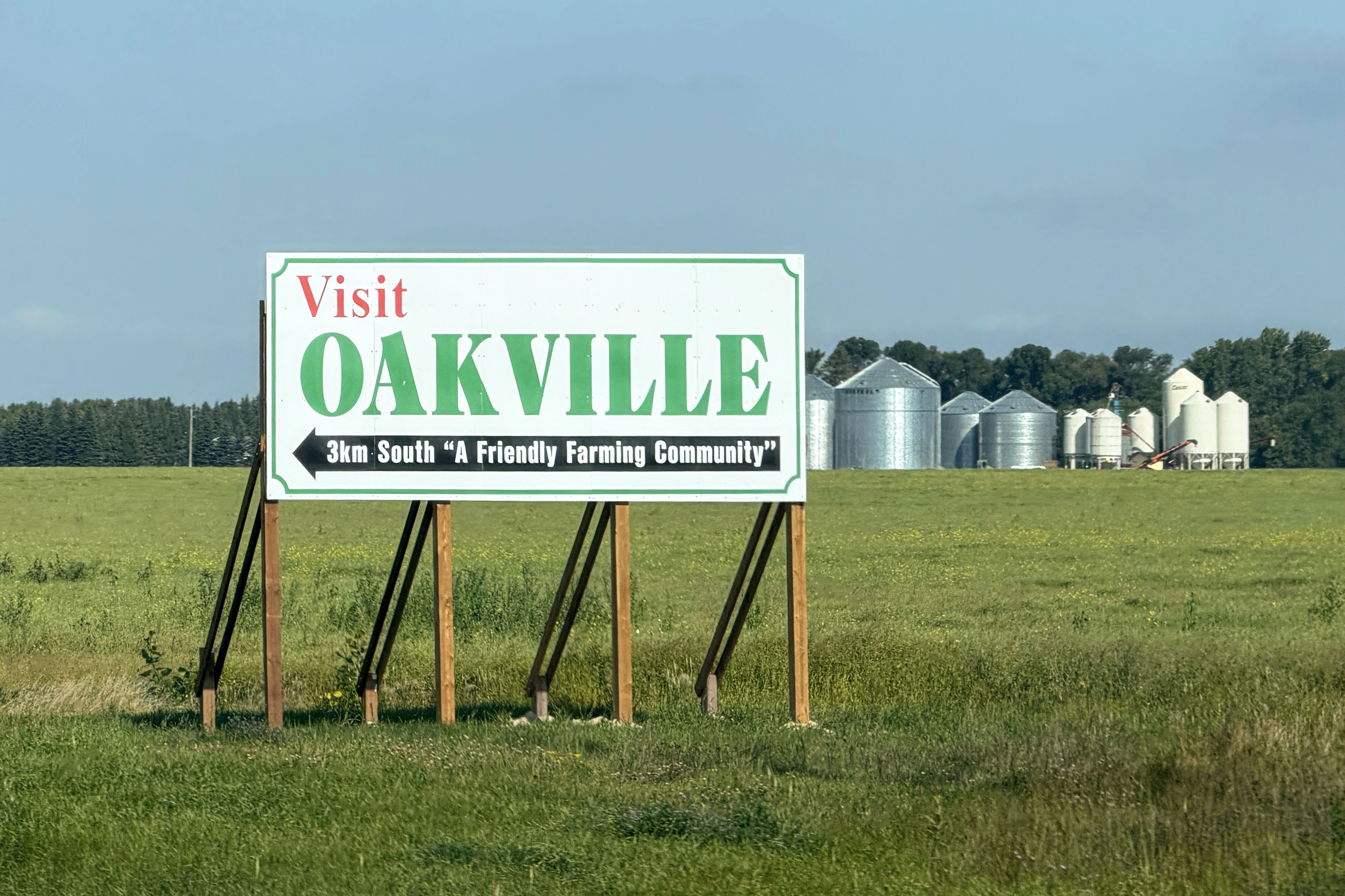
Welcome sign along the Trans-Canada Highway

Oakville, Manitoba is an unincorporated community recognized as a local urban district in Manitoba. It is located in the Rural Municipality of Portage la Prairie. Oakville is 56 km (35 mi) west of Winnipeg at the intersection of PTH 13 and PR 331.

== Demographics ==
In the 2021 Census of Population conducted by Statistics Canada, Oakville had a population of 652 living in 253 of its 263 total private dwellings, a change of 5% from its 2016 population of 621. With a land area of 2.71 km^{2} (1.05 sq mi), it had a population density of 240.6/km^{2} (623.1/sq mi) in 2021.
