= Rural Municipality of Portage la Prairie =

Rural municipality in Manitoba, Canada

- Rural municipality
- Location of the RM of Portage la Prairie in Manitoba
- Coordinates: 50°02′56″N 98°12′58″W
- Country: Canada
- Province: Manitoba
- Region: Central Plains

Area
  - Land: 1,961.97 km^{2} (757.52 sq mi)

Population (2016)
  - Total: 6,975
- Time zone: UTC-6 (CST)
  - Summer (DST): UTC-5 (CDT)
- Area codes: 204 and 431
- Website: https://www.rmofportage.ca/

Portage la Prairie is a rural municipality (RM) in the province of Manitoba in Western Canada. It surrounds the city of Portage la Prairie, Manitoba's fifth-largest city. Also within the borders of the municipality are the Dakota Plains First Nation and most of the Long Plain First Nation Indian reserves.

== Communities ==
- Bloom
- Curtis
- Delta Beach
- Edwin
- Fortier
- Fulton
- High Bluff
- Layland
- Longburn
- Macdonald
- Newton
- Oakland
- Oakville
- Poplar Point
- Rignold
- St. Ambroise
- Southport

== Demographics ==
In the 2021 Census of Population conducted by Statistics Canada, Portage la Prairie had a population of 6,888 living in 2,167 of its 2,456 total private dwellings, a change of −1.2% from its 2016 population of 6,975. With a land area of 1,973.45 km^{2} (761.95 sq mi), it had a population density of 3.5/km^{2} (9.0/sq mi) in 2021.

Panethnic groups in the Rural Municipality of Portage la Prairie (2001−2021)
Panethnic group	2021		2016		2011		2006		2001	
Panethnic group	Pop.	%	Pop.	%	Pop.	%	Pop.	%	Pop.	%
European (Note: Statistic includes all persons that did not make up part of a visible minority or an indigenous identity.)	4,255	78.51%	4,410	77.57%	4,405	81.88%	5,780	85.06%	6,005	88.44%
Indigenous	1,045	19.28%	1,165	20.49%	840	15.61%	1,000	14.72%	730	10.75%
African	40	0.74%	50	0.88%	0	0%	10	0.15%	0	0%
East Asian (Note: Statistic includes total responses of "Chinese", "Korean", and "Japanese" under visible minority section on census.)	25	0.46%	40	0.7%	65	1.21%	20	0.29%	35	0.52%
Southeast Asian (Note: Statistic includes total responses of "Filipino" and "Southeast Asian" under visible minority section on census.)	25	0.46%	0	0%	0	0%	0	0%	15	0.22%
South Asian	20	0.37%	25	0.44%	0	0%	0	0%	0	0%
Middle Eastern (Note: Statistic includes total responses of "West Asian" and "Arab" under visible minority section on census.)	0	0%	20	0.35%	0	0%	0	0%	10	0.15%
Latin American	0	0%	10	0.18%	25	0.46%	0	0%	0	0%
Other/multiracial (Note: Statistic includes total responses of "Visible minority, n.i.e." and "Multiple visible minorities" under visible minority section on census.)	0	0%	10	0.18%	35	0.65%	0	0%	0	0%
Total responses	5,420	78.69%	5,685	81.51%	5,380	82.45%	6,795	100.03%	6,790	99.99%
Total population	6,888	100%	6,975	100%	6,525	100%	6,793	100%	6,791	100%
Note: Totals greater than 100% due to multiple origin responses
