= Manitoba Provincial Road 242 =

Provincial road in Manitoba, Canada

Provincial Road 242
- PR 242 highlighted in red
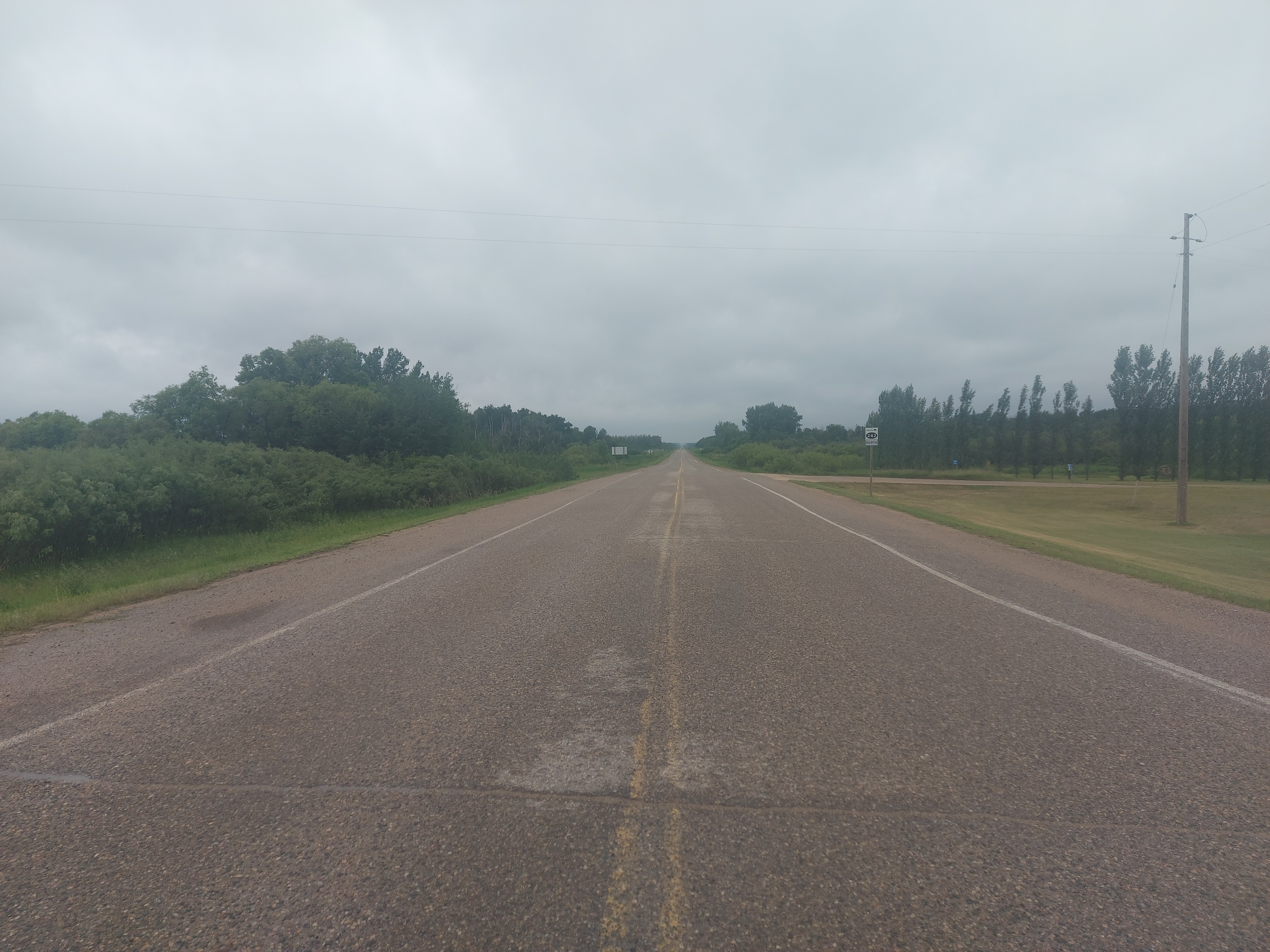
- Provincial Road 242

Route information
- Maintained by Manitoba Infrastructure
- Length: 157 km (98 mi)
- Existed: 1966–present

Major junctions
- North end: Lynchs Point on Lake Manitoba
- PTH 16 (TCH) / YH at Westbourne; PTH 1 (TCH) at Bagot; PTH 2 near Treherne; PTH 23 near Somerset; PTH 3 at La Rivière
- South end: CR 13 at the U.S. border near Snowflake

Location
- Country: Canada
- Province: Manitoba
- Rural municipalities: Lorne; Louise; Norfolk Treherne; North Norfolk; Pembina; Portage la Prairie; WestLake – Gladstone

Highway system
- Provincial highways in Manitoba; Winnipeg City Routes
← PR 241	→ PR 243

Provincial Road 242 (PR 242) is a 157-kilometre-long (98 mi) north–south provincial road in the Pembina Valley and Central Plains Regions of Manitoba, Canada.

PR 242 begins at the Hannah–Snowflake Border Crossing on the Canada–United States border near Snowflake and terminates at Lynchs Point on the south shore of Lake Manitoba, in the Municipality of WestLake – Gladstone. It is a paved, two-lane road from the U.S. border to La Rivière (PTH 3) and from PTH 2 to the Trans-Canada Highway; the remainder is mostly gravel.

At the U.S. border, PR 242 connects with Cavalier County Road 13.

== Route description ==
PR 242 begins at the Hannah-Snowflake Border Crossing in the Municipality of Lorne, with the road continuing south to the town of Hannah, North Dakota as Cavalier County Road 13 (CR 13). The highway immediately goes through a switchback before heading north as a paved two-lane highway along the border between the Municipalities of Lorne and Pembina, passing through Snowflake to have a junction with PR 201. It has an intersection with PR 423 before fully entering the Municipality of Pembina as it winds its way down into the Pembina River Valley, crossing the river to enter the town of La Rivière. The highway travels straight through the centre of town along Broadway Street, where it becomes concurrent (overlapped) with PTH 3 (Boundary Commission Trail) and the two head west for a short distance to leave La Rivière. PR 242 now splits off as a gravel road and climbs its way out of the river valley before zigzagging between some sharp left and right turns for the next several kilometres.

After entering flat rural farmland, PR 242 crosses into the Municipality of Lorne, having a junction with PTH 23 before entering the hamlet of Somerset. The highway temporarily becomes paved and known as Third Street, traversing neighbourhoods before passing through downtown, formerly crossing a railway here. It passes through some neighbourhoods before leaving town and becoming unpaved once again. PR 242 enters the Municipality of Norfolk Treherne during a short concurrency with PR 245. The highway travels along the eastern edge of the town of Treherne, where it becomes paved and has a short concurrency with PTH 2 (Red Coat Trail) before continuing due north through rural areas to cross the Assiniboine River.

Entering the Municipality of North Norfolk at an intersection with PR 350 (Former PR 461) just east of Lavenham, the highway makes a couple of sharp turns before passing straight through the center of Rosendale. The highway continues north through farmland for several more kilometres, passing through the hamlet of Bagot, where it crosses a railway, PTH 1 (Trans-Canada Highway), and becomes unpaved once more.

PR 242 enters the Municipality of WestLake-Gladstone and makes a sharp right turn to begin following the Whitemud River. After having a short concurrency with PTH 16 (Yellowhead Highway), it bypasses the hamlet of Westbourne along its eastern side before becoming more narrow and winding for the next several kilometres, temporarily entering the Rural Municipality of Portage la Prairie and crossing a small creek. The highway begins following the coastline of southern Lake Manitoba shortly before coming to a dead end at the Lynchs Point Campground. The entire length of Provincial Road 242 is a two-lane highway.

== Major intersections ==
Division	Location	km	mi	Destinations	Notes
Louise		0.0	0.0	CR 13 – Hannah	Continuation into North Dakota
Louise		0.0	0.0	Canada–United States border at the Hannah-Snowflake Border Crossing	
Louise / Pembina boundary	Snowflake	6.1	3.8	PR 201 east – Snowflake	Western terminus of PR 201
Louise / Pembina boundary		15.9	9.9	PR 423 west – Crystal City	Eastern terminus of PR 423
Pembina	La Rivière	27.4– 27.5	17.0– 17.1	Bridge over the Pembina River	
Pembina	La Rivière	28.4	17.6	PTH 3 east (Boundary Commission Trail) – Manitou	Southern end of PTH 3 concurrency
Pembina		29.0	18.0	PTH 3 west (Boundary Commission Trail) – Pilot Mound	Northern end of PTH 3 concurrency; southern end of unpaved section
Lorne	Somerset	49.3	30.6	PTH 23 – Ninette, Morris	
Lorne / Norfolk Treherne boundary		64.1	39.8	PR 245 east – Notre Dame de Lourdes	Southern end of PR 245 concurrency
Lorne / Norfolk Treherne boundary		66.2	41.1	PR 245 west – Holland	Northern end of PR 245 concurrency
Norfolk Treherne	Treherne	77.8	48.3	PTH 2 west (Red Coat Trail) – Treherne	Southern end of PTH 2 concurrency; northern end of unpaved section
Norfolk Treherne		81.2	50.5	PTH 2 east (Red Coat Trail) – Rathwell	Northern end of PTH 2 concurrency
Norfolk Treherne		94.3– 94.4	58.6– 58.7	Bridge over the Assiniboine River	
Norfolk Treherne / North Norfolk boundary		98.7	61.3	PR 350 north – Lavenham	Southern terminus of PR 350; former PR 461
North Norfolk	Bagot	120.2	74.7	PTH 1 (TCH) – Brandon, Portage la Prairie	Southern end of unpaved section
WestLake - Gladstone	Westbourne	139.8	86.9	PTH 16 (TCH) west / YH – Gladstone	Southern end of PTH 16 concurrency
WestLake - Gladstone		141.9	88.2	PTH 16 (TCH) east / YH – Portage la Prairie	Northern end of PTH 16 concurrency
WestLake - Gladstone		144.2	89.6	Main Street – Westbourne	Former PR 242
Portage la Prairie	No major junctions				
WestLake - Gladstone	Lynchs Point	157	98	Dead end at Lynchs Point Campground on Lake Manitoba	Northern terminus; northern end of unpaved section
1.000 mi = 1.609 km; 1.000 km = 0.621 mi: Concurrency terminus; Route transition
