= Portage—Lisgar =

Federal electoral district in Manitoba, Canada

Coordinates: 49.667°N 98.305°W

Manitoba electoral district
- Interactive map of riding boundaries from the 2025 federal election

Federal electoral district
- Legislature: House of Commons
MP
Branden Leslie
Conservative
- District created: 1996
- First contested: 1997
- Last contested: 2025
- District webpage: profile, map

Demographics
- Population (2021): 100,417
- Electors (2021): 68,241
- Area (km²): 12,559.18
- Pop. density (per km²): 8
- Census division(s): Division No. 3, Division No. 4, Division No. 8, Division No. 9, Division No. 10
- Census subdivision(s): Winkler, Portage la Prairie, Morden, Stanley, Macdonald, Portage la Prairie (part), Rhineland, Altona, Cartier, Carman

Portage—Lisgar is a federal electoral district in Manitoba, Canada, that has been represented in the House of Commons of Canada since 1997.

== Demographics ==
Population, 2021 census	100,417
Electors	68,241
Area (km^{2})	12,559.18
Population density (people per km^{2})	8

According to the 2021 Canadian census

Ethnic groups: 82.3% White, 11.5% Indigenous, 2.2% Filipino, 1.5% South Asian
Languages: 70.5% English, 11.7% German, 7.7% Plautdietsch/Low German/Low Saxon, 3.5% French, 1.5% Russian, 1.2% Tagalog
Median income: $37,200 (2020)
Average income: $45,560 (2020)

Panethnic groups in Portage—Lisgar (2011−2021)
Panethnic group	2021		2016		2011	
Panethnic group	Pop.	%	Pop.	%	Pop.	%
European (Note: Statistic includes all persons that did not make up part of a visible minority or an indigenous identity.)	77,810	82.3%	78,120	85.34%	75,645	88.41%
Indigenous	10,835	11.46%	10,475	11.44%	7,870	9.2%
Southeast Asian (Note: Statistic includes total responses of "Filipino" and "Southeast Asian" under visible minority section on census.)	2,170	2.3%	975	1.07%	510	0.6%
South Asian	1,425	1.51%	555	0.61%	340	0.4%
African	750	0.79%	430	0.47%	435	0.51%
Latin American	605	0.64%	220	0.24%	245	0.29%
East Asian (Note: Statistic includes total responses of "Chinese", "Korean", and "Japanese" under visible minority section on census.)	395	0.42%	390	0.43%	70	0.08%
Middle Eastern (Note: Statistic includes total responses of "West Asian" and "Arab" under visible minority section on census.)	310	0.33%	235	0.26%	280	0.33%
Other/multiracial (Note: Statistic includes total responses of "Visible minority, n.i.e." and "Multiple visible minorities" under visible minority section on census.)	265	0.28%	155	0.17%	15	0.02%
Total responses	94,550	94.16%	91,545	94.03%	85,565	94.01%
Total population	100,417	100%	97,354	100%	91,019	100%
Notes: Totals greater than 100% due to multiple origin responses. Demographics based on 2012 Canadian federal electoral redistribution riding boundaries.

According to the 2011 Census, Portage—Lisgar was the riding with the highest percentage of native German speakers (23.6% of the population at the time) in all of Canada. Only Inuktitut (Nunavut: 66.8%) and Panjabi (Punjabi) (Newton—North Delta, in British Columbia: 33.4%) exceed this concentration of native speakers of a non-official language in a single riding.

== Geography ==
This is a rural district that encompasses most of Central Manitoba. It includes the cities of Portage la Prairie, Winkler, and Morden, and the towns of Carman, Morris and Altona.

As a rural Western riding, the Conservatives dominate this riding, except for in First Nations areas. In 2021, due to opposition to COVID-19 restrictions, the People's Party broke through and were able to do strongly in areas with large Mennonite populations like the Rural Municipality of Stanley, the Municipality of Rhineland and Winkler, municipalities that went heavily Conservative in 2019. Because of this shift in 2021, the Conservatives did best in rural areas with fewer Mennonites, such as the Municipality of Norfolk Treherne. In 2021, the NDP was able to win both the Swan Lake First Nation and Long Plain First Nation. The Liberals are also strong in the Long Plain First Nation, which they won in 2019, and also have some residual strength in the Rural Municipality of St. François Xavier.

== History ==
The electoral district was created in 1996 from the former districts of Lisgar—Marquette and Portage—Interlake. It originally consisted of the rural municipalities of Argyle, Cartier, Dufferin, Grey, Lakeview, Lorne, Louise, Macdonald, North Cypress, North Norfolk, Pembina, Portage la Prairie (except for the northeast corner), Roblin, Roland, South Norfolk, Stanley, Thompson, Victoria and Westbourne; the cities of Portage la Prairie and Winkler; the towns of Carberry, Carman, Gladstone, Manitou, Morden, Pilot Mound, and Treherne; the villages of Cartwright, Crystal City, MacGregor, Notre Dame de Lourdes, Somerset, and St. Claude; and the Indian reserves of Dakota Plains 6A, Long Plain 6, and Swan Lake 7.

In the 2003 redistribution, it lost the rural municipalities of Lakeview and Westbourne and the town of Gladstone to Dauphin—Swan River; and the rural municipalities of Argyle, North Cypress and Roblin, the town of Carberry, and the village of Cartwright to the riding of Brandon—Souris. It gained the rural municipalities of Rhineland and St. François Xavier; and the towns of Altona, Gretna and Plum Coulee from Provencher.

In the 2012 electoral redistribution, this riding lost the rural municipality of North Norfolk and the town of MacGregor to Dauphin—Swan River—Neepawa and the rural municipalities of Victoria, and Louise and the town of Pilot Mound and the village of Crystal City to Brandon—Souris. It gained the rural municipality and the town of Morris from Provencher and remainder of the rural municipality of Portage la Prairie from Selkirk—Interlake.

=== Members of Parliament ===
This riding has elected the following members of Parliament:

Parliament	Years	Member	Party
Portage—Lisgar; Riding created from Lisgar—Marquette, and Portage—Interlake
36th	1997–2000	Jake Hoeppner	Reform
36th	2000–2000	Jake Hoeppner	Alliance
37th	2000–2003	Brian Pallister	Alliance
37th	2003–2004	Brian Pallister	Conservative
38th	2004–2006	Brian Pallister	Conservative
39th	2006–2008	Brian Pallister	Conservative
40th	2008–2011	Candice Bergen	Conservative
41st	2011–2015	Candice Bergen	Conservative
42nd	2015–2019	Candice Bergen	Conservative
43rd	2019–2021	Candice Bergen	Conservative
44th	2021–2023	Candice Bergen	Conservative
44th	2023–2025	Branden Leslie	Conservative
45th	2025–present	Branden Leslie	Conservative

=== Current member of Parliament ===
Its most recent member of Parliament was Candice Bergen, who resigned on February 1, 2023. She was first elected in the 2008 Canadian federal election.

== Election results ==
Graph of election results in Portage—Lisgar (minor parties that never got 2% of the vote or didn't run consistently are omitted)

2025 Canadian federal election
Party	Candidate	Votes	%	±%	Expenditures
Conservative	Branden Leslie	31,889	69.38		
Liberal	Robert Kreis	10,493	22.82		
New Democratic	Lisa Tessier	2,011	4.38		
People's	Kevin Larson	977	2.13		
Green	Janine G. Gibson	595	1.29		
Total valid votes/expense limit		45,965	99.28		
Total rejected ballots		335	0.72		
Turnout		46,300	67.94		
Eligible voters		68,152			
Source: Elections Canada

2021 federal election redistributed results
Party	Vote	%
Conservative	22,445	52.15
People's	9,418	21.88
New Democratic	5,778	13.42
Liberal	4,720	10.97
Others	681	1.58

Canadian federal by-election, June 19, 2023 Resignation of Candice Bergen
Party	Candidate	Votes	%	±%
Conservative	Branden Leslie	20,250	64.95	+12.43
People's	Max Bernier	5,352	17.16	−4.42
Liberal	Kerry Smith	2,666	8.55	−2.40
New Democratic	Lisa Tessier-Burch	2,208	7.08	−6.30
Green	Nicolas Geddert	704	2.26	–
Total valid votes		31,180	99.40	
Total rejected ballots		188	0.60	−0.15
Turnout		31,368	45.47	−20.77
Eligible voters		68,988		
Conservative hold		Swing		+8.42
Source: Elections Canada

2021 Canadian federal election
Party	Candidate	Votes	%	±%	Expenditures
Conservative	Candice Bergen	23,819	52.52	–18.28	$75,005.66
People's	Solomon Wiebe	9,790	21.58	+18.97	$12,104.29
New Democratic	Ken Friesen	6,068	13.38	+4.70	$2,822.40
Liberal	Andrew Carrier	4,967	10.95	+0.24	$14,348.06
Christian Heritage	Jerome Dondo	712	1.57	–0.36	$7,509.16
Total valid votes/expense limit		45,356	99.25	–	$111,667.24
Total rejected ballots		341	0.75	+0.13	
Turnout		45,697	66.24	–0.40	
Eligible voters		68,991			
Conservative hold		Swing		–18.62	
Source: Elections Canada

2019 Canadian federal election
Party	Candidate	Votes	%	±%	Expenditures
Conservative	Candice Bergen	31,600	70.79	+9.95	$60,166.75
Liberal	Ken Werbiski	4,779	10.71	−15.08	$18,673.74
New Democratic	Cindy Friesen	3,872	8.67	+2.47	$0.00
Green	Beverley Eert	2,356	5.28	+1.30	$6,945.06
People's	Aaron Archer	1,169	2.62		$1,048.91
Christian Heritage	Jerome Dondo	860	1.93	−1.27	$21,830.60
Total valid votes/expense limit		44,636	99.39		
Total rejected ballots		275	0.61	+0.23	
Turnout		44,911	68.64	+1.19	
Eligible voters		67,397			
Conservative hold		Swing		+12.52	
Source: Elections Canada

2015 Canadian federal election
Party	Candidate	Votes	%	±%	Expenditures
Conservative	Candice Bergen	25,060	60.84	−14.95	$91,365.21
Liberal	Ken Werbiski	10,621	25.79	+19.81	$12,481.25
New Democratic	Dean Harder	2,554	6.20	−4.01	$7,315.22
Green	Bev Eert	1,637	3.97	−1.67	$7,832.39
Christian Heritage	Jerome Dondo	1,315	3.19		$20,134.89
Total valid votes/expense limit		41,187	99.62		$208,924.52
Total rejected ballots		159	0.38	–	
Turnout		41,346	65.44	–	
Eligible voters		63,180			
Conservative hold		Swing		−17.38	
Source: Elections Canada

^ Change is from redistributed results

2011 federal election redistributed results
Party	Vote	%
Conservative	25,738	75.79
New Democratic	3,467	10.21
Liberal	2,031	5.98
Green	1,916	5.64
Others	807	2.38

2011 Canadian federal election
Party	Candidate	Votes	%	±%	Expenditures
Conservative	Candice Hoeppner	26,899	75.99	+7.72	–
New Democratic	Mohamed Alli	3,478	9.83	+2.54	–
Liberal	MJ Willard	2,221	6.27	−7.28	–
Green	Matthew Friesen	1,996	5.64	−2.43	–
Christian Heritage	Jerome Dondo	805	2.27	−0.55	–
Total valid votes/expense limit		35,399	99.59		–
Total rejected ballots		147	0.41	+0.06	
Turnout		35,546	59.44	+5.67	
Eligible voters		59,799	–	–	
Conservative hold		Swing		+2.59	

2008 Canadian federal election
Party	Candidate	Votes	%	±%	Expenditures
Conservative	Candice Hoeppner	22,036	68.27	−1.52	$57,186
Liberal	Ted Klassen	4,374	13.55	+2.16	$19,807
Green	Charlie Howatt	2,606	8.07	+2.97	$3,649
New Democratic	Mohamed Alli	2,353	7.29	−3.76	$2,873
Christian Heritage	Len Lodder	911	2.82	+0.14	$8,429
Total valid votes/expense limit		32,280	99.64		$83,296
Total rejected ballots		116	0.36	+0.03	
Turnout		32,396	53.77	–7.89	
Eligible voters		60,246	–	–	
Conservative hold		Swing		−1.84	

2006 Canadian federal election
Party	Candidate	Votes	%	±%	Expenditures
Conservative	Brian Pallister	25,719	69.78	+3.85	$44,321.83
Liberal	Garry McLean	4,199	11.39	−6.35	$13,875.88
New Democratic	Daren Van Den Bussche	4,072	11.05	+1.70	$2,450.07
Green	Charlie Howatt	1,880	5.10	+2.64	$4,073.82
Christian Heritage	David Reimer	987	2.68	−1.51	$9,372.57
Total valid votes		36,857	99.67		
Total rejected ballots		123	0.33	−0.09	
Turnout		36,890	61.66	+4.31	
Eligible voters		59,970	–	–	
Conservative hold		Swing		+5.10	
Sources: Official Results, Elections Canada and Financial Returns, Elections Canada.

2004 Canadian federal election
Party	Candidate	Votes	%	±%	Expenditures
Conservative	Brian Pallister	22,939	65.93	−0.02	$55,524.92
Liberal	Don Kuhl	6,174	17.74	−1.75	$70,773.27
New Democratic	Daren Van Den Bussche	3,251	9.34	+3.89	$13,159.49
Christian Heritage	David Reimer	1,458	4.19		$12,986.64
Green	Marc Payette	856	2.46		$649.69
Communist	Allister Cucksey	117	0.34		$741.52
Total valid votes		34,795	99.58		
Total rejected ballots		146	0.42		
Turnout		34,941	57.35		
Eligible voters		60,922	–	–	
Conservative notional hold		Swing		+0.87	
Percentage change figures are compared to redistributed results from 2000. Conservative Party percentages are contrasted with the combined Canadian Alliance and Progressive Conservative percentages.
Sources: Official Results, Elections Canada and Financial Returns, Elections Canada.

2000 federal election redistributed results
Party	Vote	%
Canadian Alliance	17,680	51.63
Liberal	6,676	19.50
Progressive Conservative	4,902	14.32
Independents	3,118	9.11
New Democratic	1,866	5.45

2000 Canadian federal election
Party	Candidate	Votes	%	±%	Expenditures
Alliance	Brian Pallister	17,318	50.31	+10.07	$44,417.63
Liberal	Gerry J.E. Gebler	6,133	17.82	+3.21	$44,267.57
Progressive Conservative	Morley McDonald	5,339	15.51	−20.42	$16,872.28
Independent	Jake Hoeppner	3,558	10.34		$40,395.49
New Democratic	Diane Beresford	2,073	6.02	−1.17	$3,880.73
Total valid votes		34,421	99.71		
Total rejected ballots		101	0.29	−0.15	
Turnout		34,522	61.56	+0.93	
Eligible voters		56,082	–	–	
Alliance hold		Swing		+3.43	
Sources: Official Results, Elections Canada, Official Voting Results and Financial Returns, Elections Canada.

^ Canadian Alliance results compared to Reform

1997 Canadian federal election
Party	Candidate	Votes	%	Expenditures
Reform	Jake Hoeppner	13,532	40.25	$55,221
Progressive Conservative	Brian Pallister	12,083	35.94	$52,473
Liberal	Heather Mack	4,913	14.61	$14,412
New Democratic	Glen Hallick	2,420	7.20	$9,391
Christian Heritage	Martin Dewit	517	1.54	$2,674
Canadian Action	Roy Lyall	159	0.47	$1,210
Total valid votes		33,624	99.56	
Total rejected ballots		149	0.44	
Turnout		33,773	60.63	
Eligible voters		55,706	–	
Sources: Official Results, Elections Canada, Official Voting Results and Financial Returns, Elections Canada.

== See also ==
- List of Canadian electoral districts
- Historical federal electoral districts of Canada
