= Rural Municipality of Pembina =

Rural municipality in Manitoba, Canada

Coordinates: 49°10′39″N 98°32′27″W

Pembina in Manitoba

The Rural Municipality of Pembina is a former rural municipality (RM) in the Canadian province of Manitoba.

== History ==
It was originally incorporated as a rural municipality on November 1, 1890. It ceased on January 1, 2015 as a result of its provincially mandated amalgamation with the Town of Manitou to form the Municipality of Pembina.

The former RM is located in the southern part of the province, along the border with the state of North Dakota in the United States.

The former RM remains famous as the objective chosen by John O'Neill fin 1871 or what would become the last of the Fenian Raids into Canada from the United States.

The parents of acclaimed American author Norman Maclean, Rev. John Norman Maclean and Clara Davidson, were married at Pembina on August 1, 1893.

Pembina had a population of 1,712 persons as of the 2006 Census, a decline from 1,769 persons reported in the 2001 Census. The Boundary Trail Railway was partly owned by the former RM and serves local producers.

== Geography ==
According to Statistics Canada, the former RM had an area of 1,114.76 km^{2} (430.41 sq mi).

=== Communities ===
- Darlingford
- Kaleida
- Kingsley
- La Rivière
- Mowbray
- Snowflake
- Windygates
