= Thomas Lewis Morton =

Canadian politician

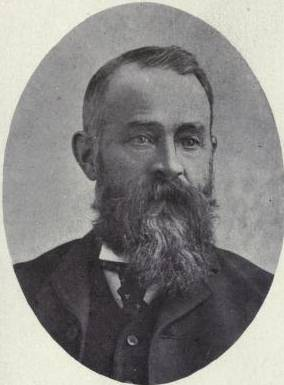

Member of the Legislative Assembly of Manitoba for Westbourne
- In office 1888–1903

Personal details
- Born: June 10, 1846; Hull, Yorkshire, England
- Died: February 24, 1914 (aged 67); Winnipeg, Manitoba

Thomas Lewis Morton (June 10, 1846 – February 24, 1914) was an English-born farmer and political figure in Manitoba. He represented Westbourne from 1888 to 1903 in the Legislative Assembly of Manitoba as a Liberal.

He was born in Hull, Yorkshire, of Scottish descent, and was educated in Gloucester. After completing his education, Morton was employed at a bank in Plymouth. In 1871, he came to Canada and settled on a farm in Gladstone, Manitoba. Morton married Mary Honora Cory in 1876. He served as secretary-treasurer for the Rural Municipality of Westbourne. Morton was defeated when he ran for reelection to the Manitoba assembly in 1903.

He was also involved in the grain trade and later moved to Winnipeg. Morton died at home in Winnipeg at the age of 67. His daughter Margaret married Robert Jacob, who also sat as a Liberal in the Manitoba assembly. His son William also was a member of the assembly.
