= Rural Municipality of Westbourne =

Rural municipality in Manitoba, Canada

Coordinates: 50°17′04″N 98°50′09″W

The Rural Municipality of Westbourne is a former rural municipality (RM) in the Canadian province of Manitoba. It was originally incorporated as a rural municipality on December 1, 1877. It ceased on January 1, 2015 as a result of its provincially mandated amalgamation with the RM of Lakeview and the Town of Gladstone to form the Municipality of WestLake – Gladstone.

== Communities ==
- Colby
- Golden Stream
- Katrime
- Muir
- Ogilvie
- Plumas
- Westbourne
- Woodside
