= 2023 Portage—Lisgar federal by-election =

Federal by-election in Manitoba, Canada

- June 19, 2023

Riding of Portage—Lisgar
- Turnout: 45.47%
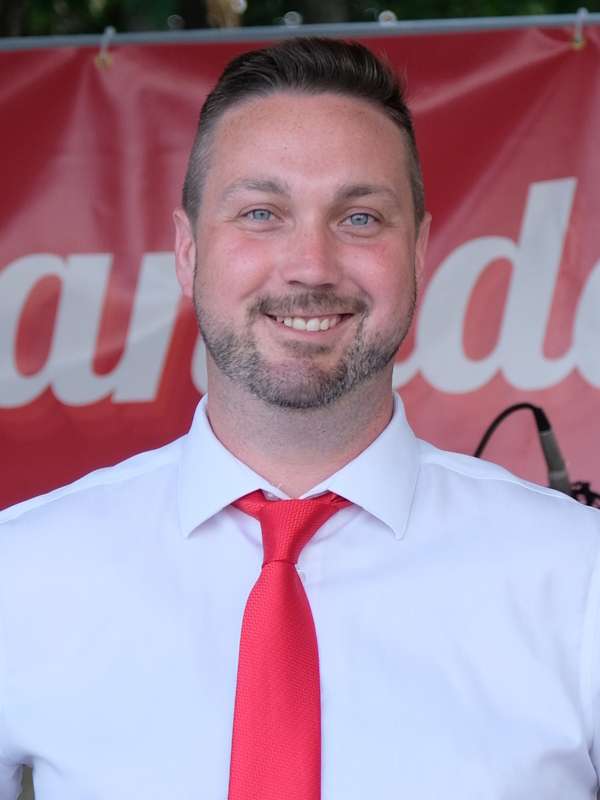

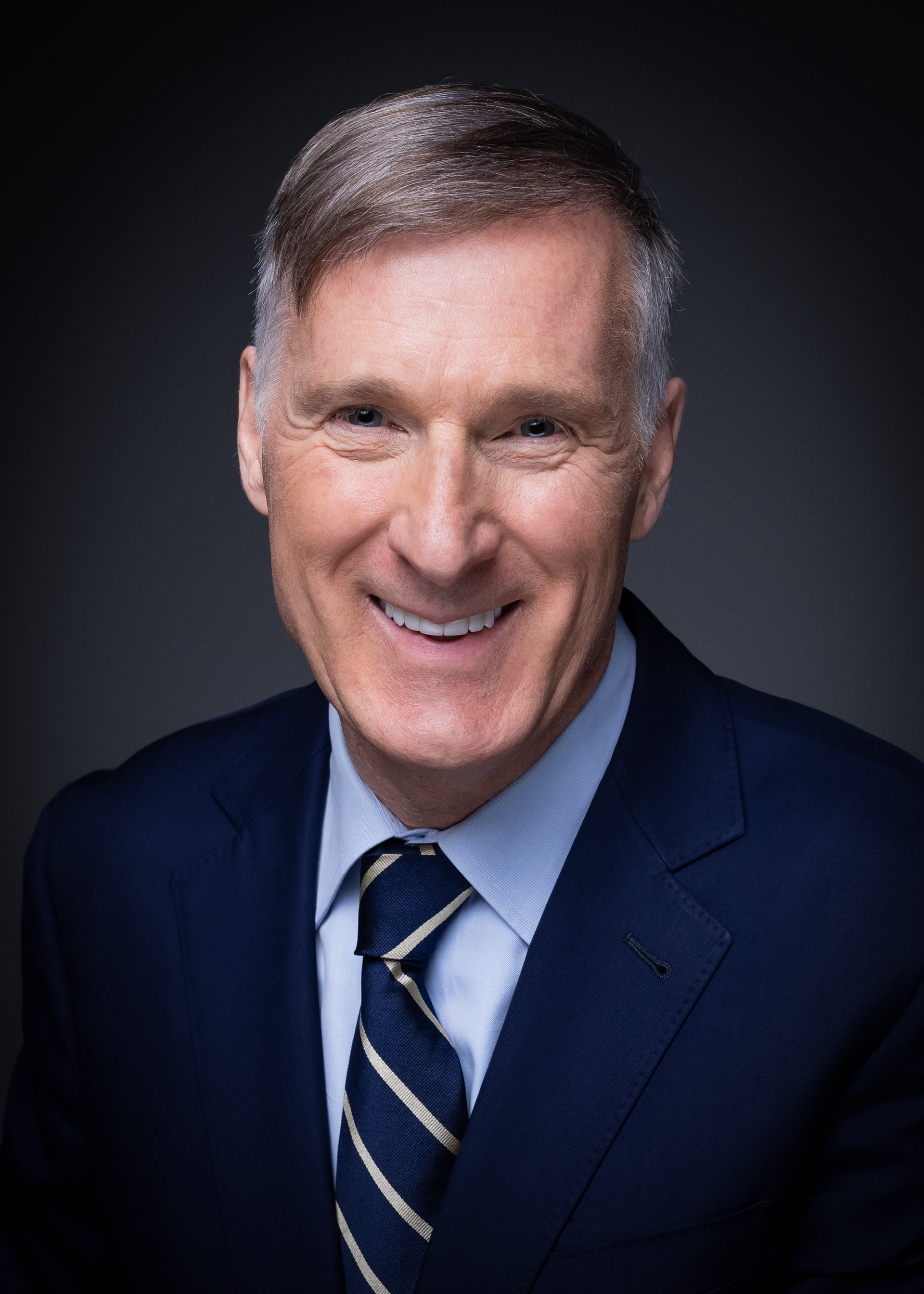
	First party	Second party
Candidate	Branden Leslie	Maxime Bernier
Party	Conservative	People's
Popular vote	20,250	5,352
Percentage	64.95%	17.16%
Swing	▲12.43%	▼4.42
	Third party	Fourth party
	LPC	NDP
Candidate	Kerry Smith	Lisa Tessier-Burch
Party	Liberal	New Democratic
Popular vote	2,666	2,208
Percentage	8.55%	7.08%
Swing	▼2.40%	▼6.30%
MP before election
Candice Bergen
Conservative
Elected MP
Branden Leslie
Conservative

A by-election was held in the federal riding of Portage—Lisgar in Manitoba, Canada on June 19, 2023, following the resignation of Conservative MP Candice Bergen.

The by-election was held on the same day as three others; Notre-Dame-de-Grâce—Westmount, Oxford and Winnipeg South Centre. It resulted in the landslide victory of Conservative Branden Leslie, in what many analysts described as a test for both the Tories and Maxime Bernier's People's Party of Canada, the latter of which got 21% of the vote in this riding in 2021, their best nationwide. After the by-election, Bernier announced his intentions to run in the riding again in the next federal election, though acknowledging that the result had not been desirable for him. In 2025, Bernier announced that he would instead contest the Quebec riding of Beauce where he previously served as MP until 2019.

== Background ==
=== Constituency ===
Portage—Lisgar is a large rural constituency in Southern Manitoba. It includes the cities of Portage la Prairie, Winkler, and Morden, and the towns of Carman, Morris and Altona. Lisgar is named after John Young, 1st Baron Lisgar who was Canadas 2nd Governor General from 1869 to 1872. The riding has voted for centre-right parties since its inception in 1997.

=== Representation ===
The riding of Portage—Lisgar was vacated on February 28, 2023, following the resignation of Conservative MP Candice Bergen. Bergen, a cabinet minister in the government of Stephen Harper and the interim leader of the Conservative Party and Leader of the Opposition from February to September 2022, had held the seat since 2008.

== Candidates ==
=== Conservative ===
Bergen's former campaign manager Branden Leslie defeated Rejeanne Caron, the party's 2019 candidate in Saint Boniface—Saint Vital and 2021 candidate in Elmwood—Transcona; Winkler resident Don Cruickshank, Morden-Winkler MLA and former Progressive Conservative Party of Manitoba cabinet minister Cameron Friesen; and Lawrence Toet, the MP for Elmwood—Transcona from 2011 to 2015 for the Conservative nomination. Liz Reimer, a Progressive Conservative Party of Manitoba staffer and former assistant to Friesen, and Josh Okello were previously running for the nomination, however after Friesen announced his campaign they withdrew their bids in order to run for the Progressive Conservative nomination in Morden-Winkler. Laurence Toet was endorsed by the constituency's former MP Charles Mayer.

=== Others ===
Maxime Bernier, the former MP for Beauce and the current leader of the People's Party of Canada, announced on May 12, 2023, that he would run for the seat.

The Liberals announced Kerry Smith as their candidate on May 13. She is the senior director of the Manitoba Métis Foundation.

The New Democratic Party announced their candidate as teacher Lisa Tessier-Burch.

The Green Party of Manitoba selected Nicolas Geddert, a community organizer and volunteer as their candidate. He was an unsuccessful candidate for leader of the Green Party of Manitoba in early 2023. In 2022, he was the candidate in the Fort Whyte by-election.

=== Polling ===
Polling firm	Last date of polling	Link	CPC	PPC	LPC	NDP	GPC	Others	Undecided	Margin of error^{[1]}	Sample size^{[2]}	Polling method^{[3]}
Mainstreet Research	June 14, 2023	HTML	41	26	14	9	4	2	3	±5.2 pp	362	IVR
Mainstreet Research	June 14, 2023	HTML	43	27	15	10	4	2	—N/a	±5.2 pp	362	IVR

== Results ==
Canadian federal by-election, June 19, 2023: Portage—Lisgar Resignation of Candice Bergen
Party	Candidate	Votes	%	±%
Conservative	Branden Leslie	20,250	64.95	+12.43
People's	Max Bernier	5,352	17.16	−4.42
Liberal	Kerry Smith	2,666	8.55	−2.40
New Democratic	Lisa Tessier-Burch	2,208	7.08	−6.30
Green	Nicolas Geddert	704	2.26	–
Total valid votes		31,180	99.40	
Total rejected ballots		188	0.60	−0.15
Turnout		31,368	45.47	−20.77
Eligible voters		68,988		
Conservative hold		Swing		+8.42
Source: Elections Canada

== 2021 result ==
2021 Canadian federal election: Portage—Lisgar
Party	Candidate	Votes	%	±%	Expenditures
Conservative	Candice Bergen	23,819	52.52	–18.28	$75,005.66
People's	Solomon Wiebe	9,790	21.58	+18.97	$12,104.29
New Democratic	Ken Friesen	6,068	13.38	+4.70	$2,822.40
Liberal	Andrew Carrier	4,967	10.95	+0.24	$14,348.06
Christian Heritage	Jerome Dondo	712	1.57	–0.36	$7,509.16
Total valid votes/expense limit		45,356	99.25	–	$111,667.24
Total rejected ballots		341	0.75	+0.13	
Turnout		45,697	66.24	–0.40	
Eligible voters		68,991			
Conservative hold		Swing		–18.62	
Source: Elections Canada
