= Candice Bergen (politician) =

Canadian politician (born 1964)

The Honourable Candice Bergen PC
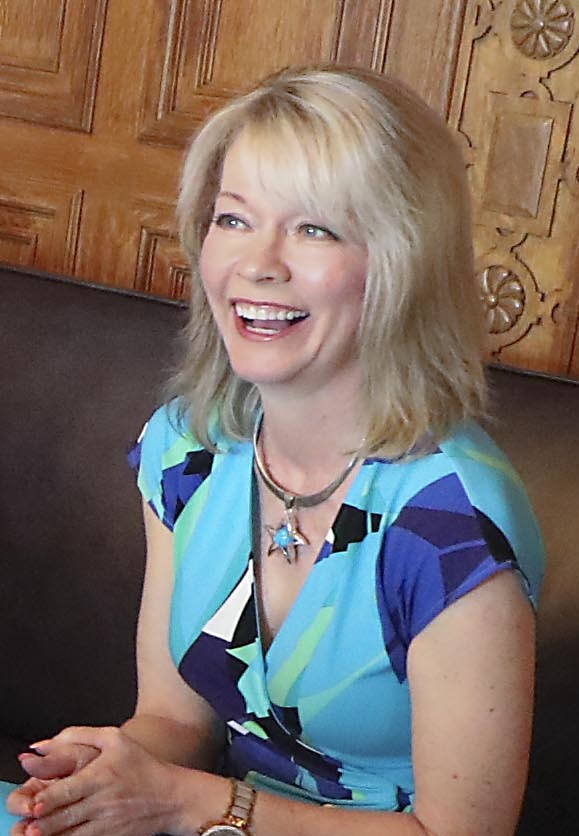
- Bergen in 2017

Leader of the Opposition
- In office February 2, 2022 – September 10, 2022
- Deputy: Luc Berthold
- Preceded by: Erin O'Toole
- Succeeded by: Pierre Poilievre

Interim leader of the Conservative Party
- In office February 2, 2022 – September 10, 2022
- Deputy: Luc Berthold
- Preceded by: Erin O'Toole
- Succeeded by: Pierre Poilievre
Senior political offices
Deputy Leader of the Opposition
In office September 2, 2020 – February 2, 2022
Leader	Erin O'Toole
Preceded by	Leona Alleslev
Succeeded by	Luc Berthold
Deputy Leader of the Conservative Party
In office September 2, 2020 – February 2, 2022
President	Scott Lamb; Robert Batherson
Leader	Erin O'Toole
Preceded by	Leona Alleslev
Succeeded by	Luc Berthold
Opposition House Leader
In office September 15, 2016 – September 2, 2020
Leader	Rona Ambrose; Andrew Scheer
Preceded by	Andrew Scheer
Succeeded by	Gérard Deltell
Ministerial positions
Minister of State for Social Development
In office July 15, 2013 – November 4, 2015
Prime Minister	Stephen Harper
Minister	Jason Kenney; Pierre Poilievre
Preceded by	Position established
Succeeded by	Position abolished
Parliamentary Secretary
Parliamentary Secretary to the Minister of Public Safety
In office May 25, 2011 – July 14, 2013
Prime Minister	Stephen Harper
Minister	Vic Toews
Preceded by	Dave MacKenzie
Succeeded by	Roxanne James

Chair of the Standing Committee on Human Resources
- In office March 8, 2010 – June 20, 2011
- Minister: Diane Finley
- Preceded by: Dean Allison
- Succeeded by: Ed Komarnicki

Member of Parliament for Portage—Lisgar
- In office October 14, 2008 – February 28, 2023
- Preceded by: Brian Pallister
- Succeeded by: Branden Leslie

Shadow cabinet posts
- 2015–2016: Shadow Minister of Natural Resources

Personal details
- Born: Candice Marie Bergen; September 28, 1964 (age 62) Morden, Manitoba, Canada
- Party: Conservative
- Other political affiliations: Progressive Conservative Party of Manitoba
- Spouses: David Hoeppner (m. 1986; div. c. 2011); Michael Harris (m. 2020)
- Children: 3
- Profession: Politician
- Website: candicebergen.ca

Candice Marie Bergen Harris PC (née Bergen, previously Hoeppner; born September 28, 1964) is a Canadian politician who served as the member of Parliament (MP) for Portage—Lisgar in Manitoba from 2008 to 2023. She served as the interim leader of the Conservative Party and the leader of the Opposition from February 2, 2022 to September 10, 2022.

Bergen was minister of State for Social Development in the Harper government and Opposition House Leader under Rona Ambrose and Andrew Scheer from 2016 until 2020. She served as deputy leader of the Conservative Party and deputy leader of the Opposition under Erin O'Toole from September 2020 to February 2022.

On September 6, 2022, she announced she would not be standing at the next federal election, and resigned her seat on February 28, 2023. The by-election to replace her in parliament was held on June 19, 2023. She was succeeded by her former campaign manager, Branden Leslie.

== Background ==
Bergen was born on September 28, 1964, in Morden, Manitoba, to a family with Mennonite roots and attended a Pentecostal church. She was the youngest of eight siblings. Her father sold car parts and her mother was a cleaner in a hospital. After high school, Bergen moved to Winnipeg and British Columbia, but returned home to Morden to raise her children and worked to help support her husband through university.

== Federal politics ==
Bergen became involved in politics because of frustration with the Canadian federal government, including what she perceived as wasteful spending. She began volunteering for the Canadian Alliance's local riding association.

In 2004, she was the Manitoba campaign manager for Stephen Harper's leadership bid for the Conservative Party of Canada.

=== Government backbencher ===
On October 14, 2008, Bergen, under her then-married name Candice Hoeppner, was elected to represent Portage—Lisgar in the 2008 Canadian federal election.

On November 19, 2008, Bergen introduced the motion in the House of Commons to accept the speech from the throne (the traditional speech in which the governor general outlines the government's agenda at the start of a new session of Parliament). In fall 2011, Bergen was given the opportunity to chair a panel of MPs (one from each recognized party) for the selection of Supreme Court judges. Bergen was also a member of the legislative committee studying the controversial Bill C-18, an omnibus bill that would purportedly give marketing freedom to western grain farmers. Some farmers claim that the bill has had negative effects on the grain farmers it claimed to benefit.

Previously, Bergen served as chair of the Standing Committee on Human Resources, Skills and Social Development and the Status of Persons with Disabilities. She was the vice-chair of the Standing Committee for the Status of Women and sat on the Standing Committee for Transport, Infrastructure and Communities. Additionally, she has been a member of the Liaison Committee as well as the Panel of Legislative Committee Chairs.

Bergen was involved in several special parliamentary groups. She was on the executive on the Canada-Japan Inter-Parliamentary Group. She is also the former chair of the Canada-Australia-New Zealand Parliamentary Friendship Group, in addition to sitting on a number of other parliamentary groups.

On May 15, 2009, Bergen introduced bill C-391, An Act to Amend the Criminal Code and the Firearms Act, which would have repealed the long-gun registry. On November 4, 2009, bill C-391 passed second reading in the House of Commons by a vote of 164 to 137. On September 22, 2010, a Liberal motion to kill debate on bill C-391 was passed 153–151, after six NDP MPs who backed Bergen's bill changed their votes, along with several Liberal MPs, enough to ensure the passage of the motion, keeping the registry alive.

=== Parliamentary secretary and cabinet minister ===
On May 2, 2011, at the 41st Canadian general election, Bergen was returned as Member of Parliament for Portage—Lisgar with 76.0 per cent of the vote. On May 25, 2011, Bergen was appointed as the parliamentary secretary to the minister of public safety. In her role as parliamentary secretary, Bergen had the opportunity to work alongside the Minister of Public Safety on bill C-19, Ending the Long Gun Registry Act which became law on April 5, 2012.

On July 15, 2013, Bergen was appointed Minister of State for Social Development.

=== In opposition ===
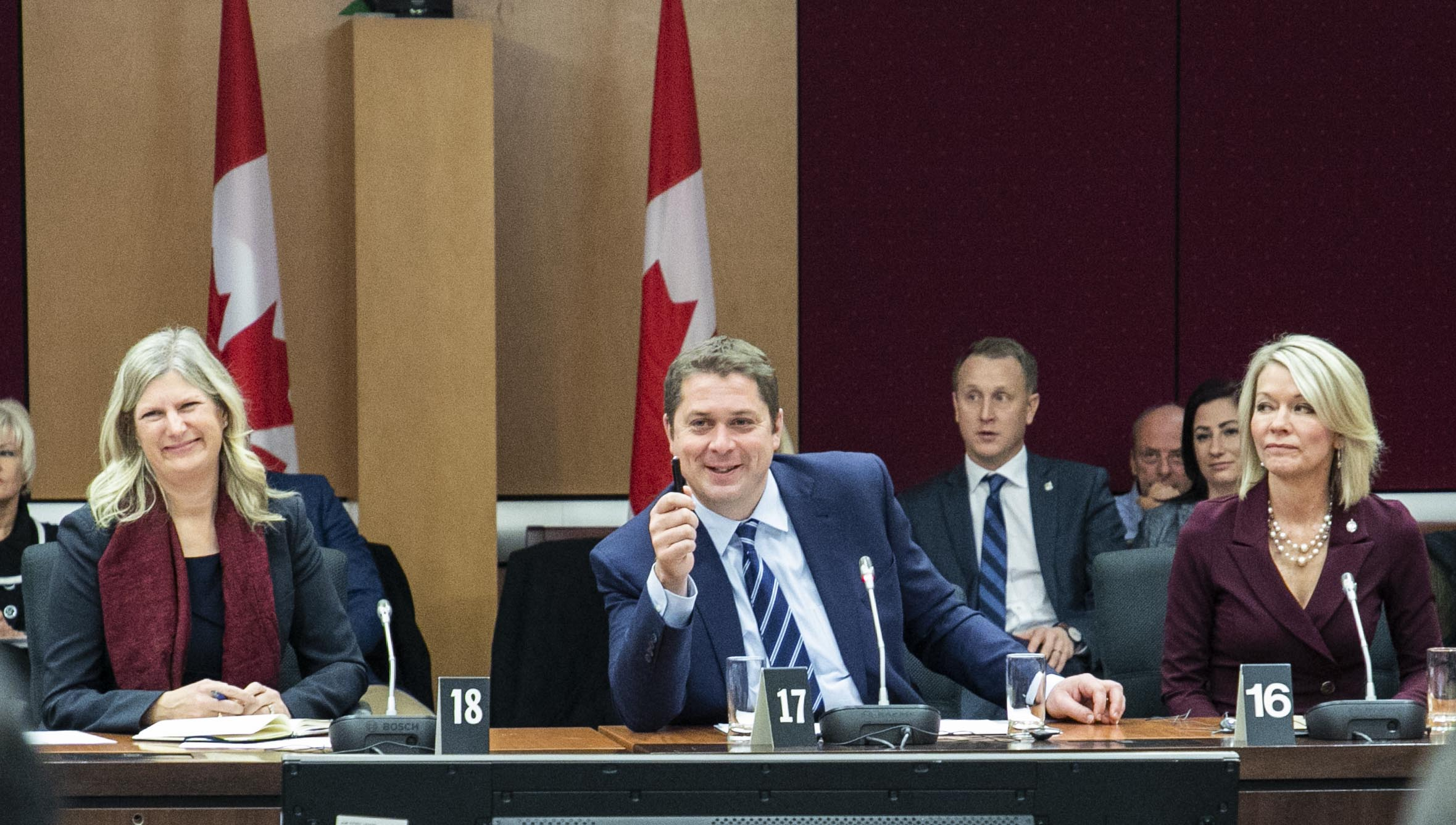
Bergen (right) with Leona Alleslev and Andrew Scheer in 2019

After Stephen Harper resigned as Conservative leader after the party became the Official Opposition after the 2015 election, Bergen, who was re-elected, announced that she would run for the interim leadership. Rona Ambrose was chosen instead.

In opposition, she served as the Official Opposition critic for Natural Resources from November 20, 2015, to September 15, 2016.

Bergen was appointed by Interim Conservative leader, Rona Ambrose as Opposition House Leader on September 15, 2016, replacing Andrew Scheer.

In 2018, Bergen criticized Justin Trudeau and the Liberal government during the Question Period after not ordering law enforcement to arrest Abu Huzaifa al-Kanadi after admitting to be a member of the Islamic State group. She also called on Public Safety Minister Ralph Goodale to reveal whether the government knows where he is or not, but Goodale stated that it was the "opposition of keeping Canadians safe".

She was re-elected in the 2019 federal election. She considered running in the 2020 Conservative Party of Canada leadership election to succeed Andrew Scheer, but decided not to because of her lack of fluency in French.

In 2020, she called for the re-establishment of the Office of Religious Freedom in Canada to address the forced conversion of minority girls in Pakistan.

In September 2020, Bergen was appointed Deputy Leader of the Opposition by Erin O'Toole. She was succeeded as Opposition House Leader by Gérard Deltell.

On January 7, 2021, an undated photo of Bergen apparently wearing a camouflage MAGA hat began circulating on social media. In response, Bergen denounced the 2021 storming of the United States Capitol but did not deny that she was depicted in the picture.

On January 31, 2022, Bergen advised senior Conservative MPs not to tell members of the Ottawa Protests to leave the city. In an email she told members that, "we need to turn this into the [Prime Minister's] problem" by portraying Trudeau as unwilling to take steps such as meeting protestors to defuse the situation. Bergen also argued that there are "good people on both sides". The same day, fellow Conservative MP Marilyn Gladu posted a picture of Bergen and herself meeting with protestors in a downtown Ottawa restaurant.

On February 2, 2022, Erin O'Toole was removed as leader in a vote by Conservative MPs according to the terms of the Reform Act. The vote occurred by secret ballot. The vote ousted him as leader, which took effect immediately. Following O'Toole's removal, a second vote of Conservative MPs took place on the same day to appoint an interim party leader pursuant to the Reform Act. Bergen was elected as the interim leader of the Conservative Party by the Conservative caucus, and became the Leader of the Official Opposition.

During the Public Order Emergency Commission, Trudeau's chief of staff and three other staffers said that Bergen had "acknowledged that there were significant concerns about whom the federal government could engage with and setting a bad precedent." on a February 3 phone call with Trudeau to see if she could engage protest leadership. As the protests went on, Bergen publicly called for an end to the protests.

On February 6, 2022, Bergen appointed Mégantic—L'Érable MP Luc Berthold as the party's deputy leader and Quebec lieutenant.

On September 6, 2022, she announced she would not be standing at the next federal election. On September 10, 2022, it was announced that MP Pierre Poilievre was elected as her successor in the 2022 leadership election. On February 1, 2023, Bergen announced that she had submitted her letter of resignation and would be stepping down as an MP.

== After federal politics ==
In March 2023, Bergen became campaign co-chair for the Progressive Conservative Party of Manitoba for the 2023 Manitoba general election.

In 2026, she also joined the strategic advisory firm Signal Hill as a Senior Advisor.

== Political positions ==
Politically, Bergen has been defined as both a social conservative and a moderate with a profile in Maclean's describing her as having an appeal to both wings of the Conservative Party of Canada. In her personal beliefs, she has expressed opposition to big government and stated that concerns for rural issues and national debt incurred by Liberal governments motivated her involvement in politics. In a 2021 interview with The Globe and Mail, Bergen stated that she considered running in the 2020 Conservative Party of Canada leadership election but decided not to citing her lack of fluency in French.

Bergen is anti-abortion. Bergen voted in support of Bill C-233 - an act to amend the Criminal Code (sex-selective abortion), which would make it an indictable or a summary offence for a medical practitioner to knowingly perform an abortion solely on the grounds of the child's genetic sex.

Bergen voted against a bill aimed at banning conversion therapy in Canada, justifying her vote by saying she had concerns with the bill's wording. In 2016, she supported the motion to amend the Conservative Party's constitution to remove the "traditional definition" of marriage from the party's policy book and support same-sex marriage.

== Personal life ==
Bergen married David Hoeppner in 1986 and took his name, running as Candice Hoeppner. They had three children together, and as of January 2021, two grandchildren. After separating in 2011, Bergen announced in the House of Commons on September 17, 2012, that she would resume using her birth name. On October 11, 2020, Bergen married Michael Harris, a retired Winnipeg high school teacher; sharing photos of their wedding on social media, Bergen said she "married my love and best friend Michael."

== Election results ==
2021 Canadian federal election: Portage—Lisgar
Party	Candidate	Votes	%	±%	Expenditures
Conservative	Candice Bergen	23,819	52.52	–18.28	$75,005.66
People's	Solomon Wiebe	9,790	21.58	+18.97	$12,104.29
New Democratic	Ken Friesen	6,068	13.38	+4.70	$2,822.40
Liberal	Andrew Carrier	4,967	10.95	+0.24	$14,348.06
Christian Heritage	Jerome Dondo	712	1.57	–0.36	$7,509.16
Total valid votes/expense limit		45,356	99.25	–	$111,667.24
Total rejected ballots		341	0.75	+0.13	
Turnout		45,697	66.24	–0.40	
Eligible voters		68,991			
Conservative hold		Swing		–18.62	
Source: Elections Canada

2019 Canadian federal election: Portage—Lisgar
Party	Candidate	Votes	%	±%	Expenditures
Conservative	Candice Bergen	31,600	70.79	+9.95	$60,166.75
Liberal	Ken Werbiski	4,779	10.71	−15.08	$18,673.74
New Democratic	Cindy Friesen	3,872	8.67	+2.47	$0.00
Green	Beverley Eert	2,356	5.28	+1.30	$6,945.06
People's	Aaron Archer	1,169	2.62		$1,048.91
Christian Heritage	Jerome Dondo	860	1.93	−1.27	$21,830.60
Total valid votes/expense limit		44,636	99.39		
Total rejected ballots		275	0.61	+0.23	
Turnout		44,911	68.64	+1.19	
Eligible voters		67,397			
Conservative hold		Swing		+12.52	
Source: Elections Canada

2015 Canadian federal election: Portage—Lisgar
Party	Candidate	Votes	%	±%	Expenditures
Conservative	Candice Bergen	25,060	60.84	−14.95	$91,365.21
Liberal	Ken Werbiski	10,621	25.79	+19.81	$12,481.25
New Democratic	Dean Harder	2,554	6.20	−4.01	$7,315.22
Green	Bev Eert	1,637	3.97	−1.67	$7,832.39
Christian Heritage	Jerome Dondo	1,315	3.19		$20,134.89
Total valid votes/expense limit		41,187	99.62		$208,924.52
Total rejected ballots		159	0.38	–	
Turnout		41,346	65.44	–	
Eligible voters		63,180			
Conservative hold		Swing		−17.38	
Source: Elections Canada

^ Change is from redistributed results

2011 Canadian federal election: Portage—Lisgar
Party	Candidate	Votes	%	±%	Expenditures
Conservative	Candice Hoeppner	26,899	75.99	+7.72	–
New Democratic	Mohamed Alli	3,478	9.83	+2.54	–
Liberal	MJ Willard	2,221	6.27	−7.28	–
Green	Matthew Friesen	1,996	5.64	−2.43	–
Christian Heritage	Jerome Dondo	805	2.27	−0.55	–
Total valid votes/expense limit		35,399	99.59		–
Total rejected ballots		147	0.41	+0.06	
Turnout		35,546	59.44	+5.67	
Eligible voters		59,799	–	–	
Conservative hold		Swing		+2.59	

2008 Canadian federal election: Portage—Lisgar
Party	Candidate	Votes	%	±%	Expenditures
Conservative	Candice Hoeppner	22,036	68.27	−1.52	$57,186
Liberal	Ted Klassen	4,374	13.55	+2.16	$19,807
Green	Charlie Howatt	2,606	8.07	+2.97	$3,649
New Democratic	Mohamed Alli	2,353	7.29	−3.76	$2,873
Christian Heritage	Len Lodder	911	2.82	+0.14	$8,429
Total valid votes/expense limit		32,280	99.64		$83,296
Total rejected ballots		116	0.36	+0.03	
Turnout		32,396	53.77	–7.89	
Eligible voters		60,246	–	–	
Conservative hold		Swing		−1.84	
