= Hannah–Snowflake Border Crossing =

Canada–United States border crossing

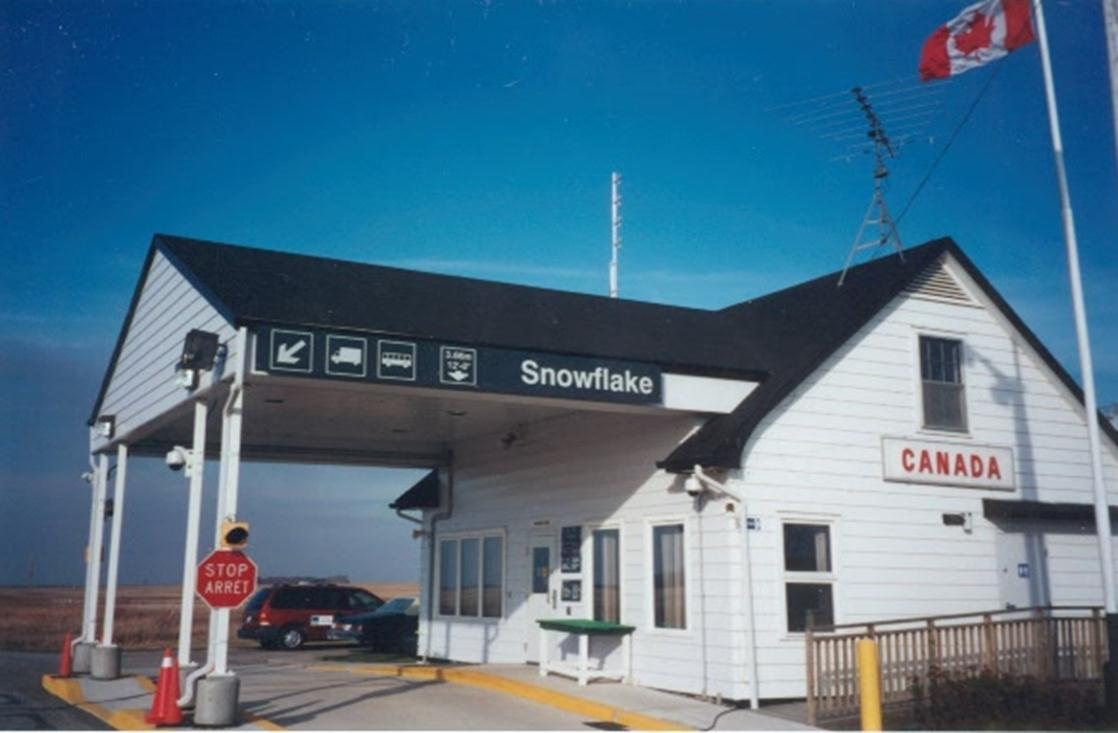
- Canada Border Station at Snowflake, MB

Locaiton
- Country: United States; Canada
- Location: PR 242 / 91st Avenue NE; US Port: 10951 91st. Ave. NE, Hannah, North Dakota; Canadian Port: Manitoba Provincial Road 242, Snowflake, Manitoba
- Coordinates: 49°N 98.694313°W

Details
- Opened: 1889; 136 years ago

Website
- http://www.cbp.gov/contact/ports/hannah

The Hannah–Snowflake Border Crossing connects the towns of Hannah, North Dakota and Snowflake, Manitoba on the Canada–United States border. It is connected by 91st Avenue NE in Cavalier County, North Dakota on the American side and Provincial Road 242 in the Municipality of Louise, Manitoba on the Canadian side.

Both Hannah and Snowflake once were thriving small farm communities, and both rapidly declined in population when their respective railroads were abandoned. The BNSF rail line now terminates in Langdon, North Dakota and Hannah's population has declined from 253 in 1960 to 15 in 2010. The population of Snowflake is now 2. Consequently, the volume of traffic that uses this border crossing has also declined. The average volume of traffic per calendar month is around 100 cars and fewer than ten trucks.

The Canada border station of Snowflake was slated to be replaced in 2017.

== See also ==
- List of Canada–United States border crossings
