= Municipality of Pembina =

Rural municipality in Manitoba, Canada

Pembina
- Rural municipality
- Municipality of Pembina
- Flag
- Motto: "People, Purpose, Progress"
- Location of the Municipality of Pembina in Manitoba

- Location of Pembina in Manitoba
- Coordinates: 49°10′39″N 98°32′27″W
- Country: Canada
- Province: Manitoba
- Region: Pembina Valley
- Incorporated (amalgamated): January 1, 2015
- Time zone: UTC-6 (CST)
  - Summer (DST): UTC-5 (CDT)
- Website: Municipality of Pembina

The Municipality of Pembina is a rural municipality (RM) in the Canadian province of Manitoba.

== History ==
The municipality was incorporated on January 1, 2015 via the amalgamation of the RM of Pembina and the Town of Manitou. It was formed as a requirement of The Municipal Amalgamations Act, which required that municipalities with a population less than 1,000 amalgamate with one or more neighbouring municipalities by 2015. The Government of Manitoba initiated these amalgamations in order for municipalities to meet the 1997 minimum population requirement of 1,000 to incorporate a municipality.

== Communities ==
- Darlingford
- Kaleida
- La Rivière
- Manitou
- Snowflake

== Demographics ==
In the 2021 Census of Population conducted by Statistics Canada, Pembina had a population of 2,406 living in 929 of its 1,002 total private dwellings, a change of 2.5% from its 2016 population of 2,347. With a land area of 1,130.57 km^{2} (436.52 sq mi), it had a population density of 2.1/km^{2} (5.5/sq mi) in 2021.

== See also ==
- Maida–Windygates Border Crossing
