= Snowflake, Manitoba =

Community in Manitoba

Snowflake
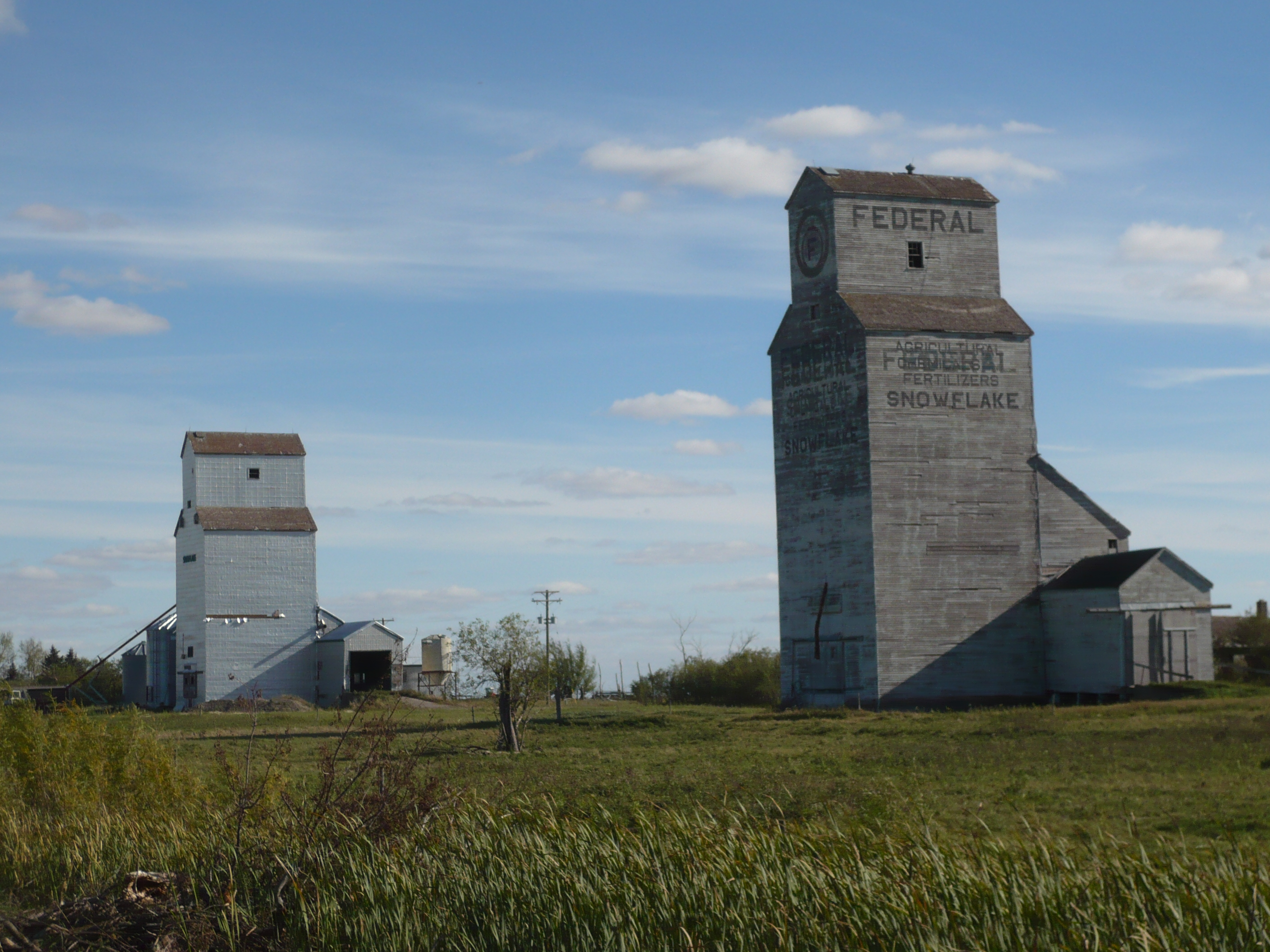
- Grain Elevators at Snowflake

- Location of Snowflake in Manitoba
- Coordinates: 49°02′51″N 98°39′33″W
- Country: Canada
- Province: Manitoba
- Region: Pembina Valley
- Census Division: No. 4

Government
  - MP: Branden Leslie
  - MLA: Lauren Stone
- Time zone: UTC−6 (CST)
  - Summer (DST): UTC−5 (CDT)
- Postal Code: R0G 2K0
- Area code: 204
- NTS Map: 062G02
- GNBC Code: GAZRS

Snowflake is a small community in the Municipality of Pembina in Manitoba, Canada near the Canada–United States border. It is the birthplace of ice hockey player Justin Falk, and was the first ecclesiastical posting for the sixth Bishop of Calgary, George Reginald Calvert.

== History ==
A customs office at the crossing into the United States opened in Mowbray, Manitoba on 1899. That was replaced by a customs office here in 1908.

== Climate ==
Climate data for Snowflake
Month	Jan	Feb	Mar	Apr	May	Jun	Jul	Aug	Sep	Oct	Nov	Dec	Year
Record high °C (°F)	5.5 (41.9)	12.0 (53.6)	17.0 (62.6)	28.0 (82.4)	33.0 (91.4)	35.5 (95.9)	34.0 (93.2)	36.5 (97.7)	36.0 (96.8)	33.0 (91.4)	21.5 (70.7)	8.0 (46.4)	36.5 (97.7)
Mean daily maximum °C (°F)	−11.0 (12.2)	−7.5 (18.5)	−1.2 (29.8)	9.6 (49.3)	17.3 (63.1)	22.1 (71.8)	24.1 (75.4)	24.5 (76.1)	19.1 (66.4)	10.1 (50.2)	0.5 (32.9)	−7.5 (18.5)	8.3 (46.9)
Daily mean °C (°F)	−15.7 (3.7)	−12.6 (9.3)	−5.9 (21.4)	4.0 (39.2)	11.0 (51.8)	16.5 (61.7)	18.8 (65.8)	18.0 (64.4)	12.7 (54.9)	4.7 (40.5)	−4.8 (23.4)	−11.8 (10.8)	2.9 (37.2)
Mean daily minimum °C (°F)	−20.4 (−4.7)	−17.3 (0.9)	−10.5 (13.1)	−1.7 (28.9)	4.7 (40.5)	10.8 (51.4)	12.8 (55.0)	11.6 (52.9)	6.3 (43.3)	−0.7 (30.7)	−9.2 (15.4)	−16.0 (3.2)	−2.5 (27.5)
Record low °C (°F)	−42.0 (−43.6)	−41.5 (−42.7)	−36.0 (−32.8)	−21.0 (−5.8)	−9.0 (15.8)	−1.0 (30.2)	3.5 (38.3)	0.0 (32.0)	−7.0 (19.4)	−21.0 (−5.8)	−28.5 (−19.3)	−35.5 (−31.9)	−42.0 (−43.6)
Average precipitation mm (inches)	25.6 (1.01)	18.5 (0.73)	31.5 (1.24)	25.4 (1.00)	72.6 (2.86)	100.5 (3.96)	82.9 (3.26)	70.8 (2.79)	45.2 (1.78)	34.4 (1.35)	28.6 (1.13)	27.6 (1.09)	563.5 (22.19)
Average rainfall mm (inches)	0.0 (0.0)	1.3 (0.05)	11.1 (0.44)	14.7 (0.58)	67.4 (2.65)	100.5 (3.96)	82.9 (3.26)	70.8 (2.79)	45.2 (1.78)	24.3 (0.96)	6.9 (0.27)	0.1 (0.00)	425.2 (16.74)
Average snowfall cm (inches)	25.6 (10.1)	17.2 (6.8)	20.4 (8.0)	10.6 (4.2)	5.2 (2.0)	0.0 (0.0)	0.0 (0.0)	0.0 (0.0)	0.0 (0.0)	10.1 (4.0)	21.7 (8.5)	27.5 (10.8)	138.3 (54.4)
Source: Environment Canada

== Notable residents ==
- Justin Falk NHL player
- LeMoine FitzGerald, Group of Seven artist

== See also ==
- Hannah–Snowflake Border Crossing
- List of regions of Manitoba
- List of rural municipalities in Manitoba
