= Branden Leslie =

Canadian politician

Branden Leslie MP
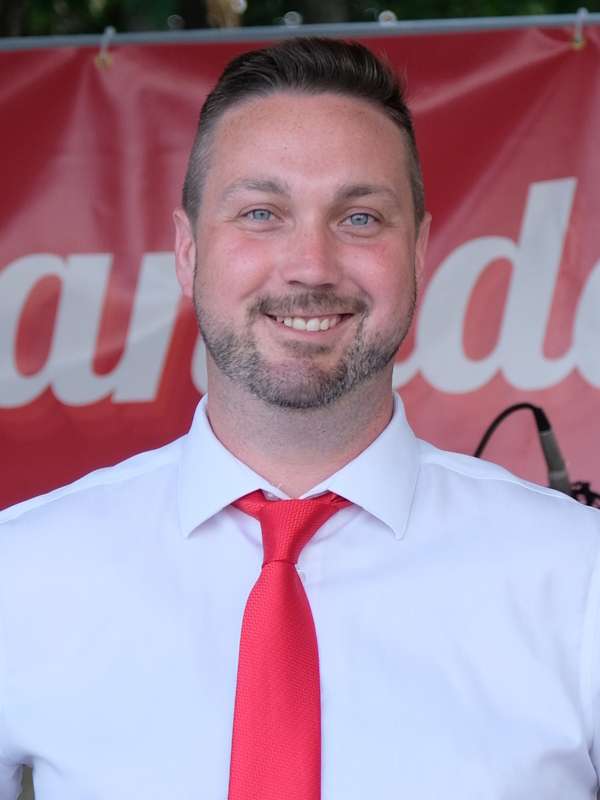
- Leslie in 2023

Member of Parliament for Portage—Lisgar
- Incumbent
- Assumed office June 19, 2023
- Preceded by: Candice Bergen

Personal details
- Born: 1989 or 1990 (age 36–37) Portage la Prairie, Manitoba, Canada
- Party: Conservative
- Education: Carleton University; Brandon University
- Profession: Manager

Branden Leslie MP is a Canadian politician who was elected to the Canadian House of Commons in a by-election on 19 June 2023. He represents Portage—Lisgar as a member of the Conservative Party of Canada. Previously, he was a former Conservative political staffer and a policy and government relations manager with Grain Growers Canada.

== Career ==
Leslie previously served as former MP Candice Bergen's campaign manager, was a former political staffer for the Conservatives and was a policy and government relations manager with Grain Growers Canada.

On January 25, 2023, Leslie announced that he was running for the Conservative nomination in Portage—Lisgar to succeed Bergen, the party’s former interim leader. On April 28, Leslie was selected by members to become the party candidate defeating prominent candidates such as former Morden-Winkler MLA and former Progressive Conservative Party of Manitoba cabinet minister Cameron Friesen and Lawrence Toet, who was the MP for Elmwood—Transcona during the 41st Canadian Parliament (2011–2015). During the race, Leslie criticized Friesen for his role as Manitoba's health minister during the COVID-19 pandemic in Manitoba, arguing that Friesen's implementation of lockdowns to slow the spread of COVID-19 were unjustified.

During the by-election, Leslie was challenged by and defeated Maxime Bernier, leader of the People's Party of Canada. Both he and Bernier were competing for the same voter base. Leslie's campaign, circulated a flyer of Bernier wearing a Pride T-shirt implying that Bernier was pro-LGBTQ rights. After being elected, Leslie was asked about the video and if he would keep those stances in parliament, Leslie said would "vote with the will of his constituents."

== Political positions ==
=== Economic policy ===
Leslie has stated opposition to Canada’s federal carbon tax, describing it as a wealth redistribution scheme that disproportionately harms rural communities, farmers and small‑business owners. He supports repeal of the existing tax and opposes proposed carbon pricing on fertilizer emissions and related measures. He supported Private Member’s Bill C‑234, which sought exemptions for farmers using grain dryers and heating livestock buildings from carbon pricing.

Leslie describes himself as a defender of “rural way of life” and Canadian family farms, drawing on his upbringing on a farm near Portage la Prairie. In Parliament he has argued that Bill C‑234 would improve farm viability and help reduce food prices for consumers.

Leslie has criticized regulatory delays and municipal permit processes for allegedly inflating new housing costs by more than $200,000 per unit. He proposes holding municipalities accountable, streamlining approvals, and converting unused federal buildings into affordable rental housing.

As opposition MP, Leslie has pledged to hold the Liberal government to account and push for conservative economic policies that reduce the cost of living, cut bureaucracy, and expand private sector growth. He supports diversifying trade beyond reliance on the U.S., particularly in light of U.S. tariffs on Canadian goods, urging the removal of interprovincial trade barriers.

=== Crime, justice and firearms ===
Leslie supports tougher bail laws and opposition to what he characterized as the Trudeau government’s “catch‑and‑release” policies. He endorses mandatory minimum sentences for serious and repeat violent offenders to enhance public safety. He has also emphasized protecting the rights of law‑abiding gun owners and opposed Liberal firearm bans.

=== Immigration and labour market ===
Leslie has described Canada’s immigration system as “broken”. He advocates for agreements with provinces to process internationally trained professionals within 60 days and to evaluate candidates based on skills rather than origin, arguing this would help alleviate labour shortages in health care, agriculture, and other sectors.

=== Social and cultural issues ===
Leslie revealed that he is pro-life and was captured on video saying that he would have voted against the ban on conversion therapy.

== Electoral results ==
2025 Canadian federal election: Portage—Lisgar
| Party | Candidate | Votes | % | ±% | Expenditures |
|---|---|---|---|---|---|
| Conservative | Branden Leslie | 31,889 | 69.38 | | |
| Liberal | Robert Kreis | 10,493 | 22.82 | | |
| New Democratic | Lisa Tessier | 2,011 | 4.38 | | |
| People's | Kevin Larson | 977 | 2.13 | | |
| Green | Janine G. Gibson | 595 | 1.29 | | |
| Total valid votes/expense limit | | 45,965 | 99.28 | | |
| Total rejected ballots | | 335 | 0.72 | | |
| Turnout | | 46,300 | 67.94 | | |
| Eligible voters | | 68,152 | | | |
Source: Elections Canada

Canadian federal by-election, June 19, 2023: Portage—Lisgar Resignation of Candice Bergen
| Party | Candidate | Votes | % | ±% |
|---|---|---|---|---|
| Conservative | Branden Leslie | 20,250 | 64.95 | +12.43 |
| People's | Max Bernier | 5,352 | 17.16 | −4.42 |
| Liberal | Kerry Smith | 2,666 | 8.55 | −2.40 |
| New Democratic | Lisa Tessier-Burch | 2,208 | 7.08 | −6.30 |
| Green | Nicolas Geddert | 704 | 2.26 | – |
| Total valid votes | | 31,180 | 99.40 | |
| Total rejected ballots | | 188 | 0.60 | −0.15 |
| Turnout | | 31,368 | 45.47 | −20.77 |
| Eligible voters | | 68,988 | | |
| Conservative hold | | Swing | | +8.42 |
Source: Elections Canada
