= Rural Municipality of Lakeview =

Lakeview
- Former rural municipality
- Rural Municipality of Lakeview
- Location within Manitoba
- Coordinates: 50°22′23″N 98°41′46″W
- Country: Canada
- Province: Manitoba
- Incorporated (RM): April 10, 1920
- Amalgamated: January 1, 2015
- Named for: Proximity to Lake Manitoba

Area
  - Total: 567.87 km^{2} (219.26 sq mi)

Population (2011)
  - Total: 311

The Rural Municipality of Lakeview was a rural municipality (RM) in the Canadian province of Manitoba.

Originally incorporated as a rural municipality on April 10, 1920, it ceased to be one on January 1, 2015, as a result of its provincially-mandated amalgamation with the RM of Westbourne and the Town of Gladstone to form the Municipality of WestLake – Gladstone.

Located on the west shore of Lake Manitoba, the municipality was named for its proximity to the lake.

== History ==
The first immigrants to the area that became the RM were from Iceland. In 1901, the Census listed 142 residents (47.8%) as having Icelandic as their mother tongue.

In 1901, the community had a total population of 658.

The Rural Municipality of Lakeview was originally incorporated on April 10, 1920. The RM's first Council was led by reeve George W. Langdon, and included Magnus Peterson, Jas. M. Birnie, John Arksey, Alf W. Law, George Hall, and Earl E. Davidson.

By 1921, the new RM's population peaked at 1607. By 2011, nearly a century later, however, the population dropped to 311—its lowest recorded population.

On January 1, 2015, Lakeview ceased to be a rural municipality as a result of new provincial legislation (The Municipal Amalgamations Act) that prompted Manitoba municipalities with populations less than 1,000—including the RM of Lakeview—to amalgamate with neighbouring municipalities. As result, the RM of Lakeview merged with the RM of Westbourne and the Town of Gladstone to form the Municipality of WestLake – Gladstone.

== Communities ==
- Lakeland
- Langruth

== Demographics ==
According to the 1901 Census records: Population: 297

World War I Enlisted: 58. World War II Enlisted: 140.

Based on data from "Langruth Along the Crocus Trail", published in 1984:

- Approx area = 240 sq miles covering 3 townships - 15, 16, 17 and ranges 8, 9, 10, and 11.
- Population: 560
- Physical: flat land and bush. Lake Manitoba to the east and Big Grass Marsh to the west. Town of Langruth is on ridge (former shore of Lake Agassiz) that is 70–80 feet above Lake Manitoba.
- Economy: mainly mixed farming and a few independent businesses in town. Per capita income averages range from $5,000 to $30,000. Employment outlook was not good.
- Organizations: United Church, Legion, Ladies Auxiliary, Elks, O.O.R.P., Women's Institute, Skating Rink Committee, Curling Rink Committee, and Hall Committee.
- School: Elementary School with 98 pupils. Part of Pine Creek School Division. High School is in Gladstone.

According to the Canada 2001 Census:

- Population: 384
- % Change (1996–2001): -5.7
- Dwellings: 259
- Area (km².): 567.87
- Density (persons per km^{2}.): 0.7
