= Mowbray, Manitoba =

Mowbray
- Unincorporated community
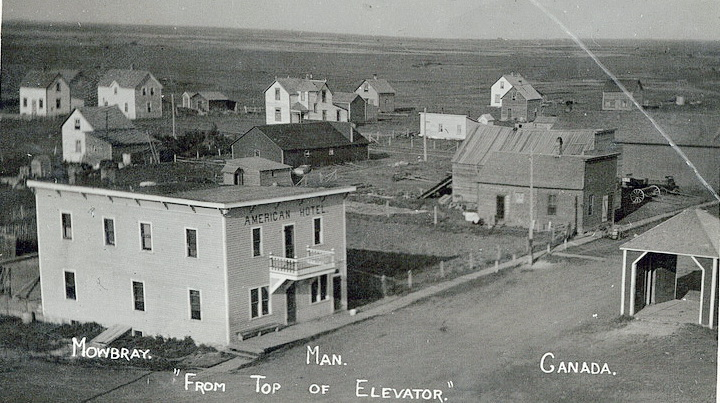
- Mowbray c. 1910

- Location within Manitoba Location within Canada
- Coordinates: 49°0′5″N 98°29′11″W
- Country: Canada
- Province: Manitoba
- Census Division: No. 4
- GNBC Code: GASGN

Mowbray is an unincorporated community in Manitoba, Canada. Located on the border with North Dakota, the settlement thrived during the early 1900s and Prohibition, but only one family lived there in the 1980s.

== History ==
Settlers from Ontario arrived to the settlement in the early 1880s.

In 1884, a post office was established, and Mowbray School was built "a mile away" from the settlement. A customs office at the crossing into the United States opened in 1899; it was replaced by a customs office in nearby Snowflake in 1908.

The Canadian Pacific Railway arrived in 1902. The settlement had a general store, a hotel, a livery and blacksmith, two grain elevators, a jail and Jackson community cemetery.

In 1906, Mowbray's school was replaced by two new ones. The first school retaining the same name and the second one-room school, named Boundary School, notably had its water and some of its students supplied from North Dakota. Residents from Mowbray regularly crossed into North Dakota to shop and sell farm produce, and the liquor business thrived during Prohibition in the United States from 1920 to 1933.

Mowbray began to decline in 1935 when railway service's frequency was reduced to one train a week. Mowbray School closed in 1956, with the Boundary School closing in c. 1960 alongside the railway being abandoned in 1963. In the 1980s, one family was living in Mowbray.

One of the community's two schools, Mowbray School, is listed as a Manitoba Provincial Heritage Site.

This has Manitoba Provincial Road 201.

== Notable people ==
James Leland Sims, born in 1905, became a member of the Legislative Assembly of Alberta.
