= Hannah, North Dakota =

- City
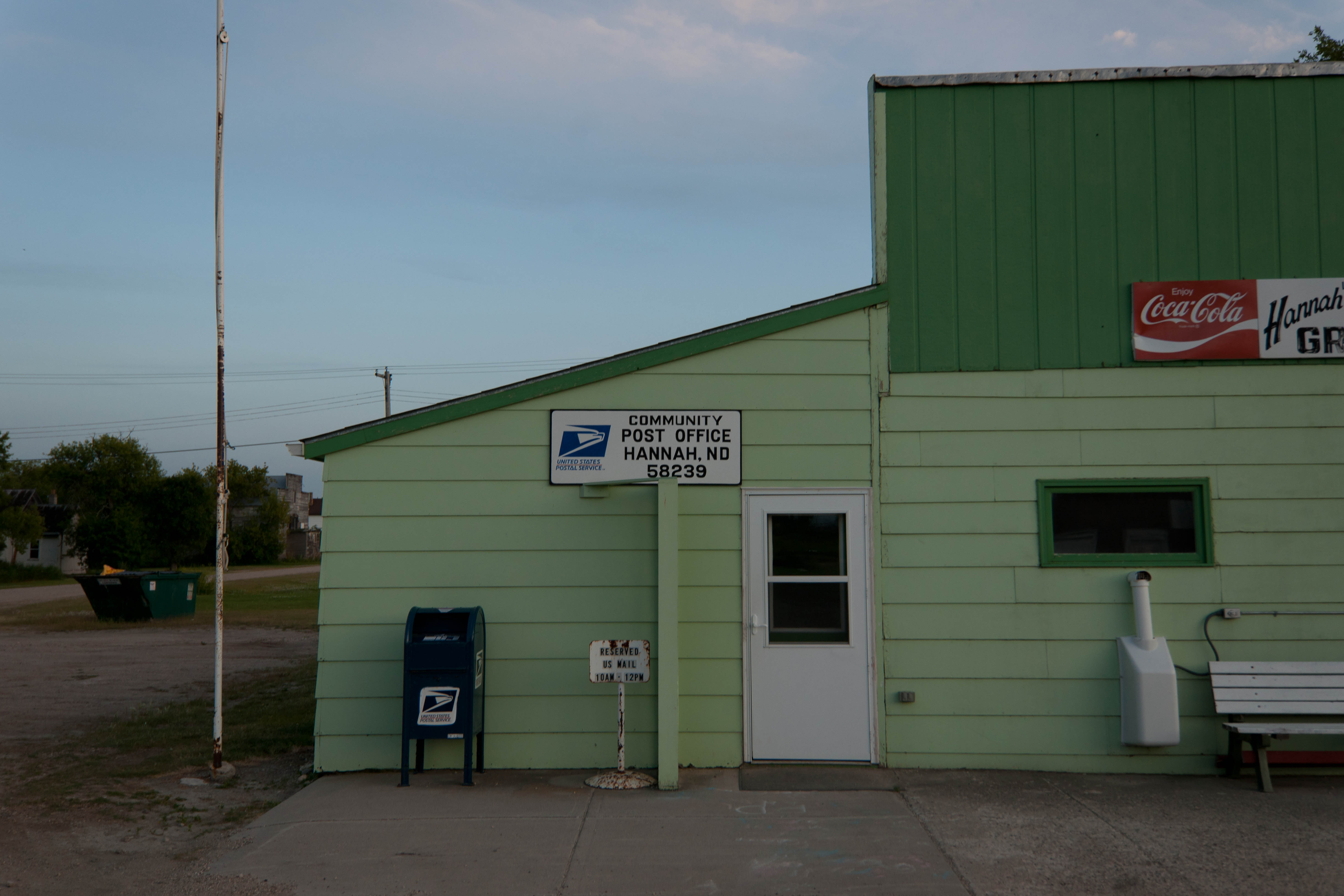
- Post office in Hannah

- Location of Hannah, North Dakota
- Coordinates: 48°58′22″N 98°41′25″W
- Country: United States
- State: North Dakota
- County: Cavalier
- Founded: 1897

Area
  - Total: 0.19 sq mi (0.49 km^{2})
  - Land: 0.19 sq mi (0.49 km^{2})
  - Water: 0 sq mi (0.00 km^{2})
- Elevation: 1,565 ft (477 m)

Population (2020)
  - Total: 8
  - Estimate (2024): 9
  - Density: 42.4/sq mi (16.38/km^{2})
- Time zone: UTC–6 (Central (CST))
  - Summer (DST): UTC–5 (CDT)
- ZIP Code: 58239
- Area code: 701
- FIPS code: 38-35060
- GNIS feature ID: 1036080

Hannah is a city in Cavalier County, North Dakota, United States. The population was 8 at the 2020 census. Hannah was founded in 1897.

== Geography ==
According to the United States Census Bureau, the city has a total area of 0.19 square miles (0.49 km^{2}), all land.

This climatic region is typified by large seasonal temperature differences, with warm to hot (and often humid) summers and cold (sometimes severely cold) winters. According to the Köppen Climate Classification system, Hannah has a humid continental climate, abbreviated "Dfb" on climate maps.

== Demographics ==
Historical population
| Census | Pop. | Note | %± |
|---|---|---|---|
| 1930 | 262 | | — |
| 1940 | 261 | | −0.4% |
| 1950 | 257 | | −1.5% |
| 1960 | 253 | | −1.6% |
| 1970 | 145 | | −42.7% |
| 1980 | 90 | | −37.9% |
| 1990 | 49 | | −45.6% |
| 2000 | 20 | | −59.2% |
| 2010 | 15 | | −25.0% |
| 2020 | 8 | | −46.7% |
| 2024 (est.) | 9 | | 12.5% |
U.S. Decennial Census; 2020 Census

=== 2010 census ===
As of the 2010 census, there were 15 people, 7 households, and 2 families living in the city. The population density was 78.9 inhabitants per square mile (30.5/km^{2}). There were 14 housing units at an average density of 73.7 per square mile (28.5/km^{2}). The racial makeup of the city was 100.0% White.

There were 7 households, of which 28.6% had children under the age of 18 living with them, 14.3% were married couples living together, 14.3% had a male householder with no wife present, and 71.4% were non-families. 71.4% of all households were made up of individuals, and 42.9% had someone living alone who was 65 years of age or older. The average household size was 2.14 and the average family size was 5.00.

The median age in the city was 29.5 years. 33.3% of residents were under the age of 18; 13.4% were between the ages of 18 and 24; 6.7% were from 25 to 44; 26.6% were from 45 to 64; and 20% were 65 years of age or older. The gender makeup of the city was 53.3% male and 46.7% female. The per capita income for the city was $17,562. There were no families and 19.2% of the population living below the poverty line, including no under eighteens and 41.7% of those over 64.

=== 2000 census ===
As of the 2000 census, there were 20 people, 13 households, and 5 families living in the city. The population density was 103.5 inhabitants per square mile (40.0/km^{2}). There were 24 housing units at an average density of 124.2 per square mile (48.0/km^{2}). 100% of residents were White.

There were 13 households, out of which one had children under the age of 18 living with them, five were married couples living together, and eight were non-families. Eight households were made up of individuals, and five had someone living alone who was 65 years of age or older. The average household size was 1.54 and the average family size was 2.40.

In the city, the population was spread out, with one person (a girl) under the age of 18, four from 25 to 44, six from 45 to 64, and nine who were 65 years of age or older. The median age was 64 years. There were nine females and eleven males.

== Economy ==
In 2020, the total value of products produced in Hannah, North Dakota was $2.92 million.

== Notable people ==
- Dorothy Adams, actress, mother of Rachel Ames
- Ethel Catherwood, Canadian track and field athlete

== See also ==
- Hannah–Snowflake Border Crossing
