= La Rivière, Manitoba =

Coordinates: 49°14′18″N 98°40′44″W

La Rivière is an unincorporated community recognized as a local urban district in Manitoba, Canada. It is located 11 km west of the town of Manitou on Highway 3. It is located in the Municipality of Pembina. La Riviere was founded 1886 by Metis Franco-Manitobans, however it is predominantly English speaking. It has a post office, credit union, a five-lift ski hill, a construction company, and a seasonal drive-in restaurant. It has a full service campground at the edge of the community that backs onto the Pembina River. La Riviere was previously home to Hamm-tone Guitars and Mandolins and the Pembina Valley Guitar Building Course.

== Demographics ==
In the 2021 Census of Population conducted by Statistics Canada, La Rivière had a population of 228 living in 110 of its 134 total private dwellings, a change of 9.6% from its 2016 population of 208. With a land area of 2.9 km^{2} (1.1 sq mi), it had a population density of 78.6/km^{2} (203.6/sq mi) in 2021.

== Gallery ==
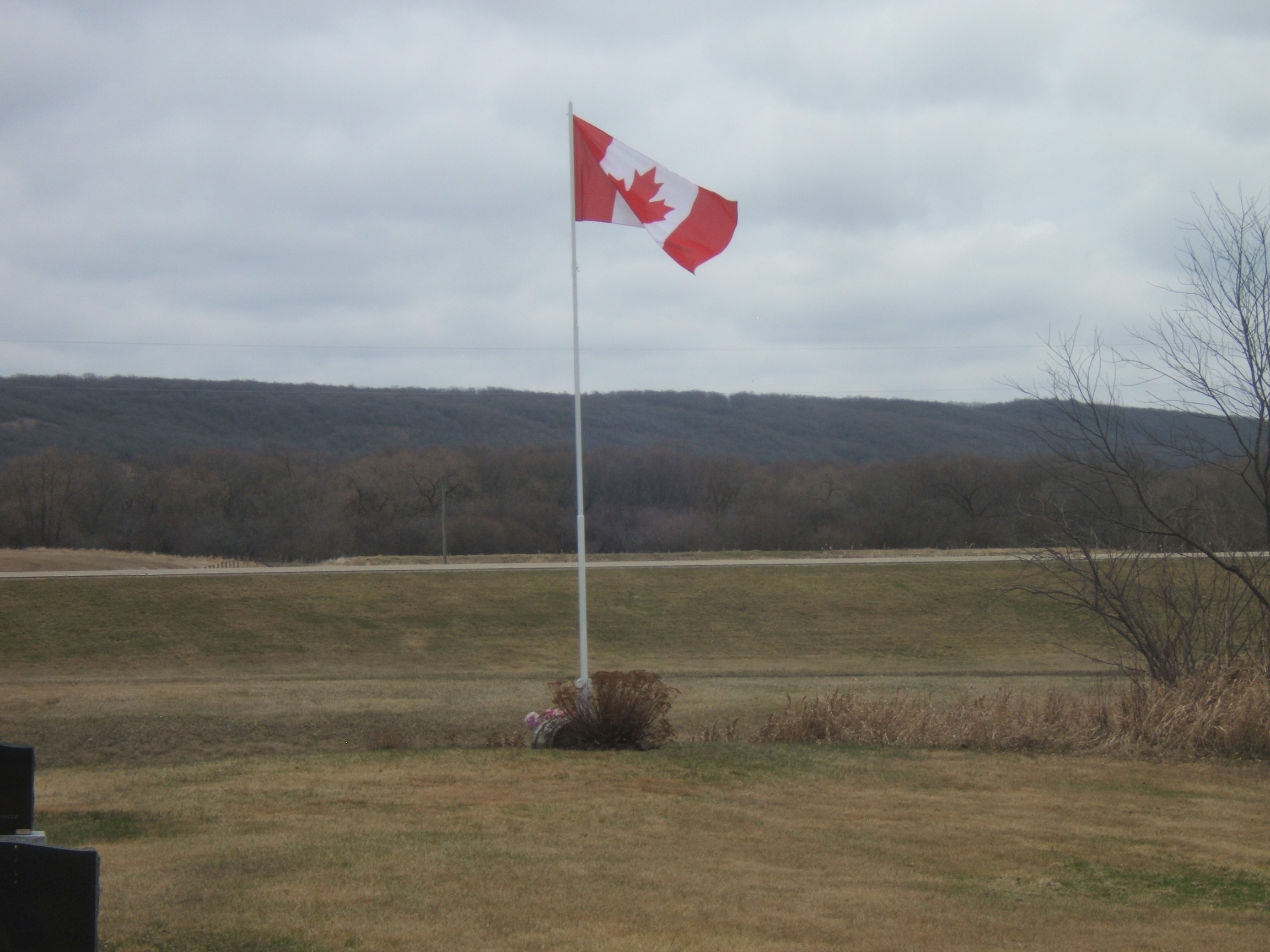
Canadian flag in La Riviere cemetery.

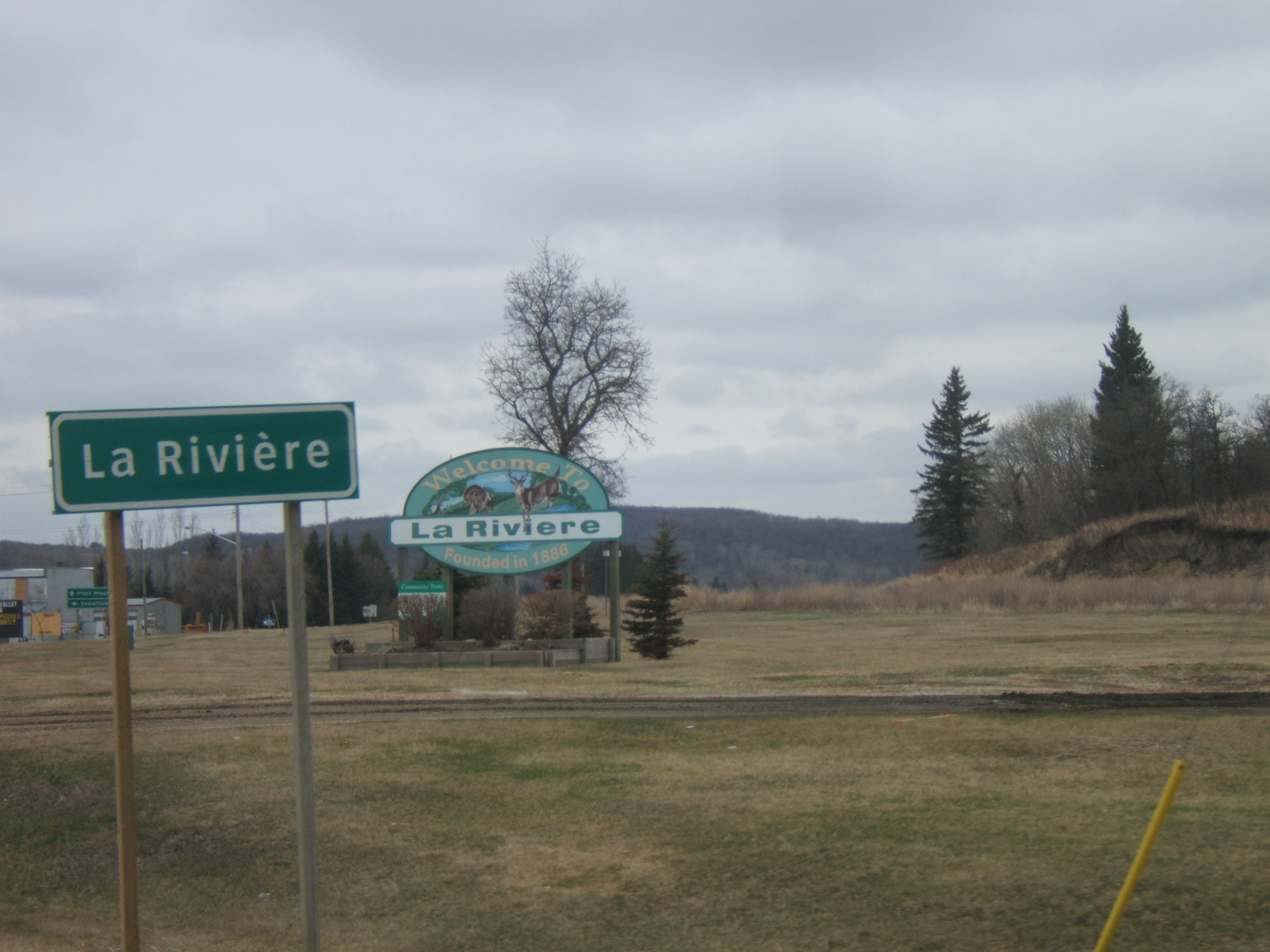
La Riviere, Manitoba welcome sign

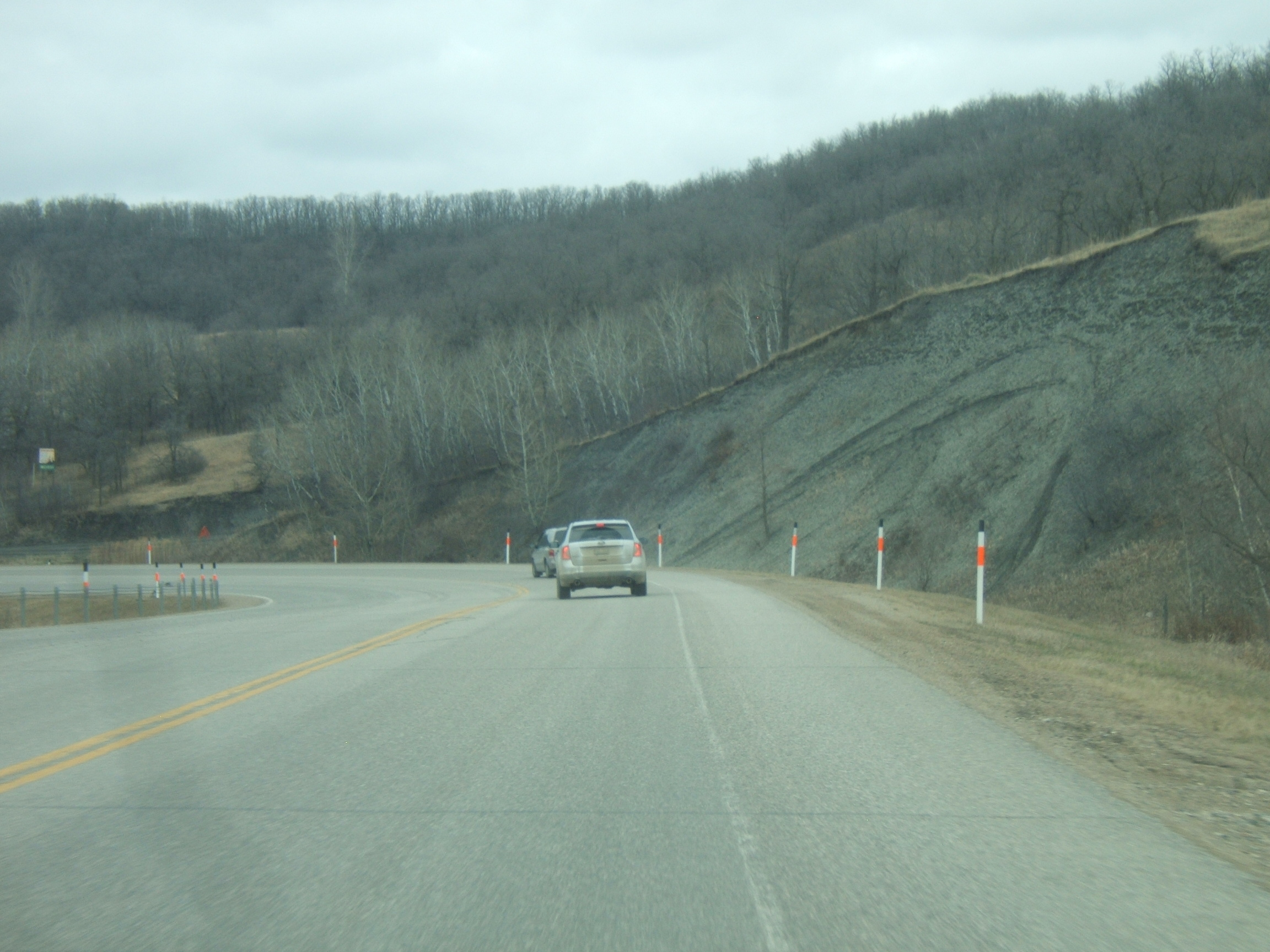
Entering the La Riviere, Manitoba river valley.

== See also ==
- List of regions of Manitoba
- List of rural municipalities in Manitoba
