= Gladstone, Manitoba =

Gladstone
- Unincorporated community
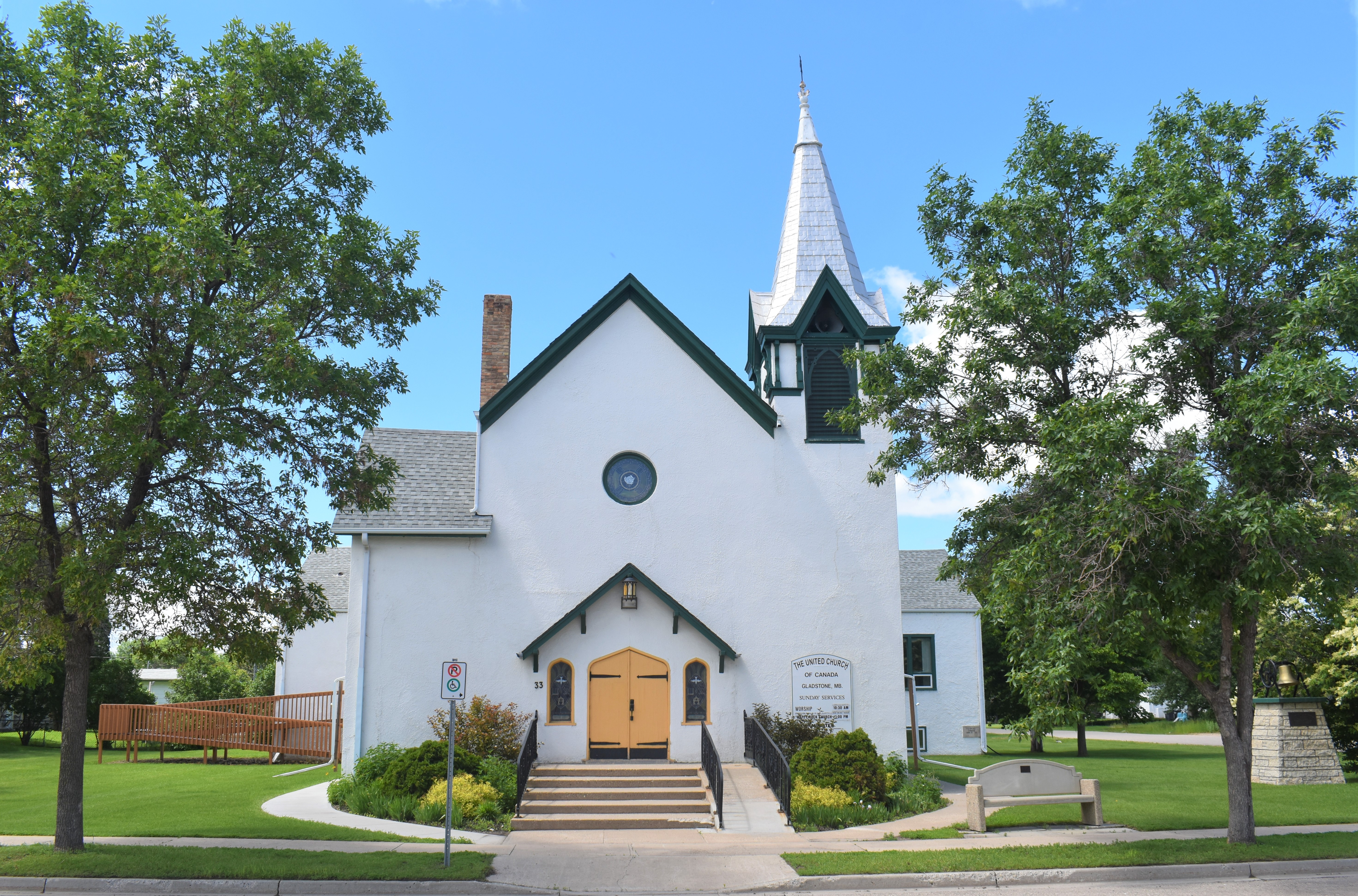
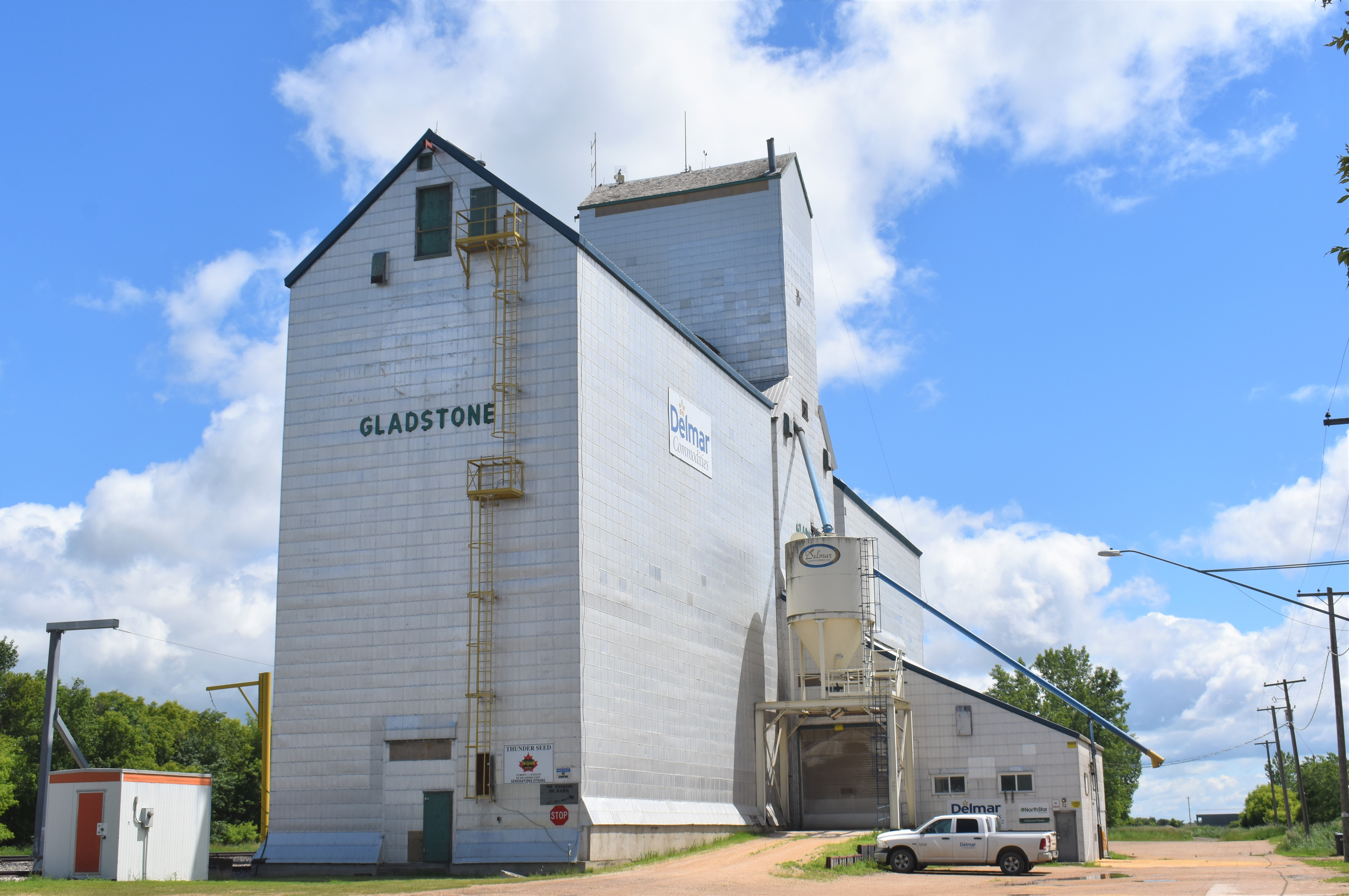
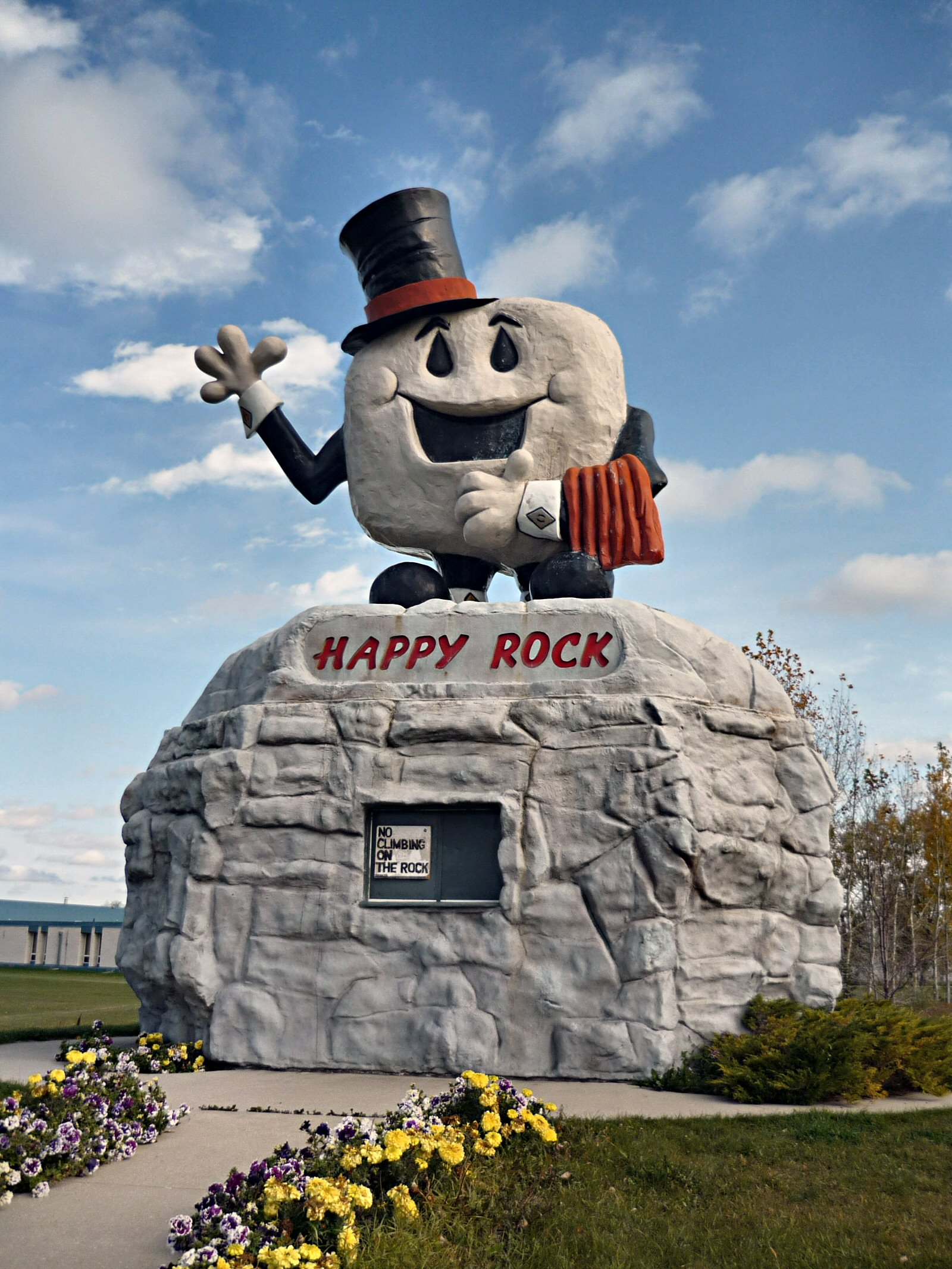
- The Gladstone United Church. The Gladstone grain elevator. The Happy Rock roadside attraction.
- Nickname: Happy Rock
- Location within Manitoba
- Coordinates: 50°13′28″N 98°57′03″W
- Country: Canada
- Province: Manitoba
- Municipality: WestLake – Gladstone

Area
  - Total: 2.40 km^{2} (0.93 sq mi)

Population (2021)
  - Total: 928
  - Density: 387/km^{2} (1,000/sq mi)

Gladstone is an unincorporated urban community in the Municipality of WestLake – Gladstone within the Canadian province of Manitoba that held town status prior to January 1, 2015. It is located on the Yellowhead Highway at the intersection with Highway 34. The Gladstone railway station receives Via Rail service.

== History ==
The first known name for the area was Third Crossing, as it was situated at the third crossing of a prairie trail over the Whitemud River. When settlement became significant in 1872 the community was renamed to Palestine.

In 1879, the community was renamed a third and final time to Gladstone, after the British Prime Minister of the time William Ewart Gladstone. On 18 July 1882, the community was incorporated as the Town of Gladstone. In 1891, Gladstone had a population of 378.

On the first day of 2015, the town amalgamated with the communities of Lakeview and Westbourne, creating the present-day Municipality of WestLake – Gladstone, of which Gladstone is now a part of as an unincorporated urban community.

== Demographics ==
In the 2021 Census of Population conducted by Statistics Canada, Gladstone had a population of 928 living in 407 of its 443 total private dwellings, a change of 4.4% from its 2016 population of 889. With a land area of 2.39 km^{2} (0.92 sq mi), it had a population density of 388.3/km^{2} (1,005.7/sq mi) in 2021.

== Happy Rock ==
Gladstone is often referred to as "Happy Rock", a play on the community's name: "happy" being another word for "glad", and "rock being another word for "stone".

This is the name given to the community's monument located along Highway 16, acting as the symbol and mascot of the community. The Happy Rock monument also acts as the visitor information centre and is a vital part of tourism in the community. On July 5, 2010, Canada Post made a commemorative stamp of the Happy Rock as part of its Roadside Attractions collection.

== Climate ==
Climate data for Gladstone
Month	Jan	Feb	Mar	Apr	May	Jun	Jul	Aug	Sep	Oct	Nov	Dec	Year
Record high °C (°F)	8 (46)	10 (50)	16.7 (62.1)	36 (97)	39 (102)	38 (100)	37 (99)	40.5 (104.9)	38.5 (101.3)	28.5 (83.3)	21.7 (71.1)	8.9 (48.0)	40.5 (104.9)
Mean daily maximum °C (°F)	−11.1 (12.0)	−8 (18)	−0.9 (30.4)	10.9 (51.6)	19.3 (66.7)	23.6 (74.5)	26.7 (80.1)	25 (77)	18.8 (65.8)	11.7 (53.1)	−0.1 (31.8)	−9 (16)	8.9 (48.0)
Daily mean °C (°F)	−16.6 (2.1)	−13.6 (7.5)	−6.4 (20.5)	4.2 (39.6)	11.9 (53.4)	16.7 (62.1)	19.6 (67.3)	17.8 (64.0)	12.1 (53.8)	5.6 (42.1)	−4.8 (23.4)	−14.1 (6.6)	2.7 (36.9)
Mean daily minimum °C (°F)	−22 (−8)	−19.3 (−2.7)	−11.9 (10.6)	−2.5 (27.5)	4.5 (40.1)	9.8 (49.6)	12.4 (54.3)	10.5 (50.9)	5.4 (41.7)	−0.5 (31.1)	−9.6 (14.7)	−19.3 (−2.7)	−3.5 (25.7)
Record low °C (°F)	−42.2 (−44.0)	−42.2 (−44.0)	−35.6 (−32.1)	−31.1 (−24.0)	−10.5 (13.1)	−1 (30)	2 (36)	0 (32)	−7.2 (19.0)	−23 (−9)	−37 (−35)	−41 (−42)	−42.2 (−44.0)
Average precipitation mm (inches)	16.9 (0.67)	15.8 (0.62)	23.4 (0.92)	31.5 (1.24)	54.7 (2.15)	71.7 (2.82)	66.3 (2.61)	72 (2.8)	55.7 (2.19)	29.8 (1.17)	19.7 (0.78)	19 (0.7)	476.3 (18.75)
Source: Environment Canada

== Railway station ==
Gladstone is served by Via Rail's Winnipeg–Churchill train.

== Notable people ==
- Doug Cash, Australian politician
- William Gordon Claxton, Canadian World War I flying ace, 37 victories in 79 days
- W. L. Morton, Canadian historian
- Andy Murray, former NHL head coach
- David Guillas, guitarist, former member of Propagandhi, currently plays in the band Agassiz
