= Westbourne, Manitoba =

Westbourne
- Location of Westbourne in Manitoba
- Coordinates: 50°7′47″N 98°34′52″W
- Country: Canada
- Province: Manitoba
- Region: Central Plains
- Census Division: No. 8

Government
  - MP: Dan Mazer
  - MLA: Jodie Byram
- Time zone: UTC−6 (CST)
  - Summer (DST): UTC−5 (CDT)
- Postal Code: R0H 1P0
- Area code: 204
- NTS Map: 062J02
- GNBC Code: GBDPH

Westbourne, Manitoba is an unincorporated community northwest of Portage la Prairie, Manitoba, Canada on the Yellowhead Highway. It is part of the Municipality of WestLake – Gladstone. The post office was opened in 1871 as White Mud River and became Westbourne in 1873.
