= Big Easel =

Installation art piece

Coordinates: 23°31′24″S 148°09′23″E

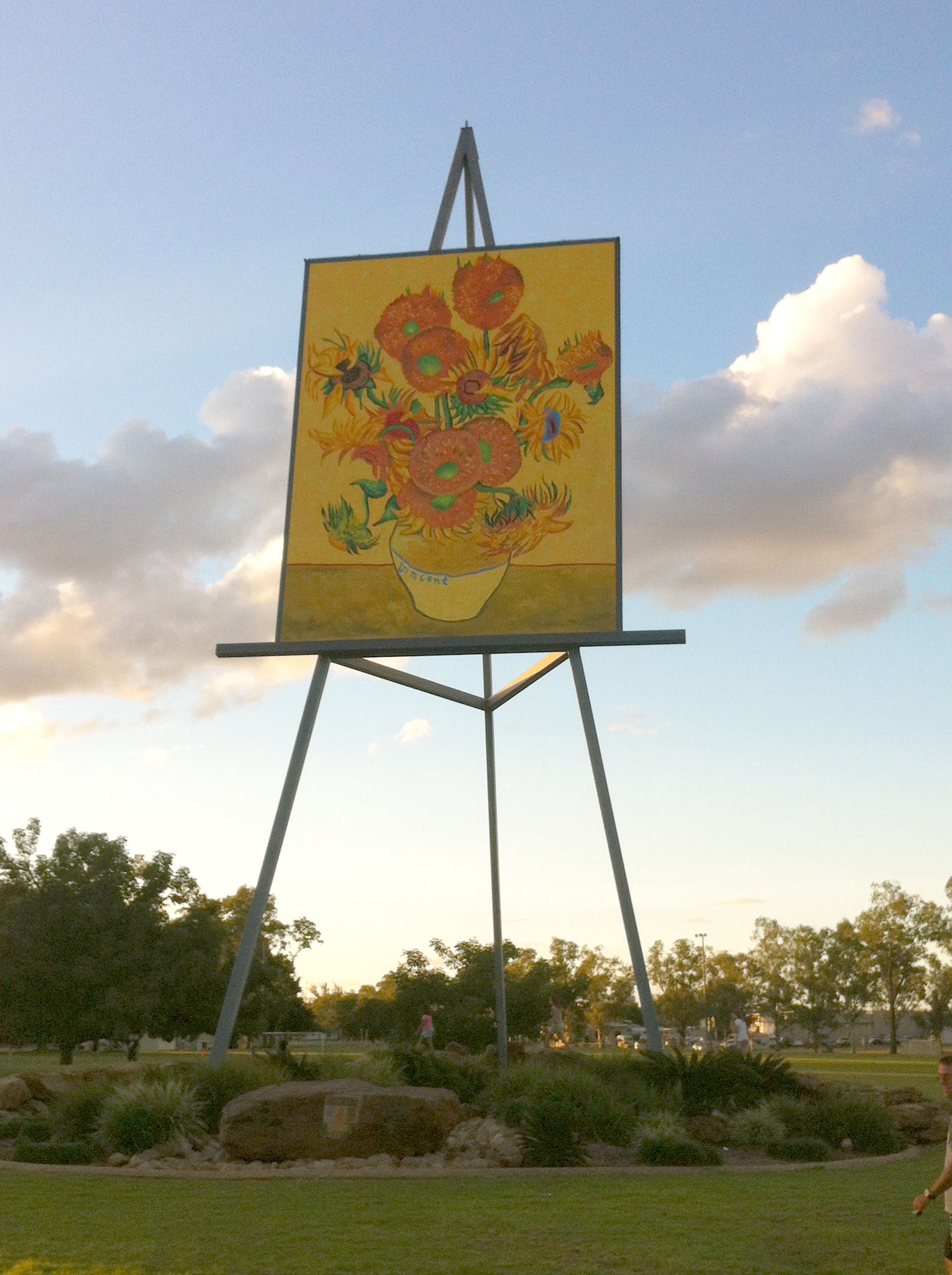
The Big Easel, Emerald

The Easel Project is an installation art piece, created by Canadian artist Cameron Cross, and located in the town of Emerald in Central Queensland, Australia.

== Overview ==
Erected in 1999, and unveiled in October of the same year, the installation artwork depicts Dutch artist Vincent van Gogh's (1853–1890) famous Sunflowers (1889) still life painting, which is currently part of the Van Gogh Museum's collection in Amsterdam.

The reproduction of van Gogh's painting is located on the corner of Dundas Street and the Capricorn Highway, situated in the centre of Emerald's Discovery Park. Weighing approximately 17,000 kilograms, Cross's steel easel measures 25 metres in height, with the canvas measuring 7 x 10 metres.

== Process ==
The easel's three legs consist of 30 x 30 square centimetres of steel tubing, which are secured to 10 metre piers by 24-1 metre anchor bolts. Cross used twenty-four sheets of plywood, laminated together from four panels, each of which was coated with fibreglass and then sealed with a gel coat. The plywood canvas is painted while flat on the ground, using high performance paint, which is both sprayed and hand-painted onto the surface of the plywood.

== Van Gogh Project ==
The giant easel in Emerald is one part of a series of seven internationally located installations titled the 'Van Gogh Project'. This Project sees reproductions of the seven still life paintings installed at different global locations van Gogh created while in Arles, France. The first Big Easel was installed in Altona, Manitoba in 1998 and another was placed in Goodland, Kansas in 2000. The artist is currently in discussions with other cities and towns around the world for the prospective locations of the other four outdoor installations. The seven sites proposed by Cross are intended to represent a diverse societal cross section, including both rural and urban cities with a wide range of population demographics. The Emerald Easel has become a local landmark in Australia, attributed to the fact that it is the largest painting in the Southern Hemisphere. The installation also acts as a symbol of international fine art, in its role in helping to unite cultures that are often disparate. In its efforts to help celebrate the Emerald region's reputation as one of Australia's primary sunflower producers, the Big Easel reflects the town's sense of community spirit and pride.

Cross' Project has focussed on selecting seven global sites which have either a connection to sunflower agriculture or an affiliation with the artist Vincent van Gogh. During his time in Arles, between 1888 and 1889, van Gogh created seven different, but similarly themed, still life paintings depicting sunflowers in a vase. The artist originally intended to paint twelve panels of sunflowers to decorate the Yellow House at Arles. Emerald's Big Easel is a copy of the repetition van Gogh made of the fourth version of his Sunflowers (1888), which is currently part of the National Gallery of London's collection. Van Gogh came to think of the sunflower as a type of artistic signature, stating in a letter to his brother, Theo van Gogh, in January 1889, "You know that Jeannin has the peony, Quost has the hollyhock, but I have the sunflower, in a way." The symbolic significance of the sunflower to van Gogh as an artist is reflected in the Van Gogh Project. In Cross' view, van Gogh associated the sunflower with life, symbolising the possibilities of hope and renewal. In this way, the Big Easel emerges as a tribute to both van Gogh's Sunflowers painting, as well as to Emerald's local sunflower agriculture and its annual Central Highlands Easter Sunflower Festival.

Cross' Van Gogh Project is designed to represent the nature of, and motivation for, the modern concept of reproduction and artistic appropriation in contemporary art practice. As an artist, Cross is interested in exploring the notion of traditional symbolism in art, and appropriating it into different social, historical and cultural contexts. In the case of his Van Gogh Project, Cross has taken the idea of the still life on an easel, a motif popularised in the nineteenth century, and enlarged it to an enormous scale, in order to transform this traditional symbol into a contemporary artwork in its own right. In reference to his creative objectives, Cross has stated via his website that, "By placing virtually the same sculpture in seven countries, with distinct cultures, I am curious as to how these sculptures will be interpreted. Will the sculpture be perceived for its reference to the sunflower, Van Gogh or art in general?"

The Van Gogh Project is designed to promote regional, agricultural and tourism development in the sites selected by Cross. His Project has encouraged cross cultural exchanges between cities, with Emerald and Altona forming a sister city alliance through their mutual celebrations of Sunflower Festivals. In a letter of recommendation for the Canadian artist, the mayor of Emerald Shire Council, Peter Maguire, stated that Cross' Van Gogh Project is "one of the most exciting and inventive tourism project ideas focused on developing tourism and economic development." Maguire has also credited Cross' project with the recent growth in the region's tourism industry, as well as the resultant job opportunities provided by the installation process. In his letter of recommendation, Maguire stated that "The giant easel is more than just a tourist attraction. The visitor is left with the impression that this booming city also has a cultural side. It has helped bond Emerald's arts and cultural groups together and in it they have something in their city to speak of with pride."

The installation process has helped support the local Emerald community, recruiting volunteers experiencing temporary unemployment, as well as art students from the local schools. Cross also employed a local fibreglass contractor to assist in the painting and preparation of the plywood canvas, highlighting the project's ability to encourage a sense of community engagement and development. Community contributions assisted in meeting the costs of construction, but a large portion of the funding for Cross' Project came from the Emerald Shire Council and funds from the Centenary of Federation.

== Bibliography ==
- Cross, Cameron. “Van Gogh Project.” Accessed March 18, 2017. http://cameronacross.com/publicart/van-gogh-project.
- Enns, Brian. “Letter of Recommendation, Altona & District Chamber of Commerce.” Accessed March 20, 2017. http://cameronacross.com/images/reference/Easel%20from%20Altona.pdf.
- Gibson, Lisanne, and Joanna Besley. Monumental Queensland: Signposts on a Cultural Landscape. Brisbane: University of Queensland Press, 2004.
- Jones, Melissa. Superlatives USA: The Largest, Smallest, Longest, Shortest, and Wackiest Sites in America. Sterling, Virginia: Capital Books, 2005.
- Leighton, John. “A recommendation from the director of The Van Gogh Museum.” Accessed March 20, 2017. http://cameronacross.com/images/reference/Easel%20from%20Sir%20John%20Leighton.pdf.
- Maguire, Peter. “Letter of Recommendation, Emerald Shire Council.” Accessed March 19, 2017. http://cameronacross.com/images/reference/Easel%20from%20Australia.pdf.
- Pepin, Yves. “Letter of Recommendation, Department of Foreign Affairs, Ottawa, Canada.” Accessed March 19, 2017. http://cameronacross.com/images/reference/Easel%20from%20Forgeign%20Affairs.pdf.
- Van Gogh, Vincent. Vincent van Gogh to Emile Bernard. 1888. In Van Gogh Museum, Amsterdam: Vincent van Gogh, The Letters, accessed March 9, 2017. http://vangoghletters.org/vg/letters/let665/letter.html.
- Van Gogh, Vincent. Vincent van Gogh to Theo van Gogh. 1889. In Van Gogh Museum, Amsterdam: Vincent van Gogh, The Letters, accessed March 9, 2017. http://vangoghletters.org/vg/letters/let741/letter.html.
