= Altona (film) =

- Directed by: Heath Affolter; Jon Affolter; Nathan Affolter; Thomas Affolter
- Written by: Heath Affolter; Jon Affolter; Nathan Affolter; Thomas Affolter
- Produced by: Heath Affolter; Jon Affolter; Nathan Affolter; Thomas Affolter; Craig Langdon
- Starring: Tyler Pelke
- Cinematography: Thomas Affolter; Kaayla Whachell
- Edited by: Heath Affolter; Jon Affolter; Nathan Affolter; Thomas Affolter
- Music by: Emily Rice
- Production companies: Foreshadow Films; Langer Films
- Release date: December 2, 2023 (Whistler)
- Running time: 94 minutes
- Country: Canada
- Language: English

Altona is a Canadian documentary film, directed by Heath Affolter, Jon Affolter, Nathan Affolter and Thomas Affolter, and released in 2023. The film centres on the 1990 Altona murder, in which Earl Giesbrecht, a teenager in Altona, Manitoba, assaulted two classmates, and then set the house they were located in on fire.

The film centres principally on the experiences of Tyler Pelke, who survived the incident and went onto become a motivational speaker and victims' rights advocate. Giesbrecht himself does not appear in the film, although he granted an interview to the Affolters and wrote a statement of penitence which was read in the film by actor Gabriel Carter.

The film premiered at the 2023 Whistler Film Festival, where it was the winner of the Whistler Film Festival Documentary Award. The Affolters received a Canadian Screen Award nomination for Best Editing in a Documentary at the 13th Canadian Screen Awards in 2025, and won the WGC Screenwriting Award for Best Writing in a Documentary.
