= Foreshadow Films =

Canadian film studio

Foreshadow Films, formerly Affolter Entertainment, is a Canadian film production studio, founded and run by brothers Nathan, Jon, Heath and Thomas Affolter.

The brothers, raised in Slocan Park, British Columbia, formed the firm in 2006, after they all moved to Vancouver to study at the Vancouver Film School or Capilano College. They have produced documentary features, both live action and animated short films, and music videos for Vancouver-area musicians.

== Awards ==
Their short film Soggy Flakes premiered in 2017, and received three Canadian Screen Award nominations at the 6th Canadian Screen Awards in 2018, including Best Web Program or Series, Fiction and Best Direction in a Web Program or Series for the Affolters.

In 2021, they won a WGC Screenwriting Award for their short film Try to Fly.

Their documentary film Altona, based on the Altona murder, won the Documentary Award at the 2023 Whistler Film Festival.
