= Curwin Friesen =

Curwin Friesen is a former President and Chief Executive Officer of Friesens Corporation, Canada's largest printer of hardcover books.

== Background ==
Friesen was raised in Altona, Manitoba. He received a B.A. in Economics from the University of Waterloo in 1993. In 2007, he was named one of Waterloo's 50 Outstanding alumni of the past fifty years.

== Friesens Corporation ==
While under his direction, the company has received multiple awards, including the National Association for Printing Leadership's highest management award and being listed as of Canada's 50 Best Managed Companies by Deloitte and Touche.

In 2004, he was listed as one of Canada's "Top 40 Under 40", a list of prominent businesspeople under forty years old, by The Globe and Mail and Caldwell Partners.

== See also ==
- List of University of Waterloo people
- Friesens Corporation
