= Matt Hebb =

American comic book artist

- Areas: Freelance Illustrator, penciler, inker, colorist

Matthew "Matt" Hebb is a freelance illustrator and American comic book artist, known for his work on creator-owned graphic novels for Arcana Comics and a comic based on DreamWorks' film, Home.

== Career ==
Matt Hebb has worked in various fields of the entertainment industry such as graphic design, storyboard for video games, comics, children's books, and trading card art. He attended Academy of Art University (AAU) from September 2000 to May 2005.

== Bibliography ==
=== Arcana Studio ===
- Harry Walton: Henchman for Hire (62 pages, 2011, ISBN 978-1897548967)
- Wonderdog Inc. (122 pages, 2010, ISBN 978-1897548875)

=== IDW Publishing ===
- America's Army #0 (June 2013), #3 (May 2014)

=== Moonstone Books ===
- Zombies vs Cheerleaders #1 (art), #3 (cover)

=== Titan Books ===
- Home #1 (September 2015)

=== FriesenPress ===
- Baby Bats Don't Hatch From Eggs (2015) ISBN 978-1460251553
- Benji Bat Wears Glasses (2015) ISBN 978-1460251577
- Carla the Clumsy Bat (2015) ISBN 978-1460247471

=== Bongo Comics ===
- Simpsons Comics #226 The Bullies! (pencils)
- Simpsons Comics #232 Are You Duff Enough (pencils)
