= Greg Guirard =

American photographer and nature writer

- Born: May 19, 1937; Southwest Louisiana, U.S.
- Died: June 2, 2017 (aged 80); Lafayette, Louisiana, U.S.
- Occupation: photographer
- Known for: Atchafalaya Autumn; Cajun Families of the Atchafalaya: Their ways and Words; Seasons of Light
- Website: www.gregguirard.com

Greg Guirard (May 19, 1937 – June 2, 2017) was an American photographer and nature writer on the Louisiana’s Atchafalaya Basin and Cajun culture. His works were focused on the Atchafalaya landscape, its flora and fauna, and its human population. His life and works were dedicated to nature preservation, inspired by other prominent environmentalists such as Thoreau or John Muir.

Besides his works as photographer and writer, Guirard was also an English teacher, tour guide through the Atchafalaya Basin, Cajun speech coach for actors, farmer and cypress furniture maker. He reused cypress logs dragged from the swamps and dedicated himself to reforest formerly deforested cypress lands by planting more than 50.000 trees throughout his entire life. He was an active supporter of Atchafalaya Basinkeeper, a non-profit organization dedicated to protecting and restoring the ecosystems within the Atchafalaya Basin.

Following Thoreau's example, he dedicated himself to pursue a simpler way of living, and his personal Walden was the Atchafalaya Basin where he lived in a riverboat house. Some attribute LSU's 1958 championship in football to the speech he gave to the team.

== Books ==
- Atchafalaya Autumn. October 28, 1995 by Greg Guirard. ISBN 0962477834.

His most famous book is a photograph collection focused on the Atchafalaya Basin, its scenery, wildlife and Cajun culture and their struggle to survive. The book includes texts written by other writers on their experiences on the Basin.

- Atchafalaya Autumn II. November 30, 2010 by Greg Guirard. ISBN 0962477826.
- Cajun Families of the Atchafalaya: Their Ways and Word. October 28, 1990 by Greg Guirard. ISBN 096247780X.
- The Land of Dead Giants. A Louisiana Story in English and French. April 28, 2001 by Friesens Corporation. ISBN 0962477869.
- PsychoTherapy for Cajuns A Traditional Culture Struggles for Survival in a Crazy World. November 2006 by Greg Guirard.
- Inherit the Atchafalaya. August 28, 2007 by University of Louisiana. ISBN 1887366768.
- Seasons of Light in the Atchafalaya Basin. November 1, 1983 by Greg Guirard. ISBN 0685294277.

== See also ==
- Swamp Land Act of 1850
