= Grace Nickel =

Canadian artist (born 1956)

- Born: 1956 (age 69–70); Altona, Manitoba, Canada
- Education: BFA in Ceramics from the University of Manitoba in 1980; Museology Studies certificate, University of Winnipeg in 1981; MFA from the Nova Scotia College of Art and Design, Halifax, Nova Scotia in 2008
- Known for: ceramic artist
- Website: gracenickel.ca

Grace Nickel RCA (born 1956) is a Canadian ceramic artist and art instructor in post-secondary education.

== Early life ==
Grace Nickel was born in 1956 in Altona, Manitoba, Canada. She earned her BFA in Ceramics from the University of Manitoba in 1980; Museology Studies certificate, University of Winnipeg in 1981; and MFA from the Nova Scotia College of Art and Design, Halifax, Nova Scotia in 2008. In the summer of 1999, she was invited to the 9th National Ceramic Conference in Perth, Australia. There she demonstrated her work in paper clay as well as presenting work of Manitoba's ceramic community.

== Career ==
In 1991, she discovered paper clay while at the Banff Centre. Since that time she has employed that material to create sculptural ceramics. She has developed a number of architectural installations, including the Meditation Window at the St. Norbert Arts Centre in Manitoba, and Sanctuary, NCECA in Minneapolis, USA, 1995. Nickel completed a number of site-specific commissions, including tile installations and sculptural lighting for public and private architectural spaces. In 1999, she created a tile triptych to honour of the hosting of the Pan Am Games that was subsequently exhibited at Winnipeg City Hall. She created a work for the entrance to the Beechwood National Cemetery in Ottawa, Ontario.

Nickel teaches ceramics full-time in the School of Art of the University of Manitoba.

== Exhibitions ==
Nickel's work has been exhibited in the United States and overseas in Australia, Japan, New Zealand and Taiwan, including:

- Unity and Diversity Cheongju International Craft Biennale, Korea
- Northern Lights/Southern Exposure, Perth Galleries, Perth, Australia
- Inaugural Exhibition The Canadian Ceramic Museum, Fuping, China, 2007
- Earth Matters NCECA Invitational Exhibition 2010, Philadelphia

In Canada, solo exhibitions at:

- A Quiet Passage, Winnipeg Art Gallery, 2002
- Devastatus Rememorari, Mary E. Black Gallery, Halifax, Nova Scotia, 2008; Gallery in the Park, Altona, Manitoba 2009
- Arbor Vitae, Canadian Clay and Glass Gallery, Waterloo, ON, 2015; Actual Contemporary, Winnipeg, MB, 2016; Disjecta Contemporary Art Centre, Portland, OR, 2017; the Moose Jaw Museum and Art Gallery, 2018
- Eruptions, Art Gallery of Burlington, 2019; Gallery 1C03 at the University of Winnipeg in 2022
- Inter Artes et Naturam (Between Art and Nature), Winnipeg Art Gallery, 2023

== Selected collections ==
In Canada her work has been included in the collections of:

- The Claridge Collection, Montreal (1989 to 2015)
- Winnipeg Art Gallery
- Government of Manitoba art collection
- Art Gallery of Nova Scotia

In addition her work has been acquired by:

- National Museum of History, Taipei, Taiwan
- Museum of Modern Ceramic Art, Gifu, Japan
- New Taipei City Yingge Ceramics Museum, Taiwan

== Awards ==
- Bronze Award, 2nd International Ceramics Competition 1989, Mino, Japan
- Judge's Special Award, Sixth Taiwan Golden Ceramics Awards, Taipei, Taiwan
- Inducted into the Royal Canadian Academy of Arts in 2007
- Saidye Bronfman Award, 2023

== Bibliography ==
- Glen R. Brown (2012), "Grace Nickel, Clay and Light", pp 47–52 in Anderson Turner ed., Ceramic Art: Innovative Techniques (Ceramic Arts Handbook series), The American Ceramic Society, 136 pp, ISBN 978-1-574985-29-0, 1-5749-8529-9.
- Patricia Bovey (2007), "Grace Nickel", in Ingeborg Boyens ed., Encyclopedia of Manitoba, pp 498–99. Winnipeg: Great Plains Publications, ISBN 978-1-894283-71-7, 1-8942-8371-6.
- Helen Delacretaz and Grace Nickel (2002), Grace Nickel: A Quiet Passage, Winnipeg: The Winnipeg Art Gallery, 32 pp, ISBN 0889152179.

== See also ==
- List of Canadian artists
