= Cole Howard (voice actor) =

Canadian stage and voice actor

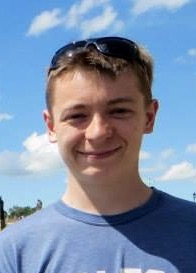
- Occupation: Voice actor

Cole Howard is a Canadian voice actor currently living in Vancouver, British Columbia. He voices for films, commercials, anime, cartoons, and video games. He was the voice lead in Bob's Broken Sleigh. He is also known for his performances as Kosuke Ueki from The Law of Ueki, Van Yamano from Little Battlers Experience Lief from Deltora Quest, and Takumi Tokiha from My-HiME.

== Awards and nominations ==
Leo Awards 2016 - Best Performance in an Animation Program or Series° - Winner

== Filmography ==
=== Animation ===
- Action Dad — Jack Poundpenny
- Barbie & Her Sisters in A Pony Tale — Jonas
- Bob's Broken Sleigh — Bob
- The Deep - Griffin
- The Dragon Prince — Crow Master
- Fruit Ninja: Frenzy Force — Seb
- GeofreakZ — M-Flip
- Kaeloo — Stumpy (English dub)
- The Little Prince — Nickel (B 356 episodes 11-12, The Planet of Jade)
- Marvel Super Hero Adventures — Spider-Man
- Mega Man: Fully Charged — Bert Wily, Peter Punkowski
- My Little Pony: Friendship Is Magic — Terramar
- The New Adventures of Peter Pan — Stringbean
- Ninjago — Kataru, Benthomaar
- Ratchet & Clank — Blarg
- SheZow — Matt Wheeler/Armedmax, Ned Wallis/White Knight
- Soggy Flakes — Dr. Birdberry
- Spider-Man Marvel Video Comics — Spider-Man
- Superbook — Micah

=== Video games ===
- D.I.C.E. (PlayStation 2) — Marco Rocca
- Hogworld: Gnarts Adventure (iOS app) — Gnart
- Mega Man Powered Up — Mega Man, Mega Man?
- Trinity: Souls of Zill Ơll — Zeraschel, Male Young 2
- Zhu Zhu Pets: Kung Zhu — Private Abrams

== Dubbing roles ==
=== Anime dubbing ===
- B-Daman Fireblast — Novu Moru (Credited as Cole Hanson)
- Beyblade Burst — Wakiya Murasaki (Seasons 1-2)
- Cardfight!! Vanguard — Kyou Yahagi, Oracle
- Cardfight!! Vanguard: Asia Circuit — Kyou Yahagi
- Cardfight!! Vanguard G — Shion Kiba (Credited as Cole Hanson)
- Cardfight!! Vanguard G GIRS Crisis — Shion Kiba, Kyou Yahagi (Credited as Cole Hanson)
- Cardfight!! Vanguard G Stride Gate — Shion Kiba (Credited as Cole Hanson)
- Danball Senki - Ban Yamano
- Deltora Quest — Lief, Evil Lief (Eps. 36-37)
- D.I.C.E. — Clo-Zan
- Di Gi Charat Nyo! — Mjr. Coo Erhard/Young Yasushi
- Dragon Ball Z Kai — Android 17 (Ocean Productions dub)
- Full Moon O Sagashite — Machida
- Future Card Buddyfight — Gayaoka, Magoroku Shido, Raita Niitani, Tasuku Ryuenji (Credited as Cole Hanson)
- Future Card Buddyfight 100 — Gayaoka (ep 18); Kirikakure Saizo (ep 10); Magoroku Shido/Death Shido (19 episodes); Raita Niitani (eps 2-3, 22); Saizo (ep 15); Shinji (eps 4, 25); Tasuku Ryuenji (eps 1-25); Zepar (ep 12) (Credited as Cole Hanson)
- Gintama° — Shinpachi Shimura
- Hoop Days — Satoh
- Little Battlers Experience series — Van Yamano (Credited as Cole Hanson)
- Kingdom series — Xin, Sei Kyou (Seasons 1-2)
- My-HiME — Takumi Tokiha
- My-Otome — Takumi Tokiha
- The Law of Ueki — Kosuke Ueki
- Sinbad — Sinbad
- Tide-Line Blue — Adjutant Teen Gould; Keel's Male Partner (Ep. 1)
- Zoids Wild — Arashi

=== Video games dubbing ===
- Gundam BEC (PlayStation 2) — Elijah
- Mega Man Powered Up (PlayStation PSP) — Mega Man
- Mobile Suit Gundam Seed: Never Ending Tomorrow (PlayStation 2) — Elijah Cole
