= Swamp Dogg Gets His Pool Painted =

2024 American documentary film

- Film poster
- Directed by: Isaac Gale; Ryan Olson; David McMurry
- Written by: Andrew Broder; Isaac Gale; Paul Lovelace; Ryan Olson
- Produced by: Isaac Gale; Paul Lovelace; David McMurry; Ryan Olson; Ben Wu
- Starring: Swamp Dogg; Guitar Shorty; Moogstar
- Cinematography: David McMurry; Ryan Thompson
- Edited by: Paul Lovelace; Isaac Gale; Ryan Olson
- Music by: Swamp Dogg; Moogstar; Ryan Olson; Alex Epton
- Production company: Poorly Painted Pools
- Distributed by: Magnolia Pictures
- Release dates: March 8, 2024 (SXSW); May 2, 2025 (United States)
- Running time: 95 minutes
- Country: United States
- Language: English
- Box office: $51,047

Swamp Dogg Gets His Pool Painted is a 2024 American documentary film directed by Isaac Gale, Ryan Olson and David McMurry. The film profiles Jerry "Swamp Dogg" Williams, a musician who has been an influential cult figure in American music despite never achieving mainstream fame, who lives with his friends and colleagues Larry "Moogstar" Clemons and David "Guitar Shorty" Kearney in a modest home in the San Fernando Valley which the three men have maintained as an artistic haven.

Guitar Shorty died during the film's production, with the aftermath of his death forming part of the film's storyline.

The film premiered on March 8, 2024, at the SXSW festival, and was given a theatrical release in the United States on May 2, 2025, by Magnolia Pictures.

== Reception ==
=== Critical response ===
On the review aggregator website Rotten Tomatoes, 100% of 25 critics' reviews are positive. Metacritic, which uses a weighted average, assigned the film a score of 71 out of 100, based on five critics, indicating "generally favorable" reviews.

Joe Gross of the Austin Chronicle wrote that "Gale and Olson bring a stoner energy to the proceedings, funny and a little hyper, amplifying Swamp’s stories with titles dropped into the footage and animated bits à la Mike Judge’s totally excellent series Tales From the Tour Bus. Judge pops in, in fact, as do Johnny Knoxville and voice actor Tom Kenny, mostly just to shoot the breeze with Swamp, poolside."

For The Hollywood Reporter, Daniel Fienberg wrote that the film "isn’t the sort of 'important' documentary that generally wins awards, but it’s a fine example of something even rarer: a documentary that draws its voice and aesthetic from the spirit of its subject, resulting in a tight 97 minutes that feel organic and satisfying and, as befits that subject, appealingly odd." He concluded that "whether or not you know Jerry 'Swamp Dogg' Williams when the documentary begins, it’s easy to walk away feeling like this is pretty much exactly the spotlight that Swamp Dogg deserves."

=== Awards ===
At the 2024 Whistler Film Festival, it won the Best Documentary Award.
