= Mr. Zaritsky on TV =

2016 Canadian documentary film

- Directed by: Jennifer Di Cresce; Michael Savoie
- Written by: Jennifer Di Cresce
- Produced by: Jennifer Di Cresce; Michael Savoie
- Starring: John Zaritsky
- Cinematography: Michael Savoie
- Edited by: Deborah Palloway
- Music by: James Mark Stewart
- Production company: Big Twin Productions
- Distributed by: Documentary Channel
- Release date: December 2016 (Whistler)
- Running time: 79 minutes
- Country: Canada
- Language: English

Mr. Zaritsky on TV is a Canadian documentary film, directed by Jennifer Di Cresce and Michael Savoie and released in 2016. The film is a profile of influential Canadian documentary filmmaker John Zaritsky, as he works on his 2016 film No Limits: The Thalidomide Saga.

The film premiered at the 2016 Whistler Film Festival, where it received an honorable mention from the Best Documentary Award jury. It was subsequently broadcast on the Documentary Channel in January 2017.
