= Whistler Film Festival Documentary Award =

The Whistler Film Festival Documentary Award is an annual juried award, given by the Whistler Film Festival to the film selected as the year's best documentary film in the festival program.

== Winners ==
Year	Film	Director(s)	Ref
2002	FIX: The Story of an Addicted City	Nettie Wild	
2003	Baghdad or Bust	Matt Frame	
2004	Scared Sacred	Velcrow Ripper	
2005	The Best of Secter and the Rest of Secter	Joel Secter	
2006	Air Guitar Nation	Alexandra Lipsitz	
2007	We Are Together (Thina Simunye)	Paul Taylor	
2008	The Art Star and the Sudanese Twins	Pietra Brettkelly	
2009	Pax Americana and the Weaponization of Space	Denis Delestrac	
2009	Last Train Home	Lixin Fan	
2010	Marwencol	Jeff Malmberg	
2011	Kivalina v. Exxon	Ben Addelman	
2012	Status Quo? The Unfinished Business of Feminism in Canada	Karen Cho	
2013	Jingle Bell Rocks!	Mitchell Kezin	
2014	The Backward Class	Madeleine Grant	
2015	Last Harvest	Jane Hui Wang	
2016	Sled Dogs	Fern Levitt	
2016	The Will to Fly	Katie Bender, Leo Baker	
2016	Mr. Zaritsky on TV	Jennifer Di Cresce, Michael Savoie	
2017	The Gospel According to André	Kate Novack	
2017	There Is a House Here	Alan Zweig	
2018	Momentum Generation	Jeff Zimbalist, Michael Zimbalist	
2019	Once Were Brothers: Robbie Robertson and the Band	Daniel Roher	
2020	Crock of Gold	Julien Temple	
2020	The Paper Man (Lafortune en papier)	Tanya Lapointe	
2021	Poly Styrene: I Am a Cliché	Celeste Bell, Paul Sng	
2022	River	Jennifer Peedom	
2022	Out in the Ring	Ry Levey	
2023	Altona	Heath Affolter, Jon Affolter, Nathan Affolter, Thomas Affolter	
2023	500 Days in the Wild	Dianne Whelan	
2024	Swamp Dogg Gets His Pool Painted	Isaac Gale, Ryan Olson, David McMurry	
2025	Agatha's Almanac	Amalie Atkins	
