= Murder of Curtis Klassen =

Canadian murder case

Altona murder
- Location: Altona, Manitoba, Canada
- Date: November 17, 1990
- Attack type: attempted murder, sexual assault, stabbing, arson
- Weapons: .357 Magnum revolver (Intimidation use only); knife
- Deaths: 1
- Injuries: 1
- Victims: Tyler Pelke, aged 14; Curtis Klassen, aged 15
- Perpetrator: Earl Giesbrecht
- Motive: revenge
- Convictions: Murder & Attempted Murder (2 counts)

In Altona, Manitoba, Canada, on November 17, 1990, Curtis Klassen, aged 15, was murdered by 17-year-old Earl Giesbrecht. Another teen, Tyler Pelke, aged 14, survived great bodily injuries and alerted authorities.

Giesbrecht was arrested shortly after, and confessed to the murder. Despite being a juvenile offender, he was prosecuted and convicted to life in prison. Thirty years later, in 2020, Giesbrecht was granted a conditional release. The murder and subsequent release of the perpetrator gained attention from Canadian media.

== Murder ==
On the night of November 17, 1990, 14-year-old Tyler Pelke and 15-year-old Curtis Klassen were at Pelke's home, after attending an event for their hockey team. While watching a movie, 17-year-old Earl Giesbrecht knocked on their door. Giesbrecht threatened the boys with a .357 Magnum. After tying up, torturing and sexually assaulting them, Giesbrecht stabbed both boys, killing Klassen, and set fire to the house.

Despite his injuries, including a slit throat and third-degree burns to 25% of his body, Pelke managed to escape and alerted a neighbour.

== Aftermath and controversy ==
Classmates described Giesbrecht as a "bully" and "manipulative". During his trial, Giesbrecht testified he had been molested as a child, and bullied for being gay. He had "revenge fantasies" after Pelke and Klassen made a demeaning comment to him. Giesbrecht was convicted of first-degree murder and attempted murder, and although 17, sentenced to life in prison in Rockwood Institution with no parole until 2015.

Described as a model inmate, Giesbrecht earned degrees in business administration and human resources. Pelke became a firefighter, inspirational speaker and victim's rights advocate, visiting and forgiving Giesbrecht while he was in prison. Giesbrecht was granted temporary absences from prison starting in 2010, against Pelke's testimony that, "A life sentence was given and, as such, should be served." In 2020, Giesbrecht was granted full parole, a conditional release that allows an offender to serve part of a prison sentence in the community, though he was forbidden from returning to Altona.

A documentary about the murder, Altona, premiered in 2023 at the Whistler Film Festival, winning the Best Documentary award. Giesbrecht, although not appearing on camera, agreed to an interview which was transcribed and read by an actor in the documentary.
