= Johann Funk =

Johann Funk (December 26, 1836 – March 15, 1917) was a Mennonite bishop in early Canadian history.

Funk was born on the Bergthal Colony, a Mennonite settlement near Mariupol, Yekaterinoslav Governorate, Russian Empire (Today Ukraine) in 1836. In 1874, bishop Gerhard Wiebe persuaded the colony to emigrate to Canada. Funk was ordained a bishop in Canada in 1892, and played a significant role in the development of Mennonite education and the formation of Mennonite Collegiate Institute in Gretna, Manitoba.

Funk died in 1917 in Altbergthal, near Altona, Manitoba.
