= Soggy Flakes =

- Directed by: Heath Affolter; Jon Affolter; Nathan Affolter; Thomas Affolter
- Written by: Heath Affolter; Jon Affolter; Nathan Affolter; Thomas Affolter
- Produced by: Heath Affolter; Jon Affolter; Nathan Affolter; Thomas Affolter
- Starring: Peter New; Cole Howard; April Cameron; David C. Jones; Stephanie Halber; Robert Heimbecker; Toren Atkinson
- Music by: Steffan Andress
- Production company: Affolter Entertainment
- Distributed by: Telus Storyhive
- Release date: 2017
- Running time: 5 minutes
- Country: Canada
- Language: English

Soggy Flakes is a 2017 Canadian animated short comedy film, created by Heath, Jon, Nathan and Thomas Affolter. The film centres on a group of washed-up former breakfast cereal mascots, who are forced to reevaluate their definition of success when they unexpectedly encounter their sellout former friend and colleague Captain Kale. The voice cast includes Peter New, Cole Howard, April Cameron, David C. Jones, Stephanie Halber, Robert Heimbecker and Toren Atkinson.

The film was funded in part by a $10,000 prize from Telus's Storyhive contest for emerging filmmakers, and was inspired by a news report suggesting that Kellogg's was considering expanding into dog food due to declining sales of its breakfast cereal lines.

The film premiered at the Montreal Stop Motion Festival in 2017, and was later screened at the Vancouver Short Film Festival in 2018, but was distributed primarily through Storyhive's YouTube channel.

The film received three Canadian Screen Award nominations at the 6th Canadian Screen Awards, for Best Web Program or Series, Fiction, Best Direction in a Web Program or Series (the Affolters) and Best Actor in a Web Program or Series (New).
