= 500 Days in the Wild =

2023 Canadian documentary film

- Directed by: Dianne Whelan
- Written by: Dianne Whelan; Tanya Maryniak
- Produced by: Betsy Carson
- Starring: Dianne Whelan
- Cinematography: Dianne Whelan
- Edited by: Tanya Maryniak
- Music by: David F. Ramos
- Production companies: Elevation Pictures; Rebel Sisters Productions
- Release date: December 1, 2023 (Whistler)
- Running time: 125 minutes
- Country: Canada
- Language: English

500 Days in the Wild is a 2023 Canadian documentary film directed by Dianne Whelan, chronicling Whelan's multi-year effort to travel the entire length of the Trans Canada Trail.

The film premiered at the 2023 Whistler Film Festival, where it received an honorable mention from the Best Documentary Award jury and was the winner of the Audience Award.

== Critical response ==
Reviewing the film for Exclaim!, Hogan Short wrote that "although it could have benefited from a tighter edit, 500 Days in the Wild remains a remarkable endeavour. From serene vistas to encounters with wildlife, starkly contrasted with the hustle and bustle of city life, Whelan perfectly showcases this great country."
