= Fern Levitt =

Canadian documentary maker

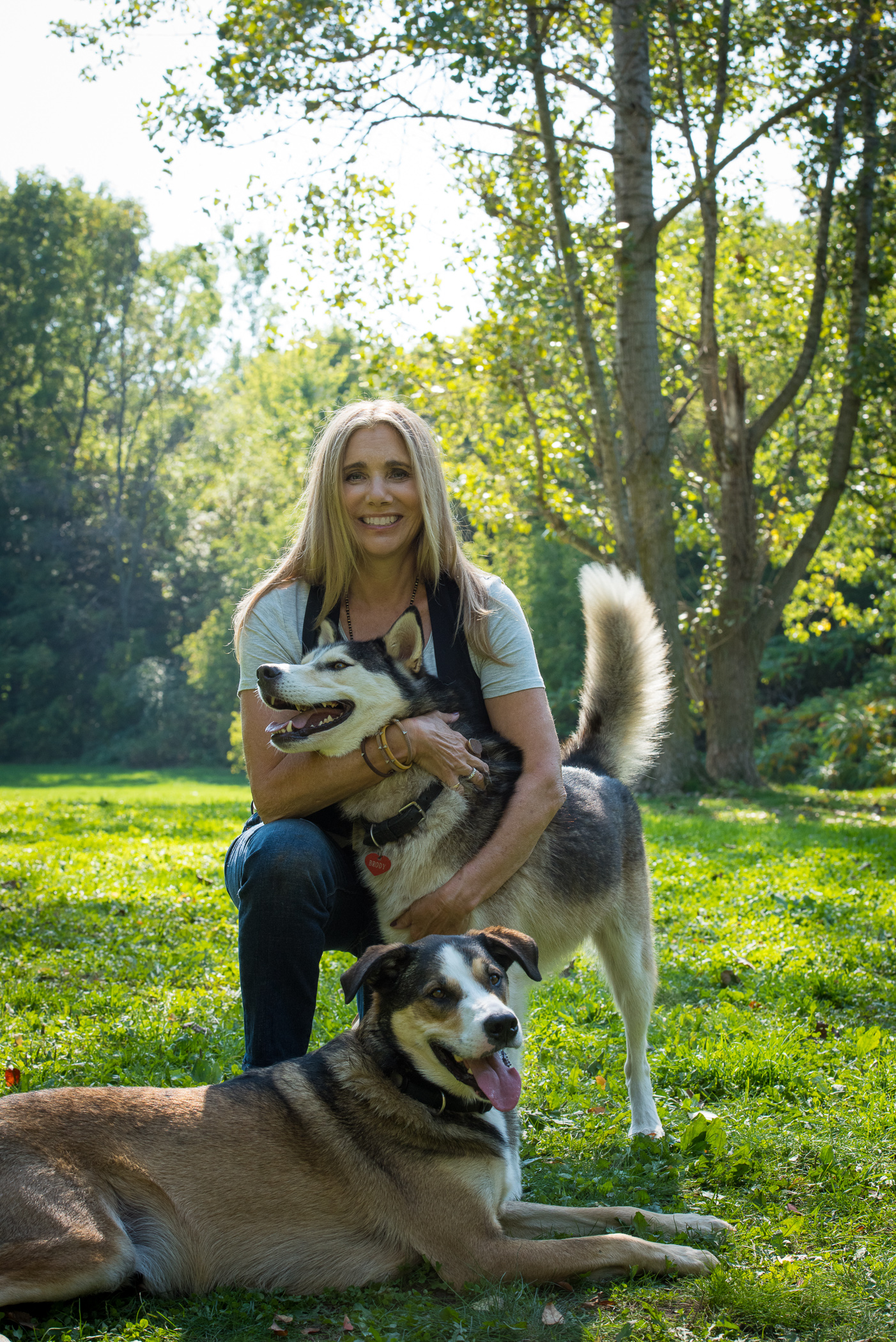
- Born: 1955 (age 70–71); Hamilton, Ontario, Canada
- Education: York University
- Occupation: Film director
- Known for: Sled Dogs
- Television: Turning Points in History
- Family: Married to Arnie Zipursky

Fern Levitt is a Canadian-born animal activist, documentary producer and director. Her films focus on human rights, the Holocaust, discrimination against African-Americans in the US, animal welfare, and socially relevant issues. She is best known for her 2016 documentary Sled Dogs, which aired on the CBC Documentary channel. It explores the Iditarod, raising allegations of animal cruelty among breeders, trainers and kennelers of the event's sled dogs.

== Education ==
Levitt attended Westdale Secondary School and Hamilton Collegiate Institute

== Documentaries ==
About her work, Levitt said "You don't do it for the money. I love telling these stories because if these people, Gorbachev, Havel and others, can take a stand under such impossible circumstances, then I have a responsibility to do it, too." Admitting to being a fan of Gorbachev, "I think he is the greatest leader this world has ever had,” she said. “To come from that (repressive) environment and do what he did was amazing. I was completely caught up in Gorba-mania.” Levitt has also filmed and interviewed former US president's Bill Clinton and George Bush, former Czech leader, Vaclav Havel, and former president of Georgia, Eduard Shevardnadze.

=== Sled Dogs (2016) ===
Levitt and her producer husband, Arnie Zipursky, were interviewed about the life of these dogs, specifically the quality of their surroundings, their treatment, and their reactions to witnessing their behaviour in captivity. They went dogsledding in 2010 outside Huntsville, close to Algonquin Park and shared their observations. Levitt described the layout they encountered upon arriving, explaining that the dogsleds are "set up" with dogs waiting for them. However, "you don't see where the dogs live." So they both decided to return later to see where the dogs lived and were shocked at the scene in front of them: over 200 dogs in a field, covered in mud, running frantically in circles because they were chained to posts. "There was urine and excrement everywhere, and they looked so thin," Levitt recalled. After learning all this, Levitt recalls feeling horrified about their recent participation. At that moment, Levitt recalls, standing amidst the chaos and suffering, Levitt and Zipursky felt they needed to make up for their recent participation in dog sledding. Zipursky recalls his conversation with a caretaker on-site, finding out that the dogs were used for 9 to 10 years and then shot. They immediately put a 9-year-old husky, destined for the same fate, in their car to take home. However, the idea for the documentary wasn't thought of until witnessing the same conditions, later in Whistler.

In Whistler, BC, Levitt witnessed the same pattern of conditions and was told by the local caretaker that, "this is an anomaly, and never happens, I knew differently at that point," shares Levitt. The idea to create "Sled Dogs" was born. CTV's Molly Thomas confirmed these findings with a hidden camera on W5.

==== During The Filming ====
During her work on "Sled Dogs" (216), Levitt researched the subject of animal treatment in the industry. As Levitt's research progressed, she uncovered numerous cases of animal abuse, which led her to produce a film to raise awareness and shut down the industry. The film highlights the lives of dogs trained from a young age and then often confined to short chains for pulling tourists or racing. The film also exposes the unfortunate cases of dogs that are killed when they are no longer useful, such as the 100 animals that a recreational sledding company near Whistler, British Columbia, shot.

In an interview with the Canadian Broadcasting Corporation (CBC), she stated, "I was absolutely shocked. To me it looked like a concentration camp of dogs," and "Most Canadians have no idea what goes on in the sled dog operations."

The People for the Ethical Treatment of Animals (PETA) gave Levitt's Documentary to a representative of US banking institution, Wells Fargo. A Globe and Mail article reported that this major corporate sponsor was "disturbed by its content" with withdrew their sponsorship of the Iditarod Trail Sled Dog Race.

==== Release in Vancouver ====
The Vancouver Humane Society created a press release about Sled Dogs (2016) to let people know that the release of the documentary's premiere will be screened as part of Whistler's Documentary Strand program, and that the location was picked because of its proximity to where 100 sled dogs were "brutally murdered, sparking outrage throughout North America." The timing of the screening was noted by Levitt to be a "critical moment when the public is waking up to the treatment of animals and demanding change. The audience will be outraged when they discover the legal abuse of ‘man’s best friend’ under the guise of sport and entertainment."

Levitt called The documentary a "definitive call to action." According to Producer Arnie Zipursky, documentaries hold immense power in the modern world as they offer a platform to educate viewers on various issues. In the case of Sled Dogs, the documentary not only sheds light on hidden truths but also inspires the audience to drive positive change through increased awareness

According to Bruce Cowley, the senior director of Documentary Channel, "Sled Dogs" offers an unfiltered and honest view of an industry that needs to improve. After watching the film, viewers will have a different perspective on dog-sledding and dogs in general.

"Sled Dogs" explores the lesser-known aspects of the sled dog industry, shedding light on the living conditions of these animals during the off-season. Rather than focusing on the commonly promoted image of sled dogs as tourism and sports icons, the film presents a sincere and moving account, encouraging viewers to delve deeper into the topic and reconsider their perceptions of the industry.

The documentary film "Sled Dogs" features four interconnected stories that take place across various locations in North America, including Alaska, Colorado, Wyoming, Quebec, British Columbia, and Ontario.

== The Impact of Sled Dogs film Leading To Investigations ==
In a segment titled "Dogs In Distress”, CTV's W5, North America's longest-running current affairs show, employed a hidden camera during its investigation into the mistreatment of dogs reported by Levitt. The episode shared the account of an activist who travelled across Canada, and found roughly 2,000 dogs, all on chains, frantically running in circles. During the program, Levitt described receiving troubling news in 2020 from an ex-employee, reporting the use of a homemade gas chamber used in the killing of dogs at Expedition Mi-Loup, a dog sledding outfit in Quebec. Levitt stated, "I had to find out if this was true, that they had built a gas chamber, and were gassing puppies." Levitt described receiving word that the former employee had written to the SPCA in Quebec and to the Ministry of Agriculture about the allegations, but "they didn't do anything," said Levitt.

According to W5, Levitt, after both the SPCA and the Ministry neither confirmed or denied any wrongdoing at Expedition Mi-Loup, decided to investigate the story herself. She had her contact draw up a map to the camp in Quebec and arrived at midnight in the dark accompanied by a few friends. What she found shocked her. Levitt describes a closed plastic box, with a gas line leading to a canister of welding gas. She opened the box and was horrified. Corpses of dogs murdered by gas were found in the plastic storage container. In the next room was a deep freezer full of puppies and 2 adult dogs. Levitt described the puppies as if they were "sleeping, except they had been frozen to death."

In the aftermath of these revelations, Quebec authorities arrested three individuals involved in the gassings of dogs at Expedition Mi-Loup.

"Quebec provincial police say three people are facing animal cruelty charges in Quebec City in connection with the discovery of dogs and puppies gassed, frozen to death in freezers and hanging at a sled dog company. The Sûreté du Québec says Antoine Simard, 41, Elisabeth Leclerc, 39, and 58-year-old Édouard Parent were charged with animal cruelty and neglect at the Quebec City courthouse on Thursday after being arrested the day prior."

== Lucy: The Stolen Life of Elephants ==
Filmed in Canada, the US, Sri Lanka, Brazil, Argentina and Swaziland, the docu-film contrasts the difference between elephants confined in zoos with elephants thriving in their natural habitat. This documentary film is centred around Lucy, Edmonton Valley Zoo's 50-year-old elephant and the work of animal rights advocates as they attempt to have Lucy moved from the Edmonton zoo where she can live with other elephants. PAWS (Performing Animal Welfare Society) sanctuary is in San Andreas, California, and they specialize in providing a place for performance or exploited animals. Having to go undercover to get hidden-camera footage from African Lion Safari was a result of not getting responses from the list of 253 accredited zoos in North America. Levitt's production team requested to do on-site interviews for the film but only got one response agreeing to be filmed.

The film advocates for animal rights, and shows rare footage of the mistreatment of elephants through a variety of hidden cameras at one of Canada's well-known tourist attractions, African Lion Safari. Paired with testimony from a former elephant worker, who later became an activist, the film shows graphic footage of elephants being beaten and electrified using prods to the elephants more sensitive places, causing increased discomfort. The allegations against African Lion Safari have brought legal warnings to Levitt, threatening legal action if he film was released. “Both breeding them and keeping them in their confined spaces is cruelty in itself. There is just so much suffering these elephants are subjected to," Levitt explained in the Hamilton Spectator. The film showcases other elephants as well and their stories as they wait for be moved to sanctuaries. Kuky and Pupy, in Buenos Aires, are filmed in a reinvented zoo. Another pair of elephants in Argentina are moved to Global Sanctuary for Elephants in Brazil.

The film released on March 21, 2025, and African Lion Safari issued a statement, strongly denying the visual proof shown in this film: “We appreciate Fern Levitt has strong political views and has chosen filmmaking to pursue her agenda. Her feelings and those of the individuals she’s interviewed do not accurately reflect the reality at African Lion Safari.” Levitt replied publicly that she hopes ALS follows through on their threat to gain more publicity for Lucy's case and the film. “My motivation is teaching people and helping these animals, so they can threaten all they want. I’m not going to stop.”

Levitt strongly advocates how important elephants are to the ecosystem. Their eating habits help spread seeds and their footprint is an important part of our planets health. The film shows elephants mourning passing family members, and shows the strong familial bonds between mother and child. At one point in the film, they showed the result of zoo breeding with a mother giving birth to her baby, while being held down by chains, as they take the baby elephant from her.

On April 2, 2025, PETA published and article four days before CBC premiered the film on their documentary channel, supporting Levitt's new film. The article stated, "she has endured decades of solitary confinement, abuse, exploitation, and neglect at the seedy facility," before telling the story of Lucy's early life. In the article, elephants and their behaviours and mindsets are more explained to highlight their importance to the planet. "The Edmonton Valley Zoo has imprisoned Lucy for nearly half a century, depriving her of the companionship she desperately needs." The article is a call to action and a reminder that there are more animals like Lucy worldwide in need of help.

Levitt has spoken out about The Jane Goodall Act (Bill S-15 in Canada). A bill that is being weighed in Canada''s Capital and one that could potentially make Canada the first country to ban the keeping of Elephants in zoos.

In August 2026, Levitt wrote an opinion article for The Globe and Mail opposing the captivity of wild animals in zoos, aquariums and safari parks. She described how directing Lucy: The Stolen Lives of Elephants led her to reconsider her previous participation in zoo visits and dolphin-swimming attractions. Levitt criticized the transfer of whales from Marineland to aquariums in the United States and Spain as a continuation of their captivity. She also supported the reintroduction of Bill S-15, proposed legislation concerning captive elephants and great apes, and cited the Buenos Aires Eco Park’s use of robotics and 3-D animation as an alternative method of wildlife education.

In an interview on CBC Radio's ''The Current'', Levitt expressed disappointment that Bill S-15, proposed legislation concerning the captivity of elephants and great apes, had not been reintroduced. Discussing ''Lucy: The Stolen Lives of Elephants'', she argued that captivity causes elephants physical and psychological harm and called for an independent reassessment of Lucy's fitness to travel to a sanctuary. During the interview, CBC also reported the Edmonton Valley Zoo's position that Lucy's respiratory condition and arthritis made transporting her dangerous.

=== Background ===
In interviews Levitt admitted she used to take her family to zoos, they went elephant riding and swimming with dolphins too. She became more educated about the realities of zoos through her documentary work. After completing the 2016 film, Sled Dogs, Levitt stated she would never make another documentary about animals, however Levitt explained she became passionate about Lucy's story when she received a message with a picture attached. In the picture was Lucy, an Asian elephant. She had been at the zoo since she was two years old, brought from Sri Lanka, where she was born, and placed into Edmonton Valley Zoo. "I saw a picture of her in this concrete enclosure, with these painted palm trees on it., And I looked at her and I thought, what is she doing here? And why is she alone?”

Lucy, in Edmonton is the zoo's main attraction, and her name and story has been circulating in the media for over a decade. Peta, LEAP, and Zoocheck are among the organizations on record organizing protests for Lucy's health concerns and a move to a natural habitat. In Zoocheck's 2009 report on Lucy, the number one argument from the zoo to move Lucy to a new habitat is "Lucy is the Zoo’s icon. Without their flagship animal, they would “lose their cause célèbre for fundraising”, and attendance would drop." There is a lot of controversy surrounding Lucy's health and the Edmonton Valley Zoo's wish to keep her. In the film, viewers are exposed to births in captivity and the reactions of new mothers as their babies are taken away, methods used to train elephants, and independent health assessments for Lucy.

=== List of Documentaries ===
- Contact (1979) about controversial therapy being used on autistic children (In-Motion Productions)
- Michael, a Gay Son (1980) about a son's difficulty in coming out to his parents (Bruce Glawson Production)
- Each of Us Has a Name (1999) follows the journey of Canadian Jewish teenagers and Holocaust survivors on the March of the Living as they visit former Nazi German death camps in Poland, as well as other historic sites in the country. Produced for the Global Television Network.
- Captain of Souls (1999) tells the story of Rev. William Andrew White, minister at the Second Baptist Church of New Glasgow, N.S. and radio broadcaster; he was the son of former slaves. He served as pastor to the all-black 2nd Construction Battalion of Nova Scotia during the First World War. Produced for History Channel.
- The Little Rock Nine (2001) the story of a group of African American high-school students in the 1950s who challenged racial segregation in the public schools of Little Rock, Arkansas. Levitt said she "couldn’t believe the images of the Little Rock Nine she saw on the Public Broadcasting Service of mobs and the abuse the courageous students endured, all to stand up for their right to an education. I couldn’t believe this was America, a country known for democracy; those images really stayed in my mind and defined me." Produced for History Channel.
- Come out Fighting: The 761st (2002) Winner of The Chris Statuette at the Columbus Film Festival. (History Channel's Turning Points of History)
- Sakharov - Conscience of a Country (2003) (History Channel's Turning Points of History)
- Gorbachev's Revolution (2004) to mark the 20th anniversary of Perestroika, the documentary includes interviews with former President Mikhail Gorbachev, George Bush Sr. and Eduard Shevardnadze. The soundtrack includes The Habonim Youth Choir rendition of the Israeli peace song Lay Down Your Arms (History Channel's Turning Points of History)
- The Velvet Revolution (2005) (History Channel's Turning Points of History)
- My Opposition: The Diaries of Friedrich Kellner (2006) describes one man's opposition to Nazi Germany. The documentary was chosen as the Tikkun Olam screening for the Calgary Jewish Film Festival in 2007, and it was also screened at the Toronto Jewish Film Festival in 2008. As a result of the relevance of the story line, which depicts the historical diary as a weapon against intolerance, the documentary was chosen to commemorate the 70th anniversary of Kristallnacht in a screening at the Dag Hammarskjöld Library at the United Nations Headquarters in New York City.
- Living Through Dying (2008) follows three people in their mid-thirties who are facing a terminal illness. (Discovery Channel)
- 7 Days of Remembrance and Hope (2009) follows the journey of 60 Canadian university students on the March of Remembrance and Hope, as they visit the former Nazi German death camps in occupied Poland as well as other historic sites in the country. Co produced with Eli Rubenstein. (CBC)
- Paws for Autism (2012) follows two autistic children and their service dogs (Animal Planet)
- Sled Dogs (2016) explores the Iditarod and raises allegations of animal cruelty among the event's breeders, trainers and kennelers.
- Lucy: The Stolen Lives of Elephants (TBR 2025) CCI Entertainment (2025)

== Awards and nominations ==
Fern Levitt's awards and nominations
1999	Each of Us Has a Name	Best Documentary, Chicago International Film Festival	Won
2002	Come out Fighting: The 761st	Chris Statuette, Columbus Film Festival	Won
2003	Sakharov - Conscience of a Country	Best Historical Documentary, Houston Film Festival	Won
2004	Gorbachev's Revolution	One World	Won
2006	The Velvet Revolution	21st Gemini Awards for Best Biography	Nominated
2009	7 Days of Remembrance and Hope	Best Documentary, Chicago International Film Festival	Won
2016	Sled Dogs	Best Editing in a Documentary, Canadian Screen Award	Nominated
2016	Sled Dogs	Female Director, Documentary category, Alliance of Women Film Journalists EDA Award	Nominated
2016	Sled Dogs	World Documentary Award, Whistler Film Festival Documentary Award	Won

== Other ==
Levitt is a trained social worker. She moved into making television in 1990, her first job was as a researcher for TVOntario. She was an instructor at the Toronto Film School.

== Notable Mentions ==
In 2001, about Levitt's documentary "Little Rock Nine", prior to it being aired on Turning Points of History, John Doyle (The Globe and Mail) wrote "Not many Canadian documentary filmmakers get an interview with Bill Clinton but Fern Levitt got him and he's got a lot to say in The Little Rock Nine, a good documentary about the bitter desegregation of an Arkansas school in 1957. That's when nine students attempted to attend an all-white school in Little Rock, a right they were guaranteed by the courts. The Governor of Arkansas sent the National Guard to stop them and President Eisenhower sent the army to protect them. Footage from those days is still shocking, revealing as it does a level of racism, bigotry and hatred that is unfathomable."

In 2017, Helen T. Verongos (New York Times) wrote, "It’s easy to fall in love with the animals in “Sled Dogs.” It’s thornier to sift through the words of the handlers and mushers — many of whom seem to genuinely care for the dogs — and determine how pervasive abuse is in dog-sledding ventures."

== Controversy Over Song Choice for "Gorbachev's Revolution" ==
Barbara Kay, a political columnist from The National Post wrote an article about a feature song chosen by Levitt for the soundtrack of "Gorbachev's Revolution" (released in 2004). Kay explains that during the editing for the documentary, Levitt put together a sequence showing the Berlin Wall coming down, and wanted to hear children singing a "sweet peace song" during this historical moment. Levitt had contacted a choir director for Toronto's well-known Claude Watson School of the Performing Arts, who tentatively agreed for the choir sing in the film. and the two discussed songs, one of them was "Lay Down Your Arms" (LDYA) by Israeli composer Doron Levinson.

The song "Lay Down Your Arms" was composed by Doron Levinson as a tribute to fallen soldiers during the 1973 Yom Kippur War. The lyrics are inspired by a peaceful vision described by the prophet Isaiah, where weapons are transformed into tools for agriculture. Levitt settled on this song for the Berlin Wall scene, and informed the choir director, and soon received a message saying the choir would not perform LDYA stating it was because it was "written by an Israeli soldier."

Levitt met with the choir director, the school principal, representatives from the teachers' union, and the Canadian Jewish Congress. The Toronto District School Board's non-discrimination policy was recited and the school principal agreed that the composer's country of origin should not have been grounds for a refusal. The article states that the choir director's claim for refusing the song was that it was "not a high quality song."

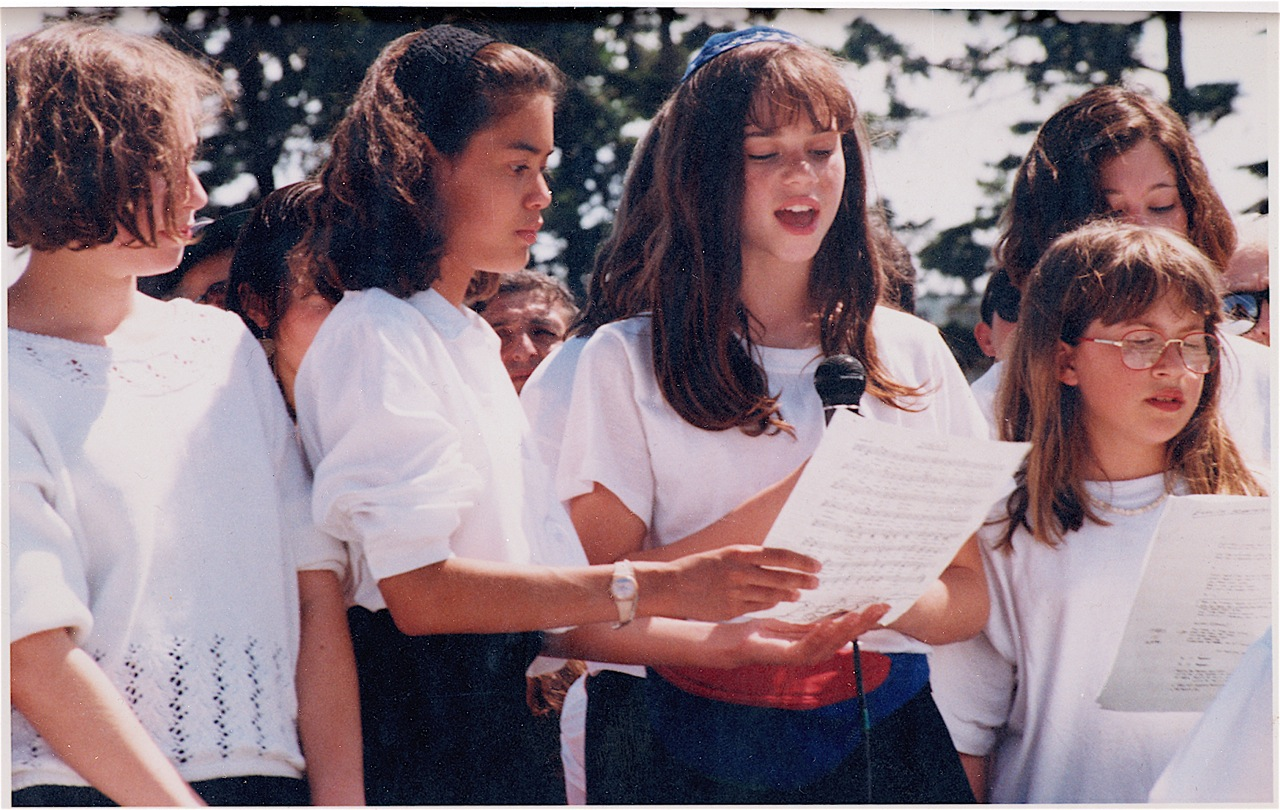
Congregation Habonim Toronto Youth Choir performed their rendition of "Lay Down Your Arms" for Fern Levitt's documentary, "Gorbachev's Revolution."

Levitt filed a complaint against the choir director with the Toronto District School Board. After an investigation, the Board cleared her of any wrongdoing, stating that there was no evidence to support Levitt's claim. However, the Board did not inoclude Khaskin's corroborating testimony in its investigation.

The song was used in Levitt's documentary and was performed by The Habonim Youth Choir from Congregation Habonim Toronto.
