= Altona, Manitoba =

Town in Manitoba, Canada

Altona
- Town
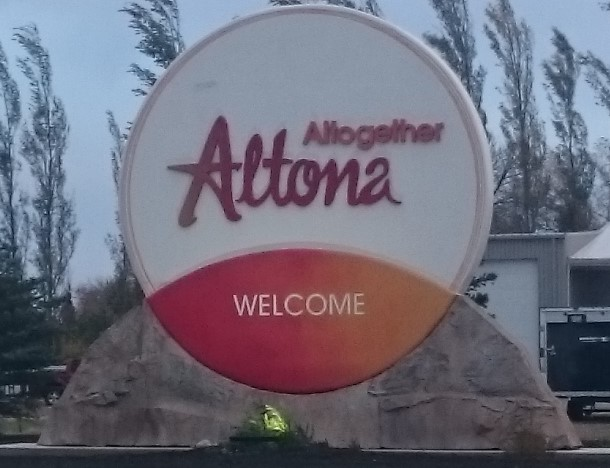
- Welcome sign in Altona

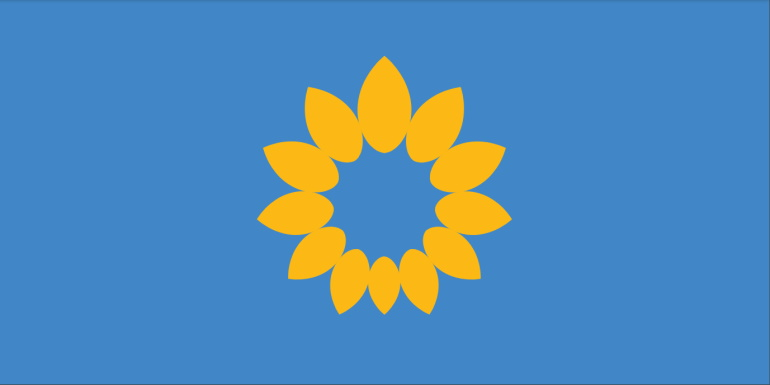
- Flag

- Town boundaries

- Location of Altona in Manitoba
- Coordinates: 49°06′16″N 97°33′45″W
- Country: Canada
- Province: Manitoba
- Region: Pembina Valley
- Established: 1880
- Incorporated: 1945 (village); 1956 (town)

Government
  - Mayor: Harv Schroeder
  - MLA (Borderland): Josh Guenter (PC)
  - MP (Portage—Lisgar): Branden Leslie

Area
  - Total: 9.46 km^{2} (3.65 sq mi)
- Elevation: 247 m (810 ft)

Population (2016 Census)
  - Total: 4,212
  - Density: 445.2/km^{2} (1,153/sq mi)
- Time zone: UTC-6 (CST)
  - Summer (DST): UTC-5 (CDT)
- Website: www.altona.ca

Altona is a town in southern Manitoba, Canada, about 100 km south-west of Winnipeg and 158 km north of Grand Forks, North Dakota. The population at the 2021 Census was 4,390 residents. Old Altona was founded in 1880 by Plautdietsch-speaking Mennonites from the Russian Empire. It is surrounded by the Municipality of Rhineland. Much of the surrounding area is devoted to farming and agriculture-based business.

== History ==
=== 1800s ===
Plautdietsch-speaking Mennonites from Russia began settling in Manitoba from 1874 through 1880 after signing a Privilegium with the Canadian government. The settlers initially were located in the Mennonite Reserve (largely now the Rural Municipality of Hanover). This area, east of the Red River and south of the Seine River, became known as the East Reserve when another block of land west of the Red River, known as the West Reserve was granted for Mennonite settlement in 1876, which included the land to become Altona. The first settlement at Altona was made in 1880, by Bergthal Mennonites from the East Reserve nearby. A southern spur of the Canadian Pacific Railway went through the Altona village area in 1882. A separate town-site, also named Altona, had its start in the 1895 when the Canadian Pacific Railroad was extended to that point, with the village area later known as Old Altona.

=== 1900s ===
While Altona had a population large enough to support incorporation by the late 1920s, it took until 1946 for the community to be incorporated as a village separate from the Rural Municipality of Rhineland. Its population at that time was 1065 residents. In 1956, population growth to 1698 residents prompted the village council to apply to the provincial government to change the status to town. This change became official on 24 October 1956.

The first Mennonite Central Committee self-help centre (now Gift and Thrift Store) in Canada was founded in Altona in 1972.

=== 2000s ===
By 2021, the town had grown to a population of more than 4000 people.

=== Incidents ===
On October 9, 1902, Altona became the site of one of Canada's first school shootings. 36-year-old Heinrich J. "Henry" Toews (May 6, 1866-January 19, 1903), a teacher, opened fire on students & trustees with a revolver at a Mennonite school, killing one student and wounding five others (two students & 3 trustees). Soon after he was confronted by villagers, but he kept them at bay with his gun. Soon after, he shot himself; The shot did not kill him, and he would regain consciousness six days later at the hospital, where he would remain until January 19, 1903 when he succumbed to his injuries.

On November 17, 1990, Altona was the site of the Altona murder, which garnered widespread media attention.

== Demographics ==
In the 2021 Census of Population conducted by Statistics Canada, Altona had a population of 4,390 living in 1,700 of its 1,760 total private dwellings, a change of 1.3% from its 2016 population of 4,212. With a land area of 9.35 km^{2} (3.61 sq mi), it had a population density of 456.4/km^{2} (1,182.0/sq mi) in 2021.

== Economy ==
Altona was the site of the Rhineland Consumers Co-operative (founded 1931 ), the Altona Co-op Service (founded 1937), the Altona Credit Union (founded 1939) and Co-op Vegetable Oils (CVO) (founded 1943). These co-operative enterprises were a highly effective local response to the devastating impact of the Great Depression on local farmers' incomes. Jake (J.J.) Siemens played an important role in their development, and the growth of the co-operative movement in southern Manitoba.

Bunge Limited now operates the oil-seed crushing plant in Altona, after buying the assets from Canamera Foods.

Altona is also home to Friesens Corporation, which started off as a small confectionery store opened by David W. Friesen in 1907 and now employs hundreds of people. It is the primary printer of yearbooks in North America, as well as printing in commercial consumer books, specializing in full colour art and educational books. The town is also the headquarters for Golden West Broadcasting.

Altona's Mennonite Central Committee self-help centre (now Gift and Thrift Store) was founded in 1972. Staffed by volunteers, MCC Thrift stores now contribute about $4M annually to MCC projects. The store has been expanded numerous times, and is still completely volunteer-run. The proceeds raised all go to MCC charitable projects.

== Government and politics ==
Altona is governed by a mayor and six councillors who are elected by residents. The current mayor of Altona is Harv Schroeder. The current town councillors are Craig Smiley, Jordan Siemens (deputy mayor), Cheryl Dueck, Donna Rosling-Wolters, Tammy Braun, and Perry Batchelor.

Altona is represented in the Legislative Assembly of Manitoba (as part of the Borderland electoral district) by Progressive Conservative MLA, Josh Guenter, and in the House of Commons of Canada (as part of the Portage—Lisgar riding) by Conservative MP, Branden Leslie.

== Arts and culture ==
Altona, Manitoba is known as "The Sunflower Capital of Canada", and is host to the annual Sunflower Festival, which began in 1965. The Sunflower Festival has a Sunflower festival pageant where they crown a queen every year, who wins a trip to Australia. The festival also includes a small midway, quilt show, baseball tournament, stage show, and street dance to name a few. In 2008, the Town of Altona opened an Art Gallery and Sculpture Garden, displaying many different styles of artwork.

Altona's sister city is Emerald, Queensland, Australia. Every year a Sunflower Festival is held in which a young woman in the community is crowned the Sunflower Queen and gets a flight to Emerald for free to participate in the Sunflower Festival held there.

== Attractions ==
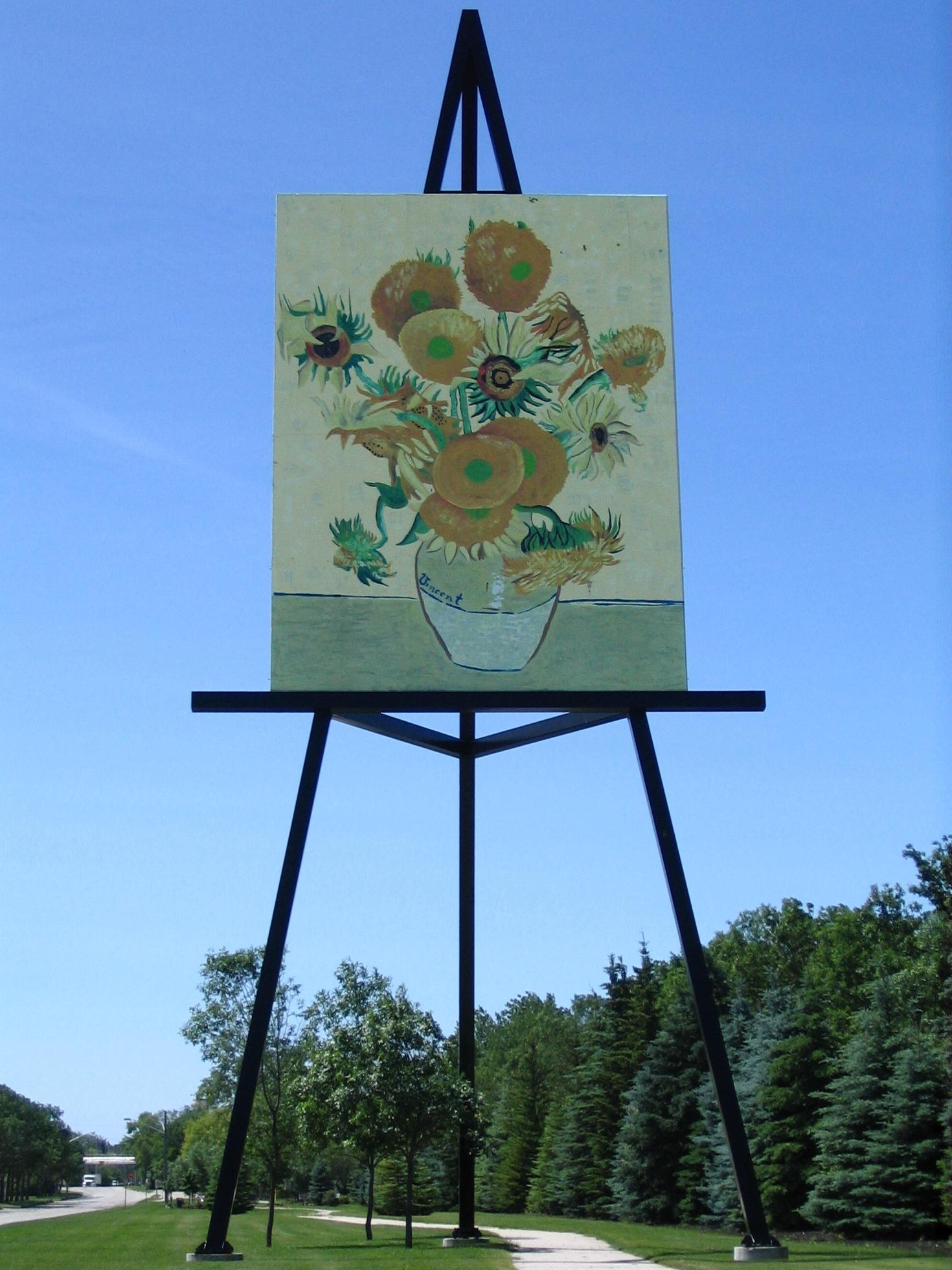
The giant replica of Sunflowers by Vincent van Gogh

The community is home to the largest replica of a famous painting by Vincent van Gogh. It was named 'The largest painting on an easel by The Guinness Book of World Records in 1998. It was the first of three works in the Big Easel Project by local artist Cameron Cross, based on the painting Sunflowers. The base (easel) stands at 76'6" and the canvas was made by laminating together 24 sheets of 3/4" plywood and splattering it with 17 gallons of paint to create the picture. Altona is also home to the Gallery in the Park, a heritage home turned fine art gallery and outdoor sculpture garden.

The Trans Canada Trail goes through Altona, heading south to Gretna and west to Rosengart through Buffalo Creek Nature Park.

== Infrastructure ==
Altona Municipal Airport is about 2.8 km southeast of the town.

Manitoba Highway 30 is the main north–south route. It begins in Gretna, and passes on the east border of Altona to Rosenfeld. Manitoba Provincial Road 201 is the main east–west route.

In the late 1990s the town, in partnership with various businesses and volunteers, embarked on an ambitious plan to improve recreation facilities. In 2000, the Altona Aquatic Centre opened to rave reviews, a trails system was started, and in 2003 the Millennium Exhibition Centre opened. This 75,000 square-foot facility features an ice arena, curling arena, banquet hall, meeting rooms, running track, concessions, kitchens and community spaces. Since then, other recreation facilities have been added such as a triples tennis court, a large playground, and most recently in 2013 a $250,000 skate park, and a second full size baseball diamond set to open in 2014 – to be known as Access Field.

== Education ==
Altona is located in, and home to the head office of, the Border Land School District. W.C. Miller Collegiate is the high school in the town.

Other schools within Altona are École Elmwood School (grades K-3), École West Park School (grades 4–6), and École Parkside School (grades 7–8).

== Media ==
The town was serviced by the Red River Valley Echo newspaper, owned by Postmedia Network. It ceased operation mid 2020. The town is now served by the Altona Rhineland Voice, which commenced operation in March 2022.

The town is served by the AM radio station CFAM; it is owned by Golden West Broadcasting, whose CEO Elmer Hildebrand is an Altona native. The company's head office is also located in the town.

== Geography ==
=== Climate ===
Climate data for Altona (1981-2010)
Month	Jan	Feb	Mar	Apr	May	Jun	Jul	Aug	Sep	Oct	Nov	Dec	Year
Record high °C (°F)	6.7 (44.1)	14 (57)	22.2 (72.0)	35.6 (96.1)	36.7 (98.1)	38 (100)	38.9 (102.0)	40 (104)	39 (102)	33.5 (92.3)	25 (77)	14.4 (57.9)	40 (104)
Mean daily maximum °C (°F)	−10.1 (13.8)	−6.8 (19.8)	−0.1 (31.8)	11.1 (52.0)	19.2 (66.6)	23.7 (74.7)	26.3 (79.3)	26.0 (78.8)	19.8 (67.6)	11.0 (51.8)	0.1 (32.2)	−7.6 (18.3)	9.4 (48.9)
Daily mean °C (°F)	−15.0 (5.0)	−11.8 (10.8)	−4.8 (23.4)	5.1 (41.2)	12.6 (54.7)	17.9 (64.2)	20.3 (68.5)	19.5 (67.1)	13.5 (56.3)	5.6 (42.1)	−4.1 (24.6)	−11.9 (10.6)	3.9 (39.0)
Mean daily minimum °C (°F)	−19.9 (−3.8)	−16.8 (1.8)	−9.4 (15.1)	−0.9 (30.4)	5.9 (42.6)	12.0 (53.6)	14.3 (57.7)	12.9 (55.2)	7.2 (45.0)	0.2 (32.4)	−8.1 (17.4)	−16.1 (3.0)	−1.6 (29.1)
Record low °C (°F)	−40 (−40)	−40.6 (−41.1)	−33.5 (−28.3)	−23.9 (−11.0)	−13.9 (7.0)	−2.8 (27.0)	2.8 (37.0)	0 (32)	−6.7 (19.9)	−30 (−22)	−35 (−31)	−37.2 (−35.0)	−40.6 (−41.1)
Average precipitation mm (inches)	28.4 (1.12)	20.6 (0.81)	29.6 (1.17)	27.8 (1.09)	70.6 (2.78)	101.5 (4.00)	75.0 (2.95)	67.9 (2.67)	45.0 (1.77)	40.2 (1.58)	29.4 (1.16)	29.7 (1.17)	565.8 (22.28)
Source: Environment Canada

== Notable people ==
- Lois Braun, writer
- Peter Engbrecht, soldier
- Curwin Friesen, businessman
- Johann Funk, bishop
- Paul Hiebert, writer
- Elmer Hildebrand, broadcaster
- Harold Neufeld, politician
- Grace Nickel, artist
- Jack Penner, politician
- A. James Reimer, theologian
- Vic Schroeder, politician
- Jake Siemens, politician
- Armin Wiebe, writer
- Cornelius Wiebe, physician and politician
- Mackenzie Zacharias and Emily Zacharias, 2020 World Junior Curling Champions
