= Ernest Quost =

French painter

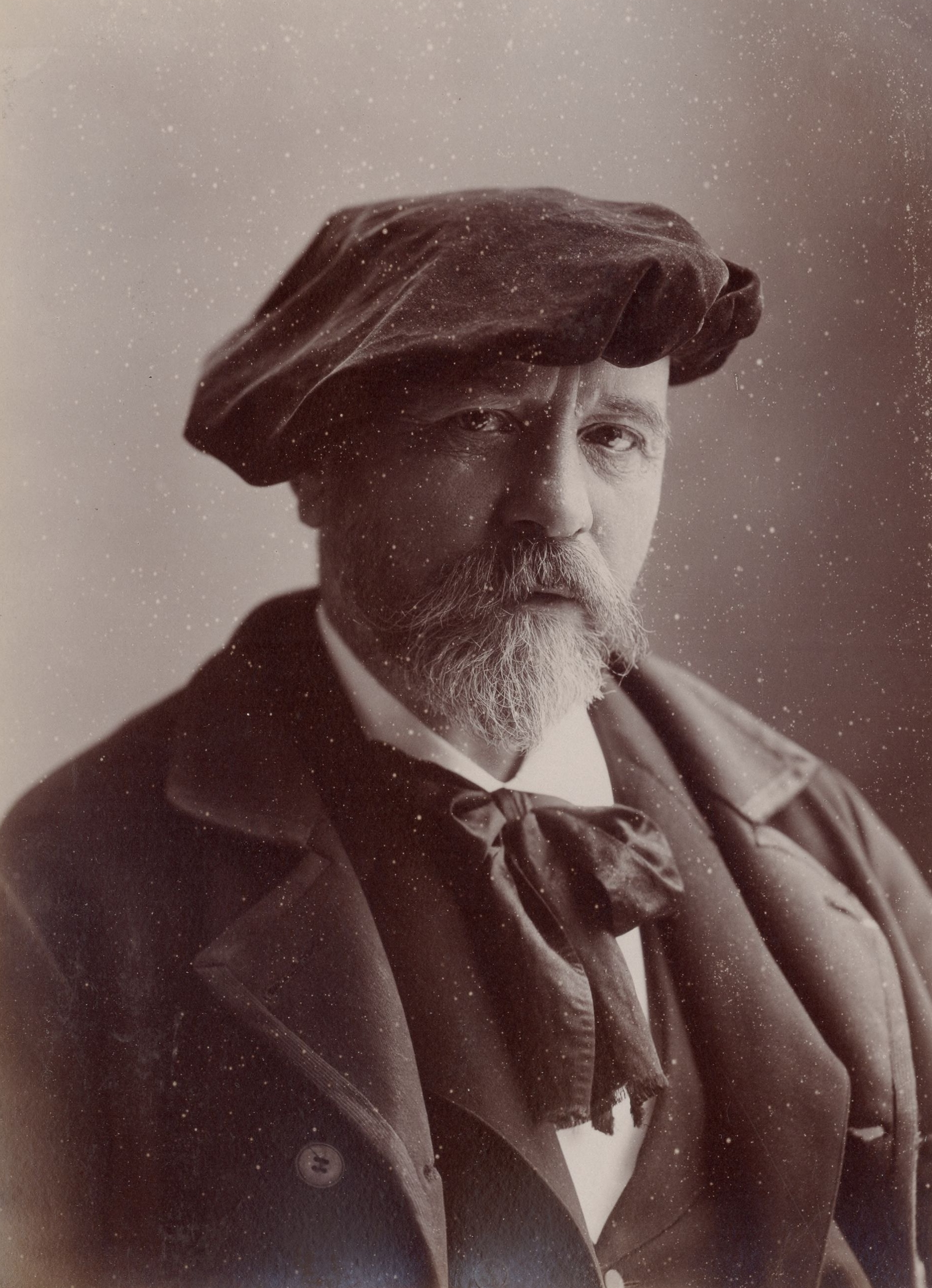
Ernest Quost

Ernest Quost (February 24, 1842 – March 24, 1931) was a French Impressionist painter of animated cityscapes, landscapes, still lifes, flowers, fruit and pastels.

== Biography ==
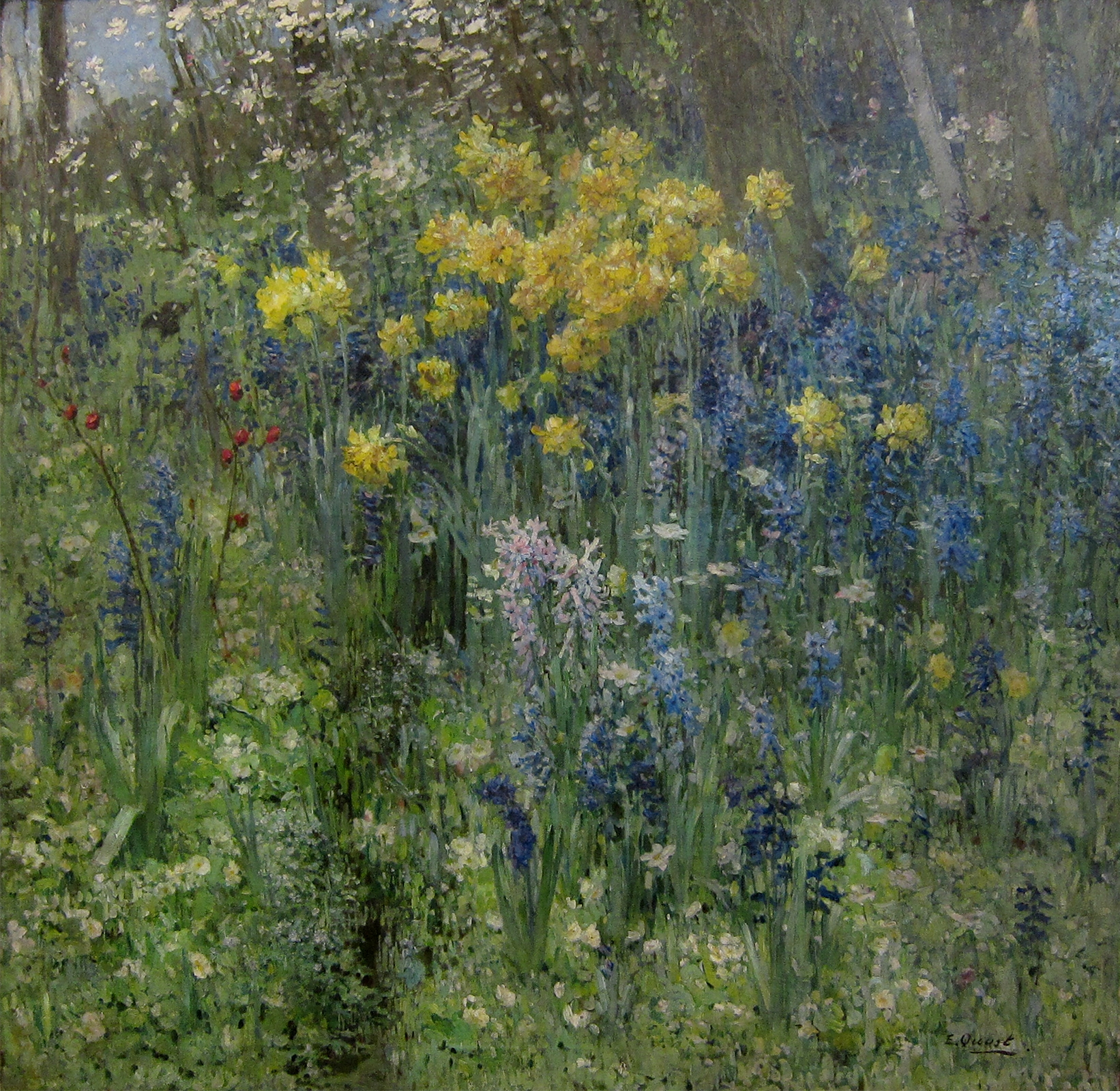
Fleurs de Pacques (1890), Musée d'Art et d'Industrie de Roubaix

He was born in Avallon (Yonne). He was probably a pupil of Horace Aumont (1839–1864) during his stay in Paris. He began at the Paris Salon in 1866 and continued to exhibit at the Salon des Artistes Francais, earning medals in 1880 and 1882, becoming an associate in 1887, and receiving a silver medal at the Exposition Universelle (1889). He was knighted in the Legion of Honour in 1883, and promoted to officer in 1903.

Quost is a "painter of Paris", the bustling boulevards, and dances. He first made many sketches, then painted in the workshop where he was a student of Pierre Eugène Montézin. Claude Monet appreciated flowers by Quost, and Van Gogh wrote in a letter to his brother Theo, "the hollyhocks belong to Quost".

Quost died in Paris in 1931.
