= Sled Dogs (film) =

- Directed by: Fern Levitt
- Produced by: Fern Levitt; Arnie Zipursky
- Edited by: Frank Cassano
- Production company: CCI Entertainment
- Distributed by: Search Engine Films
- Release date: December 3, 2016 (Whistler)
- Running time: 82 minutes
- Country: Canada
- Language: English

Sled Dogs is a Canadian documentary film, directed by Fern Levitt and released in 2016. The film explores the Iditarod, raising allegations of animal cruelty among breeders, trainers and kennelers of the event's sled dogs.

== Criticism ==
At least one dog keeper tried to obtain a legal injunction against the film's premiere at the Whistler Film Festival, alleging that Levitt had misrepresented footage of an unethical commercial pet breeder as being from a sled dog breeder. Keepers also defended practices such as chaining dogs and shooting injured dogs. A sled dog operator also filed a similar complaint with the Canadian Broadcasting Corporation after the film was broadcast on Documentary Channel in 2017, resulting in a report by CBC ombudsman Esther Enkin.

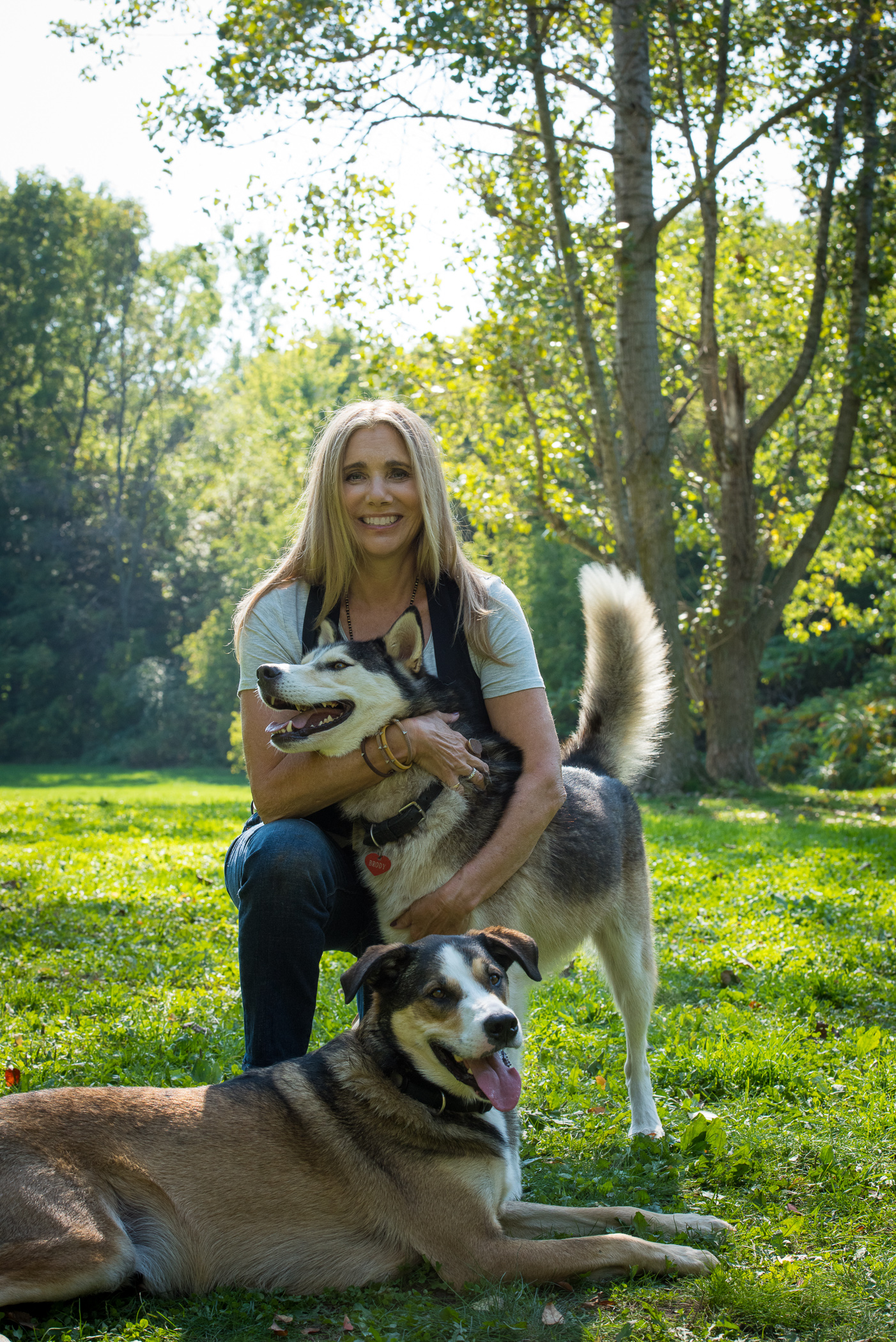
Fern Levitt, producer/director of Sled Dogs with dogs, Brody (Husky) and Odin (Collie-Shepherd mix). Photo: Jackie Brown

== Awards and nominations ==
The film received a Canadian Screen Award nominations at the 6th Canadian Screen Awards, for Best Editing in a Documentary (Frank Cassano), Documentary category, Alliance of Women Film Journalists, and won the World Documentary Award at the Whistler Film Festival.
