= Friesens =

Canadian publisher

Friesens Corporation

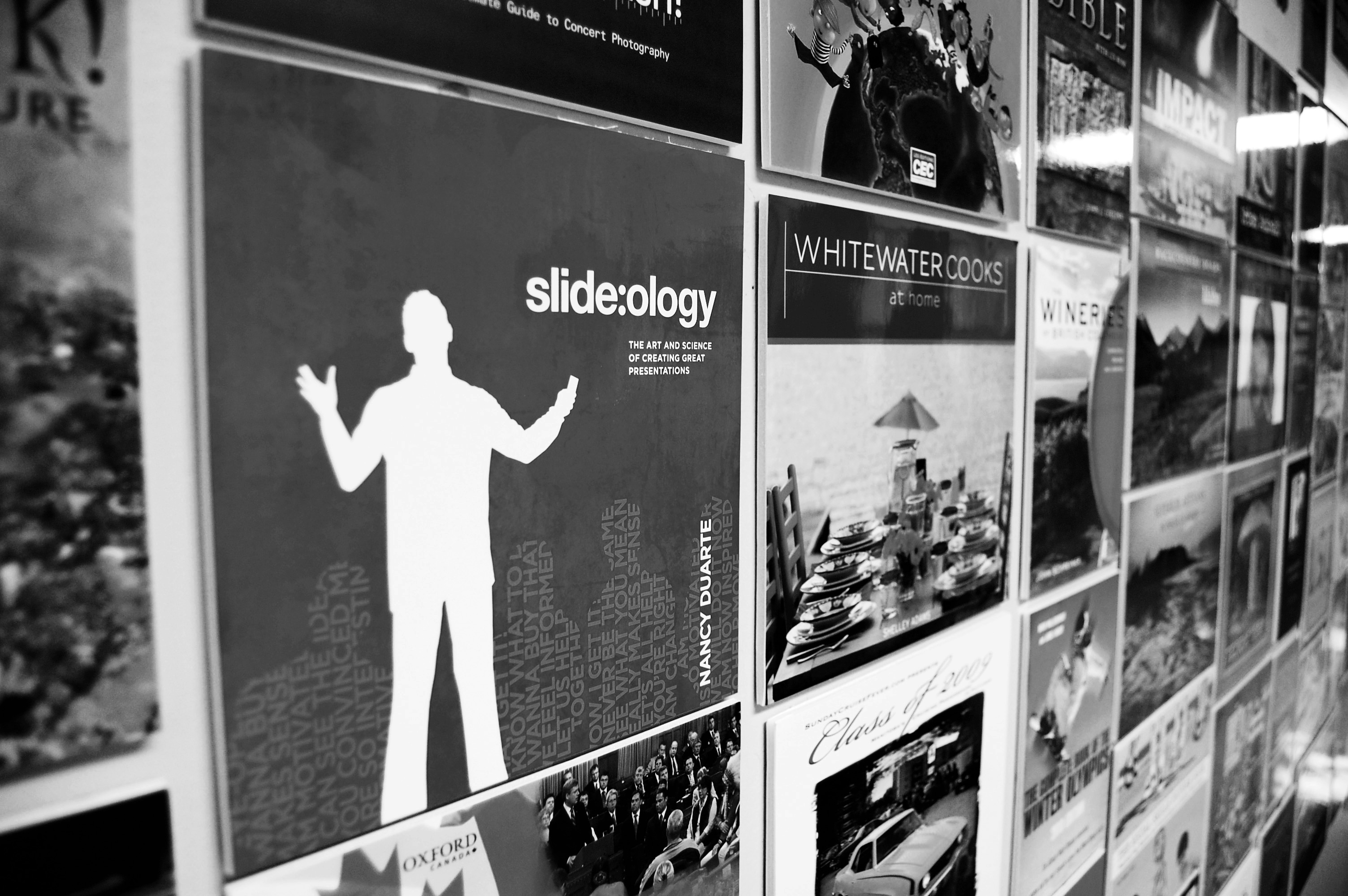
- Wall display of works published by Friesens at the company's headquarters
- Company type: Private (employee-owned)
- Industry: Printing
- Founded: 1907
- Founder: David W. Friesen
- Headquarters: Altona, Manitoba, Canada
- Area served: North America
- Key people: Chad Friesen, Chief Executive Officer; Byron Loeppky, President; Curwin Friesen, Chairman of the Board
- Products: Books, Yearbooks, Self-publishing
- Revenue: CAD$96,000,000 (2019) ▲10% from 2018
- Number of employees: 600
- Divisions: Friesens Book Division, Friesens Yearbooks, FriesenPress
- Website: www.friesens.com

Friesens Corporation is Canada's largest printer of hardcover books. They are employee-owned, specializing in hardcover books and yearbooks, and located in Altona, Manitoba, Canada. Friesens also operates a self-publishing subsidiary named FriesenPress, launched in 2009.

== History ==
- Friesens was founded by David W. Friesen in 1907 as a confectionery store.
- In 1933, the family purchased a printing press
- In 1941 launched weekly Altona Echo newspaper later amalgamating with the Morris Herald into the Red River Valley Echo.
- In 1950 incorporated as D.W. Friesen & Sons Inc,.
- In 1959 built new 16,500 sq. ft. plant. Purchased first offset press
- In 1960 began employee profit sharing and post secondary scholarships for employees' children
- In 1965 started selling school yearbooks in Manitoba and Saskatchewan
- In 1970 launched Business Machines division
- In 1971 purchased ACME Box Company. Expanded main plant by 12,000 sq ft.
- In 1973 expanded school yearbook force
- In 1976 D.W. Friesen & Sons changes to Friesens
- In 1978 printed first four-colour book
- In 1987 purchased four colour presses
- In 1990 started Graphic Arts course at Red River Community College
- In 1999 Friesens Fast Print and Packaging Division relocated. Started selling school graduation supplies.
- In 2000, Friesens printed the Canadian run of Harry Potter and the Goblet of Fire, producing 400,000 copies of the book.
- In 2002 printed Harry Potter and the Philosopher's Stone by J. K. Rowling
- In 2004 Friesens landmark printing of Harry Potter and the Order of the Phoenix on 100% post consumer waste led author J.K. Rowling to insist all future Harry Potter books worldwide be printed "tree-free"
- In 2008 built North America's most advanced and eco-friendly 130,000 sq. ft. book manufacturing plant.
- In 2009 Friesens purchased think4D a revolutionary and patented three-dimensional book cover and packaging technology; Friesens launches FriesenPress for self-publishing authors;
- In 2010 Friesens designed and printed American Idol: Back Story and Season 9 Highlights; Designed and printed school yearbooks appearing on the television series, Glee
- In 2015 Friesens install an 8-colour, format 8, R900 HiPrint XXL perfecting press from Manroland that provides for an imposition of up to 64 pages, printed both sides, in one pass. Successfully completed a shift in the employee-ownership model.
- In 2016 printed Harry Potter and the Cursed Child
- In 2017 celebrated 110 years in business with a corporate and community celebration

== Current operations ==
Friesens is Canada's largest printer of hardcover books. Furthermore, it has been rated as one of Canada's best 50 managed companies by Deloitte and Touche on several occasions. In 2018, Friesens was number 60 of the top 400 printing companies in the United States and Canada.

== FriesenPress ==
On July 13, 2009, Friesens Corporation launched a self-publishing subsidiary called FriesenPress.

FriesenPress offers editing, design, distribution, and promotional support services to assist authors with self-publishing their books. Its team of over 55 employees and 100 freelancers have partnered with thousands of authors on self-publishing over 10,000 book titles. It is the largest company of its kind in Canada.

In March 2021, the company shifted its headquarters to Altona, Manitoba and became a fully remote organization.

== Awards ==
- In 2004, The National Association for Printing Leadership awarded Friesens its highest management award.
- In 2004, Caldwell Partners and The Globe and Mail named president Curwin Friesen as one of Canada's "Top 40 Under 40".
